= List of New York Sirens draft picks =

The New York Sirens are a professional ice hockey team in the Professional Women's Hockey League (PWHL). Their first draft pick was Ella Shelton, selected fourth overall in the 2023 PWHL draft. The Sirens have participated in four PWHL Drafts and have drafted 38 players. They have selected first overall twice, taking Sarah Fillier in the 2024 PWHL Draft, and Kristýna Kaltounková in the 2025 PWHL Draft.

== Key ==
General terms and abbreviations
Term or abbreviation	Definition
Draft	The year that the player was selected
Round	The round of the draft in which the player was selected
Pick	The overall position in the draft at which the player was selected
Pos	Position of the player

Position abbreviations
Abbreviation	Definition
G	Goaltender
D	Defense
LW	Left wing
C	Center
RW	Right wing
F	Forward

== Draft picks ==
Full list of New York Sirens draft picks
Draft	Round	Pick	Player	Nationality	Pos	School/club team	Conference/league
2023	1	4	Ella Shelton	Canada	D	Team Scotiabank	PWHPA
2023	2	9	Jaime Bourbonnais	Canada	D	Team Scotiabank	PWHPA
2023	3	16	Jessie Eldridge	Canada	F	Team Harvey's	PWHPA
2023	4	21	Chloé Aurard	France	F	Northeastern University	Hockey East
2023	5	28	Élizabeth Giguère	Canada	RW	Boston Pride	PHF
2023	6	33	Corinne Schroeder	Canada	G	Montreal Force	PHF
2023	7	40	Jill Saulnier	Canada	F	Team Adidas	PWHPA
2023	8	45	Brooke Hobson	Canada	D	Modo Hockey	SDHL
2023	9	52	Jade Downie-Landry	Canada	F	Montreal Force	PHF
2023	10	57	Paetyn Levis	United States	F	Ohio State University	WCHA
2023	11	64	Abbey Levy	United States	G	Boston College	Hockey East
2023	12	69	Olivia Zafuto	United States	D	Boston Pride	PHF
2023	13	76	Kayla Vespa	Canada	F	Team Adidas	PWHPA
2023	14	81	Emma Woods	Canada	F	Toronto Six	PHF
2023	15	88	Alexandra Labelle	Canada	F	Montreal Force	PHF
2024	1	1	Sarah Fillier	United States	F	Princeton University	Hockey East
2024	2	10	Maja Nylén Persson	Sweden	D	Brynäs IF	SDHL
2024	3	13	Noora Tulus	Finland	F	Luleå HF	SDHL
2024	3	16	Allyson Simpson	United States	D	Colgate University	ECAC
2024	4	19	Gabby Rosenthal	United States	F	Ohio State University	WCHA
2024	5	25	Elle Hartje	United States	C	Yale University	Hockey East
2024	5	28	Kayle Osborne	Canada	G	Colgate University	ECAC
2024	6	31	Emmy Fecteau	Canada	C	Concordia University	RSEQ
2025	1	1	Kristýna Kaltounková	Czech Republic	F	Colgate University	ECAC
2025	1	3	Casey O'Brien	United States	F	University of Wisconsin	WCHA
2025	2	9	Anne Cherkowski	Canada	F	Clarkson University	ECAC
2025	3	17	Makenna Webster	United States	F	Ohio State University	WCHA
2025	4	25	Dayle Ross	Canada	D	St. Cloud State University	WCHA
2025	4	27	Maddi Wheeler	Canada	F	Ohio State University	WCHA
2025	4	28	Callie Shanahan	United States	G	Boston University	Hockey East
2025	5	33	Anna Bargman	United States	F	Yale University	ECAC
2025	6	41	Kaley Doyle	United States	G	Quinnipiac University	ECAC
2026	1	7	Emma Peschel	United States	D	Ohio State University	WCHA
2026	2	19	Elisa Holopainen	Finland	F	Frölunda HC	SDHL
2026	3	31	Carina DiAntonio	Canada	F	Yale University	ECAC
2026	4	43	Katelyn Roberts	Canada	F	Penn State University	AHA
2026	5	55	Grace Wolfe	United States	D	St. Cloud State University	WCHA
2026	6	67	Naomi Boucher	Canada	F	Yale University	ECAC
