= List of New York Sirens players =

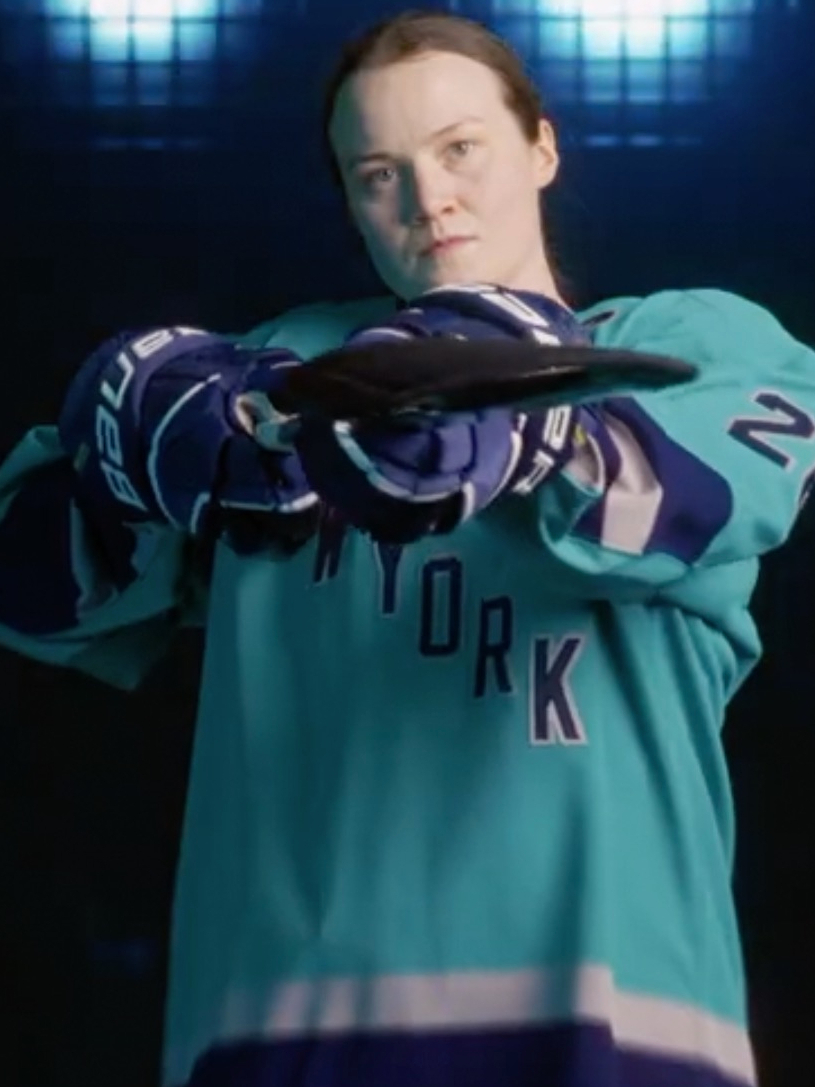
Micah Zandee-Hart, the first captain in franchise history.

The New York Sirens are a professional women's ice hockey team based in the New York metropolitan area and members of the Professional Women's Hockey League (PWHL). Founded on August 29, 2023, the Sirens are one of the league's six charter franchises. The team plays its home games at the Prudential Center in Newark, New Jersey, sharing the venue with the NHL's New Jersey Devils. New York was one of the PWHL's original markets and has played a prominent role in the league's growth, benefiting from the region's long history of women's hockey and its status as one of North America's largest media markets.

The franchise competed under the temporary name "PWHL New York" during the league's inaugural season before unveiling its permanent identity as the New York Sirens on September 9, 2024. The name references the city's energy, ambition, and ability to draw people together, while also evoking the sound of emergency sirens that are synonymous with New York's fast-paced urban environment. The team's primary colors are Torch Red, Deep Navy, and Sky Blue, and its crest features a stylized "NY" monogram integrated into a siren-inspired design.

New York assembled its inaugural roster through the PWHL's founding player signings and inaugural draft, building around a core that included United States national team stars Alex Carpenter and Abby Roque, Canadian defender Ella Shelton, and veteran goaltender Corinne Schroeder. Over the club's first three seasons, additional national-team players such as Jessie Eldridge, Micah Zandee-Hart, and Sarah Fillier also joined the roster.

On January 1, 2024, the Sirens hosted Toronto in the first game in PWHL history at a sold-out Mattamy Athletic Centre in Toronto. New York defeated Toronto 4–0, with Carpenter scoring the league's first goal and Schroeder recording the first shutout in PWHL history.

As of the conclusion of the 2025–26 season, 49 players have appeared in at least one game for the franchise; of them, 5 are goaltenders, while 44 are skaters.

== Key ==
Key of colors and symbols
#	Number worn for majority of tenure with the Sirens
WC	Walter Cup Champion
*	Current member of the Sirens organization (including reserves)
†	Walter Cup champion, retired jersey, or elected to the Hockey Hall of Fame

Skaters
Pos	Position
D	Defender
F	Forward

The seasons column lists the first year of the season of the player's first game and the last year of the season of the player's last game. For example, a player who played one game in the 2023–24 season would be listed as playing with the team from 2023–24, regardless of what calendar year the game occurred within.

Statistics are complete to the end of the 2025–26 PWHL season.

== Goaltenders ==
Note: GP = Games played; Min, TOI = Minutes played; W = Wins; L = Losses; OTL = Overtime losses; GA = Goals-against; GAA = Goals-against average; SO = Shutouts; SV% = Save percentage;

Name	#	Nationality	Seasons	Regular season							Playoffs						Notes
Name	#	Nationality	Seasons	GP	W	L	OTL	SO	GAA	SV%	GP	W	L	SO	GAA	SV%	Notes
Levy, Abbey	39	United States	2023–2025	10	1	6	2	0	3.19	.899	0	0	0	0	0.00	.000	
Osborne, Kayle	82	Canada	2024–2026	37	13	18	5	5	2.40	.909	0	0	0	0	0.00	.000	
Post, Lindsey	33	Canada	2023–2024	2	1	0	0	0	1.61	.946	0	0	0	0	0.00	.000	
Schroeder, Corinne	30	Canada	2023–2025	35	17	15	3	5	2.41	.924	0	0	0	0	0.00	.000	
Shanahan, Callie*	37	United States	2025–present	4	1	1	1	0	3.02	.871	0	0	0	0	0.00	.000	

== Skaters ==
Note: GP = Games played; G = Goals; A = Assists; Pts = Points; PIM = Penalty minutes;

Name	#	Nationality	Pos	Seasons	Regular season					Playoffs					Notes
Name	#	Nationality	Pos	Seasons	GP	G	A	Pts	PIM	GP	G	A	Pts	PIM	Notes
Aurard-Bushee, Chloé	12	France	F	2023–2025	48	3	9	12	4	0	0	0	0	0	
Baker, Taylor	4	Canada	D	2023–2025	25	0	0	0	6	0	0	0	0	0	
Bargman, Anna*	22	United States	F	2025–present	29	4	2	6	6	0	0	0	0	0	
Bernard, Lauren*	16	United States	D	2024–present	38	0	4	4	2	0	0	0	0	0	
Bourbonnais, Jaime*	14	Canada	D	2023–present	82	8	22	30	40	0	0	0	0	0	
Carpenter, Alex	25	United States	F	2023–2025	50	19	24	43	0	0	0	0	0	0	
Cherkowski, Anne	24	Canada	F	2025–2026	28	2	7	9	2	0	0	0	0	0	
DeGeorge, Clair*	41	United States	F	2025–present	9	0	2	2	2	0	0	0	0	0	
Downie-Landry, Jade	27	Canada	F	2023–2025	54	12	7	19	51	0	0	0	0	0	
Eldridge, Jessie	9	Canada	F	2023–2025	54	16	22	38	28	0	0	0	0	0	
Fällman, Johanna	59	Sweden	D	2023–2024	21	0	0	0	2	0	0	0	0	0	
Fecteau, Emmy*	29	Canada	F	2024–present	58	1	1	2	33	0	0	0	0	0	Intact Impact Award 2025
Fillier, Sarah*	10	Canada	F	2024–present	59	22	30	52	49	0	0	0	0	0	PWHL Rookie of the Year 2025; PWHL Points Leader Award (Tied) 2025
Giguère, Élizabeth	18	Canada	F	2023–2025	53	5	3	8	10	0	0	0	0	0	
Girard, Taylor	71	United States	F	2024–2026	35	8	3	11	44	0	0	0	0	0	
Gruschow, Alexa	16	United States	F	2023–2024	4	0	0	0	4	0	0	0	0	0	
Hartje, Elle*	13	United States	F	2024–present	56	0	13	13	12	0	0	0	0	0	
Hobson, Brooke	6	Canada	D	2023–2025	53	2	7	9	24	0	0	0	0	0	
Kaltounková, Kristýna*	98	Czech Republic	F	2025–present	21	11	1	12	45	0	0	0	0	0	
Juodikis, Kira*	55	Canada	F	2025–present	4	0	0	0	0	0	0	0	0	0	
Knowles, Olivia*	7	Canada	D	2024–present	15	0	0	0	0	0	0	0	0	0	
Křížová, Denisa*	44	Czech Republic	F	2025–present	7	1	1	2	4	0	0	0	0	0	
Labelle, Alexandra	13	Canada	F	2023–2024	24	1	2	3	4	0	0	0	0	0	
Levis, Paetyn*	19	United States	F	2023–present	83	9	12	21	24	0	0	0	0	0	
Norcross, Savannah*	7	United States	F	2023–2024; 2025–present	43	1	2	3	6	0	0	0	0	0	
Nylén Persson, Maja*	8	Sweden	D	2024–present	53	4	13	17	18	0	0	0	0	0	
O'Brien, Casey*	26	United States	F	2025–present	28	7	15	22	2	0	0	0	0	0	
O'Neill, Kristin	43	Canada	F	2025–2026	30	4	1	5	14	0	0	0	0	0	
Olivier, Carley	74	Canada	D	2023–2024	1	0	0	0	0	0	0	0	0	0	
Packer, Madison	23	United States	F	2023–2024	23	0	1	1	4	0	0	0	0	0	
Roese, Jincy	71	United States	D	2025–2026	22	0	6	6	4	0	0	0	0	0	
Roque, Abby	11	United States	F	2023–2025	54	12	18	30	37	0	0	0	0	0	
Rosenthal, Gabby	15	United States	F	2024–2025	29	1	3	4	8	0	0	0	0	0	
Ross, Dayle*	2	Canada	D	2025–present	16	0	0	0	0	0	0	0	0	0	
Saulnier, Jill	44	Canada	F	2023–2025	23	1	1	2	10	0	0	0	0	0	
Shelton, Ella	17	Canada	D	2023–2025	48	15	22	37	24	0	0	0	0	0	
Simpson, Allyson	20	United States	D	2024–2026	60	4	6	10	28	0	0	0	0	0	
Tulus, Noora	40	Finland	F	2024–2025	30	1	1	2	6	0	0	0	0	0	
Vallario, Nicole*	11	Switzerland	D	2025–present	11	1	2	3	2	0	0	0	0	0	
Vespa, Kayla	81	Canada	F	2023–2026	63	2	3	5	10	0	0	0	0	0	
Wheeler, Maddi	18	Canada	F	2025–2026	29	3	7	10	24	0	0	0	0	0	
Woods, Emma	67	Canada	F	2023–2024	24	2	3	5	8	0	0	0	0	0	
Zafuto, Olivia	3	United States	D	2023–2024	13	0	1	1	4	0	0	0	0	0	
Zandee-Hart, Micah*	28	Canada	D	2023–present	78	2	15	17	76	0	0	0	0	0	Captain 2023–present
