= 2025–26 New York Sirens season =

Professional Women's Hockey League season

2025–26 New York Sirens
- League: 6th PWHL
- 2025–26 record: 9–3–3–15
- Home record: 7–2–2–4
- Road record: 2–1–1–11
- Goals for: 63
- Goals against: 83

Team information
- General manager: Pascal Daoust
- Coach: Greg Fargo
- Captain: Micah Zandee-Hart
- Alternate captains: Sarah Fillier; Jaime Bourbonnais
- Arena: Prudential Center
- Average attendance: 5,095

Team leaders
- Goals: Kristýna Kaltounková (11)
- Assists: Casey O'Brien (15)
- Points: Sarah Fillier (23)
- Penalty minutes: Micah Zandee-Hart (50)
- Plus/minus: Elle Hartje (+3)
- Wins: Kayle Osborne (11)
- Goals against average: Kayle Osborne (2.47)

The 2025–26 New York Sirens season is the team's third season as a member of the Professional Women's Hockey League. They play their home games at the Prudential Center in Newark, New Jersey.

== Offseason ==
=== Coaching changes ===
On August 5, 2025, the Sirens announced the hiring of Valérie Bois as an assistant coach. She previously served as head coach of the 2025 U Sports Women's Ice Hockey Championship winning Bishop's Gaiters. New York also announced the departure of assistant coaches Mike Sommer and Lauren Williams.

== Schedule and results ==
=== Preseason ===
The preseason schedule was published on October 8, 2025.

Pre-season camp

Date	Opponent	Score	OT	Decision	Location	Box Score/Recap
November 13	Minnesota	2–5		Doyle	Codey Arena	
November 14	Minnesota	6–2		Osborne	Codey Arena	

=== Standings ===
Pos	Team	Pld	W	OTW	OTL	L	GF	GA	GD	Pts	Qualification
1	Montreal Victoire (Y)	30	16	6	2	6	78	41	+37	62 (Note: Greater number of games won, excluding games won by Shootout: Montreal 19, Boston 18)	Playoffs
2	Boston Fleet	30	16	5	4	5	74	45	+29	62	Playoffs
3	Minnesota Frost	30	13	3	5	9	91	73	+18	50	Playoffs
4	Ottawa Charge	30	9	8	1	12	71	73	−2	44	Playoffs
5	Toronto Sceptres	30	10	1	6	13	51	72	−21	38	
6	Vancouver Goldeneyes	30	9	3	4	14	68	81	−13	37	
7	New York Sirens	30	9	3	3	15	63	83	−20	36	
8	Seattle Torrent	30	8	1	5	16	64	92	−28	31	

Updated to match(es) played on April 25, 2026. Source: PWHL
(Y) Regular season winner

=== Regular season ===
The regular season schedule was published on October 1, 2025.

Regular season schedule (Home: 7–2–2–4; Road: 2–1–1–11)
November: 2–0–0–1, 6 points (Home: 1–0–0–0; Road: 1–0–0–1)

Game	Date	Opponent	Score	OT	Decision	Location	Attendance	Record	Points	Box Score/Recap
1	November 22	@ Ottawa	4–0		Osborne	TD Place Arena	7,371	1–0–0–0	3	
2	November 25	@ Montreal	0–4		Osborne	Place Bell	8,391	1–0–0–1	3	
3	November 29	Vancouver	5–1		Osborne	Prudential Center	3,517	2–0–0–1	6	

December: 2–0–0–4, 6 points (Home: 2–0–0–2; Road: 0–0–0–2)

Game	Date	Opponent	Score	OT	Decision	Location	Attendance	Record	Points	Box Score/Recap
4	December 3	@ Seattle	1–2		Osborne	Climate Pledge Arena	8,622	2–0–0–2	6	
5	December 6	@ Vancouver	0–4		Osborne	Pacific Coliseum	9,502	2–0–0–3	6	
6	December 17	Boston	0–2		Osborne	Prudential Center	1,884	2–0–0–4	6	
7	December 21	Toronto	3–4		Osborne	Prudential Center	3,517	2–0–0–5	6	
8	December 28	Seattle	4–3		Osborne	American Airlines Center	8,514	3–0–0–5	9	
9	December 31	Vancouver	2–0		Osborne	Prudential Center	2,735	4–0–0–5	12	

January: 3–0–3–1, 12 points (Home: 2–0–2–0; Road: 1–0–1–1)

Game	Date	Opponent	Score	OT	Decision	Location	Attendance	Record	Points	Box Score/Recap
10	January 2	Montreal	4–3		Osborne	Prudential Center	3,513	5–0–0–5	15	
11	January 6	@ Toronto	2–0		Osborne	Coca-Cola Coliseum	7,924	6–0–0–5	18	
12	January 16	Minnesota	2–3	OT	Osborne	Prudential Center	4,244	6–0–1–5	19	
13	January 18	Montreal	2–1		Osborne	Capital One Arena	17,228	7–0–1–5	22	
14	January 20	Ottawa	3–4	OT	Shanahan	Prudential Center	2,759	7–0–2–5	23	
15	January 25	@ Minnesota	2–6		Osborne	Grand Casino Arena	7,752	7–0–2–6	23	
16	January 28	@ Boston	3–4	SO	Osborne	Tsongas Center	4,697	7–0–3–6	24	

February: 0–0–0–1, 0 points (Home: 0–0–0–1; Road: 0–0–0–0)

Game	Date	Opponent	Score	OT	Decision	Location	Attendance	Record	Points	Box Score/Recap
17	February 26	Montreal	1–4		Osborne	Prudential Center	3,488	7–0–3–7	24	

March: 1–0–0–5, 3 points (Home: 1–0–0–1; Road: 0–0–0–4)

Game	Date	Opponent	Score	OT	Decision	Location	Attendance	Record	Points	Box Score/Recap
18	March 5	Boston	0–1		Osborne	Prudential Center	3,765	7–0–3–8	24	
19	March 8	Ottawa	6–2		Osborne	Prudential Center	8,264	8–0–3–8	27	
20	March 15	@ Minnesota	3–4		Osborne	Ball Arena	15,512	8–0–3–9	27	
21	March 18	@ Vancouver	2–5		Osborne	Pacific Coliseum	9,296	8–0–3–10	27	
22	March 25	@ Seattle	1–4		Osborne	Allstate Arena	10,006	8–0–3–11	27	
23	March 28	@ Montreal	1–3		Osborne	Little Caesars Arena	15,938	8–0–3–12	27	

April: 1–3–0–3, 9 points (Home: 1–2–0–0; Road: 0–1–0–3)

Game	Date	Opponent	Score	OT	Decision	Location	Attendance	Record	Points	Box Score/Recap
24	April 1	Minnesota	4–3	OT	Shanahan	Prudential Center	4,265	8–1–3–12	29	
25	April 4	Seattle	2–1	SO	Osborne	Madison Square Garden	18,006	8–2–3–12	31	
26	April 11	@ Minnesota	1–4		Osborne	Grand Casino Arena	9,159	8–2–3–13	31	
27	April 15	Toronto	3–2		Osborne	Prudential Center	6,273	9–2–3–13	34	
28	April 18	@ Ottawa	1–5		Osborne	TD Place Arena	8,605	9–2–3–14	34	
29	April 21	@ Toronto	1–0	OT	Osborne	Coca-Cola Coliseum	8,685	9–3–3–14	36	
30	April 25	@ Boston	0–4		Shanahan	Tsongas Center	6,120	9–3–3–15	36	

Regulation Win (3 points) Overtime/Shootout win (2 points) Overtime/shootout loss (1 point) Regulation Loss (0 points)

== Player statistics ==
As of April 25, 2026

=== Skaters ===
Regular Season
Player	GP	G	A	Pts	SOG	+/−	PIM
Sarah Fillier	29	9	14	23	104	–5	14
Casey O'Brien	28	7	15	22	63	–7	2
Kristýna Kaltounková	21	11	1	12	81	0	45
Maja Nylén Persson	30	2	9	11	46	–8	16
Paetyn Levis	30	5	5	10	55	–7	10
Maddi Wheeler	29	3	7	10	51	+1	24
Jaime Bourbonnais	28	1	9	10	48	–7	12
Anne Cherkowski	28	2	7	9	75	–11	2
Taylor Girard	17	7	1	8	37	+2	34
Elle Hartje	29	0	7	7	28	+3	6
Anna Bargman	29	4	2	6	21	–3	6
Kristin O'Neill	30	4	1	5	59	–9	14
Allyson Simpson	30	3	2	5	42	–1	16
Micah Zandee-Hart	29	1	3	4	37	0	50
Nicole Vallario	11	1	2	3	7	–1	2
Denisa Křížová	7	1	1	2	11	–4	4
Savannah Norcross	23	1	1	2	16	–3	4
Clair DeGeorge	9	0	2	2	10	+1	2
Lauren Bernard	30	0	2	2	24	–6	2
Kayla Vespa	30	0	2	2	22	0	6
Emmy Fecteau	28	0	1	1	16	–6	27
Olivia Knowles	3	0	0	0	0	0	0
Kira Juodikis	4	0	0	0	1	–2	0
Dayle Ross	16	0	0	0	11	–3	0

=== Goaltenders ===
Regular Season
Player	GP	TOI	W	L	OT	SOL	GA	GAA	SA	SV%	SO	G	A	PIM
Kayle Osborne	27	1579:17	11	14	1	1	65	2.47	693	0.906	4	0	0	0
Callie Shanahan	4	218:11	1	1	1	0	11	3.02	85	0.871	0	0	0	0

== Awards and honors ==
=== Milestones ===
Regular season
Date	Player	Milestone
November 22, 2025	Taylor Girard	1st career PWHL hat-trick
November 22, 2025	Maddi Wheeler	1st career PWHL assist
November 22, 2025	Maddi Wheeler	1st career PWHL penalty
November 22, 2025	Maddi Wheeler	1st career PWHL game
November 22, 2025	Kristýna Kaltounková	1st career PWHL penalty
November 22, 2025	Kristýna Kaltounková	1st career PWHL game
November 22, 2025	Anna Bargman	1st career PWHL game
November 22, 2025	Anne Cherkowski	1st career PWHL game
November 22, 2025	Casey O'Brien	1st career PWHL game
November 29, 2025	Paetyn Levis	5th career PWHL goal
November 29, 2025	Nicole Vallario	1st career PWHL goal
November 29, 2025	Nicole Vallario	1st career PWHL game
November 29, 2025	Kristýna Kaltounková	1st career PWHL goal
November 29, 2025	Allyson Simpson	5th career PWHL assist
November 29, 2025	Anne Cherkowski	1st career PWHL assist
November 29, 2025	Casey O'Brien	1st career PWHL assist
December 3, 2025	Lauren Bernard	5th career PWHL assist
December 3, 2025	Anne Cherkowski	1st career PWHL penalty
December 21, 2025	Maja Nylén Persson	5th career PWHL assist
December 28, 2025	Casey O'Brien	1st career PWHL goal
December 28, 2025	Casey O'Brien	1st career PWHL hat-trick
December 28, 2025	Maddi Wheeler	1st career PWHL goal
December 28, 2025	Jaime Bourbonnais	15th career PWHL assist
December 28, 2025	Taylor Girard	5th career PWHL assist
December 31, 2025	Savannah Norcross	1st career PWHL goal
December 31, 2025	Anna Bargman	1st career PWHL assist
December 31, 2025	Emmy Fecteau	1st career PWHL assist
January 2, 2026	Kristin O'Neill	10th career PWHL goal
January 2, 2026	Kristýna Kaltounková	5th career PWHL goal
January 2, 2026	Anna Bargman	1st career PWHL goal
January 2, 2026	Maddi Wheeler	5th career PWHL assist
January 6, 2026	Jincy Roese	20th career PWHL assist
January 16, 2026	Taylor Girard	10th career PWHL goal
January 16, 2026	Sarah Fillier	20th career PWHL assist
January 18, 2026	Anne Cherkowski	1st career PWHL goal
January 18, 2026	Paetyn Levis	10th career PWHL assist
January 20, 2026	Casey O'Brien	5th career PWHL assist
January 20, 2026	Kristýna Kaltounková	1st career PWHL assist
January 20, 2026	Callie Shanahan	1st career PWHL game
January 20, 2026	Callie Shanahan	1st career PWHL loss
January 28, 2026	Kristýna Kaltounková	10th career PWHL goal
January 28, 2026	Micah Zandee-Hart	15th career PWHL assist
February 26, 2026	Casey O'Brien	5th career PWHL goal
March 8, 2026	Sarah Fillier	15th career PWHL goal
March 8, 2026	Elle Hartje	10th career PWHL assist
March 8, 2026	Anne Cherkowski	5th career PWHL assist
March 15, 2026	Jaime Bourbonnais	20th career PWHL assist
March 18, 2026	Maja Nylén Persson	10th career PWHL assist
March 18, 2026	Nicole Vallario	1st career PWHL assist
March 25, 2026	Casey O'Brien	10th career PWHL assist
March 25, 2026	Casey O'Brien	1st career PWHL penalty
April 1, 2026	Sarah Fillier	20th career PWHL goal
April 1, 2026	Sarah Fillier	1st career PWHL hat trick
April 1, 2026	Callie Shanahan	1st career PWHL win
April 15, 2026	Clair DeGeorge	5th career PWHL assist
April 21, 2026	Sarah Fillier	30th career PWHL assist
April 21, 2026	Casey O'Brien	15th career PWHL assist

=== Three Star Awards ===
==== Player of the Week ====
Player of the Week recipients
Week	Player
November 24, 2025	Taylor Girard
December 29, 2025	Casey O'Brien
January 29, 2026	Kristýna Kaltounková
April 6, 2026	Sarah Fillier

==== Starting Six ====
The Starting Six is voted on each month by the Women's Chapter of the Professional Hockey Writers' Association (PHWA) and PWHL broadcast personnel. The following are New York Sirens players who have been named to the Starting Six.

Starting Six players
Month	Position	Player
November	F	Taylor Girard
January	F	Kristýna Kaltounková

== Transactions ==
=== Draft ===
The 2025 PWHL Draft was held on June 24, 2025. Colgate University forward Kristýna Kaltounková was selected first overall by the New York Sirens, becoming the highest drafted player from the Czech Republic and the first European to be granted the top pick.

Drafted prospect signings
Date	Player	Draft	Term	Ref
September 8, 2025	Kristýna Kaltounková	First round, first overall (2025)	Three years	
September 12, 2025	Anne Cherkowski	Second round, 13th overall (2025)	Three years	
October 6, 2025	Dayle Ross	Fourth round, 25th overall (2025)	One year	
November 18, 2025	Casey O'Brien	First round, 3rd overall (2025)	One year	
November 18, 2025	Maddi Wheeler	Fourth round, 27th overall (2025)	One year	
November 18, 2025	Anna Bargman	Fifth round, 33rd overall (2025)	One year	
November 18, 2025	Kaley Doyle	Sixth round, 41st overall (2025)	One year	

=== Free agency ===
The free agency period began on June 16, 2025, at 9:00 am ET, with a pause between June 27 and July 8. Prior to the start of the free agency period, there was an exclusive signing window from June 4–8 for the Seattle and Vancouver expansion teams.

Free agent signings
Date	Player	Previous team	Term	Ref
June 18, 2025	Jincy Roese	Ottawa Charge	One year	
June 21, 2025	Savannah Norcross	Luleå HF (SDHL)	One year	
November 20, 2025	Nicole Vallario	EV Zug Women's Team (SWHL A)	Reserve player contract (Note: Signed a standard player agreement following training camp to fill in for Dayle Ross who is on LTIR. Length of contract has not been specified.)	

=== Contract extensions/terminations ===
Player contract extensions
Date	Player	Term	Ref
June 18, 2025	Taylor Girard	One year	
June 20, 2025	Lauren Bernard	One year	
June 20, 2025	Kayla Vespa	One year	
July 9, 2025	Allyson Simpson	Two years	
July 10, 2025	Sarah Fillier	Two years	
September 22, 2025	Maja Nylén Persson	Three years (Note: This three-year contract represents a one-year extension (through the 2027–28 season) to the original three-year contract she signed after being drafted last year.)	
November 5, 2025	Micah Zandee-Hart	One year (Note: Extension will come into effect for the 2026–27 season.)	
November 18, 2025	Jaime Bourbonnais	One year	
November 18, 2025	Kayle Osborne	One year (Note: Extension will come into effect for the 2027–28 season.)	
November 20, 2025	Olivia Knowles	Reserve player contract (Note: Was a reserve player for the 2024–25 season.)	

Player contract terminations
Date	Player	Term remaining	Ref
July 27, 2025	Noora Tulus	One year	

=== Trades ===
Trades involving the New York Sirens
Date	Details		Ref
June 24, 2025	To New York Sirens First round pick – 2025 PWHL Draft (#3 – Casey O'Brien); Fourth round pick – 2025 PWHL Draft (#27 – Maddi Wheeler)	To Toronto Sceptres Ella Shelton	
June 24, 2025	To New York Sirens Kristin O'Neill; Fourth round pick – 2025 PWHL Draft (#28 – Callie Shanahan)	To Montreal Victoire Abby Roque	

=== Reserve activations ===
Reserve player activations
Date	Activated player	Absent player	Notes	Ref
November 20, 2025	Nicole Vallario	Dayle Ross	LTIR	
December 18, 2025	Olivia Knowles (Note: This transaction returns Nicole Vallario to the reserve player roster.)	Dayle Ross	LTIR	
