= 2025–26 Boston Fleet season =

Professional Women's Hockey League season

2025–26 Boston Fleet
- League: 2nd PWHL
- 2025–26 record: 16–5–4–5
- Home record: 9–1–2–3
- Road record: 7–4–2–2
- Goals for: 74
- Goals against: 45

Team information
- General manager: Danielle Marmer
- Coach: Kris Sparre
- Captain: Megan Keller
- Alternate captains: Alina Müller; Jamie Lee Rattray
- Arena: Tsongas Center; Agganis Arena
- Average attendance: 5,991

Team leaders
- Goals: Susanna Tapani (9)
- Assists: Alina Müller (17)
- Points: Megan Keller (22)
- Penalty minutes: Laura Kluge (25)
- Plus/minus: Abby Newhook (+17)
- Wins: Aerin Frankel (19)
- Goals against average: Aerin Frankel (1.17)

The 2025–26 Boston Fleet season is the team's third season as a member of the Professional Women's Hockey League. They play their home games at the Tsongas Center in Lowell, Massachusetts and at Agganis Arena in Boston, Massachusetts.

== Offseason ==
=== Coaching changes ===
On June 23, 2025, former Fleet head coach Courtney Birchard-Kessel was named head coach of the NCAA's Princeton Tigers women's program. She previously served as an assistant coach for the Tigers under Cara Gardner Morey, who relinquished her role to become the inaugural general manager of Vancouver Goldeneyes.

One month later, on July 23, the Fleet named Kris Sparre as their new head coach. He most recently served as an assistant coach for the San Diego Gulls, the American Hockey League affiliate of the NHL's Anaheim Ducks.

On October 15, 2025, the Fleet announced the hiring of Jordan Lavallée Smotherman, Derek Whitmore, and Kacey Bellamy to the coaching staff. Smotherman served as head coach of HC Innsbruck during the 2024–25 ICE Hockey League season. Whitmore most recently served as an assistant coach for the Chicago Steel of the USHL. Bellamy is an Olympic gold medallist and eight–time IIHF Women's World Championship gold medallist who served as a scout and player liaison during the 2022–23 PHF season.

== Schedule and results ==
=== Preseason ===
The preseason schedule was published on October 8, 2025.

Pre-season camp

Date	Opponent	Score	OT	Decision	Location	Box Score/Recap
November 15	@ Montreal	2–3	OT	Levy	Verdun Auditorium	
November 17	@ Montreal	2–3		Thiele	Verdun Auditorium	

=== Standings ===
Pos	Team	Pld	W	OTW	OTL	L	GF	GA	GD	Pts	Qualification
1	Montreal Victoire (Y)	30	16	6	2	6	78	41	+37	62 (Note: Greater number of games won, excluding games won by Shootout: Montreal 19, Boston 18)	Playoffs
2	Boston Fleet	30	16	5	4	5	74	45	+29	62	Playoffs
3	Minnesota Frost	30	13	3	5	9	91	73	+18	50	Playoffs
4	Ottawa Charge	30	9	8	1	12	71	73	−2	44	Playoffs
5	Toronto Sceptres	30	10	1	6	13	51	72	−21	38	
6	Vancouver Goldeneyes	30	9	3	4	14	68	81	−13	37	
7	New York Sirens	30	9	3	3	15	63	83	−20	36	
8	Seattle Torrent	30	8	1	5	16	64	92	−28	31	

Updated to match(es) played on April 25, 2026. Source: PWHL
(Y) Regular season winner

=== Regular season ===
The regular season schedule was published on October 1, 2025.

After a start to the season described as slow, the Fleet reached the top spot in the PWHL in December of 2025. As of January 2026, they remained first in the league.

Regular season schedule (Home: 9–1–2–3; Road: 7–4–2–2)
November: 2–0–0–0, 6 points (Home: 1–0–0–0; Road: 1–0–0–0)

Game	Date	Opponent	Score	OT	Decision	Location	Attendance	Record	Points	Box Score/Recap
1	November 23	Montreal	2–0		Frankel	Tsongas Center	5,166	1–0–0–0	3	
2	November 29	@ Toronto	3–1		Frankel	Coca-Cola Coliseum	8,277	2–0–0–0	6	

December: 4–0–1–1, 13 points (Home: 2–0–0–0; Road: 2–0–1–1)

Game	Date	Opponent	Score	OT	Decision	Location	Attendance	Record	Points	Box Score/Recap
3	December 3	Vancouver	2–0		Frankel	Agganis Arena	3,516	3–0–0–0	9	
4	December 7	Minnesota	4–1		Frankel	Agganis Arena	5,338	4–0–0–0	12	
5	December 17	@ New York	2–0		Frankel	Prudential Center	1,884	5–0–0–0	15	
6	December 19	@ Minnesota	2–5		Frankel	Grand Casino Arena	7,216	5–0–0–1	15	
7	December 21	@ Seattle	3–1		Levy	Climate Pledge Arena	11,023	6–0–0–1	18	
8	December 27	@ Ottawa	2–3	SO	Frankel	TD Place Arena	8,497	6–0–1–1	19	

January: 2–2–1–1, 11 points (Home: 2–1–1–1; Road: 0–1–0–0)

Game	Date	Opponent	Score	OT	Decision	Location	Attendance	Record	Points	Box Score/Recap
9	January 3	Vancouver	3–4		Frankel	Little Caesars Arena	9,624	6–0–1–2	19	
10	January 7	Seattle	2–1		Frankel	Agganis Arena	6,003	7–0–1–2	22	
11	January 11	Ottawa	1–2	SO	Frankel	Scotiabank Centre	10,452	7–0–2–2	23	
12	January 14	Toronto	2–1		Frankel	Tsongas Center	3,372	8–0–2–2	26	
13	January 18	@ Seattle	2–1	SO	Frankel	Climate Pledge Arena	12,774	8–1–2–2	28	
14	January 28	New York	4–3	SO	Frankel	Tsongas Center	4,697	8–2–2–2	30	

February: 0–1–0–0, 2 points (Home: 0–0–0–0; Road: 0–1–0–0)

Game	Date	Opponent	Score	OT	Decision	Location	Attendance	Record	Points	Box Score/Recap
15	February 28	@ Ottawa	3–2	SO	Frankel	TD Place Arena	8,572	8–3–2–2	32	

March: 5–2–0–2, 19 points (Home: 2–0–0–1; Road: 3–2–0–1)

Game	Date	Opponent	Score	OT	Decision	Location	Attendance	Record	Points	Box Score/Recap
16	March 5	@ New York	1–0		Frankel	Prudential Center	3,765	9–3–2–2	35	
17	March 10	@ Vancouver	2–1	OT	Frankel	Pacific Coliseum	9,731	9–4–2–2	37	
18	March 11	@ Seattle	2–3		Levy	Climate Pledge Arena	13,350	9–4–2–3	37	
19	March 15	@ Montreal	4–3	OT	Frankel	Place Bell	10,172	9–5–2–3	39	
20	March 17	Toronto	0–2		Frankel	Agganis Arena	6,095	9–5–2–4	39	
21	March 21	Seattle	3–0		Frankel	Tsongas Center	6,164	10–5–2–4	42	
22	March 24	Vancouver	2–0		Frankel	Tsongas Center	4,178	11–5–2–4	45	
23	March 27	@ Toronto	4–0		Frankel	Coca-Cola Coliseum	8,636	12–5–2–4	48	
24	March 29	@ Minnesota	4–2		Thiele	Grand Casino Arena	9,925	13–5–2–4	51	

April: 3–0–2–1, 11 points (Home: 2–0–1–1; Road: 1–0–1–0)

Game	Date	Opponent	Score	OT	Decision	Location	Attendance	Record	Points	Box Score/Recap
25	April 7	@ Vancouver	5–1		Frankel	Rogers Place	10,794	14–5–2–4	54	
26	April 11	Montreal	0–1		Frankel	TD Garden	17,850	14–5–2–5	54	
27	April 15	Minnesota	3–2		Frankel	Tsongas Center	4,170	15–5–2–5	57	
28	April 17	@ Montreal	2–3	OT	Levy	Place Bell	10,172	15–5–3–5	58	
29	April 22	Ottawa	1–2	OT	Frankel	Tsongas Center	5,215	15–5–4–5	59	
30	April 25	New York	4–0		Frankel	Tsongas Center	6,120	16–5–4–5	62	

Regulation Win (3 points) Overtime/Shootout win (2 points) Overtime/shootout loss (1 point) Regulation Loss (0 points)

=== Playoffs ===
Boston clinched second place in the league on the final day of the regular season. They finished with 62 points, which tied with the Montreal Victoire for first place, but Montreal won the tiebreaker. Montreal chose to play the third-seeded Minnesota Frost, which meant that Boston would take on the fourth-seeded Ottawa Charge in the first round.

2026 Walter Cup playoffs
First round vs. Ottawa Charge; Ottawa won 3–1

Game	Date	Opponent	Score	OT	Decision	Location	Attendance	Series	Recap
1	April 30	Ottawa	2–1		Frankel	Tsongas Center	4,285	1–0	
2	May 2	Ottawa	1–3		Frankel	Tsongas Center	6,017	1–1	
3	May 8	@ Ottawa	1–2		Frankel	Canadian Tire Centre	13,112	1–2	
4	May 10	@ Ottawa	3–4	2OT	Frankel	Canadian Tire Centre	11,297	1–3	

== Player statistics ==
As of May 10, 2026

=== Skaters ===
Regular Season
Player	GP	G	A	Pts	SOG	+/−	PIM
Megan Keller	30	7	15	22	68	+10	8
Alina Müller	30	4	17	21	62	+10	8
Haley Winn	30	5	14	19	92	+3	6
Susanna Tapani	30	9	9	18	62	+11	10
Abby Newhook	29	7	7	14	43	+17	6
Jamie Lee Rattray	30	4	8	12	41	+4	10
Jessie Eldridge	11	7	3	10	30	+4	0
Liz Schepers	29	5	4	9	44	+2	2
Sophie Shirley	22	3	6	9	17	+6	8
Shay Maloney	30	3	4	7	47	+1	10
Hadley Hartmetz	27	0	7	7	20	+7	8
Ella Huber	30	4	2	6	58	–3	12
Jill Saulnier	25	2	4	6	37	+1	24
Olivia Mobley	10	3	2	5	22	0	4
Daniela Pejšová	27	2	2	4	34	+6	6
Riley Brengman	28	2	1	3	26	+4	14
Hannah Brandt	30	0	3	3	28	0	12
Loren Gabel	16	1	1	2	24	+1	8
Laura Kluge	25	1	1	2	12	+1	25
Mia Biotti	13	0	2	2	2	+3	0
Zoe Boyd	12	0	1	1	15	+2	4
Rylind MacKinnon	28	0	1	1	10	+6	14
Noemi Neubauerová	3	0	0	0	0	0	2
Olivia Zafuto	6	0	0	0	1	0	0

Playoffs
Player	GP	G	A	Pts	SOG	+/−	PIM
Alina Müller	4	1	3	4	22	0	2
Jessie Eldridge	4	0	3	3	20	+1	4
Megan Keller	4	2	0	2	10	0	2
Shay Maloney	4	1	1	2	5	+2	0
Ella Huber	4	0	2	2	12	0	0
Haley Winn	4	0	2	2	10	+2	2
Jamie Lee Rattray	4	1	0	1	4	–1	2
Liz Schepers	4	1	0	1	8	+1	0
Sophie Shirley	4	1	0	1	3	+1	0
Abby Newhook	4	0	1	1	16	–1	0
Jill Saulnier	4	0	1	1	5	–1	2
Noemi Neubauerová	1	0	0	0	0	0	0
Mia Biotti	2	0	0	0	0	0	2
Laura Kluge	2	0	0	0	1	0	0
Rylind MacKinnon	3	0	0	0	0	–1	15
Hannah Brandt	4	0	0	0	1	–2	0
Riley Brengman	4	0	0	0	4	–2	2
Hadley Hartmetz	4	0	0	0	6	–1	0
Olivia Mobley	4	0	0	0	6	–4	2
Daniela Pejšová	4	0	0	0	6	–2	4
Susanna Tapani	4	0	0	0	3	–3	0

=== Goaltenders ===
Regular Season
Player	GP	TOI	W	L	OT	SOL	GA	GAA	SA	SV%	SO	G	A	PIM
Aerin Frankel	26	1583:12	19	4	1	2	31	1.17	662	0.953	8	0	0	0
Abbey Levy	3	180:38	1	1	1	0	7	2.33	96	0.927	0	0	0	0
Amanda Thiele	1	60:00	1	0	0	0	2	2.00	23	0.913	0	0	0	0

Playoffs
Player	GP	TOI	W	L	OT	SOL	GA	GAA	SA	SV%	SO	G	A	PIM
Aerin Frankel	4	258:55	1	2	1	0	9	2.09	93	0.903	0	0	0	0

== Awards and honors ==
=== Milestones ===
Regular season
Date	Player	Milestone
November 23, 2025	Megan Keller	10th career PWHL goal
November 23, 2025	Riley Brengman	1st career PWHL game
November 23, 2025	Ella Huber	1st career PWHL game
November 23, 2025	Abby Newhook	1st career PWHL game
November 23, 2025	Haley Winn	1st career PWHL game
November 29, 2025	Susanna Tapani	20th career PWHL goal
November 29, 2025	Alina Müller	15th career PWHL goal
November 29, 2025	Abby Newhook	1st career PWHL goal
November 29, 2025	Hannah Brandt	15th career PWHL assist
November 29, 2025	Jill Saulnier	5th career PWHL assist
November 29, 2025	Olivia Mobley	1st career PWHL game
December 3, 2025	Hadley Hartmetz	1st career PWHL assist
December 7, 2025	Sophie Shirley	10th career PWHL assist
December 7, 2025	Riley Brengman	1st career PWHL assist
December 7, 2025	Haley Winn	1st career PWHL assist
December 17, 2025	Ella Huber	1st career PWHL goal
December 17, 2025	Ella Huber	1st career PWHL penalty
December 17, 2025	Aerin Frankel	5th career PWHL shutout
December 19, 2025	Olivia Mobley	1st career PWHL goal
December 19, 2025	Olivia Mobley	1st career PWHL assist
December 19, 2025	Riley Brengman	1st career PWHL goal
December 21, 2025	Hadley Hartmetz	1st career PWHL penalty
December 27, 2025	Haley Winn	1st career PWHL goal
December 27, 2025	Susanna Tapani	20th career PWHL assist
December 27, 2025	Riley Brengman	1st career PWHL assist
December 27, 2025	Olivia Mobley	1st career PWHL penalty
January 3, 2026	Theresa Schafzahl	10th career PWHL assist
January 3, 2026	Mia Biotti	1st career PWHL game
January 7, 2026	Haley Winn	5th career PWHL assist
January 14, 2026	Shay Maloney	5th career PWHL goal
January 18, 2026	Abby Newhook	1st career PWHL assist
January 18, 2026	Alina Müller	30th career PWHL assist
January 28, 2026	Jamie Lee Rattray	10th career PWHL goal
February 28, 2026	Abby Newhook	5th career PWHL goal
February 28, 2026	Megan Keller	30th career PWHL assist
March 10, 2026	Jamie Lee Rattray	20th career PWHL assist
March 11, 2026	Loren Gabel	5th career PWHL assist
March 15, 2026	Megan Keller	15th career PWHL goal
March 21, 2026	Daniela Pejšová	5th career PWHL assist
March 24, 2026	Laura Kluge	1st career PWHL goal
March 24, 2026	Haley Winn	10th career PWHL assist
March 24, 2026	Mia Biotti	1st career PWHL assist
March 27, 2026	Sophie Shirley	5th career PWHL goal
March 27, 2026	Hadley Hartmetz	5th career PWHL assist
March 27, 2026	Aerin Frankel	10th career PWHL shutout
March 29, 2026	Liz Schepers	10th career PWHL goal
March 29, 2026	Riley Brengman	1st career PWHL assist
March 29, 2026	Amanda Thiele	1st career PWHL win
March 29, 2026	Amanda Thiele	1st career PWHL game
April 7, 2026	Abby Newhook	5th career PWHL assist
April 15, 2026	Alina Müller	40th career PWHL assist
April 15, 2026	Jessie Eldridge	30th career PWHL assist
April 17, 2026	Shay Maloney	10th career PWHL assist
April 25, 2026	Jessie Eldridge	30th career PWHL goal
April 25, 2026	Jill Saulnier	5th career PWHL goal
April 25, 2026	Haley Winn	5th career PWHL goal

Playoffs
Date	Player	Milestone
April 30, 2026	Jamie Lee Rattray	1st career PWHL playoff goal
April 30, 2026	Jessie Eldridge	1st career PWHL playoff assist
May 2, 2026	Megan Keller	1st career PWHL playoff goal
May 2, 2026	Abby Newhook	1st career PWHL playoff assist
May 8, 2026	Shay Maloney	1st career PWHL playoff assist
May 8, 2026	Ella Huber	1st career PWHL playoff assist
May 10, 2026	Shay Maloney	1st career PWHL playoff goal
May 10, 2026	Haley Winn	1st career PWHL playoff assist
May 10, 2026	Haley Winn	15th career PWHL assist
May 10, 2026	Jill Saulnier	1st career PWHL playoff assist

=== Player of the Week Awards ===
==== Player of the Week ====
Player of the Week recipients
Week	Player
January 19, 2026	Aerin Frankel
March 16, 2026	Megan Keller
March 30, 2026	Aerin Frankel

==== Starting Six ====
The Starting Six is voted on each month by the Women's Chapter of the Professional Hockey Writers' Association (PHWA) and PWHL broadcast personnel. The following are Boston Fleet players who have been named to the Starting Six.

Starting Six players
Month	Position	Player
November	F	Susanna Tapani
November	D	Megan Keller
November	G	Aerin Frankel
December	D	Megan Keller
December	D	Haley Winn
December	G	Aerin Frankel
January	D	Megan Keller
March (Note: This includes the post-Olympic games from February 26–28.)	F	Susanna Tapani
March	D	Haley Winn
March	G	Aerin Frankel

== Transactions ==
=== Draft ===
The 2025 PWHL Draft was held on June 24, 2025.

Drafted prospect signings
Date	Player	Draft	Term	Ref
August 13, 2025	Ella Huber	Second round, 10th overall (2025)	Two years	
August 20, 2025	Haley Winn	First round, second overall (2025)	Three years	
November 20, 2025	Olivia Mobley	Third round, 18th overall (2025)	One year	
November 20, 2025	Riley Brengman	Fourth round, 26th overall (2025)	One year	
November 20, 2025	Abby Newhook	Fifth round, 34th overall (2025)	One year	
November 20, 2025	Amanda Thiele	Sixth round, 42nd overall (2025)	One year	

=== Free agency ===
The free agency period began on June 16, 2025 at 9:00 am ET, with a pause between June 27 and July 8. Prior to the start of the free agency period, there was an exclusive signing window from June 4–8 for the Seattle and Vancouver expansion teams.

Free agent signings
Date	Player	Previous team	Term	Ref
June 18, 2025	Chloé Aurard	New York Sirens	One year	
June 18, 2025	Liz Schepers	Minnesota Frost	Two years	
June 20, 2025	Zoe Boyd	Ottawa Charge	One year	
June 20, 2025	Rylind MacKinnon	Toronto Sceptres	One year	
June 20, 2025	Abbey Levy	New York Sirens	One year	
June 20, 2025	Laura Kluge	Toronto Sceptres	One year	
November 20, 2025	Loren Gabel	Boston Fleet (Note: Initially signed to a one year contract extension that was terminated and replaced with a reserve player contract.)	Reserve player contract	
November 20, 2025	Mia Biotti	Harvard University (ECAC)	Reserve player contract	

=== Contract extensions/terminations ===
Player contract extensions
Date	Player	Term	Ref
June 17, 2025	Susanna Tapani	One year	
June 17, 2025	Jill Saulnier	One year	
June 17, 2025	Theresa Schafzahl	One year	
June 27, 2025	Hadley Hartmetz	One year	
July 14, 2025	Shay Maloney	Two years	
July 24, 2025	Loren Gabel	One year	
August 4, 2025	Aerin Frankel	Two years (Note: Extension will come into effect for the 2026–27 season.)	
August 4, 2025	Megan Keller	Two years	
August 4, 2025	Alina Müller	Two years	
November 20, 2025	Olivia Zafuto	Reserve player contract (Note: Was a reserve player for the 2024–25 season.)	

Player contract terminations
Date	Player	Term remaining	Ref
November 19, 2025	Chloé Aurard	One year (Note: Released from preseason/training camp.)	
November 20, 2025	Loren Gabel	One year	

=== Retirements ===
Player retirements
Date	Player	Team(s)	Ref
August 5, 2025	Jillian Dempsey	Montreal Victoire (2024), Boston Fleet (2024–25)	
September 2, 2025	Amanda Pelkey	Boston Fleet (2024–25)	

=== Reserve activations ===
Reserve player activations
Date	Activated player	Absent player	Notes	Ref
November 23, 2025	Olivia Zafuto	Zoe Boyd	10 day contract	
January 3, 2026	Mia Biotti	TBD	10 day contract	
