= 2025–26 Montreal Victoire season =

Professional Women's Hockey League season

2025–26 Montreal Victoire
- Walter Cup champions
- League: 1st PWHL
- 2025–26 record: 16–6–2–6
- Home record: 11–2–1–1
- Road record: 5–4–1–5
- Goals for: 78
- Goals against: 41

Team information
- General manager: Danièle Sauvageau
- Coach: Kori Cheverie
- Captain: Marie-Philip Poulin
- Alternate captains: Erin Ambrose; Laura Stacey
- Arena: Place Bell
- Average attendance: 9,950

Team leaders
- Goals: Marie-Philip Poulin (9)
- Assists: Nicole Gosling (16)
- Points: Abby Roque; Laura Stacey (22)
- Penalty minutes: Maggie Flaherty (35)
- Plus/minus: Nicole Gosling; Laura Stacey (+16)
- Wins: Ann-Renée Desbiens (19)
- Goals against average: Ann-Renée Desbiens (1.11)

The 2025–26 Montreal Victoire season was the team's third season as a member of the Professional Women's Hockey League.

Finishing the regular season with a 17–5–2–6 record overall, the Victoire tied the Boston Fleet to lead the league with a record 62 points, winning their second consecutive regular season title on the tiebreaker after a shootout victory over the Seattle Torrent in the final game of the season. This included a 11–2–1–1 record on home ice. In the 2026 Walter Cup playoffs, the Victoire first defeated the Minnesota Frost in the semi-final, the club's first postseason series victory. Facing the Ottawa Charge in the 2026 Walter Cup Finals, the Victoire prevailed in a four-game series, becoming the first Canadian team to hoist the Walter Cup.

== Schedule and results ==
=== Preseason ===
The preseason schedule was published on October 8, 2025.

Pre-season camp

Date	Opponent	Score	OT	Decision	Location	Box Score/Recap
November 15	Boston	3–2	OT	Warrener	Verdun Auditorium	
November 17	Boston	3–2		Abstreiter	Verdun Auditorium	

=== Standings ===
Pos	Team	Pld	W	OTW	OTL	L	GF	GA	GD	Pts	Qualification
1	Montreal Victoire (Y)	30	16	6	2	6	78	41	+37	62 (Note: Greater number of games won, excluding games won by Shootout: Montreal 19, Boston 18)	Playoffs
2	Boston Fleet	30	16	5	4	5	74	45	+29	62	Playoffs
3	Minnesota Frost	30	13	3	5	9	91	73	+18	50	Playoffs
4	Ottawa Charge	30	9	8	1	12	71	73	−2	44	Playoffs
5	Toronto Sceptres	30	10	1	6	13	51	72	−21	38	
6	Vancouver Goldeneyes	30	9	3	4	14	68	81	−13	37	
7	New York Sirens	30	9	3	3	15	63	83	−20	36	
8	Seattle Torrent	30	8	1	5	16	64	92	−28	31	

Updated to match(es) played on April 25, 2026. Source: PWHL
(Y) Regular season winner

=== Regular season ===
The regular season schedule was published on October 1, 2025.

Regular season schedule (Home: 11–2–1–1; Road: 5–4–1–5)
November: 1–0–0–1, 3 points (Home: 1–0–0–0; Road: 0–0–0–1)

Game	Date	Opponent	Score	OT	Decision	Location	Attendance	Record	Points	Box Score/Recap
1	November 23	@ Boston	0–2		Desbiens	Tsongas Center	5,166	0–0–0–1	0	
2	November 25	New York	4–0		Desbiens	Place Bell	8,391	1–0–0–1	3	

December: 2–1–0–2, 8 points (Home: 1–0–0–1; Road: 1–1–0–1)

Game	Date	Opponent	Score	OT	Decision	Location	Attendance	Record	Points	Box Score/Recap
3	December 7	Toronto	3–1		Desbiens	Place Bell	8,113	2–0–0–1	6	
4	December 17	@ Toronto	2–1	SO	Desbiens	Scotiabank Centre	10,438	2–1–0–1	8	
5	December 20	@ Vancouver	4–2		Abstreiter	Pacific Coliseum	12,127	3–1–0–1	11	
6	December 23	@ Seattle	1–2		Desbiens	Climate Pledge Arena	10,276	3–1–0–2	11	
7	December 27	Toronto	1–2		Desbiens	Bell Centre	18,107	3–1–0–3	11	

January: 4–2–0–2, 16 points (Home: 4–1–0–0; Road: 0–1–0–2)

Game	Date	Opponent	Score	OT	Decision	Location	Attendance	Record	Points	Box Score/Recap
8	January 2	@ New York	3–4		Abstreiter	Prudential Center	3,513	3–1–0–4	11	
9	January 4	Minnesota	3–2	OT	Desbiens	Place Bell	10,172	3–2–0–4	13	
10	January 11	Vancouver	1–0		Desbiens	Videotron Centre	14,624	4–2–0–4	16	
11	January 13	Ottawa	2–1		Desbiens	Place Bell	7,408	5–2–0–4	19	
12	January 18	@ New York	1–2		Desbiens	Capital One Arena	17,228	5–2–0–5	19	
13	January 21	@ Minnesota	2–1	OT	Desbiens	Grand Casino Arena	6,113	5–3–0–5	21	
14	January 24	Ottawa	3–1		Desbiens	Place Bell	10,172	6–3–0–5	24	
15	January 28	Toronto	3–0		Desbiens	Place Bell	8,018	7–3–0–5	27	

February: 1–0–0–0, 3 points (Home: 0–0–0–0; Road: 1–0–0–0)

Game	Date	Opponent	Score	OT	Decision	Location	Attendance	Record	Points	Box Score/Recap
16	February 26	@ New York	4–1		Desbiens	Prudential Center	3,488	8–3–0–5	30	

March: 4–1–2–0, 16 points (Home: 3–0–1–0; Road: 1–1–1–0)

Game	Date	Opponent	Score	OT	Decision	Location	Attendance	Record	Points	Box Score/Recap
17	March 1	Minnesota	4–0		Desbiens	Place Bell	10,172	9–3–0–5	33	
18	March 3	@ Toronto	4–3	SO	Abstreiter	Coca-Cola Coliseum	8,671	9–4–0–5	35	
19	March 15	Boston	3–4	OT	Desbiens	Place Bell	10,172	9–4–1–5	36	
20	March 19	Seattle	4–1		Desbiens	Place Bell	10,033	10–4–1–5	39	
21	March 22	@ Ottawa	1–2	OT	Desbiens	Canada Life Centre	15,225	10–4–2–5	40	
22	March 25	@ Minnesota	3–0		Desbiens	Grand Casino Arena	6,803	11–4–2–5	43	
23	March 28	New York	1–3		Desbiens	Little Caesars Arena	15,938	12–4–2–5	46	

April: 4–2–0–1, 16 points (Home: 2–1–0–0; Road: 2–1–0–1)

Game	Date	Opponent	Score	OT	Decision	Location	Attendance	Record	Points	Box Score/Recap
24	April 1	Vancouver	3–0		Desbiens	Place Bell	9,176	13–4–2–5	49	
25	April 3	@ Ottawa	3–0		Abstreiter	Canadian Tire Centre	17,114	14–4–2–5	52	
26	April 7	Seattle	4–1		Desbiens	Place Bell	9,247	15–4–2–5	55	
27	April 11	@ Boston	1–0		Desbiens	TD Garden	17,850	16–4–2–5	58	
28	April 17	Boston	3–2	OT	Desbiens	Place Bell	10,172	16–5–2–5	60	
29	April 21	@ Vancouver	3–4		Abstreiter	Pacific Coliseum	10,946	16–5–2–6	60	
30	April 25	@ Seattle	2–1	SO	Desbiens	Climate Pledge Arena	17,151	16–6–2–6	62	

Regulation Win (3 points) Overtime/Shootout win (2 points) Overtime/shootout loss (1 point) Regulation Loss (0 points)

=== Playoffs ===
Montreal clinched first place in the league on the last day of the regular season. On April 26, the Victoire announced that they chose to play the third-seeded Minnesota Frost in the first round.

2026 Walter Cup playoffs
Montreal vs. Minnesota Frost; Series 3–2

Game	Date	Opponent	Score	OT	Decision	Location	Attendance	Series	Recap
1	May 2	Minnesota	4–5	OT	Desbiens	Place Bell	9,364	0–1	
2	May 5	Minnesota	1–0	3OT	Desbiens	Place Bell	7,530	1–1	
3	May 7	@ Minnesota	2–1		Desbiens	Grand Casino Arena	6,516	2–1	
4	May 8	@ Minnesota	1–3		Desbiens	Grand Casino Arena	5,312	2–2	
5	May 11	Minnesota	2–1		Desbiens	Place Bell	6,104	3–2	

Montreal vs. Ottawa Charge; Series 3–1

Game	Date	Opponent	Score	OT	Decision	Location	Attendance	Series	Recap
1	May 14	Ottawa	3–2	OT	Desbiens	Place Bell	5,062	1–0	
2	May 16	Ottawa	2–1	OT	Desbiens	Place Bell	9,232	2–0	
3	May 18	@ Ottawa	1–2		Desbiens	Canadian Tire Centre	16,894	2–1	
4	May 20	@ Ottawa	4–0		Desbiens	Canadian Tire Centre	12,362	3–1	

== Player statistics ==
As of May 8, 2026

=== Skaters ===
Regular Season
Player	GP	G	A	Pts	SOG	+/−	PIM
Abby Roque	29	8	14	22	69	+10	31
Laura Stacey	30	7	15	22	113	+16	12
Nicole Gosling	30	3	16	19	55	+16	10
Marie-Philip Poulin	19	9	9	18	58	+5	20
Hayley Scamurra	30	8	8	16	64	+7	20
Kati Tabin	30	2	10	12	47	+10	12
Natálie Mlýnková	30	5	5	10	46	+5	6
Lina Ljungblom	21	4	5	9	31	+10	8
Maggie Flaherty	30	4	5	9	40	+5	35
Skylar Irving	27	3	6	9	33	+5	12
Shiann Darkangelo	30	4	4	8	58	–1	4
Maureen Murphy	21	4	3	7	50	+1	0
Kaitlin Willoughby	29	3	3	6	21	+2	4
Erin Ambrose	21	0	6	6	26	+9	2
Catherine Dubois	24	4	1	5	29	+7	6
Dara Greig	29	3	2	5	28	+6	20
Alexandra Labelle	28	0	4	4	25	+5	4
Jessica DiGirolamo	29	1	2	3	35	+3	10
Amanda Boulier	30	0	3	3	20	+5	8
Jade Downie-Landry	23	2	0	2	33	–1	6
Maya Labad	6	1	0	1	2	+1	4
Nadia Mattivi	6	0	0	0	1	0	2
Kelly-Ann Nadeau	6	0	0	0	1	–1	0
Tamara Giaquinto	12	0	0	0	8	+2	0

Playoffs
Player	GP	G	A	Pts	SOG	+/−	PIM
Laura Stacey	4	3	1	4	16	–2	4
Marie-Philip Poulin	4	1	2	3	12	–3	0
Hayley Scamurra	4	1	2	3	7	+2	0
Abby Roque	4	0	3	3	10	–3	4
Shiann Darkangelo	4	1	0	1	6	0	0
Maggie Flaherty	4	1	0	1	11	0	8
Maureen Murphy	4	1	0	1	8	–2	0
Erin Ambrose	4	0	1	1	5	–1	2
Nicole Gosling	4	0	1	1	12	0	4
Lina Ljungblom	4	0	1	1	3	+1	2
Kati Tabin	4	0	1	1	6	0	4
Skylar Irving	1	0	0	0	0	0	0
Jade Downie-Landry	3	0	0	0	0	0	0
Amanda Boulier	4	0	0	0	4	+1	6
Jessica DiGirolamo	4	0	0	0	3	–2	0
Catherine Dubois	4	0	0	0	3	0	4
Dara Greig	4	0	0	0	8	+2	2
Alexandra Labelle	4	0	0	0	5	–1	2
Natálie Mlýnková	4	0	0	0	2	0	0
Kaitlin Willoughby	4	0	0	0	5	+2	0

=== Goaltenders ===
Regular Season
Player	GP	TOI	W	L	OT	SOL	GA	GAA	SA	SV%	SO	G	A	PIM
Ann-Renée Desbiens	25	1509:26	19	4	2	0	28	1.11	620	0.955	7	0	1	0
Sandra Abstreiter	5	298:04	3	2	0	0	13	2.62	137	0.905	1	0	1	0

Playoffs
Player	GP	TOI	W	L	OT	SOL	GA	GAA	SA	SV%	SO	G	A	PIM
Ann-Renée Desbiens	4	286:56	2	1	1	0	8	1.67	125	0.936	1	0	0	0

== Awards and honours ==
=== Milestones ===
Regular season
Date	Player	Milestone
November 23, 2025	Nicole Gosling	1st career PWHL game
November 23, 2025	Natálie Mlýnková	1st career PWHL game
November 23, 2025	Skylar Irving	1st career PWHL game
November 23, 2025	Skylar Irving	1st career PWHL penalty
November 25, 2025	Natálie Mlýnková	1st career PWHL goal
November 25, 2025	Natálie Mlýnková	1st career game-winning goal
November 25, 2025	Marie-Philip Poulin	50th career PWHL point
November 25, 2025	Abby Roque	20th career PWHL assist
December 7, 2025	Skylar Irving	1st career PWHL assist
December 7, 2025	Natálie Mlýnková	1st career PWHL assist
December 17, 2025	Maya Labad	1st career PWHL goal
December 17, 2025	Maya Labad	1st career PWHL game
December 20, 2025	Shiann Darkangelo	10th career PWHL goal
December 20, 2025	Dara Greig	1st career PWHL goal
December 20, 2025	Maya Labad	1st career PWHL penalty
December 27, 2025	Abby Roque	15th career PWHL goal
December 27, 2025	Kaitlin Willoughby	5th career PWHL assist
January 2, 2026	Nicole Gosling	1st career PWHL assist
January 11, 2025	Nicole Gosling	1st career PWHL goal
January 18, 2026	Maggie Flaherty	5th career PWHL goal
January 18, 2026	Hayley Scamurra	10th career PWHL assist
January 24, 2026	Kati Tabin	15th career PWHL assist
January 28, 2026	Dara Greig	5th career PWHL assist
February 26, 2026	Skylar Irving	1st career PWHL goal
February 26, 2026	Nicole Gosling	5th career PWHL assist
March 1, 2026	Maureen Murphy	15th career PWHL goal
March 1, 2026	Marie-Philip Poulin	30th career PWHL assist
March 1, 2026	Amanda Boulier	15th career PWHL assist
March 3, 2026	Lina Ljungblom	5th career PWHL goal
March 3, 2026	Maggie Flaherty	10th career PWHL assist
March 15, 2026	Marie-Philip Poulin	40th career PWHL goal
March 19, 2026	Catherine Dubois	10th career PWHL goal
March 19, 2026	Laura Stacey	30th career PWHL assist
March 22, 2026	Abby Roque	30th career PWHL assist
March 25, 2026	Hayley Scamurra	10th career PWHL goal
March 28, 2026	Hayley Scamurra	15th career PWHL assist
March 28, 2026	Natálie Mlýnková	5th career PWHL assist
April 1, 2026	Skylar Irving	5th career PWHL assist
April 3, 2026	Kaitlin Willoughby	1st career PWHL goal
April 3, 2026	Nicole Gosling	10th career PWHL assist
April 3, 2026	Sandra Abstreiter	1st career PWHL assist
April 7, 2026	Natálie Mlýnková	5th career PWHL goal
April 7, 2026	Kati Tabin	20th career PWHL assist
April 7, 2026	Lina Ljungblom	5th career PWHL assist
April 7, 2026	Ann-Renée Desbiens	1st career PWHL assist
April 21, 2026	Hayley Scamurra	1st career PWHL hat-trick
April 21, 2026	Hayley Scamurra	15th career PWHL goal
April 21, 2026	Nicole Gosling	15th career PWHL assist
April 25, 2026	Abby Roque	20th career PWHL goal

Playoffs
Date	Player	Milestone
May 2, 2026	Laura Stacey	1st career PWHL playoff hat-trick
May 2, 2026	Nicole Gosling	1st career PWHL playoff assist
May 2, 2026	Lina Ljungblom	1st career PWHL playoff assist
May 2, 2026	Abby Roque	1st career PWHL playoff assist
May 7, 2026	Hayley Scamurra	1st career PWHL playoff assist

== Transactions ==
=== Draft ===
The 2025 PWHL Draft was held on June 24, 2025. Montreal made five draft picks, with Clarkson University forward and Canada women's national ice hockey team member Nicole Gosling as their first round pick at fourth overall. She was followed by Natálie Mlýnková at 12, Skylar Irving at 20, Maya Labad at 36, and Tamara Giaquinto at 44. They were originally assigned pick 28 but traded it to the New York Sirens.

Drafted prospect signings
Date	Player	Draft	Term	Ref
October 10, 2025	Nicole Gosling	First round, Fourth overall (2025)	Three years	
November 20, 2025	Natálie Mlýnková	Second round, 12th overall (2025)	One year	
November 20, 2025	Skylar Irving	Third round, 20th overall (2025)	One year	
November 20, 2025	Tamara Giaquinto	Sixth round, 44th overall (2025)	Reserve player contract	
November 20, 2025	Maya Labad	Fifth round, 36th overall (2025)	Reserve player contract	

=== Free agency ===
The free agency period began on June 16, 2025 at 9:00 am ET, with a pause between June 27 and July 8. Prior to the start of the free agency period, there was an exclusive signing window from June 4–8 for the Seattle and Vancouver expansion teams.

Free agent signings
Date	Player	Previous team	Term	Ref
June 17, 2025	Shiann Darkangelo	Ottawa Charge	Two years	
June 17, 2025	Hayley Scamurra	Toronto Sceptres	Two years	
June 19, 2025	Jessica DiGirolamo	Boston Fleet	Two years	
June 20, 2025	Maggie Flaherty	Minnesota Frost	One year	
June 20, 2025	Jade Downie-Landry	New York Sirens	One year	
November 20, 2025	Megan Warrener	University of Connecticut (HE)	One year	
November 20, 2025	Claire Vekich	Minnesota State University (WCHA)	Reserve player contract	
March 24, 2026	Nadia Mattivi	Luleå HF (SDHL)	End of Season	

=== Contract extensions/terminations ===
Player contract extensions
Date	Player	Term	Ref
June 16, 2025	Kati Tabin	Two years	
June 19, 2025	Sandra Abstreiter	One year	
June 19, 2025	Catherine Dubois	One year	
July 8, 2025	Kaitlin Willoughby	One year	
July 21, 2025	Alexandra Labelle	One year	
November 20, 2025	Kelly-Ann Nadeau	Reserve player contract (Note: Was a reserve player for the 2024–25 season. Signed a standard player agreement following training camp to fill in for Lina Ljungblom who is on LTIR. Length of contract has not been specified.)	

Player contract terminations
Date	Player	Term remaining	Ref
January 4, 2026	Claire Vekich	Reserve player contract	

=== Trades ===
Trades involving the Victoire
Date	Details		Ref
June 24, 2025	To New York Sirens Kristin O'Neill; Fourth round pick – 2025 PWHL Draft (#28 – Callie Shanahan)	To Montreal Victoire Abby Roque	

=== Reserve activations ===
Reserve player activations
Date	Activated player	Absent player	Notes	Ref
November 20, 2025	Kelly-Ann Nadeau	Lina Ljungblom	LTIR	
November 22, 2025	Maya Labad	Jade Downie-Landry	LTIR	
January 4, 2026	Tamara Giaquinto	Erin Ambrose	10 day contract	
