= 2025–26 Ottawa Charge season =

Professional Women's Hockey League season

2025–26 Ottawa Charge
- League: 4th PWHL
- 2025–26 record: 9–8–1–12
- Home record: 7–2–1–5
- Road record: 2–6–0–7
- Goals for: 71
- Goals against: 73

Team information
- General manager: Michael Hirshfeld
- Coach: Carla MacLeod
- Captain: Brianne Jenner
- Alternate captains: Emily Clark; Jocelyne Larocque
- Arena: TD Place Arena
- Average attendance: 8,131

Team leaders
- Goals: Rebecca Leslie (14)
- Assists: Brianne Jenner (14)
- Points: Brianne Jenner (26)
- Penalty minutes: Peyton Hemp (31)
- Plus/minus: Jocelyne Larocque; Sarah Wozniewicz (+7)
- Wins: Gwyneth Philips (16)
- Goals against average: Sanni Ahola (1.93)

The 2025–26 Ottawa Charge season was the team's third season as a member of the Professional Women's Hockey League. They played their regular season home games at TD Place Arena in Ottawa, Ontario and their playoff games at the Canadian Tire Centre in Kanata.

The dates and locations of the 2025–26 PWHL Takeover Tour were announced on November 10, 2025.

The team made it to the Walter Cup Finals for the second season, where they lost to the Montreal Victoire in four games.

== Offseason ==
=== Coaching changes ===
On August 29, 2025, the Charge announced the hiring of Juuso Toivola as an assistant coach. He previously served as head coach for the Finland women's national ice hockey team. Ottawa also announced the departure of assistant coach Dean Jackson.

== Schedule and results ==
=== Preseason ===
The preseason schedule was published on October 8, 2025.

Pre-season camp

Date	Opponent	Score	OT	Decision	Location	Box Score/Recap
November 16	Toronto	2–3	OT	Angers	TD Place Arena	
November 17	Toronto	0–3		Philips	TD Place Arena	

=== Standings ===
Pos	Team	Pld	W	OTW	OTL	L	GF	GA	GD	Pts	Qualification
1	Montreal Victoire (Y)	30	16	6	2	6	78	41	+37	62 (Note: Greater number of games won, excluding games won by Shootout: Montreal 19, Boston 18)	Playoffs
2	Boston Fleet	30	16	5	4	5	74	45	+29	62	Playoffs
3	Minnesota Frost	30	13	3	5	9	91	73	+18	50	Playoffs
4	Ottawa Charge	30	9	8	1	12	71	73	−2	44	Playoffs
5	Toronto Sceptres	30	10	1	6	13	51	72	−21	38	
6	Vancouver Goldeneyes	30	9	3	4	14	68	81	−13	37	
7	New York Sirens	30	9	3	3	15	63	83	−20	36	
8	Seattle Torrent	30	8	1	5	16	64	92	−28	31	

Updated to match(es) played on April 25, 2026. Source: PWHL
(Y) Regular season winner

=== Regular season ===
The regular season schedule was published on October 1, 2025.

Regular season schedule (Home: 7–2–1–5; Road: 2–6–0–7)
November: 1–0–0–1, 3 points (Home: 1–0–0–1; Road: 0–0–0–0)

Game	Date	Opponent	Score	OT	Decision	Location	Attendance	Record	Points	Box Score/Recap
1	November 22	New York	0–4		Philips	TD Place Arena	7,371	0–0–0–1	0	
2	November 26	Vancouver	5–1		Philips	TD Place Arena	5,507	1–0–0–1	3	

December: 0–3–0–4, 6 points (Home: 0–1–0–1; Road: 0–2–0–3)

Game	Date	Opponent	Score	OT	Decision	Location	Attendance	Record	Points	Box Score/Recap
3	December 2	Minnesota	1–5		Philips	TD Place Arena	5,174	1–0–0–2	3	
4	December 4	@ Toronto	1–3		Philips	Coca-Cola Coliseum	7,715	1–0–0–3	3	
5	December 16	@ Vancouver	1–2		Philips	Pacific Coliseum	9,250	1–0–0–4	3	
6	December 17	@ Seattle	1–4		Ahola	Climate Pledge Arena	9,389	1–0–0–5	3	
7	December 21	@ Minnesota	3–2	OT	Philips	Allstate Arena	7,238	1–1–0–5	5	
8	December 23	@ Toronto	4–3	OT	Philips	Coca-Cola Coliseum	8,108	1–2–0–5	7	
9	December 27	Boston	3–2	SO	Philips	TD Place Arena	8,497	1–3–0–5	9	

January: 3–2–0–2, 13 points (Home: 3–0–0–0; Road: 0–2–0–2)

Game	Date	Opponent	Score	OT	Decision	Location	Attendance	Record	Points	Box Score/Recap
10	January 3	Minnesota	5–2		Philips	TD Place Arena	8,235	2–3–0–5	12	
11	January 9	Vancouver	4–2		Philips	TD Place Arena	7,889	3–3–0–5	15	
12	January 11	@ Boston	2–1	SO	Ahola	Scotiabank Centre	10,452	3–4–0–5	17	
13	January 13	@ Montreal	1–2		Philips	Place Bell	7,408	3–4–0–6	17	
14	January 20	@ New York	4–3	OT	Philips	Prudential Center	2,759	3–5–0–6	19	
15	January 24	@ Montreal	1–3		Philips	Place Bell	10,172	3–5–0–7	19	
16	January 28	Seattle	4–2		Philips	TD Place Arena	6,787	4–5–0–7	22	

February: 0–0–1–0, 1 point (Home: 0–0–1–0; Road: 0–0–0–0)

Game	Date	Opponent	Score	OT	Decision	Location	Attendance	Record	Points	Box Score/Recap
17	February 28	Boston	1–2	SO	Philips	TD Place Arena	8,572	4–5–1–7	23	

March: 2–2–0–2, 10 points (Home: 1–1–0–0; Road: 1–1–0–2)

Game	Date	Opponent	Score	OT	Decision	Location	Attendance	Record	Points	Box Score/Recap
18	March 4	Seattle	4–3		Philips	TD Place Arena	6,997	5–5–1–7	26	
19	March 8	@ New York	2–6		Philips	Prudential Center	8,264	5–5–1–8	26	
20	March 14	@ Vancouver	3–2	SO	Philips	Pacific Coliseum	11,201	5–6–1–8	28	
21	March 18	@ Minnesota	0–5		Philips	Grand Casino Arena	6,673	5–6–1–9	28	
22	March 22	Montreal	2–1	OT	Philips	Canada Life Centre	15,225	5–7–1–9	30	
23	March 29	@ Seattle	2–0		Philips	Climate Pledge Arena	16,586	6–7–1–9	33	

April: 3–1–0–3, 11 points (Home: 2–0–0–3; Road: 1–1–0–0)

Game	Date	Opponent	Score	OT	Decision	Location	Attendance	Record	Points	Box Score/Recap
24	April 1	Toronto	1–2		Philips	Scotiabank Saddledome	16,150	6–7–1–10	33	
25	April 3	Montreal	0–3		Philips	Canadian Tire Centre	17,114	6–7–1–11	33	
26	April 8	Seattle	3–5		Philips	TD Place Arena	6,644	6–7–1–12	33	
27	April 11	@ Toronto	2–0		Philips	Coca-Cola Coliseum	8,716	7–7–1–12	36	
28	April 18	New York	5–1		Philips	TD Place Arena	8,605	8–7–1–12	39	
29	April 22	@ Boston	2–1	OT	Philips	Tsongas Center	5,215	8–8–1–12	41	
30	April 25	Toronto	3–0		Philips	TD Place Arena	8,306	9–8–1–12	44	

Regulation Win (3 points) Overtime/Shootout win (2 points) Overtime/shootout loss (1 point) Regulation Loss (0 points)

=== Playoffs ===
Ottawa clinched a playoff berth in their last regular season game against Toronto, after winning 3–0. On the same day, it was announced that the Charge would play all of their home games at the Canadian Tire Centre in Kanata.

2026 Walter Cup playoffs
First round vs. Boston Fleet; Ottawa won 3–1

Game	Date	Opponent	Score	OT	Decision	Location	Attendance	Series	Recap
1	April 30	@ Boston	1–2		Philips	Tsongas Center	4,285	0–1	
2	May 2	@ Boston	3–1		Philips	Tsongas Center	6,017	1–1	
3	May 8	Boston	2–1		Philips	Canadian Tire Centre	13,112	2–1	
4	May 10	Boston	4–3	2OT	Philips	Canadian Tire Centre	11,297	3–1	

2026 Walter Cup Finals vs. Montreal Victoire; Montreal won 3–1

Game	Date	Opponent	Score	OT	Decision	Location	Attendance	Series	Recap
1	May 14	@ Montreal	2–3	OT	Philips	Place Bell	5,062	0–1	
2	May 16	@ Montreal	1–2	OT	Philips	Place Bell	9,232	0–2	
3	May 18	Montreal	2–1		Philips	Canadian Tire Centre	16,894	1–2	
4	May 20	Montreal	0–4		Philips	Canadian Tire Centre	12,362	1–3	

== Player statistics ==
As of May 10, 2026

=== Skaters ===
Regular Season
Player	GP	G	A	Pts	SOG	+/−	PIM
Brianne Jenner	30	12	14	26	80	+2	8
Rebecca Leslie	30	14	9	23	99	+2	10
Gabbie Hughes	28	5	11	16	40	–6	16
Sarah Wozniewicz	30	7	6	13	69	+7	8
Fanuza Kadirova	28	10	2	12	48	0	14
Ronja Savolainen	30	4	6	10	55	–4	10
Emily Clark	30	3	6	9	77	–6	4
Peyton Hemp	30	2	7	9	45	+3	31
Kateřina Mrázová	30	2	7	9	31	–3	8
Rory Guilday	30	1	8	9	34	–5	18
Jocelyne Larocque	30	1	7	8	29	+7	18
Stephanie Markowski	30	1	4	5	31	+6	6
Brooke Hobson	23	1	3	4	18	–4	8
Michela Cava	17	0	4	4	24	+3	6
Kate Reilly	25	0	4	4	13	+5	16
Alexa Vasko	30	2	1	3	25	–3	10
Emma Greco	17	0	2	2	13	–2	6
Brooke McQuigge	17	0	1	1	7	–2	4
Olivia Wallin	2	0	0	0	0	0	0
Vita Poniatovskaia	7	0	0	0	2	–1	2
Taylor House	29	0	0	0	8	–6	8

Playoffs
Player	GP	G	A	Pts	SOG	+/−	PIM
Fanuza Kadirova	4	2	3	5	9	+4	2
Jocelyne Larocque	4	1	3	4	4	+2	2
Ronja Savolainen	4	2	1	3	6	+1	2
Michela Cava	4	1	2	3	6	+2	0
Rebecca Leslie	4	1	2	3	9	0	0
Rory Guilday	4	0	2	2	6	0	6
Kateřina Mrázová	4	0	2	2	4	+3	0
Brooke Hobson	4	1	0	1	3	–1	2
Gabbie Hughes	4	1	0	1	9	–1	4
Sarah Wozniewicz	4	1	0	1	4	–1	2
Taylor House	4	0	1	1	1	+1	0
Brianne Jenner	4	0	1	1	10	–1	6
Emily Clark	4	0	0	0	10	–1	2
Emma Greco	4	0	0	0	0	0	0
Peyton Hemp	4	0	0	0	8	–1	2
Stephanie Markowski	4	0	0	0	1	0	0
Brooke McQuigge	4	0	0	0	1	+1	0
Kate Reilly	4	0	0	0	3	+1	2
Alexa Vasko	4	0	0	0	0	+1	0

=== Goaltenders ===
Regular Season
Player	GP	TOI	W	L	OT	SOL	GA	GAA	SA	SV%	SO	G	A	PIM
Gwyneth Philips	28	1643:15	16	11	0	1	58	2.12	844	0.931	3	0	0	2
Sanni Ahola	2	124:37	1	1	0	0	4	1.93	55	0.927	0	0	0	0
Kendra Woodland	1	45:10	0	0	0	0	2	2.66	16	0.875	0	0	0	0

Playoffs
Player	GP	TOI	W	L	OT	SOL	GA	GAA	SA	SV%	SO	G	A	PIM
Gwyneth Philips	4	259:46	3	1	0	0	7	1.62	142	0.951	0	0	1	2

== Awards and honours ==
=== Milestones ===
Regular season
Date	Player	Milestone
November 22, 2025	Rory Guilday	1st career PWHL game
November 22, 2025	Peyton Hemp	1st career PWHL game
November 22, 2025	Fanuza Kadirova	1st career PWHL game
November 22, 2025	Sarah Wozniewicz	1st career PWHL game
November 26, 2025	Brianne Jenner	20th career PWHL goal
November 26, 2025	Rory Guilday	1st career PWHL assist
November 26, 2025	Stephanie Markowski	5th career PWHL assist
November 26, 2025	Peyton Hemp	1st career PWHL penalty
November 26, 2025	Anna Shokhina	1st career PWHL penalty
November 26, 2025	Anna Shokhina	1st career PWHL game
November 26, 2025	Kate Reilly	1st career PWHL game
December 2, 2025	Rory Guilday	1st career PWHL goal
December 2, 2025	Rory Guilday	1st career PWHL penalty
December 2, 2025	Gabbie Hughes	20th career PWHL assist
December 4, 2025	Fanuza Kadirova	1st career PWHL goal
December 4, 2025	Samantha Isbell	1st career PWHL assist
December 4, 2025	Anna Shokhina	1st career PWHL assist
December 4, 2025	Sarah Wozniewicz	1st career PWHL penalty
December 16, 2025	Anna Shokhina	1st career PWHL goal
December 16, 2025	Peyton Hemp	1st career PWHL assist
December 17, 2025	Sanni Ahola	1st career PWHL loss
December 17, 2025	Sanni Ahola	1st career PWHL game
December 21, 2025	Sarah Wozniewicz	1st career PWHL goal
December 23, 2025	Gabbie Hughes	15th career PWHL goal
December 23, 2025	Rebecca Leslie	10th career PWHL goal
December 23, 2025	Rory Guilday	5th career PWHL assist
December 27, 2025	Fanuza Kadirova	1st career PWHL assist
January 3, 2026	Kateřina Mrázová	10th career PWHL goal
January 3, 2026	Sarah Wozniewicz	1st career PWHL assist
January 11, 2026	Brianne Jenner	25th career PWHL goal
January 11, 2026	Kate Reilly	1st career PWHL penalty
January 11, 2026	Sanni Ahola	1st career PWHL win
January 13, 2026	Ronja Savolainen	5th career PWHL goal
January 13, 2026	Fanuza Kadirova	1st career PWHL penalty
January 28, 2026	Kateřina Mrázová	20th career PWHL assist
February 28, 2026	Rebecca Leslie	15th career PWHL goal
March 4, 2026	Alexa Vasko	5th career PWHL goal
March 4, 2026	Fanuza Kadirova	5th career PWHL goal
March 4, 2026	Peyton Hemp	5th career PWHL assist
March 4, 2026	Kate Reilly	1st career PWHL assist
March 8, 2026	Brooke Hobson	10th career PWHL assist
March 8, 2026	Brooke McQuigge	10th career PWHL assist
March 8, 2026	Emma Greco	5th career PWHL assist
March 14, 2026	Sarah Wozniewicz	5th career PWHL assist
March 22, 2026	Brianne Jenner	30th career PWHL assist
March 22, 2026	Ronja Savolainen	15th career PWHL assist
March 29, 2026	Sarah Wozniewicz	5th career PWHL goal
March 29, 2026	Peyton Hemp	1st career PWHL goal
March 29, 2026	Vita Poniatovskaia	1st career PWHL game
April 11, 2026	Vita Poniatovskaia	1st career PWHL penalty
April 22, 2026	Brianne Jenner	30th career PWHL goal
April 22, 2026	Rebecca Leslie	20th career PWHL goal
April 25, 2026	Fanuza Kadirova	10th career PWHL goal

Playoffs
Date	Player	Milestone
April 30, 2026	Rory Guilday	1st career PWHL playoff assist
April 30, 2026	Rebecca Leslie	20th career PWHL assist
May 2, 2026	Fanuza Kadirova	1st career PWHL playoff goal
May 2, 2026	Ronja Savolainen	1st career PWHL playoff goal
May 2, 2026	Gabbie Hughes	1st career PWHL playoff goal
May 2, 2026	Gabbie Hughes	20th career PWHL goal
May 2, 2026	Rory Guilday	10th career PWHL assist
May 2, 2026	Jocelyne Larocque	5th career PWHL playoff assist
May 2, 2026	Taylor House	1st career PWHL playoff assist
May 8, 2026	Kateřina Mrázová	1st career PWHL playoff assist
May 8, 2026	Fanuza Kadirova	1st career PWHL playoff assist
May 10, 2026	Brooke Hobson	1st career PWHL playoff goal
May 10, 2026	Sarah Wozniewicz	1st career PWHL playoff goal
May 10, 2026	Jocelyne Larocque	30th career PWHL assist
May 10, 2026	Fanuza Kadirova	5th career PWHL assist
May 10, 2026	Gwyneth Philips	1st career PWHL playoff assist
May 10, 2026	Gwyneth Philips	1st career PWHL assist

=== Three Star Awards ===
==== Player of the Week ====
Player of the Week recipients
Week	Player
December 1, 2025	Brianne Jenner
January 12, 2026	Brianne Jenner

==== Starting Six ====
The Starting Six is voted on each month by the Women's Chapter of the Professional Hockey Writers' Association (PHWA) and PWHL broadcast personnel. The following are Ottawa Charge players who have been named to the Starting Six.

Starting Six players
Month	Position	Player
November	F	Brianne Jenner

== Transactions ==
=== Draft ===
The 2025 PWHL Draft was held on June 24, 2025, with Ottawa as the host city. The Charge made six draft picks, with Cornell University forward and United States women's national ice hockey team member Rory Guilday as their first round pick at fifth overall. She was followed by Anna Shokhina at 13, Sarah Wozniewicz at 21, Peyton Hemp at 29, Sanni Ahola at 37, and Fanuza Kadirova at 45.

Drafted prospect signings
Date	Player	Draft	Term	Ref
July 11, 2025	Sarah Wozniewicz	Third round, 21st overall (2025)	One year	
July 14, 2025	Anna Shokhina	Second round, 13th overall (2025)	One year	
July 14, 2025	Sanni Ahola	Fifth round, 37th overall (2025)	One year	
July 14, 2025	Fanuza Kadirova	Sixth round, 45th overall (2025)	One year	
July 25, 2025	Rory Guilday	First round, fifth overall (2025)	Three years	
November 20, 2025	Peyton Hemp	Fourth round, 29th overall (2025)	One year	
November 20, 2025	Olivia Wallin	Sixth round, 47th overall (2025)	Reserve player contract	

=== Free agency ===
The free agency period began on June 16, 2025, at 9:00 am ET, with a pause between June 27 and July 8. Prior to the start of the free agency period, there was an exclusive signing window from June 4–8 for the Seattle and Vancouver expansion teams.

Free agent signings
Date	Player	Previous team	Term	Ref
June 19, 2025	Élizabeth Giguère	New York Sirens	One year	
June 20, 2025	Brooke Hobson	New York Sirens	One year	
June 21, 2025	Emma Bergesen	SDE Hockey (SDHL)	One year	
November 20, 2025	Kathryn Reilly	Quinnipiac University (ECAC)	One year	
November 20, 2025	Kendra Woodland	University of New Brunswick (U Sports)	One year	
November 20, 2025	Vita Poniatovskaia	Yale University (ECAC)	Reserve player contract	
November 24, 2025	Reece Hunt	Luleå HF (SDHL)	Reserve player contract	
January 6, 2026	Sarah Coe	Rochester Institute of Technology (AHA)	Reserve player contract	
February 3, 2026	Maggy Burbidge	HC Fribourg-Gottéron Ladies (SWHL A)	Reserve player contract	

=== Contract extensions/terminations ===
Player contract extensions
Date	Player	Term	Ref
June 18, 2025	Rebecca Leslie	Two years	
June 18, 2025	Taylor House	One year	
July 10, 2025	Anna Meixner	One year	
July 10, 2025	Samantha Isbell	One year	
July 10, 2025	Logan Angers	One year	
July 10, 2025	Jessica Adolfsson	One year	
July 11, 2025	Stephanie Markowski	One year	
July 24, 2025	Mannon McMahon	One year	
July 27, 2025	Gwyneth Philips	Two years (Note: Extension will come into effect for the 2026–27 season.)	
August 7, 2025	Emily Clark	Two years	
November 20, 2025	Alexa Vasko	One year	
November 25, 2025	Gabbie Hughes	One year	
November 25, 2025	Ronja Savolainen	One year (Note: Extension will come into effect for the 2027–28 season.)	

Player contract terminations
Date	Player	Term remaining	Ref
November 19, 2025	Élizabeth Giguère	One year (Note: Released from preseason/training camp.)	
November 19, 2025	Emma Bergesen	One year	
November 19, 2025	Jessica Adolfsson	One year	
November 19, 2025	Logan Angers	One year	
January 9, 2026	Sarah Coe	Reserve player contract	
January 30, 2026	Samantha Isbell	<One year	

=== Trades ===
Trades involving the Charge
Date	Details		Ref.
January 18, 2026	To Ottawa Charge Michela Cava; Brooke McQuigge; Emma Greco	To Vancouver Goldeneyes Mannon McMahon; Anna Meixner; Anna Shokhina	

=== Retirements ===
Player retirements
Date	Player	Team(s)	Ref
June 1, 2025	Victoria Bach	Toronto Sceptres (2024), Ottawa Charge (2024–25)	

=== Reserve activations ===
Reserve player activations
Date	Activated player	Absent player	Notes	Ref
December 15, 2025	Olivia Wallin	Gabbie Hughes	10 day contract	
January 6, 2026	Sarah Coe	Sanni Ahola	LTIR	
January 30, 2026	Olivia Wallin	Samantha Isbell	Contract termination	
