= Logan Angers =

Canadian ice hockey player (born 2000)

- Born: January 7, 2000 (age 26) Winnipeg, Manitoba, Canada
- Height: 6 ft 0 in (183 cm)
- Position: Goaltender
- Catches: Right
- PWHL team: Ottawa Charge
- Playing career: 2024–present

Logan Angers (born January 7, 2000) is a Canadian ice hockey goaltender for the Ottawa Charge of the Professional Women's Hockey League (PWHL).

== Early life ==
Angers was born on January 7, 2000, in Winnipeg, Manitoba. She started playing goaltender at age 11, after seeing her older brother play the position.

== Playing career ==
=== Collegiate ===
Angers attended Quinnipiac University from 2018 through 2024, and was a goaltender for the Quinnipiac Bobcats women's ice hockey team, starting as a redshirt freshman in 2018. She was also a member of the Bobcats softball team, playing first base, which she credits with influencing her playing style as a goaltender. She played 99 games as goalie for the Bobcats, with a career 1.79 goals against average and .929 save percentage.

=== Professional ===
Angers was not selected in the 2024 PWHL Draft. On June 25, 2024, the Ottawa Charge announced they had signed Angers to a one-year contract, to play goalie alongside Emerance Maschmeyer. Angers did not appear in any games during the 2024–25 season. On July 10, 2025, she signed a one-year contract extension with the Charge.
