= Kate Reilly =

Canadian ice hockey player (born 2001)

- Born: January 17, 2001 (age 25) Richmond, British Columbia, Canada
- Height: 5 ft 7 in (170 cm)
- Position: Defence
- Shoots: Right
- PWHL team: Ottawa Charge
- Playing career: 2019–present

Kathryn Reilly (born January 17, 2001) is a Canadian professional ice hockey defender for the Ottawa Charge of the Professional Women's Hockey League (PWHL). She played college ice hockey at Quinnipiac.

== Playing career ==
=== College ===
Reilly began her collegiate hockey career for Quinnipiac during the 2019–20 season. During her freshman year, she recorded six goals and 11 assists in 37 games, and ranked second on the team with 51 blocked shots. During the 2020–21 season in her sophomore year, she recorded three goals and five assists in 16 games, in a season that was shortened due to the COVID-19 pandemic. During the 2021–22 season in her junior year, she recorded four goals and 11 assists in 31 games. She missed the final eight games of the season due to injury. During the 2022–23 season in her senior year, she recorded eight goals and 11 assists in 40 games. During the 2023–24 season as a graduate student, she recorded a career-high ten goals and 29 assists in 37 games. She led all ECAC defenders in points with 39, and was named ECAC Al-Third team. She finished her collegiate career with 98 points in 161 games, and is the program's all-time leader for points by a defender.

=== Professional ===
After going undrafted in the 2025 PWHL Draft, she was invited to the Ottawa Charge's training camp in July 2025. On November 20, 2025, she signed a one-year contract with the Charge.

== Career statistics ==
			Regular season					Playoffs
Season	Team	League	GP	G	A	Pts	PIM	GP	G	A	Pts	PIM
2019–20	Quinnipiac University	ECAC	37	6	11	17	22	—	—	—	—	—
2020–21	Quinnipiac University	ECAC	16	3	5	8	22	—	—	—	—	—
2021–22	Quinnipiac University	ECAC	31	4	11	15	24	—	—	—	—	—
2022–23	Quinnipiac University	ECAC	40	8	11	19	12	—	—	—	—	—
2023–24	Quinnipiac University	ECAC	37	10	29	39	18	—	—	—	—	—
2025–26	Ottawa Charge	PWHL	25	0	4	4	16	8	0	0	0	2
NCAA totals			161	31	66	97	98	—	—	—	—	—
