= Megan Warrener =

Canadian ice hockey player (born 2003)

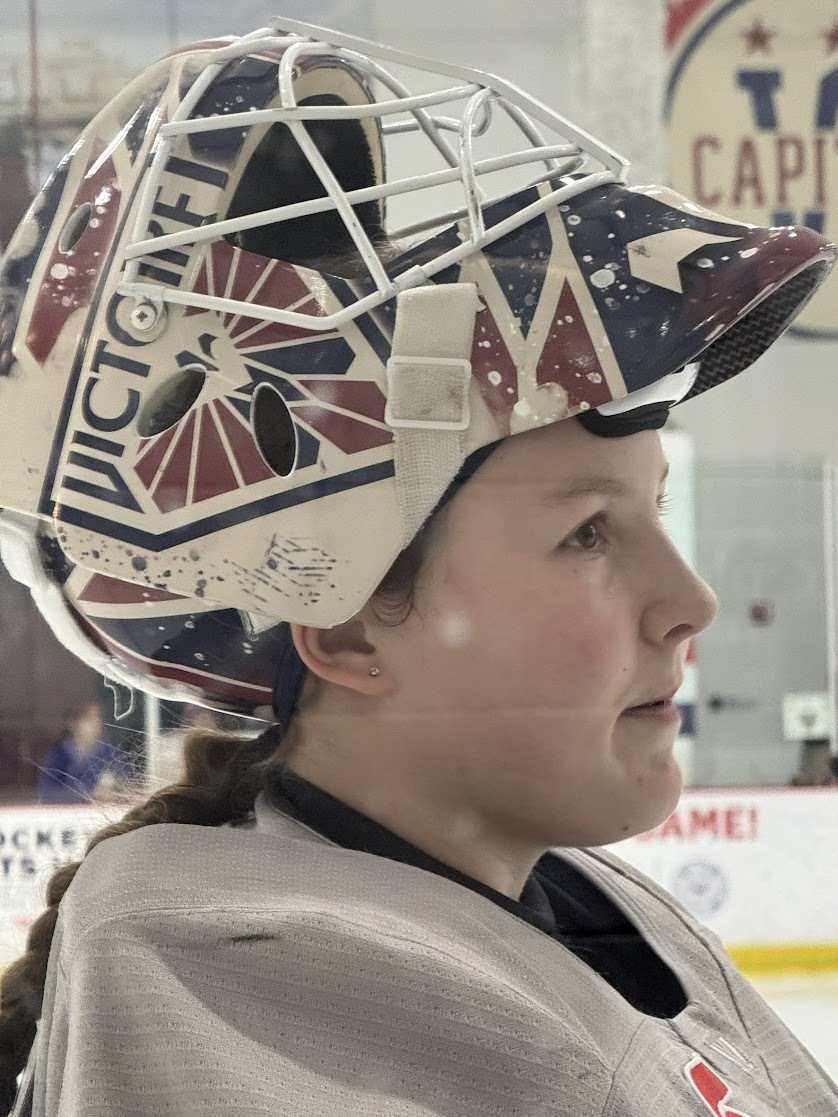
- Warrener with the Montreal Victoire in 2026
- Born: March 7, 2003 (age 23) Stoney Creek, Ontario, Canada
- Height: 5 ft 7 in (170 cm)
- Position: Goaltender
- Catches: Left
- PWHL team: Montreal Victoire
- Playing career: 2021–present

Megan Warrener (born March 7, 2003) is a Canadian professional ice hockey goaltender for the Montreal Victoire of the Professional Women's Hockey League (PWHL). She played college ice hockey at Connecticut.

== Early life ==
Warrener was born to Lisa and Scott Warrener. She played with the Stoney Creek Sabres of the Provincial Women's Hockey League. During the 2019–20 season she appeared in 20 games, and posted a 13–3–1 record, with a 1.56 goals against average (GAA), a .924 save percentage, and five shutouts.

== Playing career ==
=== College ===
Warrener began her collegiate career for Connecticut during the 2021–22 season. During her freshman year, she appeared in 18 games, with 15 starts, and posted a 12–3–1 record, with a 1.29 GAA, a .944 save percentage, and five shutouts. She set single-season program records for single GAA and save percentage. During the 2022–23 season, in her sophomore year, she started nine games and posted a 6–3–0 record, with a 1.91 GAA and .914 save percentage.

During the 2023–24 season, in her junior year, she appeared in 15 games and posted a 12–1–1 record, with a 1.01 GAA and .951 save percentage. She set new single-season records in GAA and save percentage. Following the season she was named a semifinalist for the WHCA National Goalie of the Year. During the 2024–25 season, in her senior year, she appeared in 12 games and posted an 8–4–0 record, with a 1.60 GAA and .933 save percentage. She finished her career at Connecticut with a 38–10–2 record, 13 shutouts, a .940 save percentage and 1.36 GAA.

=== Professional ===
After going undrafted in the 2025 PWHL Draft, Warrener signed a one-year contract with the Montreal Victoire on November 20, 2025.

== Career statistics ==
Season	Team	League	GP	W	L	T	MIN	GA	SO	GAA	SV%
2021–22	University of Connecticut	HE	18	12	3	1	981	21	5	1.29	.944
2022–23	University of Connecticut	HE	10	6	3	0	535	17	2	1.91	.916
2023–24	University of Connecticut	HE	15	12	1	1	834	14	4	1.01	.951
2024–25	University of Connecticut	HE	12	8	4	0	713	19	2	1.60	.933
NCAA totals			56	38	10	2	3,063	71	13	1.36	.940

== Awards and honours ==
Honours	Year
PWHL
Walter Cup champion	2026
