= Lauren Bernard =

American ice hockey player (born 2001)

- Born: July 15, 2001 (age 25) Madison, Ohio, U.S.
- Height: 5 ft 7 in (170 cm)
- Position: Defense
- Shoots: Left
- PWHL team Former teams: New York Sirens; Toronto Sceptres
- Playing career: 2024–present

Lauren Bernard (born July 15, 2001) is an American professional ice hockey player who is a defender for the New York Sirens of the Professional Women's Hockey League (PWHL). She previously played for the Toronto Sceptres of the PWHL. She played college ice hockey at Clarkson and Ohio State.

== Early life ==
Bernard attended Madison High School her first three years, before graduating from Bishop Kearney High School. She played ice hockey, softball and tennis in high school.

== Playing career ==
=== College ===
Bernard began her collegiate career for Clarkson during the 2019–20 season. During her freshman year, she recorded two goals and 11 assists in 37 games, and ranked third on the team with 65 blocked shots. During the 2020–21 season in her sophomore year, she recorded one goal and three assists in 19 games, in a season that was shortened due to the COVID-19 pandemic.

On April 27, 2021, Bernard transferred to Ohio State. During the 2021–22 season in her junior year, she recorded four goals and 20 assists in 38 games, and helped lead the Buckeyes to their first NCAA women's ice hockey tournament championship in 2022. During the 2022–23 season in her senior year, she recorded three goals and 12 assists in 41 games. During the 2023–24 season as a graduate student, she recorded eight goals and 15 assists in 39 games, and helped lead the Buckeyes to their second NCAA tournament championship in 2024.

=== Professional ===
On June 10, 2024, Bernard was drafted in the fourth round, 24th overall, by PWHL Toronto in the 2024 PWHL Draft. In November 2024, following pre-season camps, she signed a one-year contract with Toronto . Bernard began the 2024–25 season with the Sceptres, and recorded one assist in fifteen games. On March 10, 2025, she signed with the New York Sirens for the remainder of the 2024–25 season. She made her debut for the Sirens on March 16, 2025, and recorded two assists. On June 20, 2025, she signed a one-year contract extension with the Sirens. During the 2025–26 season, she recorded two assists in 30 games. On June 20, 2026, she signed a two-year contract extension with the Sirens.

== International play ==
Medal record

Representing United States

Ice hockey

World U18 Championships
Silver medal – second place	2019 Japan	

Bernard represented the United States at the 2019 IIHF World Women's U18 Championship where she recorded one assist in five games and won a silver medal.

== Personal life ==
Bernard was born to Chris and Donna Bernard, and has a brother Andrew.

== Career statistics ==
=== Regular season and playoffs ===
			Regular season					Playoffs
Season	Team	League	GP	G	A	Pts	PIM	GP	G	A	Pts	PIM
2019–20	Clarkson University	ECAC	37	2	11	13	12	—	—	—	—	—
2020–21	Clarkson University	ECAC	19	1	3	4	4	—	—	—	—	—
2021–22	Ohio State University	WCHA	38	4	20	24	2	—	—	—	—	—
2022–23	Ohio State University	WCHA	41	3	12	15	12	—	—	—	—	—
2023–24	Ohio State University	WCHA	39	8	15	23	2	—	—	—	—	—
2024–25	Toronto Sceptres	PWHL	15	0	1	1	2	—	—	—	—	—
2024–25	New York Sirens	PWHL	8	0	2	2	0	—	—	—	—	—
2025–26	New York Sirens	PWHL	30	0	2	2	2	—	—	—	—	—
PWHL totals			53	0	5	5	4	—	—	—	—	—

=== International ===
Year	Team	Event	Result	GP	G	A	Pts	PIM
2019	United States	U18	2nd place, silver medalist(s)	5	0	1	1	0
Junior totals				5	0	1	1	0
