= Jessie Eldridge =

Canadian ice hockey player (born 1997)

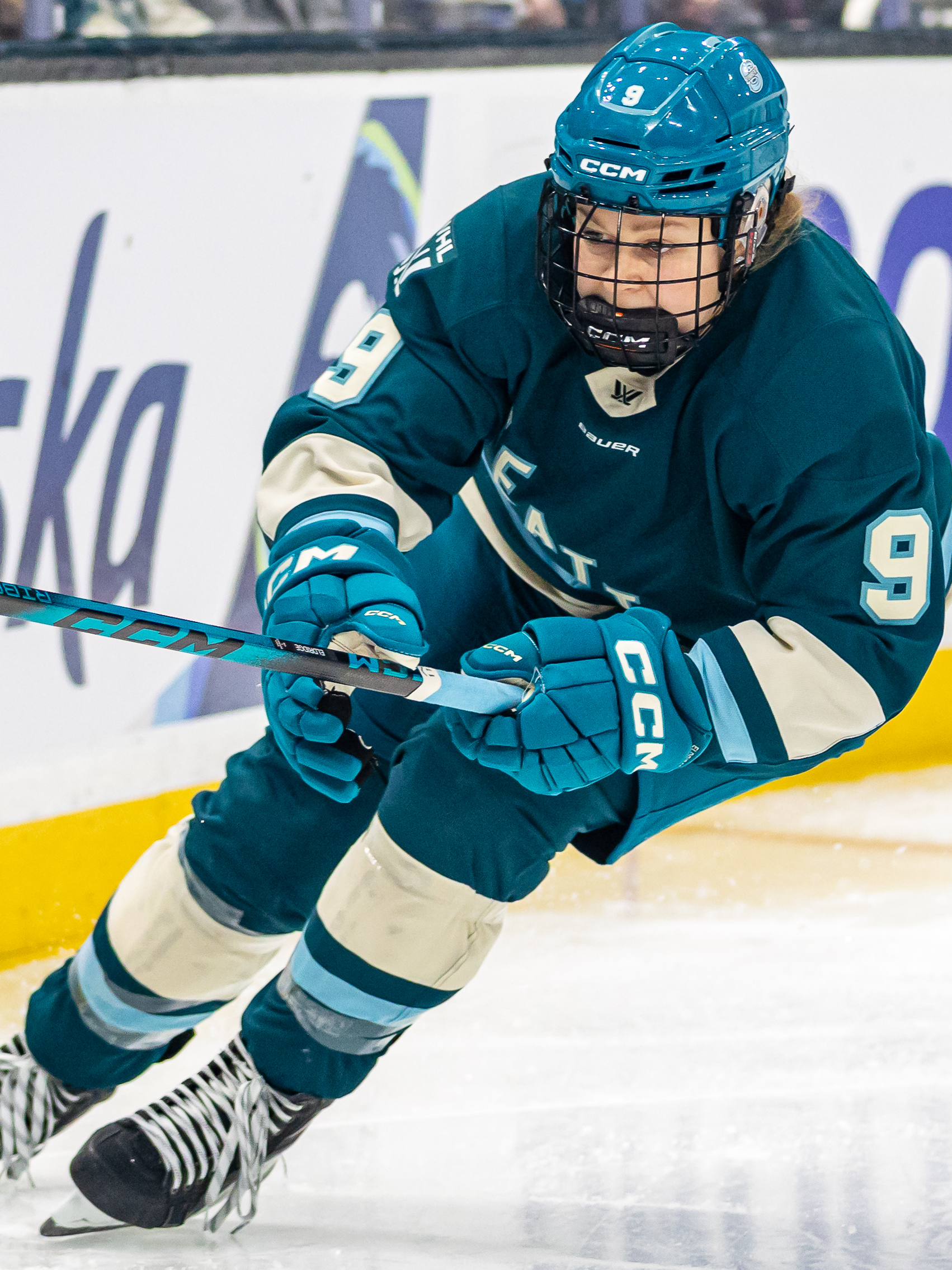
- Eldridge with the Seattle Torrent in 2025
- Born: December 17, 1997 (age 28) Barrie, Ontario, Canada
- Height: 5 ft 9 in (175 cm)
- Weight: 170 lb (77 kg; 12 st 2 lb)
- Position: Forward
- Shoots: Right
- PWHL team Former teams: Montreal Victoire; New York Sirens; Seattle Torrent; Boston Fleet
- National team: Canada
- Playing career: 2020–present
Medal record
World Championships
Gold medal – first place	2022 Denmark
Silver medal – second place	2026 Denmark

Jessica Eldridge (born December 17, 1997) is a Canadian ice hockey player who is a forward for the Montreal Victoire of the Professional Women's Hockey League (PWHL) and member of the Canadian national team. She previously played for the New York Sirens, the Seattle Torrent and the Boston Fleet.

A prolific scorer at Colgate University, Eldridge became the program's all-time leading scorer with 163 points (74 goals, 89 assists) in 153 games from 2015 to 2019. She holds or shares ten program records and was a three-time team Offensive MVP. In her senior season (2018–19), she set a Colgate single-season record with 30 goals and finished fifth nationally with 54 points, earning her selection as a top-10 finalist for the Patty Kazmaier Award—the first in program history. She helped lead the Raiders to their first NCAA Championship game appearance in 2018.

Internationally, Eldridge won a gold medal with Canada at the 2022 IIHF Women's World Championship, and a silver medal at the 2026 IIHF Women's World Championship.

Off the ice, Eldridge is an active mentor for young female hockey players in her hometown of Barrie, Ontario, regularly working with the Barrie Sharks organization. She was inducted into the Barrie Sports Hall of Fame in October 2025.

== Early life ==
Eldridge was born in Barrie, Ontario, on December 17, 1997. She is the daughter of Lisa and Duane Eldridge and has a brother, Kyle. Her father Duane coached her in the Barrie Sharks women's hockey organization.

Growing up in Barrie, Eldridge initially played hockey against boys because there was no girls' hockey organization at the time. She later played with the Barrie Sharks organization before moving to Toronto to play for the Toronto Junior Aeros. Eldridge served as captain of the Toronto Junior Aeros for the 2014–15 season and earned the 2015 PWHL scoring championship.

Eldridge attended The Bishop Strachan School, an all-girls independent school in Toronto, where she was named team MVP in both the 2014 and 2015 seasons. In 2014, she was selected to attend the Under-18 Canada Strength and Conditioning Camp. Off the ice, Eldridge has been an active mentor and advocate for girls' hockey, working with the Barrie Sharks organization to support the growth of minor girls' hockey.

== Playing career ==
=== Colgate University (2015–2019) ===
Eldridge played four seasons (2015–2019) for the Colgate Raiders, finishing her collegiate career as the program's all-time leading scorer in NCAA Division I competition with 74 goals and 89 assists for 163 points in 153 games. She holds or shares 10 different program records. In her freshman season (2015–16), Eldridge recorded 9 goals and 18 assists for 27 points in 38 games. She scored her first collegiate goal on October 3, 2015, in a 6–0 victory over Robert Morris. As a sophomore in 2016–17, Eldridge emerged as a team leader with 13 goals and a team-leading 24 assists for 37 points in 36 games. She set a program record with four shorthanded goals, including a performance with two shorthanded goals in a 4–1 win over Union. Eldridge was named to the ECAC Hockey All-Conference Third Team and won the Colgate Women's Hockey Offensive MVP award.

External videos
- Colgate Athletics 2018 Athlete of the Year Colgate University, retrieved December 24, 2025

During her junior year, Eldridge led the Raiders with 22 goals and 23 assists for 45 points in 41 games. She led the nation with eight game-winning goals and recorded her first career hat trick. In the ECAC Hockey playoffs, Eldridge had consecutive three-point performances against Harvard in the semifinals, recording three assists in the first game and her first career hat trick in the second. She then scored the game-winning goal against Cornell in the ECAC semifinal with one second remaining, sending the Raiders to their first ECAC Hockey Championship game. Eldridge was named ECAC Hockey Player of the Month for February 2018 and Hockey Commissioners Association (HCA) National Player of the Month for the same period. She earned All-ECAC Hockey All-Conference Second Team honors and won her second consecutive Colgate Women's Hockey Offensive MVP award. She was also named Colgate Athletics Athlete of the Year for 2017–18. In the 2018 NCAA Division I Women's Ice Hockey Tournament, Colgate advanced to the Frozen Four, the program's first appearance in the tournament. The third-seeded Raiders defeated second-seeded Wisconsin 4–3 in double overtime in the semifinals, with Eldridge scoring a power play goal in the third period. In the championship game, Colgate fell 2–1 in overtime to top-seeded Clarkson.

As team captain in her senior year, Eldridge set program records with 30 goals and 54 points in 38 games. Her 30 goals ranked second in the nation, while her 54 points ranked fifth. She also tied for fourth nationally with six game-winning goals and tied for second with four shorthanded goals. On January 26, 2019, Eldridge became Colgate's all-time leading scorer in NCAA Division I competition when she scored her 142nd career point in a game against Cornell. She scored twice in that game, bringing her career point total to 143. Eldridge was named ECAC Hockey Player of the Month for December 2018 and February 2019, and HCA National Player of the Month for both months as well. In February, she paced the nation in scoring with 17 points on seven goals and 10 assists in eight games, recording at least one point in all eight contests and helping the Raiders to a 7–0–1 record. She was named to the All-ECAC Hockey All-Conference First Team and the USCHO Third Team.

For the third consecutive year, Eldridge won the Colgate Women's Hockey Offensive MVP award and was named Colgate Athletics Athlete of the Year. She also received the Don Palmateer Award and was the program's first-ever Patty Kazmaier Memorial Award top-10 finalist. Eldridge was a three-time ECAC Hockey All-Academic Team honoree and a four-time Raider Academic Honor Roll student. She was also nominated for the Hockey Humanitarian Award in 2018–19. Graduating in 2019, Eldridge recorded 74 goals and 89 assists, earning the top spot on Colgate's all-time points leader board. Eldridge appeared in the 2018 NCAA National Collegiate Women's Ice Hockey Tournament Championship game, an historic first in program history. In the 2018–19 Colgate Raiders women's ice hockey season, her 30-goal output broke the program record for most goals in a single season.

=== PWHPA (2019–2023) ===
Eldridge joined the Professional Women's Hockey Players Association (PWHPA), formed in May 2019 after the dissolution of the Canadian Women's Hockey League. The PWHPA was established by over 200 players who boycotted existing professional leagues in pursuit of a unified, financially sustainable professional league that would provide salaries, health insurance, and proper infrastructure. From 2019 to 2023, the PWHPA organized a series of exhibition seasons known as the Dream Gap Tour to generate support for women's professional hockey while working towards the establishment of a new league.

External videos
- Jessie Eldridge's pair of goals helps Harvey's to an 11th-straight PWHPA Dream Gap win CBC Sports, retrieved December 24, 2025

Skating for Team Bauer (Montreal), Eldridge participated in the 2021 Secret Cup, the Canadian leg of the PWHPA Dream Gap Tour held in Calgary. On May 28, 2021, she recorded a goal and an assist in a 4–3 victory over Team Scotiabank (Calgary). In the championship game on May 30, 2021, Team Bauer defeated Team Sonnet (Toronto) 4–2, with Eldridge logging a goal and an assist in the title-winning performance. In the 2021–22 PWHPA Dream Gap Tour, Eldridge joined Team Harvey's and led all skaters in scoring rate with 12 points (8 goals, 4 assists) in six games, averaging 2.0 points per game. Nine of her 12 points were primary points, and five of her goals came at even strength. During the 2022–23 season, Eldridge played for Team Harvey's and ranked third in PWHPA scoring with 22 points (8 goals, 14 assists) in 18 games. On February 10, 2023, Eldridge scored two goals and added an assist in a 5–2 victory over Team Scotiabank in Peterborough, Ontario. In the Secret Cup championship final on March 12, 2023, at Acrisure Arena in Palm Desert, California, Eldridge scored the game-winning goal with 42 seconds remaining in regulation to give Team Harvey's a dramatic 5–4 victory over Team Scotiabank. She finished the championship game with a goal and three assists for four points.

=== New York Sirens (2023–2025) ===
External videos
- Jessie Eldridge Overtime Game Winner retrieved December 24, 2025

On September 18, 2023, Eldridge was selected in the third round, 16th overall, by PWHL New York in the 2023 PWHL Draft. She signed a two-year contract with the club in November 2023. In December, following a preseason that saw her lead the league with six points in three games, Eldridge's contract was upgraded to three years.

In the 2023–24 season, Eldridge played all 24 games for New York, recording seven goals and seven assists for 14 points. New York finished in sixth place with a 6–15–3 record and failed to make the playoffs, but earned the first overall pick in the 2024 PWHL Draft.

In the 2024–25 season, rebranded as the New York Sirens, Eldridge played all 30 games and improved her offensive production with nine goals and 15 assists for 24 points, finishing as one of the league's top point producers. On January 4, 2025, she posted her best single-game performance of the season with a goal and two assists for three points against the Minnesota Frost. On January 12, 2025, Eldridge scored a controversial overtime winner against the Toronto Sceptres that was later determined to be offside, though the goal stood as the PWHL rules at the time did not include provisions for offside reviews. New York finished in last place for the second consecutive season with an 8–13–9 record.

=== Seattle Torrent (2025–2026) ===
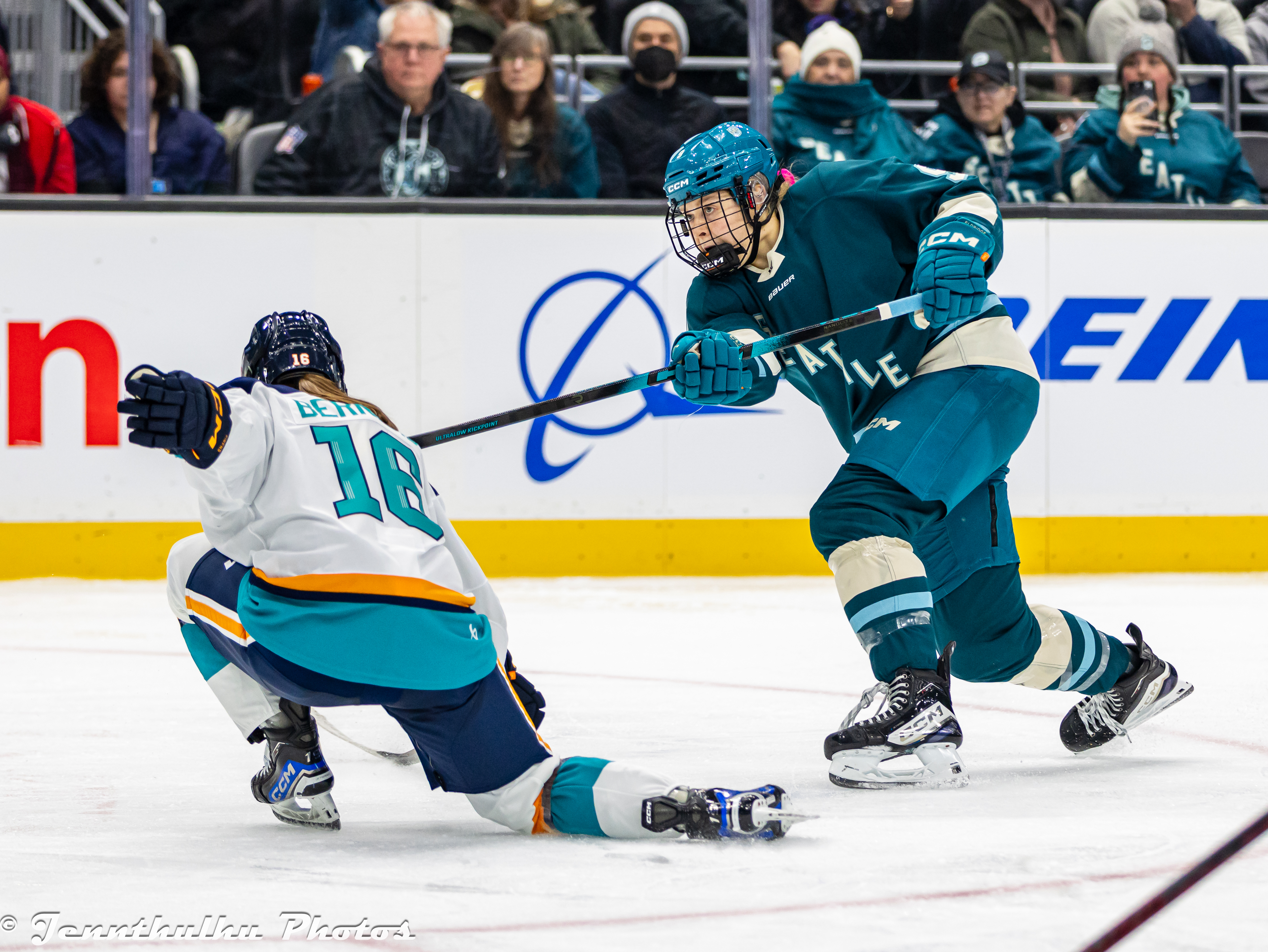
Eldridge during a game against New York Sirens, December 3, 2025

On June 9, 2025, Eldridge was selected sixth overall by the Seattle Torrent in the 2025 PWHL Expansion Draft. On November 28, 2025, Eldridge played in Seattle's historic home opener at Climate Pledge Arena, where 16,014 fans set a new U.S. attendance record for a professional women's hockey game, surpassing the previous mark of 14,288 set in Detroit. The attendance also established the highest-attended primary home venue game in PWHL history, though Seattle fell 3–0 to the two-time defending Walter Cup champion Minnesota Frost. On December 21, 2025, she scored her first goal as a Torrent player in a 3–1 loss to the Boston Fleet. Her goal came with 26 seconds remaining in the third period, spoiling goaltender Abbey Levy's shutout bid. On December 23, 2025, Eldridge assisted on Alex Carpenter's game-tying goal in the Torrent's 2–1 victory against Montreal Victoire. On January 11, 2026, Eldridge scored an unassisted goal late in the second period of a game against the Minnesota Frost which cut the Torrent's deficit to 3–1 and ending its scoreless stretch of nine games despite losing the away game 6-2. On January 20, 2026, she recorded three points with a goal and two assists in Seattle's 6–4 victory over Toronto, in the highest-scoring game of the PWHL season. The Torrent's six goals set a franchise record and matched the season high for any PWHL team. Eldridge was named the first star of the game. On January 25, 2026, Eldridge scored the Torrent's lone goal in a 3-1 loss to Vancouver in Denver as part of the PWHL Takeover Tour. Three days later, in the final game before the league's Olympic break, Eldridge recorded her third multi-point performance for the Torrent against the Ottawa Charge at TD Place and assisted on Hilary Knight's 50th career PWHL point in the second period. In the third period, she scored a top-shelf wrist shot to give Seattle a 2–1 lead and extended her goal-scoring streak to three consecutive games. The Torrent ultimately fell 4–2 after Ottawa scored three goals in the final six minutes. The game marked the end of a stretch in which Eldridge accumulated eight points in five games after recording only two points in her first nine appearances with limited minutes. Despite this, she finished the first half of the season tied for second on the Torrent in both points and goals with 10 points (5G, 5A) in 16 games.

=== Boston Fleet (2026) ===
On March 16, 2026, Eldridge was traded to the Boston Fleet in exchange for forward Theresa Schafzahl. The Athletic indicated that Eldridge had not been likely to re-sign with the Torrent and the trade looked like a "significant offensive upgrade for Boston". Eldridge finished the 2025-26 regular season tied for fifth in the PWHL in points, and tied for second in goals.

=== Montreal Victoire (2026-present) ===
On 20 June 2026 the Montreal Victoire announced that they had signed Eldridge to a two-year contract.

== International play ==
Eldridge attended Canada's National Women's Development Team selection camp in Calgary, Alberta in August 2019. Named to Canada's roster for the February 2020 Rivalry Series versus the United States, Eldridge made her senior national team debut on February 3, 2020, in Victoria, British Columbia. Canada head coach Troy Ryan noted Eldridge's "big, strong body with an offensive flair" and stated she was being given an opportunity to prove she could crack the World Championship roster. In April 2021, Eldridge was part of the National Women's Team Selection Camp roster in anticipation of the 2021 IIHF Women's World Championship. However, she was not selected for the final tournament roster and supported Team Canada as they defeated the United States 3–2 in overtime to win gold.

=== 2022 World Championship ===
Eldridge was named to Canada's roster for the 2022 IIHF Women's World Championship in Denmark. Eldridge earned her first World Championship point with an assist in Canada's opening 4–1 victory over Finland on August 25, 2022. Eldridge played seven games in the tournament and recorded two points as Canada won the gold medal.

== Personal life ==
External videos
- PWHL star in Barrie inspiring future generations CTV News, retrieved December 24, 2025

In October 2025, Eldridge was inducted into the Barrie Sports Hall of Fame. Throughout her collegiate career, Eldridge volunteered with the American Special Hockey Association, an organization serving over 9,000 members in 135 adaptive hockey organizations. She is actively involved in mentoring young female hockey players in her hometown. She regularly works with the Barrie Sharks organization to support minor girls' hockey, a cause that is important to her given that she played against boys growing up because there was no girls' organization at the time.

== Career statistics ==
=== Regular season and playoffs ===
			Regular season					Playoffs
Season	Team	League	GP	G	A	Pts	PIM	GP	G	A	Pts	PIM
2012–13	Toronto Jr. Aeros	Prov. WHL	1	1	0	1	0	—	—	—	—	—
2013–14	Toronto Jr. Aeros	Prov. WHL	38	24	20	44	22	9	1	5	6	0
2014–15	Toronto Jr. Aeros	Prov. WHL	38	29	35	64	32	14	5	9	14	4
2015–16	Colgate University	NCAA	38	9	18	27	34	—	—	—	—	—
2016–17	Colgate University	NCAA	36	13	24	37	20	—	—	—	—	—
2017–18	Colgate University	NCAA	41	22	23	45	22	—	—	—	—	—
2018–19	Colgate University	NCAA	38	30	24	54	30	—	—	—	—	—
2020–21	Montreal	PWHPA	4	3	4	7	2	—	—	—	—	—
2021–22	Montreal	PWHPA	6	5	7	12	2	—	—	—	—	—
2022–23	Team Harvey's	PWHPA	20	8	14	22	2	—	—	—	—	—
2023–24	PWHL New York	PWHL	24	7	7	14	10	—	—	—	—	—
2024–25	New York Sirens	PWHL	17	6	9	15	10	—	—	—	—	—
2025–26	Seattle Torrent	PWHL	19	7	6	13	4	—	—	—	—	—
2025–26	Boston Fleet	PWHL	11	7	3	10	0	4	0	3	3	4
PWHL totals			84	30	31	61	32	4	0	3	3	4

=== International ===
Year	Team	Event	Result	GP	G	A	Pts	PIM
2022	Canada	WC	1st place, gold medalist(s)	7	1	1	2	2
Senior totals				7	1	1	2	2

== Awards and honours ==
Honors	Year	Ref
Provincial WHL
Scoring Champion	2015	
College
ECAC Third-Team All-Star	2017	
ECAC Second-Team All-Star	2018	
ECAC First-Team All-Star	2019	
Third Team All-USCHO	2019	
Colgate University
Women's Hockey Offensive MVP	2017, 2018, 2019	
Athlete of the Year	2018, 2019	
Women's Hockey Don Palmateer Award	2019	
