= Kaley Doyle =

American ice hockey player (born 2001)

- Born: March 23, 2001 (age 25) Livonia, Michigan, U.S.
- Height: 5 ft 5 in (165 cm)
- Position: Goaltender
- Catches: Left
- PWHL team: New York Sirens

Kaley Doyle (born March 23, 2001) is an American professional ice hockey goaltender for the New York Sirens of the Professional Women's Hockey League (PWHL). She played college ice hockey for the Brown Bears and Quinnipiac Bobcats.

== Early life ==
Doyle grew up in Livonia, Michigan, and attended Stevenson High School. She played youth hockey for HoneyBaked and was a participant at the USA Hockey U18 National Camp in 2017.

== Playing career ==
=== College ===
Doyle’s 2020–21 freshman year at Brown was canceled due to the COVID-19 pandemic.

As a sophomore in 2021–22, she appeared in 21 games (19 starts) with a 2.12 goals-against average (GAA), .932 save percentage (SV%), and two shutouts. She was named to the All-ECAC Second Team, a Second-Team All-Ivy selection, and was a finalist for ECAC Rookie of the Year.

In 2022–23, she posted a 2.48 GAA and .917 SV% with two shutouts and earned All-Ivy Second Team honors. She was ECAC Goaltender of the Week on February 7, 2023.

As a senior in 2023–24, Doyle started 29 games with a 2.25 GAA and .928 SV%, recorded two shutouts, and was named First-Team All-Ivy. She earned ECAC Goaltender of the Week on January 30 and February 27, 2024.

As a graduate student at Quinnipiac in 2024–25, she started 28 games and posted career highs with a 1.29 GAA, .945 SV%, and eight shutouts, ranking among the national leaders. She was ECAC Goalie of the Month for November and earned three ECAC Goalie of the Week honors (Oct. 1, Oct. 8, Nov. 5). She was named to the All-USCHO Third Team after the season.

=== Professional ===
On June 24, 2025, Doyle was selected in the sixth round, 41st overall, by the New York Sirens in the 2025 PWHL Draft. On November 18, 2025, she signed a one-year contract with the Sirens.

== Personal life ==
Doyle is the daughter of Deanna and Doug Doyle and has two siblings. She pursued an MBA while at Quinnipiac.

== Career statistics ==
Goaltending
Season	Team	League	GP	W	L	T/OT	GAA	SV%	SO
2021–22	Brown University	ECAC	20	5	10	4	2.18	.931	2
2022–23	Brown University	ECAC	24	8	14	1	2.48	.917	2
2023–24	Brown University	ECAC	29	11	15	3	2.25	.928	2
2024–25	Quinnipiac University	ECAC	28	15	10	3	1.29	.945	8
NCAA totals			101	39	49	11	2.02	.930	14

== Awards and honors ==
Honor	Year	Ref
College
All-ECAC Second Team	2022	
All-Ivy League Second Team	2022, 2023	
All-Ivy League First Team	2024	
All-USCHO Third Team	2025	
