= Anna Bargman =

American ice hockey player (born 2002)

- Born: August 7, 2002 (age 24) Boxford, Massachusetts, U.S.
- Height: 5 ft 8 in (173 cm)
- Position: Forward
- Shoots: Left
- PWHL team: New York Sirens

Anna Bargman (born August 7, 2002) is an American professional ice hockey player who is a forward for the New York Sirens of the Professional Women's Hockey League (PWHL). She played college ice hockey for the Yale Bulldogs from 2021 to 2025, serving as team captain in 2024–25.

== Early life ==
Bargman grew up in Boxford, Massachusetts, and attended Phillips Academy Andover, where she was team captain in 2021 and helped the program to a NEPSAC Elite Eight runner-up finish in 2020. In club play with the East Coast Wizards, she won three Massachusetts state titles and a 2016 USA Hockey national championship at the youth level.

== Playing career ==
=== College ===
Bargman debuted for Yale in 2021–22, recording 23 points (11 goals, 12 assists) in 36 games. She led the Bulldogs with 34 points (17 goals, 17 assists) in 2022–23 and was named Second Team All-Ivy.

In 2023–24 she posted 20 points (12 goals, 8 assists) in 32 games and earned a second straight Second Team All-Ivy selection. As captain in 2024–25, she tallied 23 points (13 goals, 10 assists) in 32 games, reached 100 career points on February 22, 2025 versus Dartmouth, and was named First Team All-Ivy.

=== Professional ===
On June 24, 2025, Bargman was drafted in the fifth round, 33rd overall, by the New York Sirens in the 2025 PWHL Draft. On November 18, 2025, she signed a one-year contract with the Sirens, and re-signed with the club following her solid debut season for an additional two years.

== Career statistics ==
			Regular season					Playoffs
Season	Team	League	GP	G	A	Pts	PIM	GP	G	A	Pts	PIM
2021–22	Yale University	ECAC	36	11	12	23	10	—	—	—	—	—
2022–23	Yale University	ECAC	33	17	17	34	8	—	—	—	—	—
2023–24	Yale University	ECAC	32	12	8	20	10	—	—	—	—	—
2024–25	Yale University	ECAC	32	13	10	23	8	—	—	—	—	—
2025-26	New York Sirens	PWHL	29	4	2	6	6	—	—	—	—	—
PWHL totals			29	4	2	6	6	—	—	—	—	—

== Awards and honours ==
Honour	Year
College
Ivy League First Team All-Ivy	2025
Ivy League Second Team All-Ivy	2024
Ivy League Second Team All-Ivy	2023
