= Dayle Ross =

Canadian ice hockey player (born 2003)

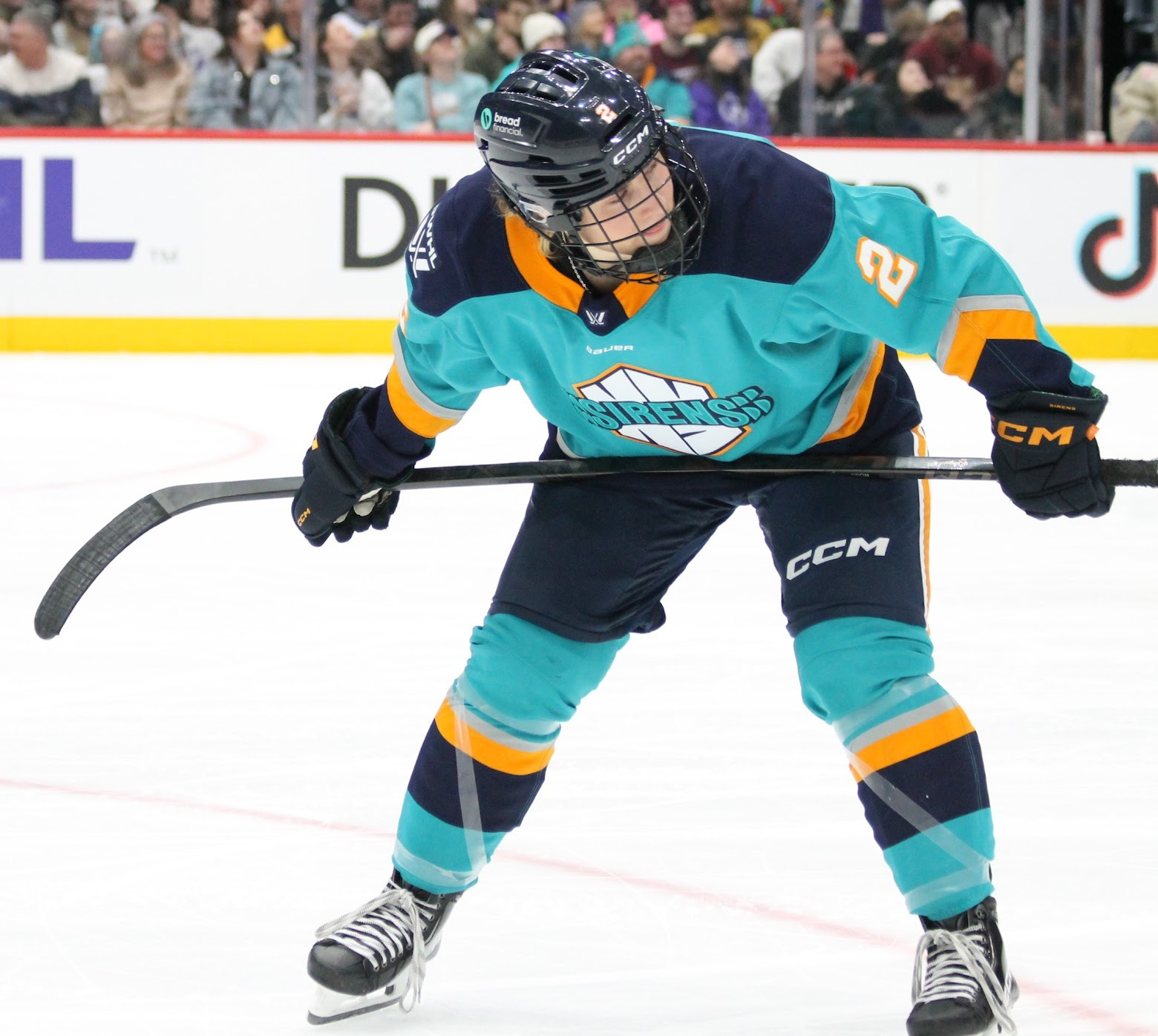
- Ross with the New York Sirens in 2026
- Born: May 26, 2003 (age 22) Spirit River, Alberta, Canada
- Height: 5 ft 6 in (168 cm)
- Position: Defence
- Shoots: Right
- PWHL team: New York Sirens
- Playing career: 2025–present

Dayle Ross (born May 26, 2003) is a Canadian ice hockey defenceman for the New York Sirens of the Professional Women's Hockey League (PWHL). She played college ice hockey for the St. Cloud State Huskies. She was selected 25th overall by New York in the 2025 PWHL Draft.

== Early life ==
Ross grew up in Spirit River, Alberta, and played for the St. Albert Slash AAA program, helping the team win the 2019 Esso Cup and earning tournament MVP honors. She was named Team Alberta MVP at the 2019 National Women’s U18 Championship.

== Playing career ==
=== College ===
Ross debuted for St. Cloud State in 2021–22 and led the team with 62 blocked shots as a freshman. As a sophomore in 2022–23 she led the NCAA in blocked shots with a program-record 104 and was named WCHA Defender of the Week on February 6, 2023. She served as a team captain in 2024–25 and matched a career high with 15 points in 36 games.

=== Professional ===
Ross was selected in the fourth round, 25th overall, by the New York Sirens in the 2025 PWHL Draft. On October 6, 2025, she signed one-year contract with the Sirens.

== International play ==
Ross was invited to Hockey Canada’s National Women’s Under-18 Summer Showcase in 2021 and previously skated for Team Alberta at the 2019 National Women’s U18 Championship, where she earned a Player of the Game award.

== Personal life ==
Ross is the daughter of Warren and Goldie Ross. She studied community health and has worked as a power skating coach.

== Career statistics ==
=== Regular season and playoffs ===
			Regular season					Playoffs
Season	Team	League	GP	G	A	Pts	PIM	GP	G	A	Pts	PIM
2021–22	St. Cloud State	WCHA	33	1	2	3	12	—	—	—	—	—
2022–23	St. Cloud State	WCHA	37	1	14	15	21	—	—	—	—	—
2023–24	St. Cloud State	WCHA	36	3	4	7	30	—	—	—	—	—
2024–25	St. Cloud State	WCHA	36	2	13	15	29	—	—	—	—	—
2025–26	New York Sirens	PWHL	16	0	0	0	0	—	—	—	—	—
PWHL totals			16	0	0	0	0	—	—	—	—	—
