= Callie Shanahan =

American ice hockey player (born 2003)

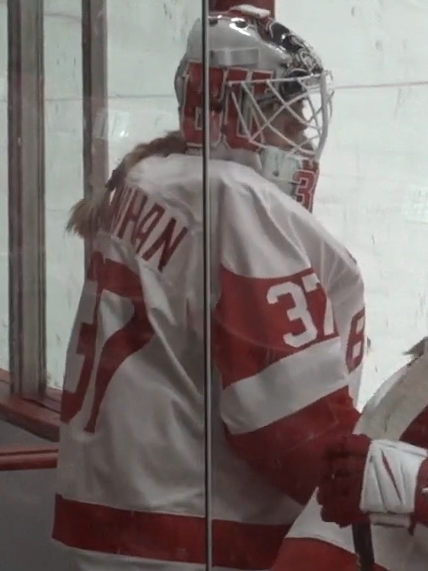
- Shanahan with the Boston University Terriers in 2021
- Born: May 26, 2003 (age 23) Commerce Township, Michigan, U.S.
- Height: 178 cm (5 ft 10 in)
- Position: Goaltender
- Catches: Left
- PWHL team: New York Sirens
Medal record
World Championships
Gold medal – first place	2026 Denmark

Callie Shanahan (born May 26, 2003) is an American professional ice hockey player who is a goaltender for the New York Sirens of the Professional Women's Hockey League (PWHL).

== Playing career ==
=== Collegiate ===
Shanahan played four seasons (2021–2025) with the Boston University Terriers in Hockey East. She was named to the conference All-Rookie Team in 2021–22, and as a senior in 2024–25 backstopped BU to the Hockey East tournament championship, earning a spot on the All-Tournament Team. She was also selected Hockey East Goaltender of the Month (October 2024) and earned multiple weekly awards.

=== Professional ===
Shanahan was drafted in the fourth round, 28th overall, by the New York Sirens in 2025. Entering the 2025–26 preseason, coverage identified her as a contender for New York’s backup role. On October 22, 2025, she signed a one-year contract with the Sirens.

== International play ==
As a member of the United States under-18 team, Shanahan won gold at the 2020 IIHF U18 Women’s World Championship in Bratislava, Slovakia.

== Career statistics ==
NCAA

Season	Team	League	GP	W	L	T	SO	GAA	SV%
2021–22	Boston University	Hockey East	14	6	6	2	1	2.34	.925
2022–23	Boston University	Hockey East	12	4	6	1	0	3.15	.902
2023–24	Boston University	Hockey East	13	4	8	1	2	2.20	.911
2024–25	Boston University	Hockey East	30	18	9	2	3	1.81	.924
Totals			69	32	29	6	6	2.22	.918

Source: Hockey East.

== Awards and honours ==
- Hockey East All-Rookie Team (2021–22)
- Hockey East All-Tournament Team (2024–25)
- Hockey East Goaltender of the Month (October 2024)

== Personal life ==
Shanahan is from Commerce Township, Michigan. She graduated from Boston University in 2025 with a degree in public relations. Off the ice, she has said she enjoys hiking and other outdoor activities.
