= Abbey Levy =

American ice hockey player (born 2000)

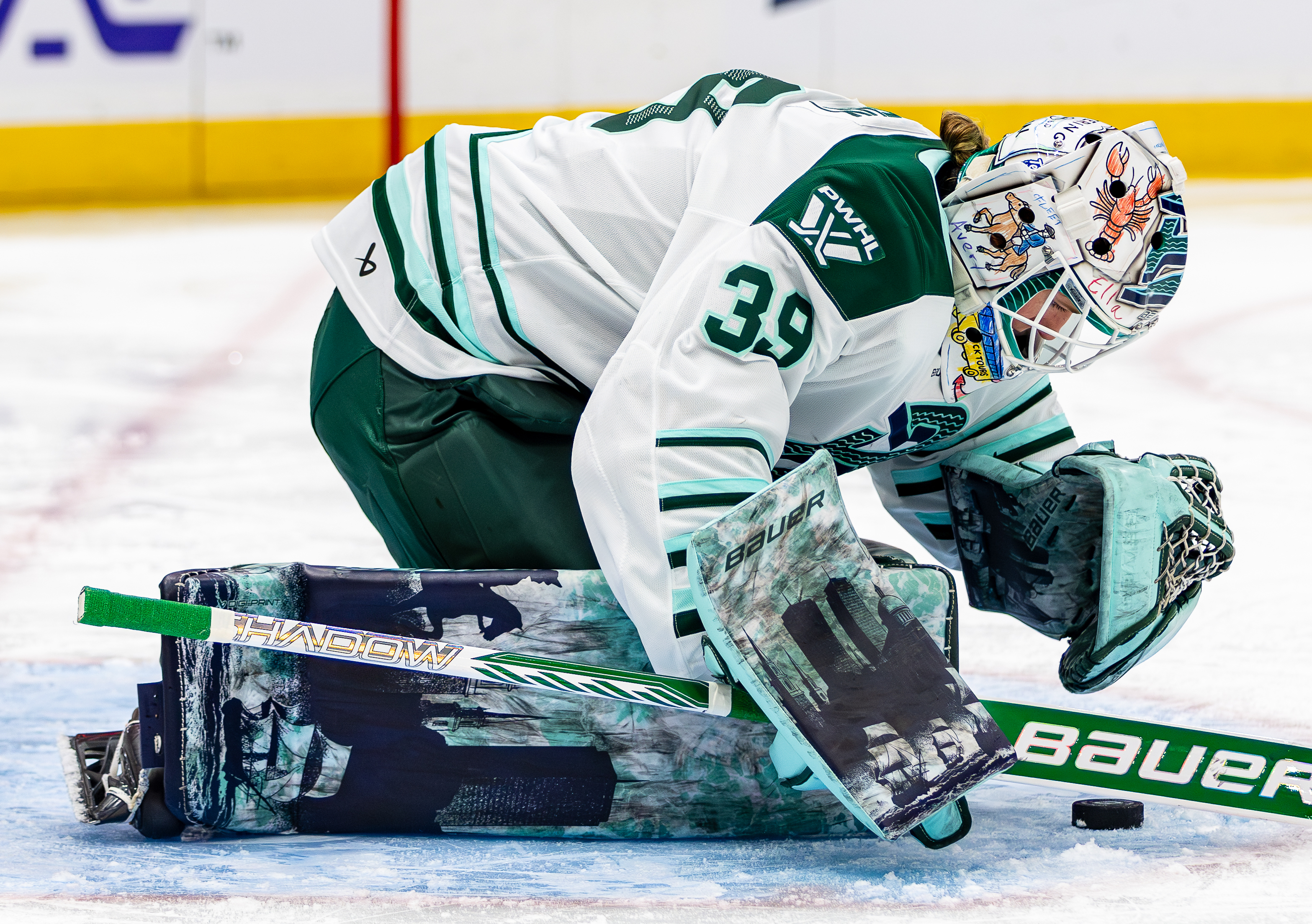
- Levy with the Boston Fleet in 2026
- Born: April 2, 2000 (age 26) Congers, New York, U.S.
- Height: 6 ft 1 in (185 cm)
- Weight: 150 lb (68 kg; 10 st 10 lb)
- Position: Goaltender
- Catches: Left
- PWHL team Former teams: San Jose Sea Lions; New York Sirens; Boston Fleet
- National team: United States
- Playing career: 2023–present

Abigail Levy (born April 2, 2000) is an American professional ice hockey player who is a goaltender for the San Jose Sea Lions of the Professional Women's Hockey League (PWHL). She previously played for the New York Sirens and Boston Fleet of the PWHL.

== Playing career ==
=== Amateur ===
==== Shattuck St. Mary's ====
Levy attended Shattuck St. Mary's, where she played for their 16U and 19U teams and won three USA Hockey National Championships in three seasons, allowing an average of just one goal per game in tournament play.

==== Minnesota State ====
Levy announced her commitment to Minnesota State University on May 8, 2016. In her freshman season with the Mavericks, the 2018–19 season, she started 34 games and set single-season team records for shutouts (5) and minutes played. She recorded her first NCAA assist on December 17, 2018, against Robert Morris University.

In the 2019–20 season, Levy started 20 games and appeared in 22, of which she won just five. At the conclusion of her sophomore season, she held MSU records for save percentage (.917) and goals against average (2.58), as well as ranking second in shutouts (8), fifth in wins (14), and sixth in saves (1,530).

==== Boston College ====
Levy transferred to Boston College for the 2020–21 season, posting two shutouts and six wins in eleven games. In the quarterfinals of the 2021 NCAA championship, she made 45 saves in a 3–1 loss to Ohio State University.

In the 2021–22 season, Levy started a career-high 33 games, all but one that the Eagles played that year. She finished fifth in the NCAA in wins with 18, and first in saves with 1,143, the latter also setting an Eagles record. She recorded two assists and two 50-save games, including a 50-save loss to Harvard University in the finals of the Beanpot tournament.

Playing as a graduate student in 2022–23, Levy was named alternate captain of the Eagles. She matched her career best in shutouts, including one in the Beanpot semifinals. Her career-high .947 save percentage ranked second in the nation and was the best single-season mark in Eagles history. She was the first female goaltender in Hockey East history to play an entire conference slate with a save percentage above .945 and goals against average below 1.75 (minimum 30 shots against per game), and was a semifinalist for National Goalie of the Year and runner-up for Hockey East Goaltender of the Year.

At the end of her Boston College career, Levy held the program records for save percentage (.940) and saves per game (31.96), and ranked top five in multiple other categories.

=== Professional ===
As a graduating NCAA athlete, Levy was not eligible for pre-draft free agency in the newly established Professional Women's Hockey League (PWHL). She was selected 64th overall by PWHL New York in the eleventh round of the 2023 PWHL draft, and signed a one-year contract with the team on November 8, 2023. During the inaugural PWHL season, she recorded the team's first home-ice victory, a 3–2 shootout victory over Montreal on February 21, 2024, and finished the season with a .906 save percentage. She signed a one-year contract extension with New York on June 21, 2024. On June 20, 2025, after appearing in just two games in the 2024–25 season, she signed a one-year contract with the Boston Fleet. On June 21, 2026, Levy signed a one-year contract with expansion side San Jose Sea Lions.

== International play ==
Medal record

Representing United States

Women's ice hockey

World Championship
Gold medal – first place	2023 Canada	

Levy made her international debut representing the United States at the 2023 IIHF Women's World Championship. As the third-string goaltender for the gold medal-winning Americans, Levy did not play a game in the tournament.

== Personal life ==
Levy has four siblings; her brother Harrison played lacrosse at SUNY Oswego. She has also played basketball, soccer, and volleyball. She received a bachelor's degree in applied psychology and human development from the Lynch School of Education and Human Development in 2022.

Levy is Jewish and a member of the LGBT Community. She was a fan of the New York Islanders as a kid, with her family having been Islanders season ticket holders. She wears the jersey number 39 in honor of Rick DiPietro.

== Career statistics ==
			Regular season									Playoffs
Season	Team	League	GP	W	L	T/OT	MIN	GA	SO	GAA	SV%	GP	W	L	MIN	GA	SO	GAA	SV%
2018–19	Minnesota State University	WCHA	34	9	18	7	2,069	81	5	2.35	.924	—	—	—	—	—	—	—	—
2019–20	Minnesota State University	WCHA	22	5	12	3	1,191	59	3	2.97	.903	—	—	—	—	—	—	—	—
2020–21	Boston College	HE	11	6	4	0	609	18	2	1.77	.932	—	—	—	—	—	—	—	—
2021–22	Boston College	HE	33	18	14	1	1,982	53	1	2.51	.932	—	—	—	—	—	—	—	—
2022–23	Boston College	HE	30	16	13	1	1,435	45	5	1.77	.947	—	—	—	—	—	—	—	—
2023–24	New York	PWHL	8	1	5	2	469	24	0	3.07	.906	—	—	—	—	—	—	—	—
2024–25	New York Sirens	PWHL	2	0	1	0	77	5	0	3.90	.848	—	—	—	—	—	—	—	—
2025-26	Boston Fleet	PWHL	3	1	1	1	181	7	0	2.33	.927	—	—	—	—	—	—	—	—
PWHL totals			13	2	7	3	727	29	0	2.97	.906	—	—	—	—	—	—	—	—

== Awards and honors ==
Award	Year
College
All-WCHA Second Team	2019
All-WCHA Rookie Team	2019
Minnesota State Rookie of the Year	2019
Minnesota State Most Valuable Player	2019
Minnesota State 3-Star Award	2019
WCHA Scholar Athlete	2020
WCHA All-Academic Team	2020
Bertagna Award	2022
Hockey East Second Team All-Star	2023
