= List of Toronto Sceptres players =

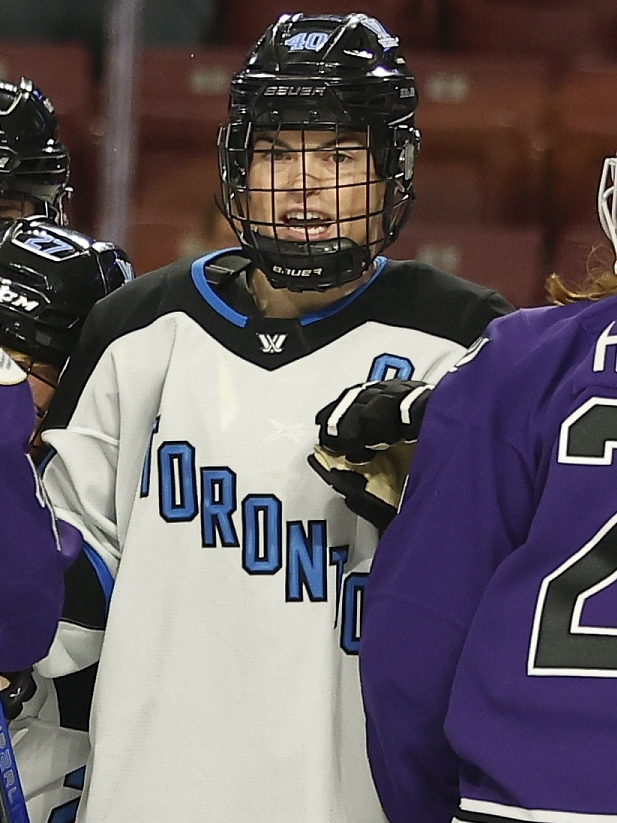
Blayre Turnbull, the franchise's first and current captain.

The Toronto Sceptres are a professional women's ice hockey team based in Toronto, Ontario, Canada. They were established on 29 August 2023, as one of the six charter franchises of the Professional Women's Hockey League (PWHL). The team plays its home games at Coca-Cola Coliseum and is managed by general manager Gina Kingsbury with Troy Ryan serving as head coach.

The Sceptres played the league’s inaugural game on 1 January 2024, against PWHL New York. While they were shut out in that first game, the franchise’s first goal was scored by Natalie Spooner in a 3–2 win over PWHL New York on 5 January 2024. Spooner went on to lead the league in goals (20) and points (27) in the 2023–24 season, winning many awards including the Billie Jean King MVP Award and earning a spot on the PWHL First Team All-Star Team. Toronto finished the regular season in first place but was eliminated by Minnesota in a five-game semifinal series.

They also had the first shorthanded "jailbreak" goal in PWHL history scored by Emma Maltais on 5 January 2024 against PWHL New York, the first shootout win with the winning goal scored by Lauriane Rougeau against PWHL Montreal on 20 January 2024.

The Sceptres went undefeated in February 2024, helping them go on an 11-game win streak which began on 26 January 2024 against PWHL New York with a 2-0 shutout and ended on 20 March 2024 with the 11th win, a 2-1 showing over PWHL Boston.

In the 2024–25 season, Kristen Campbell led the team in goaltending stats and was previously named the PWHL’s inaugural Goaltender of the Year in 2023–24.

As of the conclusion of the 2025–26 season, 51 players have appeared in at least one game for the franchise; of them, 5 are goaltenders, while 46 are skaters.

== Key ==
Key of colours and symbols
#	Number worn for majority of tenure with the Sceptres
WC	Walter Cup Champion
*	Current member of the Sceptres organization (including reserves)
†	Walter Cup champion, retired jersey, or elected to the Hockey Hall of Fame

Skaters
Pos	Position
D	Defender
F	Forward

The seasons column lists the first year of the season of the player's first game and the last year of the season of the player's last game. For example, a player who played one game in the 2023–24 season would be listed as playing with the team from 2023–24, regardless of what calendar year the game occurred within.

Statistics are complete to the end of the 2025–26 PWHL season.

== Goaltenders ==
Note: GP = Games played; Min, TOI = Minutes played; W = Wins; L = Losses; OTL = Overtime losses; GA = Goals-against; GAA = Goals-against average; SO = Shutouts; SV% = Save percentage;

Name	#	Nationality	Seasons	Regular season							Playoffs						Notes
Name	#	Nationality	Seasons	GP	W	L	OTL	SO	GAA	SV%	GP	W	L	SO	GAA	SV%	Notes
Campbell, Kristen	50	Canada	2023–2025	43	25	14	3	3	2.12	.919	8	3	5	2	2.29	.908	PWHL Goaltender of the Year 2024
Chuli, Elaine	29	Canada	2025–2026	8	3	5	0	0	2.89	.893	0	0	0	0	0.00	.000	
Howe, Erica	37	Canada	2023–2024	3	1	1	0	0	1.89	.921	0	0	0	0	0	0	
Kirk, Raygan*	1	Canada	2024–present	33	13	9	8	3	1.98	.930	0	0	0	0	0	0	
Jackson, Carly	70	Canada	2024–2025	1	1	0	0	0	0.93	.962	1	0	1	0	3.16	.846	

== Skaters ==
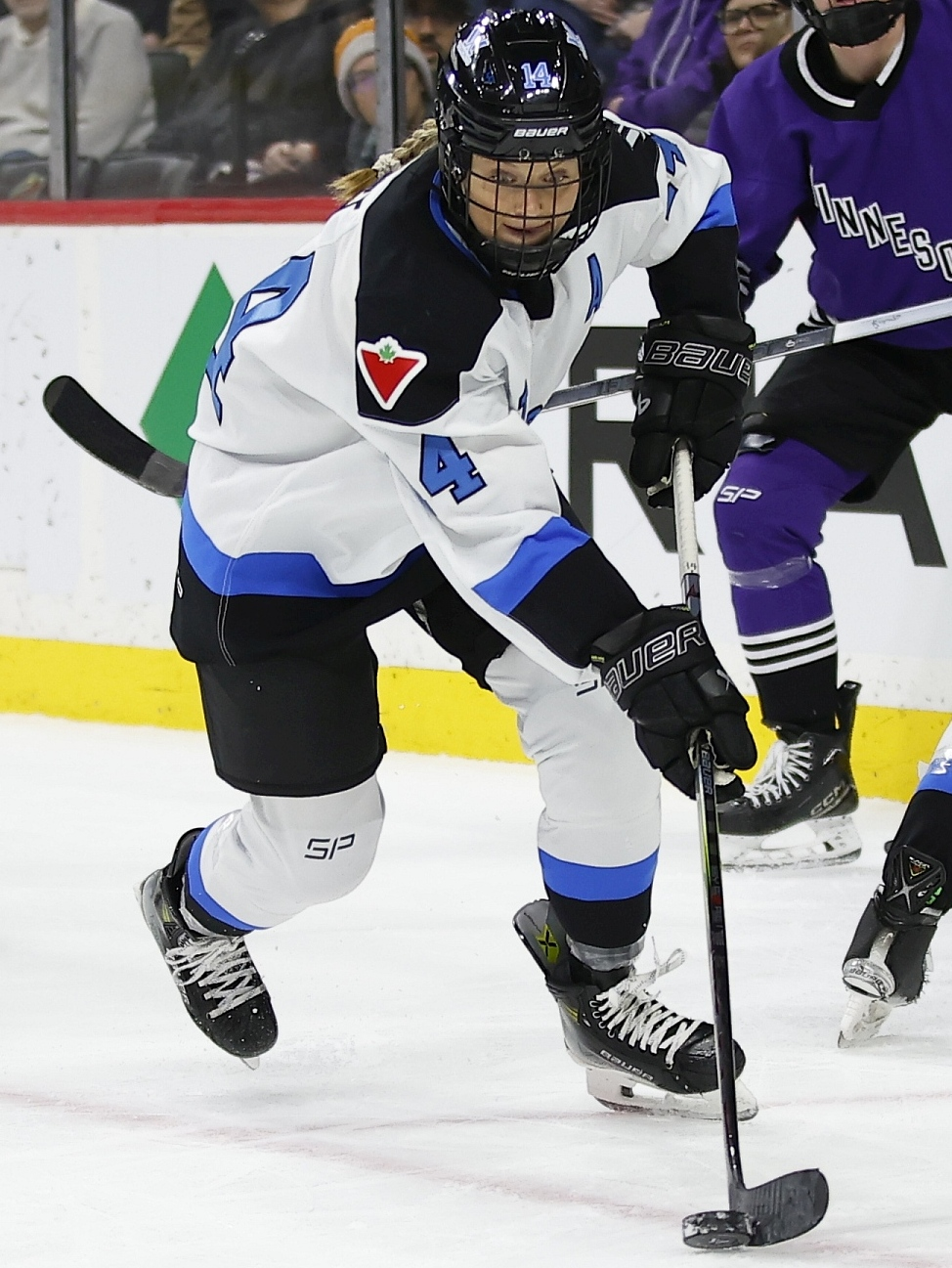
Renata Fast won the PWHL Defender of the Year in the 2024-25 campaign.

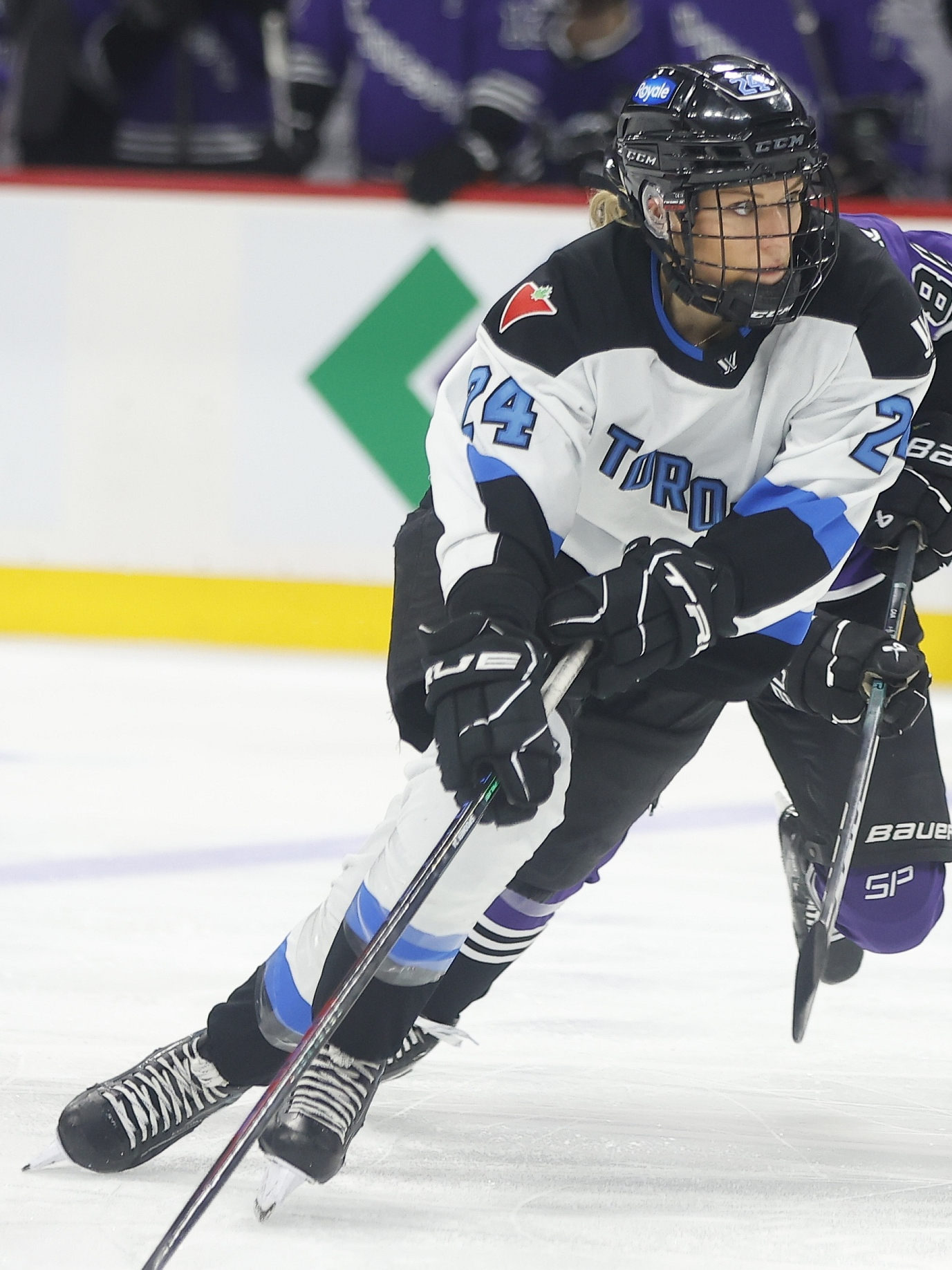
Natalie Spooner won four individual PWHL awards with the Sceptres during the 2024 season.

Note: GP = Games played; G = Goals; A = Assists; Pts = Points; PIM = Penalty minutes;

Name	#	Nationality	Pos	Seasons	Regular season					Playoffs					Notes
Name	#	Nationality	Pos	Seasons	GP	G	A	Pts	PIM	GP	G	A	Pts	PIM	Notes
Bach, Victoria	51	Canada	F	2023–2025	22	2	3	5	4	5	0	1	1	0	
Baskin, Hanna*	10	United States	D	2025–present	11	0	0	0	2	0	0	0	0	0	
Bernard, Lauren	19	United States	D	2024–2025	15	0	1	1	2	0	0	0	0	0	
Carter, Megan	23	Canada	D	2024–2025	19	0	1	1	10	4	0	0	0	6	
Cogan, Samantha	17	Canada	F	2023–2024	23	2	0	2	6	5	0	0	0	0	
Compher, Jesse	18	United States	F	2023–2026	84	16	19	35	47	9	1	3	4	2	
Connors, Maggie*	22	Canada	F	2023–present	84	8	5	13	18	9	1	1	2	0	
Dalton, Claire*	42	Canada	F	2025–present	30	1	9	10	6	0	0	0	0	0	
Daniel, Izzy	8	United States	F	2024–2025	30	2	5	7	8	4	0	1	1	0	
DeGeorge, Clair	8	United States	F	2025–2026	17	0	0	0	4	0	0	0	0	0	
Della Rovere, Kristin*	21	Canada	F	2025–present	5	0	0	0	2	0	0	0	0	0	
Kondas, Jessica*	2	Canada	D	2024–present	1	1	0	1	0	0	0	0	0	0	
Fast, Renata*	14	Canada	D	2023–present	80	10	35	45	66	9	0	5	5	6	PWHL Defender of the Year 2025
Flanagan, Kali*	6	United States	D	2023–present	84	8	12	20	12	9	1	3	4	2	
Gentry, Emma*	20	United States	F	2025–present	27	1	1	2	14	0	0	0	0	0	
Gosling, Julia	88	Canada	F	2024–2025	30	4	6	10	6	4	3	0	3	0	
Harmon, Savannah	15	United States	D	2024–2026	54	2	10	12	8	4	1	1	2	0	
Hjalmarsson, Sara*	19	Sweden	F	2025–present	30	3	0	3	6	0	0	0	0	0	
Howard, Brittany	41	Canada	F	2023–2024	23	2	6	8	10	5	0	1	1	0	
Jones, Jess	23	Canada	F	2023–2024	5	0	0	0	0	2	0	0	0	0	
Kjellbin, Anna	71	Sweden	D	2024–2026	37	1	5	6	4	4	1	1	2	0	
Kluge, Laura	25	Germany	F	2024–2025	13	0	2	2	2	3	0	0	0	0	
Knowles, Olivia	7	Canada	D	2023–2024	20	0	1	1	6	5	0	0	0	2	
Kondas, Jessica*	2	Canada	D	2024–present	15	1	0	1	2	0	0	0	0	0	
Larocque, Jocelyne	3	Canada	D	2023–2025	29	1	11	12	6	5	0	1	1	6	
Leslie, Rebecca	19	Canada	F	2023–2024	24	2	7	9	12	5	1	0	1	0	
MacKinnon, Ryland	55	Canada	D	2024–2025	22	0	2	2	27	1	0	0	0	2	
Maltais, Emma	27	Canada	F	2023–2026	84	11	27	38	54	9	2	4	6	2	
Messier, Lauren*	16	Canada	F	2025–present	5	1	0	1	0	0	0	0	0	0	
Miller, Hannah	34	Canada	F	2023–2025	52	17	21	38	16	9	2	4	6	0	
Munroe, Allie*	12	Canada	D	2023–present	73	2	8	10	32	9	1	1	2	8	Intact Impact Award 2025
Neubauerová, Noemi	61	Czech Republic	F	2024–2025	20	0	0	0	4	0	0	0	0	0	
Nurse, Sarah	20	Canada	F	2023–2025	45	17	20	37	22	9	0	2	2	4	
Poulin-Labelle, Maude	76	Canada	D	2023–2024	11	0	0	0	0	0	0	0	0	0	
Rankila, Anneke*	13	United States	F	2024–present	3	0	0	0	0	0	0	0	0	0	
Rougeau, Lauriane	5	Canada	D	2023–2024	24	0	1	1	4	5	0	0	0	0	
Scamurra, Hayley	16	United States	F	2024–2025	19	1	2	3	6	4	1	0	1	0	
Shelton, Ella*	17	Canada	D	2025–present	30	3	4	7	12	0	0	0	0	0	
Spooner, Natalie*	24	Canada	F	2023–present	68	26	14	40	12	7	1	2	3	2	Billie Jean King MVP Award 2024; PWHL Forward of the Year 2024; PWHL Points Leader Award 2024; PWHL Top Goal Scorer Award 2024
Turnbull, Blayre*	40	Canada	F	2023–present	84	17	20	37	44	9	4	1	5	2	Captain 2023–present
Van Wieran, Clara*	25	United States	F	2025–present	29	0	2	2	23	0	0	0	0	0	
Vasko, Alexa	10	Canada	F	2023–2024	24	2	0	2	4	5	0	0	0	2	
Watts, Daryl	9	Canada	F	2024–2026	57	22	24	46	16	4	1	1	2	2	
Willoughby, Kaitlin	28	Canada	F	2023–2025	43	0	1	1	2	5	0	0	0	0	
Woods, Emma*	67	Canada	F	2024–present	60	4	2	6	22	4	0	2	2	0	Intact Impact Award 2026
Zanon, Kiara*	11	United States	F	2025–present	30	1	2	3	6	0	0	0	0	0	
