= 2025–26 Toronto Sceptres season =

Professional Women's Hockey League season

2025–26 Toronto Sceptres
- League: 5th PWHL
- 2025–26 record: 10–1–6–13
- Home record: 2–1–6–6
- Road record: 8–0–0–7
- Goals for: 51
- Goals against: 69

Team information
- General manager: Gina Kingsbury
- Coach: Troy Ryan
- Captain: Blayre Turnbull
- Alternate captains: Renata Fast; Allie Munroe
- Arena: Coca-Cola Coliseum
- Average attendance: 9,109

Team leaders
- Goals: Daryl Watts (10)
- Assists: Claire Dalton; Renata Fast; Daryl Watts (9)
- Points: Daryl Watts (19)
- Penalty minutes: Emma Maltais (24)
- Plus/minus: Four tied at (+2)
- Wins: Raygan Kirk (8)
- Goals against average: Raygan Kirk (1.87)

The 2025–26 Toronto Sceptres season is the team's third season as a member of the Professional Women's Hockey League. They play their home games at Coca-Cola Coliseum in Toronto.

== Schedule and results ==
=== Preseason ===
The preseason schedule was published on October 8, 2025.

Pre-season camp

| Date | Opponent | Score | OT | Decision | Location | Box Score/Recap |
|---|---|---|---|---|---|---|
| November 16 | @ Ottawa | 3–2 | OT | Chuli | TD Place Arena | |
| November 17 | @ Ottawa | 3–0 | | Kirk | TD Place Arena | |

=== Standings ===
| Pos | Team | Pld | W | OTW | OTL | L | GF | GA | GD | Pts | Qualification |
|---|---|---|---|---|---|---|---|---|---|---|---|
| 1 | Montreal Victoire (Y) | 30 | 16 | 6 | 2 | 6 | 78 | 41 | +37 | 62 (Note: Greater number of games won, excluding games won by Shootout: Montreal 19, Boston 18) | Playoffs |
| 2 | Boston Fleet (X) | 30 | 16 | 5 | 4 | 5 | 74 | 45 | +29 | 62 | Playoffs |
| 3 | Minnesota Frost (X) | 30 | 13 | 3 | 5 | 9 | 91 | 73 | +18 | 50 | Playoffs |
| 4 | Ottawa Charge (X) | 30 | 9 | 8 | 1 | 12 | 71 | 73 | −2 | 44 | Playoffs |
| 5 | Toronto Sceptres (E) | 30 | 10 | 1 | 6 | 13 | 51 | 72 | −21 | 38 | |
| 6 | Vancouver Goldeneyes (E) | 30 | 9 | 3 | 4 | 14 | 68 | 81 | −13 | 37 | |
| 7 | New York Sirens (E) | 30 | 9 | 3 | 3 | 15 | 63 | 83 | −20 | 36 | |
| 8 | Seattle Torrent (E) | 30 | 8 | 1 | 5 | 16 | 64 | 92 | −28 | 31 | |

Updated to match(es) played on April 25, 2026. Source: PWHL
(E) Eliminated; (X) Clinched playoff berth; (Y) Clinched first place

=== Regular season ===
The regular season schedule was published on October 1, 2025. The season began on November 21, 2025, and will end on April 25, 2026, with two breaks for international competition. Toronto will play 30 games, along with the other seven PWHL teams.

All times in Eastern Time.

Regular season schedule (Home: 2–1–6–6; Road: 8–0–0–7)
November: 1–0–0–1, 3 points (Home: 0–0–0–1; Road: 1–0–0–0)

| Game | Date | Opponent | Score | OT | Decision | Location | Attendance | Record | Points | Box Score/Recap |
|---|---|---|---|---|---|---|---|---|---|---|
| 1 | November 21 | @ Minnesota | 2–1 | | Kirk | Grand Casino Arena | 9,138 | 1–0–0–0 | 3 | |
| 2 | November 29 | Boston | 1–3 | | Kirk | Coca-Cola Coliseum | 8,277 | 1–0–0–1 | 3 | |

December: 3–0–2–2, 11 points (Home: 1–0–2–1; Road: 2–0–0–1)

| Game | Date | Opponent | Score | OT | Decision | Location | Attendance | Record | Points | Box Score/Recap |
|---|---|---|---|---|---|---|---|---|---|---|
| 3 | December 4 | Ottawa | 3–1 | | Chuli | Coca-Cola Coliseum | 7,715 | 2–0–0–1 | 6 | |
| 4 | December 7 | @ Montreal | 1–3 | | Kirk | Place Bell | 8,113 | 2–0–0–2 | 6 | |
| 5 | December 17 | Montreal | 1–2 | SO | Kirk | Scotiabank Centre | 10,438 | 2–0–1–2 | 7 | |
| 6 | December 21 | @ New York | 4–3 | | Chuli | Prudential Center | 3,517 | 3–0–1–2 | 10 | |
| 7 | December 23 | Ottawa | 3–4 | OT | Kirk | Coca-Cola Coliseum | 8,108 | 3–0–2–2 | 11 | |
| 8 | December 27 | @ Montreal | 2–1 | | Chuli | Bell Centre | 18,107 | 4–0–2–2 | 14 | |
| 9 | December 30 | Minnesota | 1–5 | | Chuli | Coca-Cola Coliseum | 8,318 | 4–0–2–3 | 14 | |

January: 0–1–1–5, 3 points (Home: 0–1–1–1; Road: 0–0–0–4)

| Game | Date | Opponent | Score | OT | Decision | Location | Attendance | Record | Points | Box Score/Recap |
|---|---|---|---|---|---|---|---|---|---|---|
| 10 | January 3 | Seattle | 2–3 | SO | Kirk | TD Coliseum | 16,012 | 4–0–3–3 | 15 | |
| 11 | January 6 | New York | 0–2 | | Chuli | Coca-Cola Coliseum | 7,924 | 4–0–3–4 | 15 | |
| 12 | January 14 | @ Boston | 1–2 | | Kirk | Tsongas Center | 3,372 | 4–0–3–5 | 15 | |
| 13 | January 17 | Vancouver | 2–1 | OT | Kirk | Scotiabank Arena | 17,856 | 4–1–3–5 | 17 | |
| 14 | January 20 | @ Seattle | 4–6 | | Kirk | Climate Pledge Arena | 10,160 | 4–1–3–6 | 17 | |
| 15 | January 22 | @ Vancouver | 0–5 | | Chuli | Pacific Coliseum | 14,006 | 4–1–3–7 | 17 | |
| 16 | January 28 | @ Montreal | 0–3 | | Kirk | Place Bell | 8,018 | 4–1–3–8 | 17 | |

February: 1–0–0–0, 3 points (Home: 0–0–0–0; Road: 1–0–0–0)

| Game | Date | Opponent | Score | OT | Decision | Location | Attendance | Record | Points | Box Score/Recap |
|---|---|---|---|---|---|---|---|---|---|---|
| 17 | February 27 | @ Seattle | 5–2 | | Kirk | Climate Pledge Arena | 17,335 | 5–1–3–8 | 20 | |

March: 3–0–2–2, 11 points (Home: 1–0–2–2; Road: 2–0–0–0)

| Game | Date | Opponent | Score | OT | Decision | Location | Attendance | Record | Points | Box Score/Recap |
|---|---|---|---|---|---|---|---|---|---|---|
| 18 | March 1 | @ Vancouver | 2–1 | | Kirk | Pacific Coliseum | 13,264 | 6–1–3–8 | 23 | |
| 19 | March 3 | Montreal | 3–4 | SO | Kirk | Coca-Cola Coliseum | 8,671 | 6–1–4–8 | 24 | |
| 20 | March 8 | Minnesota | 2–3 | OT | Kirk | Coca-Cola Coliseum | 8,604 | 6–1–5–8 | 25 | |
| 21 | March 15 | Seattle | 2–0 | | Kirk | Coca-Cola Coliseum | 8,270 | 7–1–5–8 | 28 | |
| 22 | March 17 | @ Boston | 2–0 | | Kirk | Agganis Arena | 6,095 | 8–1–5–8 | 31 | |
| 23 | March 27 | Boston | 0–4 | | Chuli | Coca-Cola Coliseum | 8,636 | 8–1–5–9 | 31 | |
| 24 | March 29 | Vancouver | 2–3 | | Chuli | Coca-Cola Coliseum | 8,631 | 8–1–5–10 | 31 | |

April: 2–0–1–3, 7 points (Home: 0–0–1–1; Road: 2–0–0–2)

| Game | Date | Opponent | Score | OT | Decision | Location | Attendance | Record | Points | Box Score/Recap |
|---|---|---|---|---|---|---|---|---|---|---|
| 25 | April 1 | @ Ottawa | 2–1 | | Kirk | Scotiabank Saddledome | 16,150 | 9–1–5–10 | 34 | |
| 26 | April 11 | Ottawa | 0–2 | | Kirk | Coca-Cola Coliseum | 8,716 | 9–1–5–11 | 34 | |
| 27 | April 15 | @ New York | 2–3 | | Kirk | Prudential Center | 6,273 | 9–1–5–12 | 34 | |
| 28 | April 19 | @ Minnesota | 2–0 | | Kirk | Grand Casino Arena | 8,530 | 10–1–5–12 | 37 | |
| 29 | April 21 | New York | 0–1 | OT | Kirk | Coca-Cola Coliseum | 8,685 | 10–1–6–12 | 38 | |
| 30 | April 25 | @ Ottawa | 0–3 | | Kirk | TD Place Arena | 8,306 | 10–1–6–13 | 38 | |

Regulation Win (3 points) Overtime/Shootout win (2 points) Overtime/shootout loss (1 point) Regulation Loss (0 points)

== Player statistics ==
As of April 25, 2026

=== Skaters ===
Regular Season
| Player | GP | G | A | Pts | SOG | +/− | PIM |
|---|---|---|---|---|---|---|---|
| Daryl Watts | 27 | 10 | 9 | 19 | 86 | 0 | 4 |
| Blayre Turnbull | 30 | 9 | 8 | 17 | 76 | +1 | 10 |
| Jesse Compher | 30 | 6 | 6 | 12 | 71 | –5 | 14 |
| Emma Maltais | 30 | 3 | 7 | 10 | 52 | –8 | 24 |
| Renata Fast | 26 | 1 | 9 | 10 | 55 | –3 | 18 |
| Claire Dalton | 30 | 1 | 9 | 10 | 36 | +2 | 6 |
| Natalie Spooner | 30 | 3 | 5 | 8 | 75 | –7 | 6 |
| Ella Shelton | 30 | 3 | 4 | 7 | 59 | –3 | 12 |
| Kali Flanagan | 30 | 2 | 5 | 7 | 52 | –10 | 4 |
| Savannah Harmon | 30 | 2 | 4 | 6 | 52 | –10 | 6 |
| Maggie Connors | 30 | 3 | 2 | 5 | 58 | –6 | 6 |
| Anna Kjellbin | 30 | 1 | 3 | 4 | 19 | +2 | 4 |
| Sara Hjalmarsson | 30 | 3 | 0 | 3 | 32 | –5 | 6 |
| Kiara Zanon | 30 | 1 | 2 | 3 | 27 | –7 | 6 |
| Emma Gentry | 27 | 1 | 1 | 2 | 29 | –6 | 14 |
| Emma Woods | 30 | 1 | 1 | 2 | 26 | –4 | 8 |
| Allie Munroe | 19 | 0 | 2 | 2 | 8 | +2 | 12 |
| Clara Van Wieren | 29 | 0 | 2 | 2 | 21 | 0 | 23 |
| Lauren Messier | 5 | 1 | 0 | 1 | 3 | +1 | 0 |
| Kristin Della Rovere | 5 | 0 | 0 | 0 | 1 | 0 | 2 |
| Hanna Baskin | 11 | 0 | 0 | 0 | 3 | –1 | 2 |
| Jessica Kondas | 14 | 0 | 0 | 0 | 5 | +2 | 2 |

=== Goaltenders ===
Regular Season
| Player | GP | TOI | W | L | OT | SOL | GA | GAA | SA | SV% | SO | G | A | PIM |
|---|---|---|---|---|---|---|---|---|---|---|---|---|---|---|
| Raygan Kirk | 23 | 1349:09 | 8 | 8 | 3 | 3 | 42 | 1.87 | 641 | 0.934 | 3 | 0 | 0 | 2 |
| Elaine Chuli | 8 | 456:29 | 3 | 5 | 0 | 0 | 22 | 2.89 | 206 | 0.893 | 0 | 0 | 0 | 0 |

== Awards and honours ==
=== Milestones ===
Regular season
| Date | Player | Milestone |
|---|---|---|
| November 21, 2025 | Kiara Zanon | 1st career PWHL goal |
| November 21, 2025 | Kiara Zanon | 1st career PWHL game-winning goal |
| November 21, 2025 | Kiara Zanon | 1st career PWHL game |
| November 21, 2025 | Emma Maltais | 25th career PWHL assist |
| November 21, 2025 | Emma Gentry | 1st career PWHL game |
| November 21, 2025 | Sara Hjalmarsson | 1st career PWHL game |
| November 21, 2025 | Clara Van Wieren | 1st career PWHL game |
| November 29, 2025 | Emma Gentry | 1st career PWHL penalty |
| November 29, 2025 | Lauren Messier | 1st career PWHL game |
| December 4, 2025 | Anna Kjellbin | 5th career PWHL assist |
| December 7, 2025 | Emma Gentry | 1st career PWHL goal |
| December 7, 2025 | Sara Hjalmarsson | 1st career PWHL penalty |
| December 17, 2025 | Clara Van Wieren | 1st career PWHL assist |
| December 21, 2025 | Blayre Turnbull | 15th career PWHL goal |
| December 21, 2025 | Maggie Connors | 5th career PWHL assist |
| December 23, 2025 | Clara Van Wieren | 1st career PWHL penalty |
| December 27, 2025 | Blayre Turnbull | 15th career PWHL assist |
| December 27, 2025 | Kiara Zanon | 1st career PWHL assist |
| December 27, 2025 | Hanna Baskin | 1st career PWHL game |
| January 3, 2026 | Jessica Kondas | 1st career PWHL penalty |
| January 3, 2026 | Hanna Baskin | 1st career PWHL penalty |
| January 17, 2026 | Savannah Harmon | 5th career PWHL goal |
| January 20, 2026 | Jesse Compher | 15th career PWHL goal |
| January 20, 2026 | Emma Maltais | 30th career PWHL assist |
| January 20, 2026 | Savannah Harmon | 20th career PWHL assist |
| February 27, 2026 | Renata Fast | 10th career PWHL goal |
| February 27, 2026 | Sara Hjalmarsson | 1st career PWHL goal |
| February 27, 2026 | Natalie Spooner | 15th career PWHL assist |
| March 1, 2026 | Lauren Messier | 1st career PWHL goal |
| March 1, 2026 | Claire Dalton | 15th career PWHL assist |
| March 3, 2026 | Daryl Watts | 30th career PWHL assist |
| March 3, 2026 | Kiara Zanon | 1st career PWHL penalty |
| March 8, 2026 | Daryl Watts | 30th career PWHL goal |
| March 15, 2026 | Jesse Compher | 20th career PWHL assist |
| March 15, 2026 | Emma Gentry | 1st career PWHL assist |
| March 15, 2026 | Raygan Kirk | 1st career PWHL shutout |
| March 17, 2026 | Kali Flanagan | 15th career PWHL assist |
| March 27, 2026 | Kristin Della Rovere | 1st career PWHL penalty |
| March 29, 2026 | Blayre Turnbull | 20th career PWHL goal |
| April 1, 2026 | Blayre Turnbull | 20th career PWHL assist |
| April 15, 2026 | Renata Fast | 40th career PWHL assist |

=== Three Star Awards ===
==== Player of the Week ====
Player of the Week recipients
| Week | Player |
|---|---|
| December 22, 2025 | Jesse Compher |

==== Starting Six ====
The Starting Six is voted on each month by the Women's Chapter of the Professional Hockey Writers' Association (PHWA) and PWHL broadcast personnel. The following are Toronto Sceptres players who have been named to the Starting Six.

Starting Six players
| Month | Position | Player |
|---|---|---|
| December | F | Daryl Watts |

== Transactions ==
=== Draft ===
The 2025 PWHL Draft was held on June 24, 2025. Toronto made five draft picks, with St. Cloud State University forward Emma Gentry as the initial selection in the second round, 11th overall. She was followed by Kiara Zanon at 16, Clara Van Wieren at 23, Sara Hjalmarsson at 35, and Hanna Baskin at 43. They were originally assigned picks three, 19, and 27, but traded them to New York and Vancouver. They gained picks 16 and 23 in a trade with Vancouver.

Drafted prospect signings
| Date | Player | Draft | Term | Ref |
|---|---|---|---|---|
| August 12, 2025 | Emma Gentry | Second round, 11th overall (2025) | Two years | |
| November 20, 2025 | Kiara Zanon | Second round, 16th overall (2025) | One year | |
| November 20, 2025 | Clara Van Wieren | Third round, 23rd overall (2025) | One year | |
| November 20, 2025 | Sara Hjalmarsson | Fifth round, 35th overall (2025) | One year | |
| November 20, 2025 | Hanna Baskin | Sixth round, 43rd overall (2025) | Reserve player contract | |

=== Free agency ===
The free agency period began on June 16, 2025, at 9:00 am ET, with a pause between June 27 and July 8.

Free agent signings
| Date | Player | Previous team | Term | Ref |
|---|---|---|---|---|
| June 17, 2025 | Elaine Chuli | Montreal Victoire | One year | |
| June 17, 2025 | Claire Dalton | Montreal Victoire | One year | |
| June 23, 2025 | Clair DeGeorge | Montreal Victoire | One year | |
| November 20, 2025 | Jessie McPherson | Minnesota State University (WCHA) | Two years | |
| November 20, 2025 | Kristin Della Rovere | EVB Eagles Südtirol (EWHL/IHLW) | Reserve player contract | |
| November 20, 2025 | Lauren Messier | Dartmouth College (ECAC) | Reserve player contract | |
| March 28, 2026 | Anneke Rankila | SDE Hockey (SDHL) | Reserve player contract | |

=== Contract extensions/terminations ===
Player contract extensions
| Date | Player | Term | Ref |
|---|---|---|---|
| June 17, 2025 | Natalie Spooner | Two years | |
| June 17, 2025 | Jesse Compher | Two years | |
| June 18, 2025 | Maggie Connors | One year | |
| June 19, 2025 | Kali Flanagan | One year | |
| June 20, 2025 | Jessica Kondas | One year | |
| July 23, 2025 | Anna Kjellbin | Two years | |
| November 19, 2025 | Ella Shelton | One year (Note: Extension will come into effect for the 2026–27 season.) | |

=== Trades ===
Trades involving the Sceptres
| Date | Details | | Ref |
|---|---|---|---|
| June 24, 2025 | To New York Sirens First round pick – 2025 PWHL Draft (#3 – Casey O'Brien); Fourth round pick – 2025 PWHL Draft (#27 – Maddi Wheeler) | To Toronto Sceptres Ella Shelton | |
| June 24, 2025 | To PWHL Vancouver Kristen Campbell; Third round pick – 2025 PWHL Draft (#19 – Nina Jobst-Smith) | To Toronto Sceptres Second round pick – 2025 PWHL Draft (#16 – Kiara Zanon); Third round pick – 2025 PWHL Draft (#23 – Clara Van Wieren) | |
| March 17, 2026 | To New York Sirens Clair DeGeorge | To Toronto Sceptres Future considerations | |

=== Reserve activations ===
Reserve player activations
| Date | Activated player | Absent player | Notes | Ref |
|---|---|---|---|---|
| November 29, 2025 | Lauren Messier | Daryl Watts | 10 day contract | |
| December 27, 2025 | Hanna Baskin | Allie Munroe | 10 day contract | |
| January 2, 2026 | Hanna Baskin | Allie Munroe | LTIR | |
| February 27, 2026 | Lauren Messier | Emma Gentry | 10 day contract | |
| March 18, 2026 | Kristin Della Rovere | Clair DeGeorge | Player traded | |
