= 2025–26 PWHL season =

- League: Professional Women's Hockey League
- Sport: Ice hockey
- Duration: November 21, 2025 – April 25, 2026
- Games: 30 per team
- Teams: 8
- TV partner(s): CBC/Radio-Canada, TSN/RDS, Sportsnet, Prime Video, NESN, FDSN North, MSG, KZJO

Draft
- Top draft pick: Kristýna Kaltounková
- Picked by: New York Sirens

Regular season
- Season champions: Montreal Victoire
- Season MVP: Aerin Frankel (Boston Fleet)
- Top scorer: Kelly Pannek (Minnesota Frost)

Playoffs
- Playoffs MVP: Marie-Philip Poulin (Victoire)

Walter Cup
- Champions: Montreal Victoire
- Runners-up: Ottawa Charge

PWHL seasons
- ← 2024–25 2026–27 →

The 2025–26 PWHL season was the third season of operation of the Professional Women's Hockey League. The league expanded to eight teams with the addition of the Seattle Torrent and the Vancouver Goldeneyes. The regular season began on November 21, 2025. The Walter Cup playoffs began on April 30 and ended on May 20, 2026, with the Montreal Victoire winning their first Walter Cup.

== League business ==
- On April 15, 2025, the PWHL announced that the 2025 PWHL Draft would be held June 24 at the Hard Rock Hotel & Casino in Ottawa.
- On April 23, 2025, the PWHL announced that their seventh team and first expansion franchise would be located in Vancouver, and begin play in the 2025–26 season. The Vancouver Goldeneyes would play their home games out of the Pacific Coliseum, which was the home arena of the NHL's Vancouver Canucks from 1970 to 1995.
- On April 30, 2025, the PWHL announced that their eighth team and second expansion franchise would be located in Seattle, and begin play in the 2025–26 season. The Seattle Torrent would play their home games out of Climate Pledge Arena, which is the home arena of the NHL's Seattle Kraken and the WNBA's Seattle Storm.

=== Front office changes ===
Front office changes
Off–season
Team	Previous general manager	New general manager	Notes
Seattle Torrent	—N/a	Meghan Turner	On May 21, 2025, the PWHL named Meghan Turner as general manager for the Seattle team. She was previously an assistant general manager for the Boston Fleet.
Vancouver Goldeneyes	—N/a	Cara Gardner Morey	On May 23, 2025, PWHL Vancouver announced that Cara Gardner Morey would be appointed as the club's first general manager.

=== Coaching changes ===
Coaching changes
Off–season
Team	Previous head coach	New head coach	Notes
Seattle Torrent	—N/a	Steve O'Rourke	On June 20, 2025, PWHL Seattle named O'Rourke their first head coach. He most recently served as the head coach for the Oshawa Generals of the Ontario Hockey League.
Vancouver Goldeneyes	—N/a	Brian Idalski	On June 23, 2025, PWHL Vancouver named Idalski as their first head coach. He most recently served as head coach for the St. Cloud State Huskies women's ice hockey program in the NCAA, and coached the China women's national ice hockey team at the 2022 Winter Olympics.
Boston Fleet	Courtney Birchard-Kessel	Kris Sparre	On June 23, 2025, Kessel was named head coach of the NCAA's Princeton Tigers women's ice hockey program, stepping away from the Fleet. She previously served as an assistant coach for the Tigers under Cara Morey, who relinquished her role to become the inaugural general manager of PWHL Vancouver. On July 23, Sparre was named by the Fleet as their new head coach. He most recently served as an assistant coach for the San Diego Gulls, the American Hockey League affiliate of the NHL's Anaheim Ducks.

== Preseason ==
=== Preseason schedule ===
The PWHL preseason schedule was announced on October 8, 2025. Preseason camps were held in New Jersey, Montreal, Vancouver, and Ottawa. Each camp hosted two teams, each playing two games.

All times in Eastern Time.

Game log
Pre-season camp

Date	Time	Visitor	Score	Home	OT	Notes	Box score/recap
November 13	3:00	Minnesota	5–2	New York		@ Codey Arena	
November 14	12:00	Minnesota	2–6	New York		@ Codey Arena	
November 15	7:30	Boston	2–3	Montreal	OT	@ Verdun Auditorium	
November 15	10:00	Seattle	0–3	Vancouver		@ Pacific Coliseum	
November 16	1:00	Toronto	3–2	Ottawa	OT	@ TD Place Arena	
November 16	8:00	Seattle	4–2	Vancouver		@ Pacific Coliseum	
November 17	1:00	Toronto	3–0	Ottawa		@ TD Place Arena	
November 17	2:00	Boston	2–3	Montreal		@ Verdun Auditorium	

== Regular season ==
=== Standings ===
Pos	Team	Pld	W	OTW	OTL	L	GF	GA	GD	Pts	Qualification
1	Montreal Victoire (Y)	30	16	6	2	6	78	41	+37	62 (Note: Greater number of games won, excluding games won by Shootout: Montreal 19, Boston 18)	Playoffs
2	Boston Fleet	30	16	5	4	5	74	45	+29	62	Playoffs
3	Minnesota Frost	30	13	3	5	9	91	73	+18	50	Playoffs
4	Ottawa Charge	30	9	8	1	12	71	73	−2	44	Playoffs
5	Toronto Sceptres	30	10	1	6	13	51	72	−21	38	
6	Vancouver Goldeneyes	30	9	3	4	14	68	81	−13	37	
7	New York Sirens	30	9	3	3	15	63	83	−20	36	
8	Seattle Torrent	30	8	1	5	16	64	92	−28	31	

Updated to match(es) played on April 25, 2026. Source: PWHL
(Y) Regular season winner

=== Schedule ===
The regular season schedule was announced on October 1, 2025. The season began on November 21, 2025 and ended on April 25, 2026 with each team playing 30 games.

All times in Eastern Time.

Game log
November

Date	Time	Visitor	Score	Home	OT	Notes	Box score/recap
November 21	7:00	Toronto	2–1	Minnesota			
November 21	10:00	Seattle	3–4	Vancouver	OT		
November 22	7:00	New York	4–0	Ottawa		Kayle Osborne recorded shutout (1); Taylor Girard recorded hat-trick (1)	
November 23	1:00	Montreal	0–2	Boston		Aerin Frankel recorded shutout (1)	
November 25	7:00	New York	0–4	Montreal		Ann-Renée Desbiens recorded shutout (1)	
November 26	7:00	Vancouver	1–5	Ottawa			
November 28	4:00	Minnesota	3–0	Seattle		Nicole Hensley recorded shutout (1); New US attendance record: 16,014	
November 29	12:00	Vancouver	1–5	New York			
November 29	2:00	Boston	3–1	Toronto			

December

Date	Time	Visitor	Score	Home	OT	Notes	Box score/recap
December 2	7:00	Minnesota	5–1	Ottawa		Kendall Coyne Schofield recorded hat-trick (1)	
December 3	7:00	Vancouver	0–2	Boston		Aerin Frankel recorded shutout (2)	
December 3	10:00	New York	1–2	Seattle			
December 4	7:00	Ottawa	1–3	Toronto			
December 6	3:00	New York	0–4	Vancouver		Emerance Maschmeyer recorded shutout (1)	
December 7	12:00	Toronto	1–3	Montreal			
December 7	3:00	Minnesota	1–4	Boston			
December 16	10:00	Ottawa	1–2	Vancouver			
December 17	7:00	Boston	2–0	New York		Aerin Frankel recorded shutout (3)	
December 17	7:30	Montreal	2–1	Toronto	SO	@ Scotiabank Centre	
December 17	10:00	Ottawa	1–4	Seattle			
December 19	8:00	Boston	2–5	Minnesota			
December 20	3:00	Montreal	4–2	Vancouver			
December 21	12:00	Toronto	4–3	New York			
December 21	2:00	Ottawa	3–2	Minnesota	OT	@ Allstate Arena	
December 21	5:00	Boston	3–1	Seattle			
December 23	7:00	Ottawa	4–3	Toronto	OT		
December 23	10:00	Montreal	1–2	Seattle			
December 27	12:00	Boston	2–3	Ottawa	SO		
December 27	2:00	Toronto	2–1	Montreal		@ Bell Centre	
December 27	3:00	Minnesota	2–1	Vancouver	OT	@ Rogers Place	
December 28	6:00	Seattle	3–4	New York		@ American Airlines Center; Casey O'Brien recorded hat-trick (1)	
December 30	7:00	Minnesota	5–1	Toronto			
December 31	1:00	Vancouver	0–2	New York		Kayle Osborne recorded shutout (2)	

January

Date	Time	Visitor	Score	Home	OT	Notes	Box score/recap
January 2	1:00	Montreal	3–4	New York			
January 3	1:00	Minnesota	2–5	Ottawa			
January 3	2:00	Seattle	3–2	Toronto	SO	@ TD Coliseum	
January 3	7:00	Vancouver	4–3	Boston		@ Little Caesars Arena	
January 4	2:00	Minnesota	2–3	Montreal	OT		
January 6	7:00	New York	2–0	Toronto		Kayle Osborne recorded shutout (3)	
January 7	7:00	Seattle	1–2	Boston			
January 9	7:00	Vancouver	2–4	Ottawa			
January 11	1:00	Ottawa	2–1	Boston	SO	@ Scotiabank Centre	
January 11	2:00	Vancouver	0–1	Montreal		@ Videotron Centre; Ann-Renée Desbiens recorded shutout (2)	
January 11	2:00	Seattle	2–6	Minnesota			
January 13	7:00	Ottawa	1–2	Montreal			
January 14	7:00	Toronto	1–2	Boston			
January 16	7:00	Minnesota	3–2	New York	OT		
January 17	3:00	Vancouver	1–2	Toronto	OT	@ Scotiabank Arena	
January 18	2:00	Montreal	1–2	New York		@ Capital One Arena; New US attendance record: 17,228	
January 18	10:00	Boston	2–1	Seattle	SO		
January 20	7:00	Ottawa	4–3	New York	OT		
January 20	10:00	Toronto	4–6	Seattle			
January 21	7:00	Montreal	2–1	Minnesota	OT		
January 22	10:00	Toronto	0–5	Vancouver		Kristen Campbell recorded shutout (1)	
January 24	2:00	Ottawa	1–3	Montreal			
January 25	3:00	New York	2–6	Minnesota			
January 25	6:00	Vancouver	3–1	Seattle		@ Ball Arena	
January 28	6:30	Toronto	0–3	Montreal		Ann-Renée Desbiens recorded shutout (3)	
January 28	7:00	New York	3–4	Boston	SO		
January 28	7:00	Seattle	2–4	Ottawa			
January 28	9:00	Vancouver	1–4	Minnesota			

February

Date	Time	Visitor	Score	Home	OT	Notes	Box score/recap
February 26	7:00	Montreal	4–1	New York			
February 27	10:00	Toronto	5–2	Seattle		New US attendance record: 17,335	
February 28	2:00	Boston	3–2	Ottawa	SO		

March

Date	Time	Visitor	Score	Home	OT	Notes	Box score/recap
March 1	1:00	Minnesota	0–4	Montreal		Ann-Renée Desbiens recorded shutout (4)	
March 1	4:00	Toronto	2–1	Vancouver			
March 3	7:00	Montreal	4–3	Toronto	SO		
March 4	7:00	Seattle	3–4	Ottawa			
March 5	7:00	Boston	1–0	New York		Aerin Frankel recorded shutout (4)	
March 8	12:00	Minnesota	3–2	Toronto	OT		
March 8	12:00	Ottawa	2–6	New York			
March 10	10:00	Boston	2–1	Vancouver	OT		
March 11	10:00	Boston	2–3	Seattle			
March 13	8:00	Seattle	1–4	Minnesota			
March 14	3:00	Ottawa	3–2	Vancouver	OT		
March 15	1:00	Seattle	0–2	Toronto		Raygan Kirk recorded shutout (1)	
March 15	1:00	Boston	4–3	Montreal	OT		
March 15	4:00	New York	3–4	Minnesota		@ Ball Arena	
March 17	7:00	Toronto	2–0	Boston		Raygan Kirk recorded shutout (2)	
March 18	7:00	Ottawa	0–5	Minnesota		Maddie Rooney recorded shutout (1)	
March 18	10:00	New York	2–5	Vancouver			
March 19	7:00	Seattle	1–4	Montreal			
March 21	3:00	Minnesota	3–1	Vancouver			
March 21	4:00	Seattle	0–3	Boston		Aerin Frankel recorded shutout (5)	
March 22	7:00	Montreal	1–2	Ottawa	OT	@ Canada Life Centre	
March 24	7:00	Vancouver	0–2	Boston		Aerin Frankel recorded shutout (6)	
March 25	7:00	Montreal	3–0	Minnesota		Ann-Renée Desbiens recorded shutout (5)	
March 25	8:00	New York	1–4	Seattle		@ Allstate Arena	
March 27	7:00	Boston	4–0	Toronto		Aerin Frankel recorded shutout (7)	
March 28	1:00	New York	1–3	Montreal		@ Little Caesars Arena	
March 29	1:00	Vancouver	3–2	Toronto			
March 29	4:00	Boston	4–2	Minnesota		Boston clinched playoff spot	
March 29	7:00	Ottawa	2–0	Seattle		Gwyneth Philips recorded shutout (1)	

April

Date	Time	Visitor	Score	Home	OT	Notes	Box score/recap
April 1	7:00	Vancouver	0–3	Montreal		Ann-Renée Desbiens recorded shutout (6); Montreal clinched playoff spot	
April 1	7:00	Minnesota	3–4	New York	OT	Sarah Fillier recorded hat-trick (1)	
April 1	9:30	Toronto	2–1	Ottawa		@ Scotiabank Saddledome	
April 3	7:00	Montreal	3–0	Ottawa		@ Canadian Tire Centre	
April 4	2:00	Vancouver	5–6	Minnesota		Minnesota clinched playoff spot	
April 4	8:00	Seattle	1–2	New York	SO	@ Madison Square Garden; New US attendance record: 18,006	
April 7	7:00	Seattle	1–4	Montreal			
April 7	9:30	Boston	5–1	Vancouver		@ Rogers Place	
April 8	7:00	Seattle	5–3	Ottawa			
April 11	1:00	New York	1–4	Minnesota			
April 11	2:00	Ottawa	2–0	Toronto		Gwyneth Philips recorded shutout (2)	
April 11	7:00	Montreal	1–0	Boston		@ TD Garden; Ann-Renée Desbiens recorded shutout (7)	
April 14	10:00	Seattle	1–4	Vancouver		Seattle eliminated from playoffs	
April 15	7:00	Toronto	2–3	New York			
April 15	7:00	Minnesota	2–3	Boston			
April 17	7:00	Boston	2–3	Montreal	OT		
April 18	2:00	New York	1–5	Ottawa			
April 18	5:00	Vancouver	6–5	Seattle	OT	Vancouver eliminated from playoffs	
April 19	1:30	Toronto	2–0	Minnesota		Raygan Kirk recorded shutout (3)	
April 21	7:00	New York	1–0	Toronto	OT	Kayle Osborne recorded shutout (4); New York eliminated from playoffs	
April 21	10:00	Montreal	3–4	Vancouver		Hayley Scamurra recorded hat-trick (1)	
April 22	7:00	Ottawa	2–1	Boston	OT		
April 22	10:00	Minnesota	4–5	Seattle			
April 25	2:00	Toronto	0–3	Ottawa		Gwyneth Philips recorded shutout (3); Ottawa clinched playoff spot Toronto eliminated from playoffs	
April 25	12:00	New York	0–4	Boston		Aerin Frankel recorded shutout (8)	
April 25	7:00	Minnesota	3–4	Vancouver	OT		
April 25	10:00	Montreal	2–1	Seattle	SO	Montreal clinched first place	

=== Statistics ===
==== Scoring leaders ====
The following players led the league in regular season points at the conclusion of the regular season.

Note: GP = Games played; G = Goals; A = Assists; Pts = Points; PIM = Penalty minutes;

Player	Team	GP	G	A	Pts	+/–	PIM
Kelly Pannek	Minnesota	30	16	17	33	+13	6
Taylor Heise	Minnesota	30	13	17	30	+18	12
Britta Curl-Salemme	Minnesota	30	11	18	29	+7	22
Brianne Jenner	Ottawa	30	12	14	26	+2	8
Rebecca Leslie	Ottawa	30	14	9	23	+2	10
Jessie Eldridge	Seattle / Boston	30	14	9	23	-1	4
Grace Zumwinkle	Minnesota	29	13	10	23	+5	6
Kendall Coyne Schofield	Minnesota	23	12	11	23	+22	0
Sarah Fillier	New York	29	9	14	23	-5	14
Abby Roque	Montreal	29	8	14	22	+10	31
Casey O'Brien	New York	28	7	15	22	-7	2
Megan Keller	Boston	30	7	15	22	+10	8
Laura Stacey	Montreal	30	7	15	22	+16	12

==== Leading goaltenders ====
The following goaltenders led the league in regular season goals against average at the conclusion of the regular season.

Minimum 240 minutes

Note: GP = Games played; Min, TOI = Minutes played; W = Wins; L = Losses; OTL = Overtime losses; GA = Goals-against; GAA = Goals-against average; SO = Shutouts; SV% = Save percentage;

Player	Team	GP	TOI	W	L	OTL	GA	SO	SV%	GAA
Ann-Renée Desbiens	Montreal	25	1509:26	19	4	2	28	7	.955	1.11
Aerin Frankel	Boston	26	1583:12	19	4	3	31	8	.953	1.17
Raygan Kirk	Toronto	23	1349:09	8	8	6	42	3	.934	1.88
Maddie Rooney	Minnesota	16	971:39	9	5	2	33	1	.921	2.04
Gwyneth Philips	Ottawa	28	1643:15	16	11	1	58	3	.931	2.12

=== Attendance ===
At the conclusion of the regular season

Home team	Home games	Average attendance	Total attendance
Seattle	13	12,875	167,381
Vancouver	13	11,235	146,051
Montreal	13	9,950	129,353
Toronto	13	9,109	118,411
Minnesota	13	8,143	105,857
Ottawa	13	8,131	105,698
Boston	13	5,991	77,884
New York	13	5,095	66,230
Neutral sites	16	12,477	199,631
League	120	9,304	1,116,496

=== Supplemental discipline ===
==== Suspensions ====
Date of incident	Offender	Team	Offense	Length
December 28, 2025	Aneta Tejralová	Seattle Torrent	Illegal check to the head of Sarah Fillier.	2 games
January 13, 2026	Abby Roque	Montreal Victoire	Illegal check to the head of Abby Boreen.	1 game
January 19, 2026	Taylor Girard	New York Sirens	Leaving the bench to join a fight against the Montreal Victoire.	4 games
March 18, 2026	Peyton Anderson	Minnesota Frost	Illegal check to the head of Paetyn Levis.	1 game
March 27, 2026	Clara Van Wieren	Toronto Sceptres	Boarding against Sophie Shirley.	1 game
April 5, 2026	Emmy Fecteau	New York Sirens	Illegal check to the head of Mikyla Grant-Mentis.	1 game
April 11, 2026	Micah Zandee-Hart	New York Sirens	Illegal check to the head of Katy Knoll.	1 game
Total:				11 games

==== Fines ====
Date of incident	Offender	Team	Offense	Amount
November 25, 2025	Micah Zandee-Hart	New York Sirens	Cross-checking against Gabbie Hughes.	$250.00
March 18, 2026	Britta Curl-Salemme	Minnesota Frost	Cross-checking against the New York Sirens.	$250.00
March 18, 2026	Maggie Flaherty	Montreal Victoire	Illegal body check against the Boston Fleet.	$250.00
March 18, 2026	Loren Gabel	Boston Fleet	Interference while on the bench.	$250.00
March 22, 2026	Rebecca Leslie	Ottawa Charge	Boarding against Amanda Boulier.	$500.00
March 27, 2026	Rylind MacKinnon	Boston Fleet	Cross-checking against Clara Van Wieren.	$500.00
April 11, 2026	Ella Huber	Boston Fleet	Cross-checking against Hayley Scamurra.	$250.00
Total:				$2,250.00

== Playoffs ==
=== Bracket ===
In each round, teams compete in a best-of-five series following a 2–2–1 format. The team with home ice advantage plays at home for games one and two (and game five, if necessary), and the other team is at home for games three and four. The top four teams make the playoffs.

In the first round, by virtue of finishing first in the regular season standings, the Montreal Victoire have earned the right to choose their first round opponent.

Semi-finals
April 30–May 10, Tsongas Center and Canadian Tire Centre
Boston Fleet	2	1	1	3	–
Ottawa Charge	1	3	2	4**	–
May 2–12, Place Bell and Grand Casino Arena
Montreal Victoire	4	1***	2	1	2
Minnesota Frost	5*	0	1	3	1

Finals
May 14–20, Place Bell and Canadian Tire Centre
Ottawa Charge	2	1	2	0	–
Montreal Victoire	3*	2*	1	4	–

* - Denotes overtime period(s)

== Transactions ==
=== Draft ===
The 2025 PWHL Draft was held on June 24, 2025. Colgate University forward Kristýna Kaltounková was selected first overall by the New York Sirens, becoming the highest drafted player from the Czech Republic and the first European to be granted the top pick.

Due to the additions of the Vancouver and Seattle teams, an expansion draft was held on June 9, 2025.

Drafted prospect signings
Date	Player	Team	Draft	Term	Ref
July 9, 2025	Kendall Cooper	Minnesota Frost	First round, sixth overall (2025)	Two years	
July 11, 2025	Sarah Wozniewicz	Ottawa Charge	Third round, 21st overall (2025)	One year	
July 14, 2025	Anna Shokhina	Ottawa Charge	Second round, 13th overall (2025)	One year	
July 14, 2025	Sanni Ahola	Ottawa Charge	Fifth round, 37th overall (2025)	One year	
July 14, 2025	Fanuza Kadirova	Ottawa Charge	Sixth round, 45th overall (2025)	One year	
July 15, 2025	Jenna Buglioni	Seattle Torrent	First round, eighth overall (2025)	Two years	
July 16, 2025	Hannah Murphy	Seattle Torrent	Second round, 15th overall (2025)	Two years	
July 17, 2025	Abby Hustler	Minnesota Frost	Second round, 14th overall (2025)	Two years	
July 25, 2025	Rory Guilday	Ottawa Charge	First round, fifth overall (2025)	Three years	
July 29, 2025	Anna Segedi	Minnesota Frost	Third round, 22nd overall (2025)	Two years	
August 12, 2025	Emma Gentry	Toronto Sceptres	Second round, 11th overall (2025)	Two years	
August 13, 2025	Ella Huber	Boston Fleet	Second round, 10th overall (2025)	Two years	
August 20, 2025	Haley Winn	Boston Fleet	First round, second overall (2025)	Three years	
September 8, 2025	Kristýna Kaltounková	New York Sirens	First round, first overall (2025)	Three years	
September 12, 2025	Anne Cherkowski	New York Sirens	Second round, 13th overall (2025)	Three years	
October 6, 2025	Dayle Ross	New York Sirens	Fourth round, 25th overall (2025)	One year	
October 6, 2025	Michelle Karvinen	Vancouver Goldeneyes	First round, Seventh overall (2025)	One year	
October 10, 2025	Nicole Gosling	Montreal Victoire	First round, Fourth overall (2025)	Three years	
October 22, 2025	Callie Shanahan	New York Sirens	Fourth round, 28th overall (2025)	One year	
October 28, 2025	Nina Jobst-Smith	Vancouver Goldeneyes	Third round, 19th overall (2025)	Two years	
October 28, 2025	Brianna Brooks	Vancouver Goldeneyes	Fourth round, 32nd overall (2025)	One year	
October 28, 2025	Madison Samoskevich	Vancouver Goldeneyes	Fifth round, 39th overall (2025)	One year	
November 18, 2025	Casey O'Brien	New York Sirens	First round, 3rd overall (2025)	One year	
November 18, 2025	Maddi Wheeler	New York Sirens	Fourth round, 27th overall (2025)	One year	
November 18, 2025	Anna Bargman	New York Sirens	Fifth round, 33rd overall (2025)	One year	
November 18, 2025	Kaley Doyle	New York Sirens	Sixth round, 41st overall (2025)	One year	
November 20, 2025	Natálie Mlýnková	Montreal Victoire	Second round, 12th overall (2025)	One year	
November 20, 2025	Skylar Irving	Montreal Victoire	Third round, 20th overall (2025)	One year	
November 20, 2025	Tamara Giaquinto	Montreal Victoire	Sixth round, 44th overall (2025)	Reserve player contract	
November 20, 2025	Maya Labad	Montreal Victoire	Fifth round, 36th overall (2025)	Reserve player contract	
November 20, 2025	Kiara Zanon	Toronto Sceptres	Second round, 16th overall (2025)	One year	
November 20, 2025	Clara Van Wieren	Toronto Sceptres	Third round, 23rd overall (2025)	One year	
November 20, 2025	Sara Hjalmarsson	Toronto Sceptres	Fifth round, 35th overall (2025)	One year	
November 20, 2025	Hanna Baskin	Toronto Sceptres	Sixth round, 43rd overall (2025)	Reserve player contract	
November 20, 2025	Peyton Hemp	Ottawa Charge	Fourth round, 29th overall (2025)	One year	
November 20, 2025	Olivia Wallin	Ottawa Charge	Sixth round, 47th overall (2025)	Reserve player contract	
November 20, 2025	Lily Delianedis	Seattle Torrent	Third round, 24th overall (2025)	One year	
November 20, 2025	Lyndie Lobdell	Seattle Torrent	Fifth round, 40th overall (2025)	One year	
November 20, 2025	Jada Habisch	Seattle Torrent	Fourth round, 31st overall (2025)	Reserve player contract	
November 20, 2025	Vanessa Upson	Minnesota Frost	Fifth round, 38th overall (2025)	One year	
November 20, 2025	Brooke Becker	Minnesota Frost	Sixth round, 46th overall (2025)	One year	
November 20, 2025	Ava Rinker	Minnesota Frost	Fourth round, 30th overall (2025)	Reserve player contract	
November 20, 2025	Olivia Mobley	Boston Fleet	Third round, 18th overall (2025)	One year	
November 20, 2025	Riley Brengman	Boston Fleet	Fourth round, 26th overall (2025)	One year	
November 20, 2025	Abby Newhook	Boston Fleet	Fifth round, 34th overall (2025)	One year	
November 20, 2025	Amanda Thiele	Boston Fleet	Sixth round, 42nd overall (2025)	One year	

=== Free agency ===
The free agency period began on June 16, 2025 at 9:00 am ET, with a pause between June 27 and July 8. Prior to the start of the free agency period, there was an exclusive signing window from June 4–8 for the Seattle and Vancouver expansion teams.

Free agent signings
Date	Player	New team	Previous team	Term	Ref
June 4, 2025 (Note: Expansion team exclusive signing window.)	Claire Thompson	Vancouver Goldeneyes	Minnesota Frost	One year	
June 4, 2025	Sophie Jaques	Vancouver Goldeneyes	Minnesota Frost	Three years	
June 5, 2025	Hilary Knight	Seattle Torrent	Boston Fleet	One year	
June 5, 2025	Emerance Maschmeyer	Vancouver Goldeneyes	Ottawa Charge	Two years	
June 5, 2025	Danielle Serdachny	Seattle Torrent	Ottawa Charge	Two years	
June 5, 2025	Cayla Barnes	Seattle Torrent	Montreal Victoire	Three years	
June 5, 2025	Sarah Nurse	Vancouver Goldeneyes	Toronto Sceptres	One year	
June 5, 2025	Jennifer Gardiner	Vancouver Goldeneyes	Montreal Victoire	One year	
June 6, 2025	Alex Carpenter	Seattle Torrent	New York Sirens	One year	
June 6, 2025	Corinne Schroeder	Seattle Torrent	New York Sirens	Two years	
June 16, 2025	Hannah Miller	Vancouver Goldeneyes	Toronto Sceptres	Three years	
June 17, 2025	Michela Cava	Vancouver Goldeneyes	Minnesota Frost	Two years	
June 17, 2025	Tereza Vanišová	Vancouver Goldeneyes	Ottawa Charge	Two years	
June 17, 2025	Elaine Chuli	Toronto Sceptres	Montreal Victoire	One year	
June 17, 2025	Claire Dalton	Toronto Sceptres	Montreal Victoire	One year	
June 17, 2025	Shiann Darkangelo	Montreal Victoire	Ottawa Charge	Two years	
June 17, 2025	Mariah Keopple	Seattle Torrent	Montreal Victoire	One year	
June 17, 2025	Mellissa Channell-Watkins	Vancouver Goldeneyes	Minnesota Frost	One year	
June 17, 2025	Emma Greco	Vancouver Goldeneyes	Boston Fleet	Two years	
June 17, 2025	Hayley Scamurra	Montreal Victoire	Toronto Sceptres	Two years	
June 17, 2025	Lexie Adzija	Seattle Torrent	Boston Fleet	Two years	
June 18, 2025	Natalie Snodgrass	Seattle Torrent	Ottawa Charge	One year	
June 18, 2025	Jincy Roese	New York Sirens	Ottawa Charge	One year	
June 18, 2025	Chloé Aurard	Boston Fleet	New York Sirens	One year	
June 18, 2025	Liz Schepers	Boston Fleet	Minnesota Frost	Two years	
June 19, 2025	Élizabeth Giguère	Ottawa Charge	New York Sirens	One year	
June 19, 2025	Jessica DiGirolamo	Montreal Victoire	Boston Fleet	Two years	
June 20, 2025	Mikyla Grant-Mentis	Seattle Torrent	Montreal Victoire	Two years	
June 20, 2025	Maggie Flaherty	Montreal Victoire	Minnesota Frost	One year	
June 20, 2025	Zoe Boyd	Boston Fleet	Ottawa Charge	One year	
June 20, 2025	Rylind MacKinnon	Boston Fleet	Toronto Sceptres	One year	
June 20, 2025	Abbey Levy	Boston Fleet	New York Sirens	One year	
June 20, 2025	Sidney Morin	Minnesota Frost	Boston Fleet	Two years	
June 20, 2025	Jade Downie-Landry	Montreal Victoire	New York Sirens	One year	
June 20, 2025	Gabby Rosenthal	Vancouver Goldeneyes (Note: Restricted free agent selected in expansion draft.)	New York Sirens	One year	
June 20, 2025	Brooke Hobson	Ottawa Charge	New York Sirens	One year	
June 20, 2025	Laura Kluge	Boston Fleet	Toronto Sceptres	One year	
June 21, 2025	Savannah Norcross	New York Sirens	Luleå HF (SDHL)	One year	
June 21, 2025	Emma Bergesen	Ottawa Charge	SDE Hockey (SDHL)	One year	
June 23, 2025	Clair DeGeorge	Toronto Sceptres	Montreal Victoire	One year	
July 9, 2025	Carly Jackson	Seattle Torrent	Toronto Sceptres	One year	
July 10, 2025	Anna Wilgren	Seattle Torrent	Montreal Victoire	One year	
July 11, 2025	Brooke McQuigge	Vancouver Goldeneyes	Minnesota Frost	One year	
November 20, 2025	Megan Warrener	Montreal Victoire	University of Connecticut (HE)	One year	
November 20, 2025	Claire Vekich	Montreal Victoire	Minnesota State University (WCHA)	Reserve player contract	
November 20, 2025	Jessie McPherson	Toronto Sceptres	Minnesota State University (WCHA)	Two years	
November 20, 2025	Kristin Della Rovere	Toronto Sceptres	EVB Eagles Südtirol (EWHL/IHLW)	Reserve player contract	
November 20, 2025	Lauren Messier	Toronto Sceptres	Dartmouth College (ECAC)	Reserve player contract	
November 20, 2025	Katie Chan	Vancouver Goldeneyes	Färjestad BK (SDHL)	One year	
November 20, 2025	Kimberly Newell	Vancouver Goldeneyes	KRS Vanke Rays (ZhHL)	One year	
November 20, 2025	Brianna Brooks	Vancouver Goldeneyes	Vancouver Goldeneyes (Note: Initially signed to a one year standard player agreement that was terminated after being cut from training camp.)	Reserve player contract	
November 20, 2025	Darcie Lappan	Vancouver Goldeneyes	MoDo Hockey (SDHL)	Reserve player contract (Note: Subsequently signed a standard player agreement following training camp to fill in for Nina Jobst-Smith who is on LTIR. Length of contract has not been specified.)	
November 20, 2025	Malia Schneider	Vancouver Goldeneyes	SDE Hockey (SDHL)	Reserve player contract	
November 20, 2025	Kate Reilly	Ottawa Charge	Quinnipiac University (ECAC)	One year	
November 20, 2025	Kendra Woodland	Ottawa Charge	University of New Brunswick (AUS)	One year	
November 20, 2025	Vita Poniatovskaia	Ottawa Charge	Yale University (ECAC)	Reserve player contract	
November 20, 2025	Brooke Bryant	Seattle Torrent	Minnesota Frost	One year	
November 20, 2025	Marah Wagner	Seattle Torrent	Skellefteå AIK (SDHL)	One year	
November 20, 2025	Sydney Langseth	Seattle Torrent	Minnesota State University (WCHA)	Reserve player contract	
November 20, 2025	Emily Zumwinkle	Seattle Torrent	Ohio State University (WCHA)	Reserve player contract	
November 20, 2025	Madison Bizal	Minnesota Frost	SDE Hockey (SDHL)	One year	
November 20, 2025	Peyton Anderson	Minnesota Frost	Northeastern University (HE)	One year	
November 20, 2025	Élizabeth Giguère	Minnesota Frost	Ottawa Charge	Reserve player contract	
November 20, 2025	Loren Gabel	Boston Fleet	Boston Fleet (Note: Initially signed to a one year contract extension that was terminated and replaced with a reserve player contract.)	Reserve player contract	
November 20, 2025	Mia Biotti	Boston Fleet	Harvard University (ECAC)	Reserve player contract	
November 20, 2025	Nicole Vallario	New York Sirens	EV Zug Women's Team (SWHL A)	Reserve player contract (Note: Signed a standard player agreement following training camp to fill in for Dayle Ross who is on LTIR. Length of contract has not been specified.)	
November 24, 2025	Reece Hunt	Ottawa Charge	Luleå HF (SDHL)	Reserve player contract	
January 6, 2026	Sarah Coe	Ottawa Charge	Rochester Institute of Technology (AHA)	Reserve player contract	
February 3, 2026	Maggy Burbidge	Ottawa Charge	HC Fribourg-Gottéron Ladies (SWHL A)	Reserve player contract	
March 13, 2026	Kaitlyn Ross	Ottawa Charge	Mount Royal University (CW)	Reserve player contract (Note: To be released at the conclusion of 10 day contract.)	
March 22, 2026	Gabrielle David	Seattle Torrent	SDE Hockey (SDHL)	Reserve player contract	
March 24, 2026	Samantha Isbell	Montreal Victoire	Ottawa Charge	Reserve player contract	
March 24, 2026	Nadia Mattivi	Montreal Victoire	Luleå HF (SDHL)	Reserve player contract	
March 26, 2026	Sam Cogan	Minnesota Frost	SDE Hockey (SDHL)	Reserve player contract	
March 27, 2026	Alexie Guay	Ottawa Charge	Färjestad BK (SDHL)	Reserve player contract	
March 28, 2026	Anneke Rankila	Toronto Sceptres	SDE Hockey (SDHL)	Reserve player contract	
March 30, 2026	Sini Karjalainen	Vancouver Goldeneyes	Skellefteå AIK (SDHL)	Reserve player contract	
March 31, 2026	Noemi Neubauerová	Boston Fleet	EV Zug Women's Team (SWHL A)	Reserve player contract	
March 31, 2026	Sarah Bujold	New York Sirens	Luleå HF (SDHL)	Reserve player contract	
March 31, 2026	Kira Juodikis	New York Sirens	ZSC Lions Frauen (SWHL A)	Reserve player contract	

=== Contract extensions/terminations ===
Player contract extensions
Date	Player	Team	Term	Ref
June 16, 2025	Kati Tabin	Montreal Victoire	Two years	
June 16, 2025	Natalie Buchbinder	Minnesota Frost	Two years	
June 17, 2025	Susanna Tapani	Boston Fleet	One year	
June 17, 2025	Natalie Spooner	Toronto Sceptres	Two years	
June 17, 2025	Jesse Compher	Toronto Sceptres	Two years	
June 17, 2025	Maddie Rooney	Minnesota Frost	Three years	
June 17, 2025	Jill Saulnier	Boston Fleet	One year	
June 17, 2025	Theresa Schafzahl	Boston Fleet	One year	
June 18, 2025	Taylor Girard	New York Sirens	One year	
June 18, 2025	Maggie Connors	Toronto Sceptres	One year	
June 18, 2025	Rebecca Leslie	Ottawa Charge	Two years	
June 18, 2025	Taylor House	Ottawa Charge	One year	
June 19, 2025	Sandra Abstreiter	Montreal Victoire	One year	
June 19, 2025	Kali Flanagan	Toronto Sceptres	One year	
June 19, 2025	Catherine Dubois	Montreal Victoire	One year	
June 20, 2025	Jessica Kondas	Toronto Sceptres	One year	
June 20, 2025	Lauren Bernard	New York Sirens	One year	
June 20, 2025	Kayla Vespa	New York Sirens	One year	
June 22, 2025	Mae Batherson	Minnesota Frost	Two years	
June 22, 2025	Claire Butorac	Minnesota Frost	One year	
June 27, 2025	Katy Knoll	Minnesota Frost	One year	
June 27, 2025	Hadley Hartmetz	Boston Fleet	One year	
July 8, 2025	Kaitlin Willoughby	Montreal Victoire	One year	
July 9, 2025	Allyson Simpson	New York Sirens	Two years	
July 10, 2025	Anna Meixner	Ottawa Charge	One year	
July 10, 2025	Samantha Isbell	Ottawa Charge	One year	
July 10, 2025	Logan Angers	Ottawa Charge	One year	
July 10, 2025	Jessica Adolfsson	Ottawa Charge	One year	
July 10, 2025	Sarah Fillier	New York Sirens	Two years	
July 11, 2025	Stephanie Markowski	Ottawa Charge	One year	
July 14, 2025	Shay Maloney	Boston Fleet	Two years	
July 17, 2025	Marlène Boissonnault	Minnesota Frost	One year	
July 21, 2025	Alexandra Labelle	Montreal Victoire	One year	
July 23, 2025	Anna Kjellbin	Toronto Sceptres	Two years	
July 24, 2025	Mannon McMahon	Ottawa Charge	One year	
July 24, 2025	Loren Gabel	Boston Fleet	One year	
July 27, 2025	Gwyneth Philips	Ottawa Charge	Two years (Note: Extension will come into effect for the 2026–27 season.)	
August 4, 2025	Aerin Frankel	Boston Fleet	Two years	
August 4, 2025	Megan Keller	Boston Fleet	Two years	
August 4, 2025	Alina Müller	Boston Fleet	Two years	
August 6, 2025	Dominique Petrie	Minnesota Frost	Two years	
August 7, 2025	Emily Clark	Ottawa Charge	Two years	
August 14, 2025	Ashton Bell	Vancouver Goldeneyes	Two years	
September 22, 2025	Maja Nylén Persson	New York Sirens	Three years (Note: This three-year contract represents a one-year extension (through the 2027–28 season) to the original three-year contract she signed after being drafted last year.)	
October 6, 2025	Britta Curl-Salemme	Minnesota Frost	Two years	
October 23, 2025	Marie-Philip Poulin	Montreal Victoire	Two years	
October 23, 2025	Ann-Renée Desbiens	Montreal Victoire	Two years	
October 23, 2025	Laura Stacey	Montreal Victoire	Two years	
November 5, 2025	Micah Zandee-Hart	New York Sirens	One year	
November 18, 2025	Jaime Bourbonnais	New York Sirens	One year	
November 18, 2025	Kayle Osborne	New York Sirens	One year (Note: Extension will come into effect for the 2027–28 season.)	
November 19, 2025	Ella Shelton	Toronto Sceptres	One year	
November 20, 2025	Kelly-Ann Nadeau	Montreal Victoire	Reserve player contract (Note: Was a reserve player for the 2024–25 Montreal Victoire season. Signed a standard player agreement following training camp to fill in for Lina Ljungblom who is on LTIR. Length of contract has not been specified.)	
November 20, 2025	Alexa Vasko	Ottawa Charge	One year	
November 20, 2025	Kaitlyn O'Donohoe	Minnesota Frost	Reserve player contract (Note: Was a reserve player for the 2024–25 Minnesota Frost season.)	
November 20, 2025	Olivia Zafuto	Boston Fleet	Reserve player contract (Note: Was a reserve player for the 2024–25 Boston Fleet season.)	
November 20, 2025	Olivia Knowles	New York Sirens	Reserve player contract (Note: Was a reserve player for the 2024–25 New York Sirens season.)	
November 25, 2025	Gabbie Hughes	Ottawa Charge	One year	
November 25, 2025	Ronja Savolainen	Ottawa Charge	One year	

Player contract terminations
Date	Player	Team	Term remaining	Ref
July 27, 2025	Noora Tulus	New York Sirens	One year	
November 19, 2025	Chloé Aurard	Boston Fleet	One year (Note: Released from preseason/training camp.)	
November 19, 2025	Élizabeth Giguère	Ottawa Charge	One year	
November 19, 2025	Emma Bergesen	Ottawa Charge	One year	
November 19, 2025	Jessica Adolfsson	Ottawa Charge	One year	
November 19, 2025	Logan Angers	Ottawa Charge	One year	
November 19, 2025	Brianna Brooks	Vancouver Goldeneyes	One year	
November 20, 2025	Loren Gabel	Boston Fleet	One year	
January 4, 2026	Claire Vekich	Montreal Victoire	Reserve player contract	
January 9, 2026	Sarah Coe	Ottawa Charge	Reserve player contract	
January 30, 2026	Samantha Isbell	Ottawa Charge	<One year	

=== Trades ===
Date	Details		Ref.
June 24, 2025	To New York Sirens First round pick – 2025 PWHL Draft (#3 – Casey O'Brien); Fourth round pick – 2025 PWHL Draft (#27 – Maddi Wheeler)	To Toronto Sceptres Ella Shelton	
June 24, 2025	To Vancouver Goldeneyes Kristen Campbell; Third round pick – 2025 PWHL Draft (#19 – Nina Jobst-Smith)	To Toronto Sceptres Second round pick – 2025 PWHL Draft (#16 – Kiara Zanon); Third round pick – 2025 PWHL Draft (#23 – Clara Van Wieren)	
June 24, 2025	To New York Sirens Kristin O'Neill; Fourth round pick – 2025 PWHL Draft (#28 – Callie Shanahan)	To Montreal Victoire Abby Roque	
November 19, 2025	To Minnesota Frost Denisa Křížová	To Vancouver Goldeneyes Anna Segedi	
January 18, 2026	To Ottawa Charge Michela Cava; Brooke McQuigge; Emma Greco	To Vancouver Goldeneyes Mannon McMahon; Anna Meixner; Anna Shokhina	
March 16, 2026	To Boston Fleet Jessie Eldridge	To Seattle Torrent Theresa Schafzahl	
March 17, 2026	To New York Sirens Clair DeGeorge	To Toronto Sceptres Future considerations	
March 30, 2026	To New York Sirens Denisa Křížová	To Minnesota Frost Jincy Roese	

=== Retirements ===
Player retirements
Date	Player	Team(s)	Ref
June 1, 2025	Victoria Bach	Toronto Sceptres (2023–24), Ottawa Charge (2024–25)	
August 5, 2025	Jillian Dempsey	Montreal Victoire (2023–24), Boston Fleet (2024–25)	
September 2, 2025	Amanda Pelkey	Boston Fleet (2023–25)	

=== Reserve activations ===
Reserve player activations
Date	Activated player	Team	Absent player	Notes	Ref
November 20, 2025	Kelly-Ann Nadeau	Montreal Victoire	Lina Ljungblom	LTIR	
November 20, 2025	Darcie Lappan	Vancouver Goldeneyes	Nina Jobst-Smith	LTIR	
November 20, 2025	Nicole Vallario	New York Sirens	Dayle Ross	LTIR	
November 22, 2025	Maya Labad	Montreal Victoire	Jade Downie-Landry	LTIR	
November 23, 2025	Olivia Zafuto	Boston Fleet	Zoe Boyd	10 day contract	
November 29, 2025	Lauren Messier	Toronto Sceptres	Daryl Watts	10 day contract	
December 5, 2025	Malia Schneider	Vancouver Goldeneyes	Sarah Nurse	LTIR	
December 15, 2025	Olivia Wallin	Ottawa Charge	Gabbie Hughes	10 day contract	
December 18, 2025	Olivia Knowles (Note: This transaction returns Nicole Vallario to the reserve player roster.)	New York Sirens	Dayle Ross	LTIR	
December 27, 2025	Hanna Baskin	Toronto Sceptres	Allie Munroe	10 day contract	
January 2, 2026	Hanna Baskin	Toronto Sceptres	Allie Munroe	LTIR	
January 3, 2026	Mia Biotti	Boston Fleet	N/A	10 day contract	
January 4, 2026	Tamara Giaquinto	Montreal Victoire	Erin Ambrose	10 day contract	
January 6, 2026	Sarah Coe	Ottawa Charge	Sanni Ahola	LTIR	
January 8, 2026	Kaitlyn O'Donohoe	Minnesota Frost	Dominique Petrie	LTIR	
January 22, 2026	Malia Schneider	Vancouver Goldeneyes	N/A	10 day contract	
January 30, 2026	Olivia Wallin	Ottawa Charge	Samantha Isbell	Contract termination	
February 26, 2026	Tamara Giaquinto	Montreal Victoire	Erin Ambrose	LTIR	
February 26, 2026	Kelly-Ann Nadeau	Montreal Victoire	Marie-Philip Poulin	10 day contract	
February 27, 2026	Olivia Zafuto	Boston Fleet	Olivia Mobley	LTIR	
February 27, 2026	Lauren Messier	Toronto Sceptres	Emma Gentry	10 day contract	
February 27, 2026	Élizabeth Giguère	Minnesota Frost	Kendall Coyne Schofield	LTIR	
February 28, 2026	Sydney Langseth	Seattle Torrent	Hilary Knight	LTIR	
March 1, 2026	Brianna Brooks	Vancouver Goldeneyes	N/A	10 day contract	
March 10, 2026	Jada Habisch	Seattle Torrent	Hannah Bilka	LTIR	
March 13, 2026	Kaitlyn Ross	Ottawa Charge	Sanni Ahola	10 day contract	
March 18, 2026	Kristin Della Rovere	Toronto Sceptres	Clair DeGeorge	Player traded	
March 18, 2026	Nicole Vallario	New York Sirens	Taylor Girard	10 day contract/LTIR	
March 27, 2026	Vita Poniatovskaia	Ottawa Charge	Brooke Hobson	LTIR	
March 31, 2026	Nicole Vallario	New York Sirens	Kristýna Kaltounková	LTIR	
April 3, 2026	Brooke Bryant	Seattle Torrent	N/A	10 day contract	
April 4, 2026	Sam Cogan	Minnesota Frost	N/A	10 day contract	
April 8, 2026	Hanna Baskin	Toronto Sceptres	Allie Munroe	LTIR	
April 15, 2026	Noemi Neubauerová	Boston Fleet	N/A	10 day contract	
April 15, 2026	Sam Cogan	Minnesota Frost	Natalie Buchbinder	LTIR	
April 15, 2026	Kaitlyn O'Donohoe	Minnesota Frost	N/A	10 day contract	

== Broadcast rights ==
=== Canada ===
==== English ====
For the 2025–26 season, games in Canada were broadcast in English across TSN, Sportsnet, Prime Video, and CBC. TSN broadcast 54 regular season games, along with one PWHL Playoff semifinal and all games from the PWHL Finals. Prime Video broadcast 19 games, along with the other PWHL Playoff semifinal. Sportsnet broadcast 30 regular season games, while CBC or CBC Gem broadcast 17 games.

==== French ====
In Canada, all games featuring the Montréal Victoire will also be broadcast in French. These games are split between RDS, Ici Télé and Prime Video. RDS broadcast 17 games, along with one PWHL Playoff semifinal and all games from the PWHL Finals. Prime Video broadcast six games, along with the other PWHL Playoff semifinal. ICI TÉLÉ or ICI TOU.TV broadcast seven games.

=== United States ===
==== Local ====
Locally, Boston Fleet games were broadcast on NESN, with select games simulcast on WSBK-TV. Minnesota Frost games were broadcast on FanDuel Sports Network North, with select games simulcast on KMSP-TV. New York Sirens games were broadcast on MSG Network, with select games simulcast on WWOR-TV. Seattle Torrent games are primarily broadcast on KZJO, with six games airing instead on KONG.

==== National ====
Nationally, all games in the United States were broadcast on YouTube. In addition, some games were shown out-of-market on select FanDuel Sports Network stations, SportsNet Pittsburgh, select Gray Broadcast Sports Networks stations, and select Scripps Sports stations.

In March 2026, the PWHL reached a test agreement with U.S. network Ion Television, which already owned the rights to several leading women's sports properties. This represented the circuit's first true national TV exposure in the country. It entailed the broadcasting of a regular season game and the entire Walter Cup Finals. The league's U.S. national TV debut, a March 28 game between Montreal and New York, drew 133,000 viewers.

=== International ===
In Czechia and Slovakia, games were broadcast on Nova Sport. Outside of Canada, Czechia, and Slovakia, games were broadcast on the PWHL YouTube channel and thepwhl.com.
