= Alyssa Regalado =

- Born: January 3, 2004 (age 22) Mississauga, Ontario
- Height: 5 ft 7 in (170 cm)
- Position: Defense
- Shoots: Left
- PWHL team: Toronto Sceptres
- Playing career: 2026–present

Alyssa Regalado (born January 3, 2004) is a professional ice hockey forward drafted by the Toronto Sceptres of the Professional Women's Hockey League. She played her college ice hockey with Cornell.

== Playing career ==
=== College ===
During the 2024-25 season, Regalado registered 20 points. In the 2025 NCAA Tournament regional playoff versus #6 Minnesota-Duluth, Regalado scored the only goal in a 1-0 win. With the win, Cornell qualified for the Frozen Four.

In her senior season (2025-26), she appeared in 35 games. Having blocked 45 shots, the season saw her record 19 points.

=== Professional ===
On June 17, 2026, Regalado was selected sixty-eighth overall in the 2026 PWHL Draft.

== Awards and honors ==
- ECAC Hockey All-Rookie Team (2022-23)
- First Team All-Ivy (2022-23)
- Second Team All-Ivy (2024-25, 2025-26)
