= Vita Poniatovskaia =

Russian ice hockey player (born 2003)

- Born: January 8, 2003 (age 23) Chelyabinsk, Russia
- Height: 5 ft 8 in (173 cm)
- Position: Defence
- Shoots: Right
- PWHL team: Ottawa Charge

Vita Poniatovskaia (born January 8, 2003) is a professional ice hockey defender for the Ottawa Charge of the Professional Women's Hockey League. She played her college ice hockey with Yale University.

== Career ==
=== Youth ===
Poniatovskaia played at the hockey school of Sergei Makarov from 2009 to 2013. She then played on the Pervomayka Lions boys team until 2015, when she moved to HC Mechel, to play on the boys (2003s) team. In 2018, Poniatovskaia moved to the Barrie, Ontario area and played for the Hockey Training Institute, serving as captain in 2020–2021.

Poniatovskaia played on team Russia at the World Junior Championships from 2018 to 2020, and was the youngest member of the team in 2018. She won bronze in 2020. She also won gold at the Europe U-16 Championship in 2017 and silver in 2018.

=== NCAA ===
Poniatovskaia played four seasons with the Yale Bulldogs. She played 131 games from 2021 to 2025, scoring 62 points (27 goals, 35 assists). In 2021–22, she was named to the All-ECAC Rookie Team, and was second among ECAC blueliners in goals. She was named to the Second Team All-Ivy in 2022–23 and 2023–24.

=== Professional ===
Ponyatovskaia declared for the 2025 PWHL Draft but was not drafted. She later signed as a reserve player with the Ottawa Charge for the 2025–26 PWHL season. She was activated from the reserve list on March 27, 2026, following Brooke Hobson's injury. Ponyatovskaia became the third Russian player to play for a PWHL team, following Anna Shokhina and Fanuza Kadirova, both also initially signed by the Charge. She made her debut on March 31, 2026.

== Statistics ==
			Regular season					Playoffs
Season	Team	League	GP	G	A	Pts	PIM	GP	G	A	Pts	PIM
2021–22	Yale University	ECAC	36	9	11	20	8	—	—	—	—	—
2022–23	Yale University	ECAC	33	9	12	21	12	—	—	—	—	—
2023–24	Yale University	ECAC	32	3	7	10	12	—	—	—	—	—
2024–25	Yale University	ECAC	30	6	5	11	12	—	—	—	—	—
2025–26	Ottawa Charge	PWHL	7	0	0	0	2	—	—	—	—	—
NCAA totals			131	27	35	62	44	—	—	—	—	—
