= Mia Biotti =

American ice hockey player (born 2002)

- Born: July 24, 2002 (age 24) Cambridge, Massachusetts, U.S.
- Height: 5 ft 11 in (180 cm)
- Position: Defense
- Shoots: Left
- PWHL team Former teams: Detroit Clutch; Boston Fleet
- Playing career: 2025–present

Mia Biotti (born July 24, 2002) is a professional ice hockey player who is a defender for the Detroit Clutch of the Professional Women's Hockey League (PWHL). She previously played for the Boston Fleet of the PWHL. She played college ice hockey at Harvard University.

== Early life ==
Biotti played for the East Coast Wizards from 2009 to 2021. She served as team captain during her senior season at her high school, Buckingham, Browne, and Nichols.

== Playing career ==
=== College ===
Biotti played four seasons at Harvard, where she scored six goals and 32 assists in 122 games. She was named ECAC Hockey Rookie of the Week for February 14, 2022. She earned Second-Team All-Ivy honors and served as captain her senior year.

=== Professional ===
After going undrafted, Biotti attended the Boston Fleet's training camp. She signed as a reserve player with the team for the 2025–26 season. She was signed to a 10-day Standard Player Agreement on January 3, 2026 after Daniela Pejšová was injured and made her debut against the Vancouver Goldeneyes that day. She signed a standard contract on January 26, 2026 after Riley Brengman was placed on LTIR.

On June 21, 2026, she signed a one-year contract with the Detroit Clutch.

== Personal life ==
Biotti's father Jon Biotti played hockey and baseball at Harvard. Her uncle, Chris Biotti, played hockey for Harvard and the Calgary Flames. She also played field hockey and softball in high school. According to her USA Hockey profile, Biotti wants to be a businesswoman after ice hockey, and her favorite postgame meal is pasta and chicken.

== International play ==
In 2020, Biotti won a gold medal with the United States at the 2020 IIHF U18 Women's World Championship.

== Career statistics ==
			Regular season					Playoffs
Season	Team	League	GP	G	A	Pts	PIM	GP	G	A	Pts	PIM
2021–22	Harvard University	ECAC	32	2	13	15	2	—	—	—	—	—
2022–23	Harvard University	ECAC	31	2	7	9	6	—	—	—	—	—
2023–24	Harvard University	ECAC	30	1	7	8	8	—	—	—	—	—
2024–25	Harvard University	ECAC	29	1	5	6	2	—	—	—	—	—
2025–26	Boston Fleet	PWHL	13	0	2	2	0	2	0	0	0	2
PWHL totals			13	0	2	2	0	2	0	0	0	0
