= Rylind MacKinnon =

Canadian ice hockey player (born 2000)

- Born: March 5, 2000 (age 26) Cranbrook, British Columbia, Canada
- Height: 5 ft 10 in (178 cm)
- Position: Defence
- Shoots: Left
- PWHL team Former teams: Boston Fleet; Toronto Sceptres
- Playing career: 2018–present

Rylind MacKinnon (born March 5, 2000) is a Canadian professional ice hockey player who is a defender for the Boston Fleet of the Professional Women's Hockey League (PWHL). She previously played for the Toronto Sceptres of the PWHL.

== Playing career ==
=== College ===
MacKinnon attended the University of British Columbia where she played ice hockey for the UBC Thunderbirds. During the 2021–22 season, as a junior, she tied for the league lead in goals with 10 and finished second in total points with 21. Following the season she was named the Canada West Defencemen of the Year. During the 2023–24, in her final season, she served as team captain and recorded ten goals and 12 assists in 26 games. She led all defensemen in scoring with 22 points. Following the season she was named to the U-Sports First Team All-Star team. She helped lead the Thunderbirds to three consecutive Canada West Championships and a bronze medal at the 2023 U Sports Women's Ice Hockey Championship. She finished her career as the team's all-time leader in points by a defenceman with 34 goals and 47 assists in 126 games.

=== Professional ===
After going undrafted in the PWHL Draft, MacKinnon was invited to the Toronto Sceptres' training camp. In Toronto's final pre-season game against the New York Sirens, she had a team-high 23:04 of ice time and recorded an assist. On November 29, 2024, she signed a one-year contract with Toronto. During the 2024–25 season, she recorded two assists in 22 games. On June 20, 2025, she signed a one-year contract with the Boston Fleet. During the 2025–26 season, she recorded one assist in 28 regular season games. On June 20, 2026, she signed a one-year contract extension with the Fleet.

== Career statistics ==
			Regular season					Playoffs
Season	Team	League	GP	G	A	Pts	PIM	GP	G	A	Pts	PIM
2018–19	University of British Columbia	CWUAA	28	5	10	15	30	3	0	0	0	0
2019–20	University of British Columbia	CWUAA	27	2	7	9	44	4	0	1	1	4
2021–22	University of British Columbia	CWUAA	20	10	11	21	24	4	0	0	0	8
2022–23	University of British Columbia	CWUAA	25	7	7	14	34	6	0	1	1	4
2023–24	University of British Columbia	CWUAA	26	10	12	22	20	6	0	3	3	2
2024–25	Toronto Sceptres	PWHL	22	0	2	2	27	—	—	—	—	—
2025–26	Boston Fleet	PWHL	28	0	1	1	14	3	0	0	0	15
PWHL totals			50	0	3	3	41	3	0	0	0	15
