= Maggie Connors =

Canadian ice hockey player (born 2000)

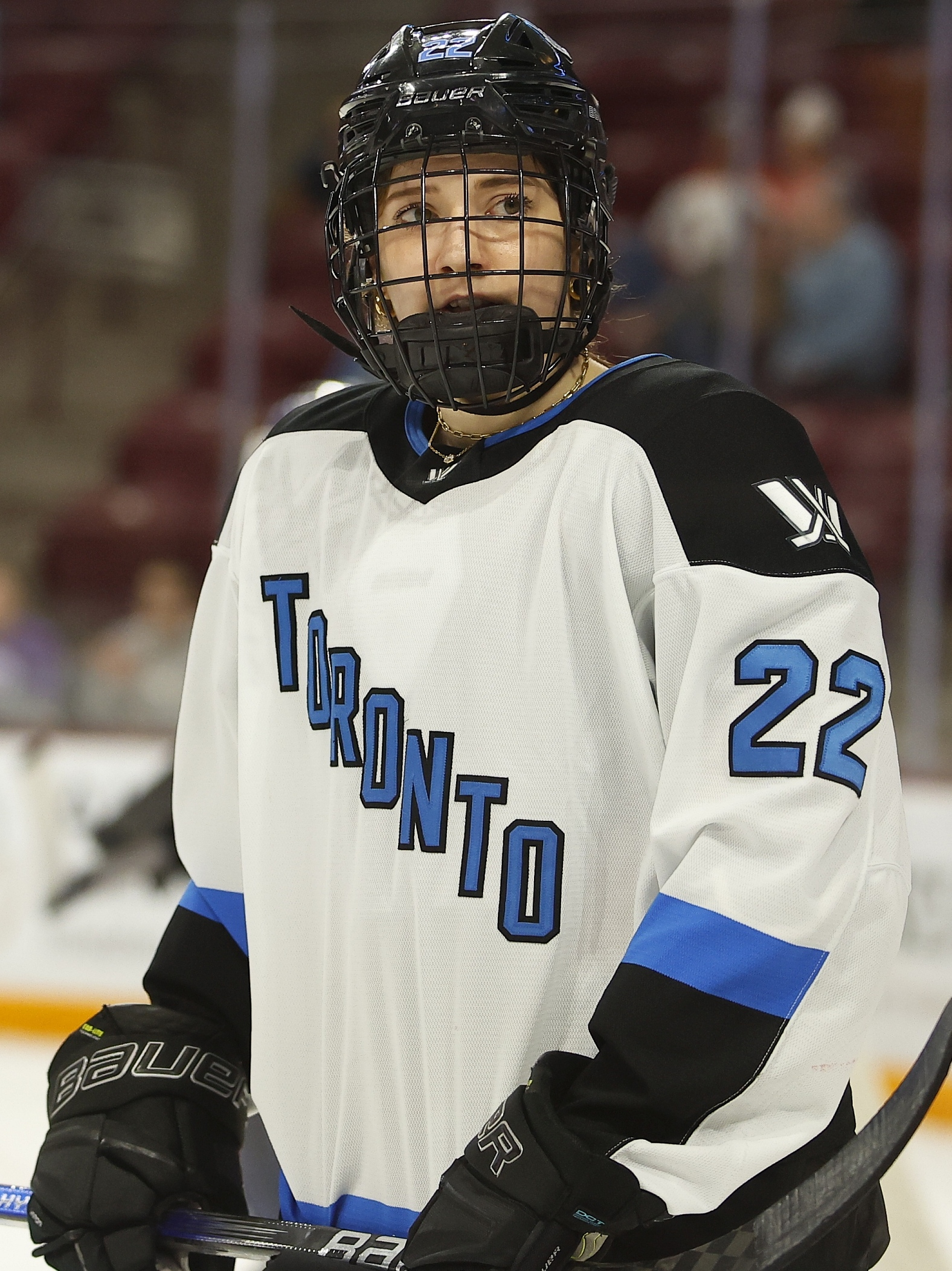
- Connors with the Toronto Sceptres in 2024
- Born: October 22, 2000 (age 26) St. John's, Newfoundland and Labrador, Canada
- Height: 5 ft 6 in (168 cm)
- Weight: 132 lb (60 kg; 9 st 6 lb)
- Position: Forward
- Shoots: Left
- PWHL team Former teams: San Jose Sea Lions; Toronto Sceptres
- Playing career: 2024–present

Margaret Joan Connors (born October 22, 2000) is a Canadian professional ice hockey forward for the San Jose Sea Lions of the Professional Women's Hockey League (PWHL). She previously played for the Toronto Sceptres of the PWHL.

== Early life ==
Margaret Joan Connors was born October 22, 2000, in St. John's, Newfoundland and Labrador, to cardiologists Sean Connors and Susan Fagan. She began playing ice hockey at the age of four, first participating in local boys' hockey leagues. When she was ten years old, Connors won a contest to spend a day with members of the Canada women's national ice hockey team, including her childhood idol Natalie Spooner. In 2013, Connors enrolled at Shattuck-Saint Mary's in Faribault, Minnesota, with whom she would win four national ice hockey championships in five seasons. During her final season with Shattuck, Connors recorded 75 points in 50 games.

== Playing career ==
=== College ===
After leaving Shattuck, Connors joined the Princeton Tigers for the 2018–19 season. Between 2018 and 2023, Connors scored 78 goals with Princeton and recorded 67 assists for 145 points, the 12th-most in program history. In 2020, she was part of the team to win Princeton's first ECAC Hockey tournament title.

=== Professional ===
The Toronto Sceptres of the Professional Women's Hockey League (PWHL) selected Connors in the 11th round, 62nd overall, of the 2023 PWHL draft. On October 31, 2023, she signed a two-year contract with Toronto. The only player from Newfoundland and Labrador during the PWHL's inaugural 2023–24 season, Connors recorded six points in 24 regular season games. She also appeared in five playoff games as the Sceptres lost to the Minnesota Frost in the semifinals.

On June 18, 2025, Connors signed a one-year contract extension with the Toronto Sceptres.

After three seasons in Toronto, Connors signed a two-year contract with the San Jose Sea Lions on June 11, 2026.

== International play ==
Medal record

Representing Canada

Ice hockey

World U18 Championships
Bronze medal – third place	2018 Russia	

Connors won a bronze medal with the Canada women's national under-18 ice hockey team at the 2018 IIHF World Women's U18 Championship in Russia. She recorded one goal and three points in six tournament games.

== Career statistics ==
=== Regular season and playoffs ===
			Regular season					Playoffs
Season	Team	League	GP	G	A	Pts	PIM	GP	G	A	Pts	PIM
2018–19	Princeton Tigers	ECAC	32	26	17	43	12	—	—	—	—	—
2019–20	Princeton Tigers	ECAC	33	22	25	47	14	—	—	—	—	—
2021–22	Princeton Tigers	ECAC	31	13	9	22	10	—	—	—	—	—
2022–23	Princeton Tigers	ECAC	31	17	16	33	16	—	—	—	—	—
2023–24	PWHL Toronto	PWHL	24	3	3	6	6	5	0	0	0	0
2024–25	Toronto Sceptres	PWHL	30	2	0	2	6	4	1	1	2	0
2025–26	Toronto Sceptres	PWHL	30	3	2	5	6	—	—	—	—	—
PWHL totals			84	8	5	13	18	9	1	1	2	0

=== International ===
Year	Team	Event	Result	GP	G	A	Pts	PIM
2018	Canada	WU18	3rd place, bronze medalist(s)	6	1	2	3	6
Junior totals				6	1	2	3	6
