= Lauren Messier =

Canadian ice hockey player (born 2003)

- Born: July 3, 2003 (age 23) Burlington, Ontario, Canada
- Height: 5 ft 5 in (165 cm)
- Position: Forward
- Shoots: Left
- PWHL team: Toronto Sceptres
- Playing career: 2021–present

Lauren Messier (born July 3, 2003) is a Canadian professional ice hockey player for the Toronto Sceptres of the Professional Women's Hockey League (PWHL). She played college ice hockey at Dartmouth College.

== Early life ==
Messier was born to Marc Messier and Lisa Kangas, and has an older sister, Paige. Her father played college baseball at Central Michigan and is the athletic director for Nelson High School. She attended Nelson High School and was a member of the field hockey, ice hockey, flag football, and track & field teams.

She played junior ice hockey for the Stoney Creek Sabres and helped lead them to a bronze medal at the 2019 Esso Cup, defeating the Saskatoon Stars 3–2 in a shootout.

== Playing career ==
=== College ===
Messier began her collegiate career at Dartmouth College during the 2021–22 season. During her freshman year she appeared in all 29 games and recorded seven goals and four assists. During the 2022–23 season, in her sophomore year, she appeared in all 29 games and recorded three goals and five assists. During the 2023–24 season, in her junior year, she appeared in all 30 games and recorded five goals and seven assists.

During the 2024–25 season, in her senior year, she appeared in all 29 games and led her team in scoring with a career-high eight goals and nine assists. Following the season she was named to the All-Ivy Second Team and the Agnes B. Kurtz Award winner. She finished her collegiate career with 23 goals and 25 assists in 117 games.

=== Professional ===
After going undrafted in the 2025 PWHL Draft, Messier was invited to the Toronto Sceptres' pre-season training camp. On November 20, 2025, she signed a reserve player contract with the Sceptres. On November 29, 2025, she signed a ten-day contract with the Sceptres, after Daryl Watts was sidelined day-to-day with an upper-body injury. On February 27, 2026, she signed another ten-day contract with the team, after Emma Gentry was sidelined with a lower-body injury. She scored her first career goal on March 1, 2026, in a game against the Vancouver Goldeneyes.

== Career statistics ==
			Regular season					Playoffs
Season	Team	League	GP	G	A	Pts	PIM	GP	G	A	Pts	PIM
2021–22	Dartmouth College	ECAC	29	7	4	11	14	—	—	—	—	—
2022–23	Dartmouth College	ECAC	29	3	5	8	8	—	—	—	—	—
2023–24	Dartmouth College	ECAC	30	5	7	12	12	—	—	—	—	—
2024–25	Dartmouth College	ECAC	29	8	9	17	12	—	—	—	—	—
2025–26	Toronto Sceptres	PWHL	5	1	0	1	0	—	—	—	—	—
PWHL totals			5	1	0	1	0	—	—	—	—	—
