= Jessica Kondas =

Canadian ice hockey player (born 2000)

- Born: January 3, 2000 (age 26) Calgary, Alberta, Canada
- Height: 5 ft 9 in (175 cm)
- Weight: 152 lb (69 kg; 10 st 12 lb)
- Position: Defence
- Shoots: Right
- PWHL team Former teams: Toronto Sceptres; SDE Hockey
- Playing career: 2017–present

Jessica Kondas (born January 3, 2000) is a Canadian professional ice hockey defenceman for the Toronto Sceptres of the Professional Women's Hockey League (PWHL). She previously played for SDE Hockey of the Swedish Women's Hockey League (SDHL). She played college ice hockey at Minnesota State.

== Playing career ==
=== College ===
Kondas began her collegiate career for Minnesota State during the 2017–18 season. During her freshman year, she recorded one goal and two assists in 33 games. During the 2018–19 season in her sophomore year, she recorded two assists in 33 games. During the 2019–20 season in her junior year, she recorded four goals and one assist in 35 games. During the 2020–21 season in her senior year, she recorded three goals and two assists in 30 games. On December 6, 2021, she was named WCHA Defensive Player of the Week for the first time in her career after tying for the team lead in scoring with three assists in a weekend series against St. Thomas.

On August 31, 2021, Kondas was named an alternate captain for the 2021–22 season. During her graduate student year, she recorded a career-high four goals and 15 assists in 33 games. She finished her career with 248 blocked shots, which ranks third all-time at Minnesota State.

=== Professional ===
Following her collegiate career, Konndas joined SDE Hockey of the SDHL. During the 2022–23 season, she recorded one goal and three assists in 32 games. In October 2023, she was invited to PWHL Toronto's training camp. She later signed with Toronto as a reserve player during the 2023–24 season. In November 2024, she signed a reserve contract with the Toronto Sceptres. On December 27, 2024, she signed a ten-day standard player agreement with the Sceptres and was later recalled by the team, following a one-game suspension to Rylind MacKinnon. She made her PWHL debut later that day and scored her first professional goal against the Boston Fleet.

== Career statistics ==
			Regular season					Playoffs
Season	Team	League	GP	G	A	Pts	PIM	GP	G	A	Pts	PIM
2017–18	Minnesota State University	WCHA	33	1	2	3	6	—	—	—	—	—
2018–19	Minnesota State University	WCHA	33	0	2	2	6	—	—	—	—	—
2019–20	Minnesota State University	WCHA	35	4	1	5	14	—	—	—	—	—
2020–21	Minnesota State University	WCHA	20	3	2	5	10	—	—	—	—	—
2021–22	Minnesota State University	WCHA	33	4	15	19	14	—	—	—	—	—
2022–23	SDE Hockey	SDHL	32	1	3	4	51	2	0	0	0	0
2024–25	Toronto Sceptres	PWHL	1	1	0	1	0	—	—	—	—	—
2025–26	Toronto Sceptres	PWHL	14	0	0	0	2	—	—	—	—	—
PWHL totals			15	1	0	1	2	—	—	—	—	—
SDHL totals			32	1	3	4	51	2	0	0	0	0
