= Bishop Kearney High School =

There are two Catholic secondary schools named Bishop Kearney High School in the U.S. state of New York:

- Bishop Kearney High School (Irondequoit, New York), near Rochester
- Bishop Kearney High School (New York City), in Brooklyn
