= Kiara Zanon =

American ice hockey player (born 2002)

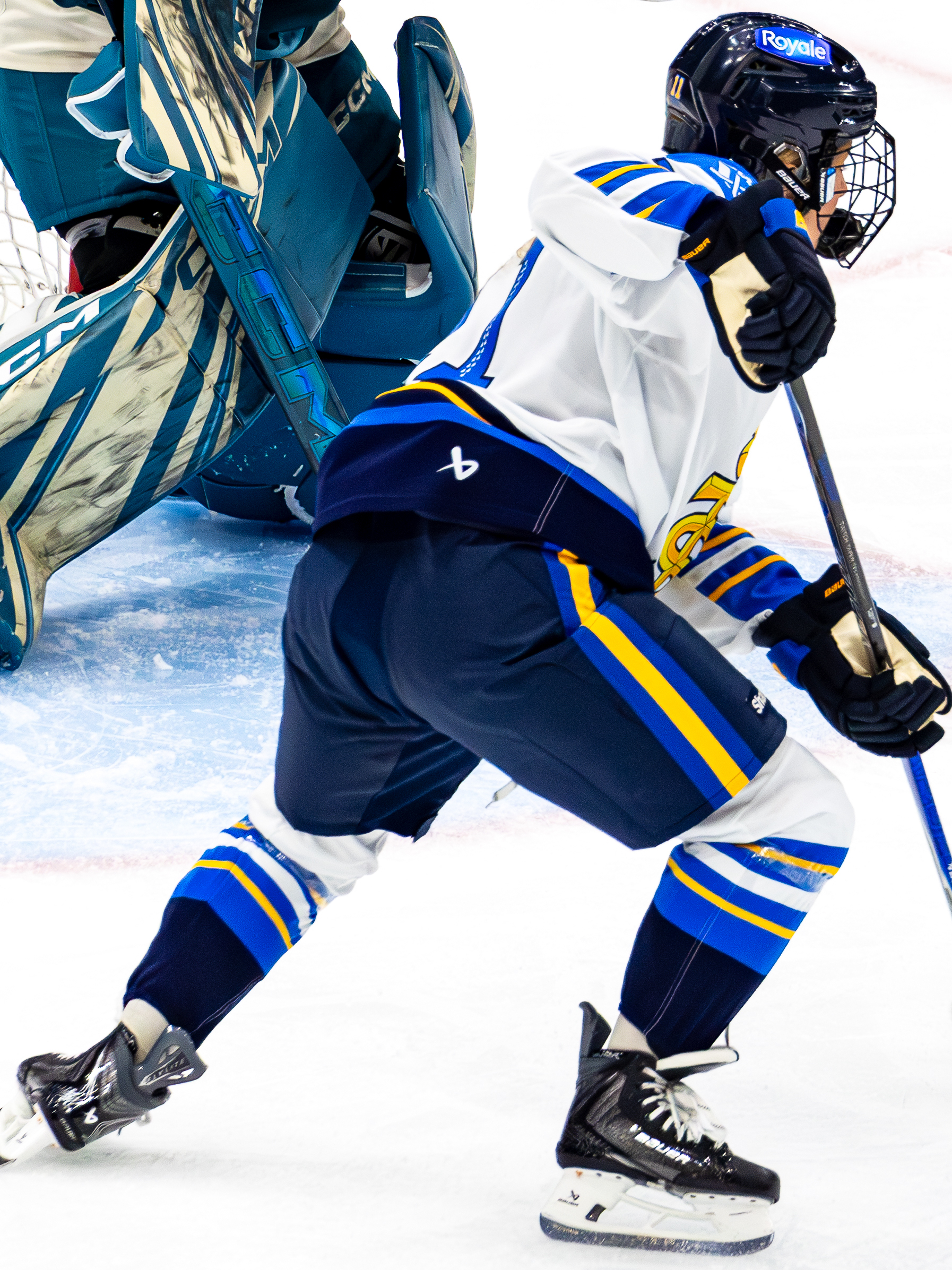
- Zanon with the Toronto Sceptres in 2026
- Born: August 22, 2002 (age 24) Fairport, New York, US
- Height: 5 ft 5 in (165 cm)
- Weight: 145 lb (66 kg; 10 st 5 lb)
- Position: Forward
- Shoots: Left
- PWHL team: Toronto Sceptres
- National team: United States
- Playing career: 2020–present
Medal record
Women's ice hockey
Representing United States
World U18 Championships
Silver medal – second place	2019 Japan
Gold medal – first place	2020 Slovakia

Kiara Zanon (born August 22, 2002) is an American professional ice hockey player for the Toronto Sceptres of the Professional Women's Hockey League (PWHL) and was a member of the United States women's U18 national ice hockey team. She played college ice hockey at Penn State and Ohio State.

== Early life ==
Kiara Zanon was born on August, 22, 2002 in Fairport, NY, to Trish and Steve Zanon. Her father, Steve, played collegiate hockey for Geneseo. Zanon attended three years of prep school while playing for Bishop Kearney, a Selects Academy in Rochester, New York.

== Playing career ==
=== College ===
Zanon began her collegiate career for Penn State during the 2020–21 season. During her freshman year, she recorded 10 goals and 20 assists in 21 games. She led the team in points with 30, and led all rookies in the country in points, points per game, assists, and assists per game. She set a program single-season record with a +23 plus–minus rating and a program best nine multi-point games. She was named College Hockey America (CHA) Rookie of the Month three consecutive months in December 2020, January 2021 and February 2021. She was also named the Hockey Commissioners Association Women's National Rookie of the Month in December 2020. Following an outstanding season, she was named to the CHA All-First Team, and All-Rookie Team. She was also awarded the CHA Player of the Year, CHA Rookie of the Year, and the Women's Hockey Commissioners Association National Rookie of the Year. She was also named a Second Team CCM/AHCA All-American and a top-ten finalist for the Patty Kazmaier Award, becoming the first Nittany Lion player to achieve this honor in program history.

During the 2021–22 season in her sophomore year, she recorded thirteen goals and 26 assists in 33 games. She ranked second in the CHA in points with 39, and led the CHA in assists with 26. Following the season was named to the CHA All-First Team.

On June 1, 2022, Zanon was named a co-captain of the Nittany Lions for the 2022–23 season. On December 4, 2022, Zanon recorded her first career hat-trick in a game against Syracuse, as Penn State set a program record for the most goals scored in a single game. On January 13, 2023, Zanon recorded her 100th career point, becoming the fourth Nittany Lion in program history to reach the milestone. She also became the fastest player in program history to reach the milestone.

On May 1, 2023, Zanon announced she would transfer to Ohio State for the 2023–24 season. During her senior year, she recorded 14 goals and 27 assists in 39 games, and helped lead the Buckeyes to their second national championship in program history. During the 2024–25 she recorded 12 goals and 20 assists in 40 games. She finished her collegiate career with 75 goals and 116 assists in 171 games, averaging over a point per game in five NCAA seasons.

=== Professional ===
On June 24, 2025, Zanon was drafted in the second round, 16th overall, by the Toronto Sceptres in the 2025 PWHL Draft. On November 20, 2025, she signed a one-year contract with the Sceptres.. She made her PWHL debut on November 21, 2025, where she scored the game-winning goal in the third-period; her first in the PWHL.

== International play ==
Zanon represented the United States at the 2019 IIHF World Women's U18 Championship where she recorded one assist in five games and won a silver medal. She again represented the United States at the 2020 IIHF World Women's U18 Championship, where she recorded one goal and two assists in five games and won a gold medal. She scored the game-winning goal in overtime against Canada in the gold medal game.

== Career statistics ==
=== Regular season and playoffs ===
			Regular season					Playoffs
Season	Team	League	GP	G	A	Pts	PIM	GP	G	A	Pts	PIM
2020–21	Penn State University	CHA	21	10	20	30	8	—	—	—	—	—
2021–22	Penn State University	CHA	33	13	26	39	6	—	—	—	—	—
2022–23	Penn State University	CHA	38	26	23	49	6	—	—	—	—	—
2023–24	Ohio State University	WCHA	39	14	27	41	10	—	—	—	—	—
2024–25	Ohio State University	WCHA	40	12	20	32	12	—	—	—	—	—
2025–26	Toronto Sceptres	PWHL	30	1	2	3	6	—	—	—	—	—
PWHL totals			30	1	2	3	6	—	—	—	—	—

=== International ===
Year	Team	Event	Result	GP	G	A	Pts	PIM
2019	United States	U18	2nd place, silver medalist(s)	5	0	1	1	0
2020	United States	U18	1st place, gold medalist(s)	5	1	2	3	0
Junior totals				10	1	3	4	0
