= Anneke Rankila =

American ice hockey player (born 1999)

- Born: November 10, 1999 (age 26) Lino Lakes, Minnesota
- Height: 5 ft 10 in (178 cm)
- Position: Forward
- Shoots: Right
- PWHL team Former teams: Toronto Sceptres; Djurgårdens IF

Anneke Rankila (née Linser, born November 10, 1999) is an American ice hockey forward for the Toronto Sceptres of the Professional Women's Hockey League (PWHL). Under her birth name, Anneke Linser, she played college ice hockey for five seasons at the University of Minnesota Duluth (UMD), and participated in U18 international play for USA Hockey's national women's team. After her graduation from UMD, she played for Djurgårdens IF in the Swedish Women's Hockey League (SDHL) in the 2023–2024 season, prior to being drafted by Toronto in the sixth round of the 2024 PWHL Draft.

== Playing career ==
=== High school ===
Rankila was born Anneke Linser on November 10, 1999 in Appleton, Wisconsin By the time she reached high school, her family resided in Lino Lakes, and she played high school hockey for four seasons at Centennial High School graduating after the 2017–2018 season. She was an assistant captain for the Centennial Cougars in her junior year, and captained the team in her senior year. In her final season, she was one of five finalists for the Minnesota Girls Hockey Coaches Association's Ms. Hockey Award, which recognizes "the top senior girls' high school hockey player in the state, based on the following criteria: academics, community/extra-curricular activities, citizenship, coachability and, of course, on-ice performance."

=== College ===
Rankila enrolled at the University of Minnesota Duluth (UMD) prior to the 2018–2019 collegiate season: she played five seasons for the Bulldogs, earning honors as a Western Collegiate Hockey Association (WCHA) Scholar Athlete and as a member of the WCHA All-Academic Team in each of her final four seasons. At the time of her graduation, she had the third most games played for the women's ice hockey team in the university's history, having played on UMD teams that made three straight NCAA tournaments, two of which made it to the NCAA Women's Frozen Four. She was named one of the National Strength and Conditioning Association's All-American Strength and Conditioning Athletes of the Year following the 2022–2023 season.

=== Professional ===
Following graduation from UMD, Rankila initially signed with the Metropolitan Riveters of the Premier Hockey Federation (PHF), but after the PHF was dissolved in the summer of 2023 as part of the creation of the PWHL, she chose to sign with Djurgårdens IF and play the 2023–2024 season in the Swedish Women's Hockey League (SDHL). She found early success offensively in the SDHL, and her achievements by the end of the season included scoring 31 points in 36 games, with a plus/minus rating of +29, a track record that had many PWHL draft watchers anticipating that she would be selected in that league's second annual draft in the summer of 2024.

After those predictions came true and she was taken as the 36th pick of the 2024 draft by the team then known as PWHL Toronto, both she and her team changed names later that year: PWHL Toronto became the Toronto Sceptres in the league's announcement of official nicknames for all six original teams, and Anneke Linser took the name Anneke Rankila after her wedding in August. Although Rankila did not make the Sceptres' opening night lineup to begin the 2024–2025 season, she was successful in securing one of the final places on the team's roster, and made her PWHL debut on December 1, 2024, in a game against the Montreal Victoire.

== International play ==
While in high school, she played for USA Hockey's Women's U18 Select Team in the 2016 series against Canada's U18 Select Team; the following year, she was a member of the United States women's national under-18 ice hockey team that won the gold medal at the 2017 IIHF U18 Women's World Championship.
