= Hanna Baskin =

American ice hockey player (born 2003)

- Born: July 10, 2003 (age 23) Excelsior, Minnesota, U.S.
- Height: 5 ft 9 in (175 cm)
- Position: Defense
- Shoots: Left
- PWHL team: Toronto Sceptres

Hanna Baskin (born July 10, 2003) is an American professional ice hockey defenseman for the Toronto Sceptres of the Professional Women's Hockey League (PWHL). She played college ice hockey for the Minnesota Duluth Bulldogs, serving as an alternate captain in 2024–25.

== Early life ==
Baskin is from Excelsior, Minnesota, and played high school hockey for Minnetonka High School.

== Playing career ==
=== College ===
Baskin skated for Minnesota Duluth from 2021 to 2025, appearing in 142 regular-season games and totaling 55 points (7 goals, 48 assists). She was named an alternate captain for 2024–25 and set career bests with 21 assists and 22 points that season.

During 2023–24 she recorded 5 goals and 13 assists (18 points) in 37 games and earned WCHA Defender of the Week honors for a five-point weekend against Bemidji State in January 2024.

In May 2024, Baskin was named an alternate captain of the team for the 2024-2025 season.

Academically, Baskin earned multiple honors including WCHA Scholar-Athlete, WCHA All-Academic Team, AHCA All-American Scholar, and 2024–25 CSC Academic All-District recognition.

=== Professional ===
On June 24, 2025, the Toronto Sceptres selected Baskin in the sixth round, 43rd overall, of the 2025 PWHL Draft. Following training camp, she signed a reserve player contract with the Sceptres prior to the 2025–26 season. On December 27, 2025, Baskin was signed to a 10-day contract as Renata Fast and Allie Munroe were dealing with day-to-day lower body injuries. On January 20, 2026, Baskin was shifted back to the team's reserve list as Allie Munroe was activated from long-term injured reserve. During that time, Baskin skated in six games, but did not put a goal contribution. On April 8, 2026, Baskin was signed to a Professional Women's Hockey League Standard Player Agreement with Toronto Sceptres. She was activated from the team's Reserve Player list for the third time.

== Career statistics ==
			Regular season					Playoffs
Season	Team	League	GP	G	A	Pts	PIM	GP	G	A	Pts	PIM
2021–22	University of Minnesota Duluth	WCHA	28	0	3	3	4	—	—	—	—	—
2022–23	University of Minnesota Duluth	WCHA	39	1	11	12	2	—	—	—	—	—
2023–24	University of Minnesota Duluth	WCHA	37	5	13	18	6	—	—	—	—	—
2024–25	University of Minnesota Duluth	WCHA	38	1	21	22	11	—	—	—	—	—
2025–26	Toronto Sceptres	PWHL	11	0	0	0	2	—	—	—	—	—
PWHL totals			11	0	0	0	2	—	—	—	—	—

== Awards and honors ==
Honor	Year	Ref
College
WCHA Scholar-Athlete	2023, 2024, 2025	
WCHA All-Academic Team	2023, 2024, 2025	
AHCA/Krampade All-American Scholar	2022, 2025	
CSC Academic All-District	2025	
