= Clara Van Wieren =

American ice hockey player (born 2002)

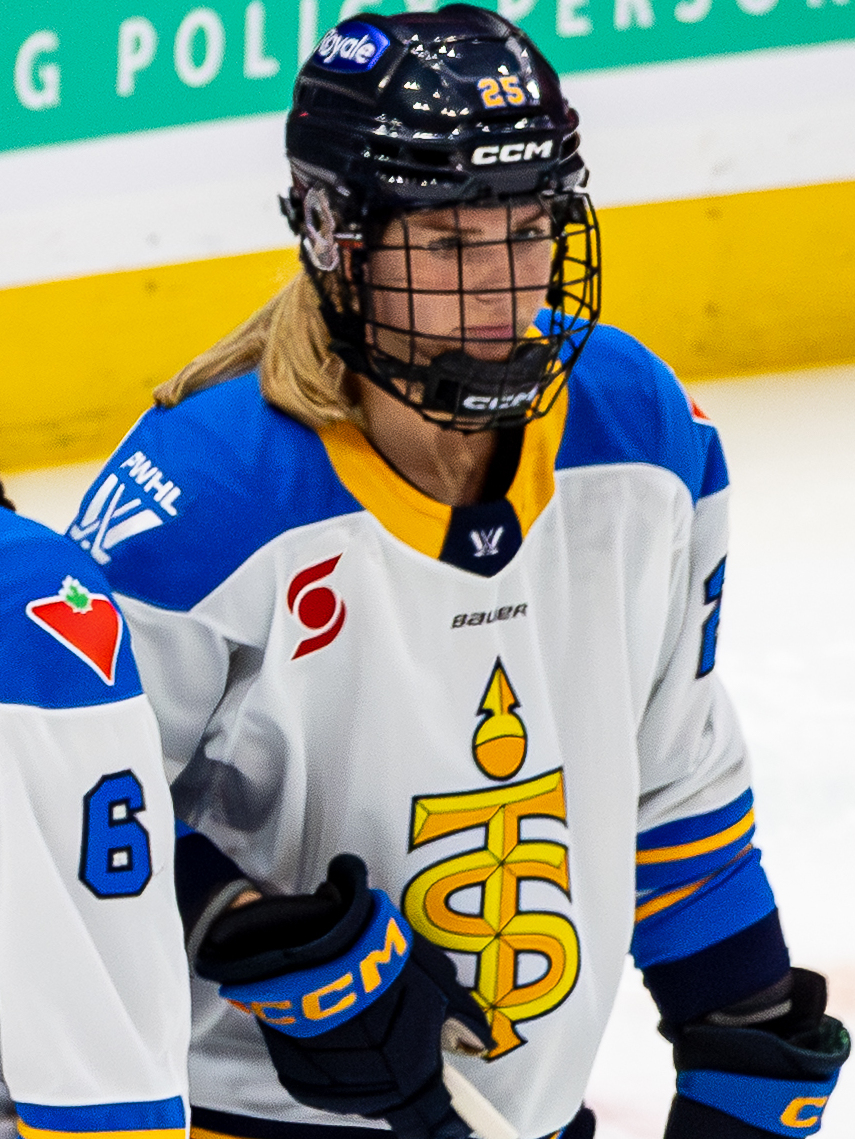
- Van Wieren with the Toronto Sceptres in 2026
- Born: January 25, 2002 (age 24) Cooperstown, New York, U.S.
- Height: 5 ft 10 in (178 cm)
- Weight: 165 lb (75 kg; 11 st 11 lb)
- Position: Forward
- Shoots: Left
- PWHL team: Toronto Sceptres
- National team: United States

Clara Linn Van Wieren (born January 25, 2002) is an American ice hockey forward for the Toronto Sceptres of the Professional Women's Hockey League (PWHL). She played college ice hockey for the Minnesota Duluth Bulldogs.

== Early life ==
Van Wieren was born in Cooperstown, New York, and grew up in Okemos, Michigan. She attended Shattuck-Saint Mary's and previously skated in the Honeybaked program. At the youth international level she represented the United States with the U18 team in 2019 and 2020.

== Playing career ==
=== College ===
Van Wieren joined Minnesota Duluth in 2020–21 and recorded 11 points in 17 games, earning WCHA Rookie of the Month honors in December 2020.

As a sophomore in 2021–22 she posted 28 points in 40 games. She followed with 22 points in 39 games as a junior in 2022–23. In 2023–24 she served as an alternate captain, scored 24 points in 39 games, and was named WCHA Outstanding Student-Athlete of the Year.

In 2024–25, as team captain, she set career highs with 40 points (17 goals, 23 assists) in 39 games and was recognized as a CSC First-Team Academic All-American and an All-WCHA Third Team selection. She graduated as UMD’s all-time leader in games played (174) and reached the 100-point milestone.

=== Professional ===
On June 24, 2025, Van Wieren was drafted in the third round, 23rd overall, by the Toronto Sceptres. On November 20, 2025, she signed a one-year contract with the Sceptres.

== International play ==
Medal record

Representing United States

Ice hockey

World U18 Championship
Gold medal – first place	2020 Slovakia	
Silver medal – second place	2019 Japan	

Van Wieren skated for the United States at the 2019 and 2020 IIHF U18 Women’s World Championships, winning silver in 2019 and gold in 2020.

== Personal life ==
Van Wieren is the daughter of Jeff Ericksen and Gretel Van Wieren and has two siblings. Her older sister, Inga, played college hockey at Middlebury College. She completed an undergraduate double major in political science and philosophy and later pursued a master's degree at Minnesota Duluth.

== Career statistics ==
=== Regular season and playoffs ===
			Regular season					Playoffs
Season	Team	League	GP	G	A	Pts	PIM	GP	G	A	Pts	PIM
2020–21	University of Minnesota Duluth	WCHA	17	7	4	11	6	—	—	—	—	—
2021–22	University of Minnesota Duluth	WCHA	40	9	19	28	14	—	—	—	—	—
2022–23	University of Minnesota Duluth	WCHA	39	9	13	22	31	—	—	—	—	—
2023–24	University of Minnesota Duluth	WCHA	39	13	11	24	30	—	—	—	—	—
2024–25	University of Minnesota Duluth	WCHA	39	17	23	40	20	—	—	—	—	—
2025–26	Toronto Sceptres	PWHL	29	0	2	2	23	—	—	—	—	—
PWHL totals			29	0	2	2	23	—	—	—	—	—

== Awards and honours ==
Honour	Year
College
WCHA Outstanding Student-Athlete of the Year	2024
CSC First-Team Academic All-American	2024, 2025
All-WCHA Third Team	2025
