= Claire Dalton =

Canadian ice hockey player (born 2000)

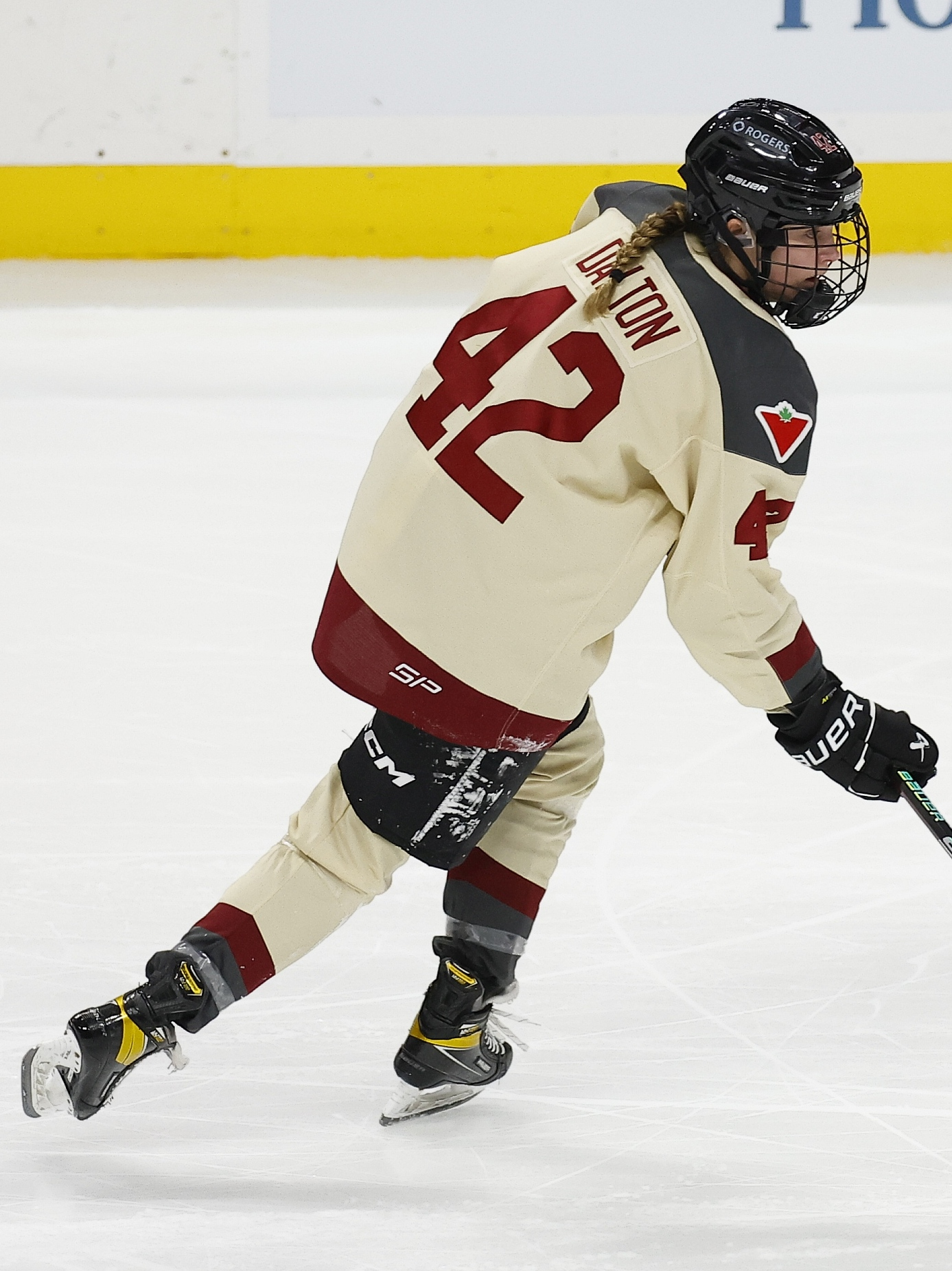
- Dalton with PWHL Montreal in 2024
- Born: March 20, 2000 (age 26) Etobicoke, Ontario, Canada
- Height: 5 ft 9 in (175 cm)
- Position: Forward
- Shoots: Right
- PWHL team Former teams: Toronto Sceptres; Montreal Victoire
- Playing career: 2023–present

Claire Dalton (born March 20, 2000) is a Canadian professional ice hockey player who is a forward for the Toronto Sceptres of the Professional Women's Hockey League (PWHL). She previously played for the Montreal Victoire of the PWHL. She played college ice hockey at Yale.

== Playing career ==
=== College ===
Dalton played her college hockey at Yale. As a freshman and a sophomore, she was chosen as the team's most valuable player. She served as Yale's team captain during her senior season (2022–23), leading the team to their first Ivy League title. She graduated as Yale's all-time leader in assists with 89. She averaged over a point-per-game through her Yale career, scoring 133 points in 130 games.

=== Professional ===
Dalton originally signed a one-year contract with the Toronto Six in the Premier Hockey Federation (PHF). Following the dissolution of the PHF and the creation of the PWHL, Dalton was drafted in the twelfth round, sixty-seventh overall, by PWHL Montreal in the inaugural PWHL draft.

Dalton scored PWHL Montreal's first-ever goal on her debut, a 3-2 overtime victory against PWHL Ottawa. She was named First Star of the Week for the week ending February 25, 2024, after scoring a hat-trick in a 6-3 victory over Ottawa. She also scored the first-ever "jailbreak" goal for PWHL Montreal. On July 9, 2024, she signed a one-year contract extension with Montreal. During the 2024–25 season, she recorded three goals and six assists in 30 games. On June 17, 2025, she signed a one-year contract with the Toronto Sceptres.

== International career ==
Dalton was a member of Canada's U-18 national team in 2018 and has been invited to senior national team selection camps.

== Career statistics ==
			Regular season					Playoffs
Season	Team	League	GP	G	A	Pts	PIM	GP	G	A	Pts	PIM
2018–19	Yale University	ECAC	29	5	13	18	8	—	—	—	—	—
2019–20	Yale University	ECAC	32	12	24	36	16	—	—	—	—	—
2021–22	Yale University	ECAC	36	13	30	43	10	—	—	—	—	—
2022–23	Yale University	ECAC	33	14	22	36	8	—	—	—	—	—
2023–24	PWHL Montreal	PWHL	20	5	4	9	0	3	0	0	0	0
2024–25	Montreal Victoire	PWHL	30	3	6	9	4	3	0	0	0	0
2025–26	Toronto Sceptres	PWHL	30	1	9	10	6	—	—	—	—	—
PWHL totals			80	9	19	28	10	6	0	0	0	0
