= Emma Gentry =

American ice hockey player (born 2002)

- Born: October 23, 2002 (age 23) Alpena, Michigan, U.S.
- Height: 5 ft 11 in (180 cm)
- Position: Forward
- Shoots: Left
- PWHL team: Toronto Sceptres
- Playing career: 2020–present
Medal record
World U18 Championships
Gold medal – first place	2020 Slovakia

Emma Gentry (born October 23, 2002) is an American professional ice hockey player who is a forward for the Toronto Sceptres of the Professional Women's Hockey League (PWHL). She played college ice hockey at St. Cloud State University.

== Early life ==
Gentry was born to Natalie and Wesley Gentry. She attended Alpena High School in Alpena, Michigan, and played for the HoneyBaked program.

== Playing career ==
=== College ===
Gentry began her collegiate career for St. Cloud State University during the 2020–21 season. During her freshman year, she recorded six goals and one assist in 16 games. She led the team with three game-winning goals. On December 10, 2020, she scored her first career goal and assist, in a game against Bemidji State. She was subsequently named the WCHA Rookie of the Week. During the 2021–22 season, in her sophomore year, she recorded 15 goals and eight assists in 33 games, and led the team with 145 shots on goal. During the 2022–23 season, in her junior year, she recorded 13 goals and nine assists in 36 games, and ranked second on the team with 116 shots on goal. During the 2023–24 season, in her senior year, she recorded 12 goals and six assists in 31 games. During the 2024–25 season, as a graduate student, she recorded 13 goals and seven assists in 36 games. She finished her collegiate career with 59 goals and 31 assists in 152 games.

=== Professional ===
On June 24, 2025, Gentry was drafted in the second round, 11th overall, by the Toronto Sceptres in the 2025 PWHL Draft. On August 12, 2025, she signed a two-year contract with the Sceptres.

== International play ==
Gentry represented the United States at the 2020 IIHF World Women's U18 Championship where she recorded one goal in five games and won a gold medal.

== Career statistics ==
=== Regular season and playoffs ===
			Regular season					Playoffs
Season	Team	League	GP	G	A	Pts	PIM	GP	G	A	Pts	PIM
2020–21	St. Cloud State University	WCHA	16	6	1	7	12	—	—	—	—	—
2021–22	St. Cloud State University	WCHA	33	15	8	23	26	—	—	—	—	—
2022–23	St. Cloud State University	WCHA	36	13	9	22	47	—	—	—	—	—
2023–24	St. Cloud State University	WCHA	31	12	6	18	26	—	—	—	—	—
2024–25	St. Cloud State University	WCHA	36	13	7	20	33	—	—	—	—	—
2025–26	Toronto Sceptres	PWHL	27	1	1	2	14	—	—	—	—	—
PWHL totals			27	1	1	2	14	—	—	—	—	—

=== International ===
Year	Team	Event	Result	GP	G	A	Pts	PIM
2020	United States	U18	1st place, gold medalist(s)	5	1	0	1	2
Junior totals				5	1	0	1	2
