= Sara Hjalmarsson =

Swedish ice hockey player (born 1998)

- Born: 8 February 1998 (age 28) Jönköping, Sweden
- Height: 1.76 m (5 ft 9 in)
- Weight: 72 kg (159 lb; 11 st 5 lb)
- Position: Centre
- Shoots: Left
- PWHL team Former teams: Toronto Sceptres; HV71; AIK Hockey; Linköping HC
- National team: Sweden
- Playing career: 2012–present
Medal record
World Championship
Bronze medal – third place	2026 Denmark

Sara Hjalmarsson (born 8 February 1998) is a Swedish ice hockey player for the Toronto Sceptres of the Professional Women's Hockey League (PWHL) and member of the Swedish national team. She previously played for Linköping HC of the Swedish Women's Hockey League (SDHL).

== Playing career ==
Hjalmarssom hails from Bankeryd, Sweden and attended Solna Gymnasium for secondary school. She played with HV71 during 2012 to 2014 and with AIK Hockey during 2014 to 2018.

=== College ===
Her college ice hockey career spanned five seasons with the Providence Friars women's ice hockey program in the Hockey East (WHEA) conference of the NCAA Division I. As a forward with the Friars, she scored 17 goals, and 11 assists in the 2019–20 season, to lead the team in goals scored and tied for points. She was named the Hockey East Player of the Week on 2 December 2019, for having scored six points in the Friar's Mayor's Cup game against the Brown Bears, the most points in a game by any NCAA player to that point in the season.

=== Professional ===
On November 20, 2025, she signed a one-year contract with the Toronto Sceptres of the PWHL.

== International play ==
Hjalmarsson represented Sweden in the women's ice hockey tournament at the 2018 Winter Olympics in PyeongChang, the women's ice hockey tournament at the 2022 Winter Olympics in Beijing, and at the IIHF Women's World Championships in 2017, 2019, and 2022.

On 12 January 2026, she was named to Sweden's roster to compete at the 2026 Winter Olympics.

== Awards and honors ==
- 2020–21 Hockey East Second Team All-Star
