= Toronto Sceptres =

Women's professional ice hockey team

- City: Toronto, Ontario
- League: PWHL
- Conference: Eastern
- Founded: 2023
- Home arena: Coca-Cola Coliseum
- Colours: Blue, navy, gold, yellow
- Owner: Mark Walter Group
- General manager: Gina Kingsbury
- Head coach: Pascal Rhéaume
- Captain: Blayre Turnbull
- Website: toronto.thepwhl.com

Championships
- Regular season titles: 1 (2023–24)
- Walter Cups: 0

Current uniform

The Toronto Sceptres are a professional ice hockey team based in Toronto that competes in the Professional Women's Hockey League (PWHL). They are one of the six charter franchises of the league. The team plays its home games at Coca-Cola Coliseum. Toronto topped the standings in the league's inaugural regular season.

== History ==
=== Founding and inaugural season ===
On August 29, 2023, it was announced that Toronto would be home to one of the PWHL's first six franchises. This ensured the continuation of professional women's hockey in the city after the folding of the Toronto Six and the Premier Hockey Federation earlier that summer—the Six were that league's final champions. The PWHL announced on September 1 that Gina Kingsbury, the former vice president of hockey operations at Hockey Canada and general manager of the Canadian women's national team, would be the PWHL Toronto's general manager. On September 15, Troy Ryan, the head coach of the Canadian women's national team, was announced as the team's first head coach.

Toronto's first three players—Canadian national team members Sarah Nurse, Renata Fast and Blayre Turnbull—were signed to three-year deals on September 5, 2023. The team selected 15 players at the inaugural PWHL draft on September 18; the team's first pick, at second overall, was veteran Canadian national team defender Jocelyne Larocque. Ahead of the start of the inaugural season, Turnbull was named team captain, with Fast and Larocque to serve as assistant captains.

In November 2023, it was announced that the team's colours would be blue, black, and white. The same month, it was announced that the Mattamy Athletic Centre in the old Maple Leaf Gardens would become the team's home.

On January 1, 2024, Toronto hosted the first ever PWHL game at Mattamy, with visiting PWHL New York posting a 4–0 victory over Toronto. The teams faced each other again on January 5, with Toronto securing its first win by a score of 3–2; Natalie Spooner scored the first goal in team history in the second period. On February 16, Toronto hosted its first game at Scotiabank Arena against PWHL Montreal, a match dubbed by the league as "The Battle on Bay Street". The game set a league and women's hockey attendance record with a sellout crowd of 19,285, beating the previous record of 18,013 set at the 2013 IIHF Women's World Championship. Two months later, on April 20, Montreal hosted Toronto at the Bell Centre, selling out the arena and setting another new attendance record at 21,105 in a game known as "The Duel at the Top" because the two teams were vying for first place.

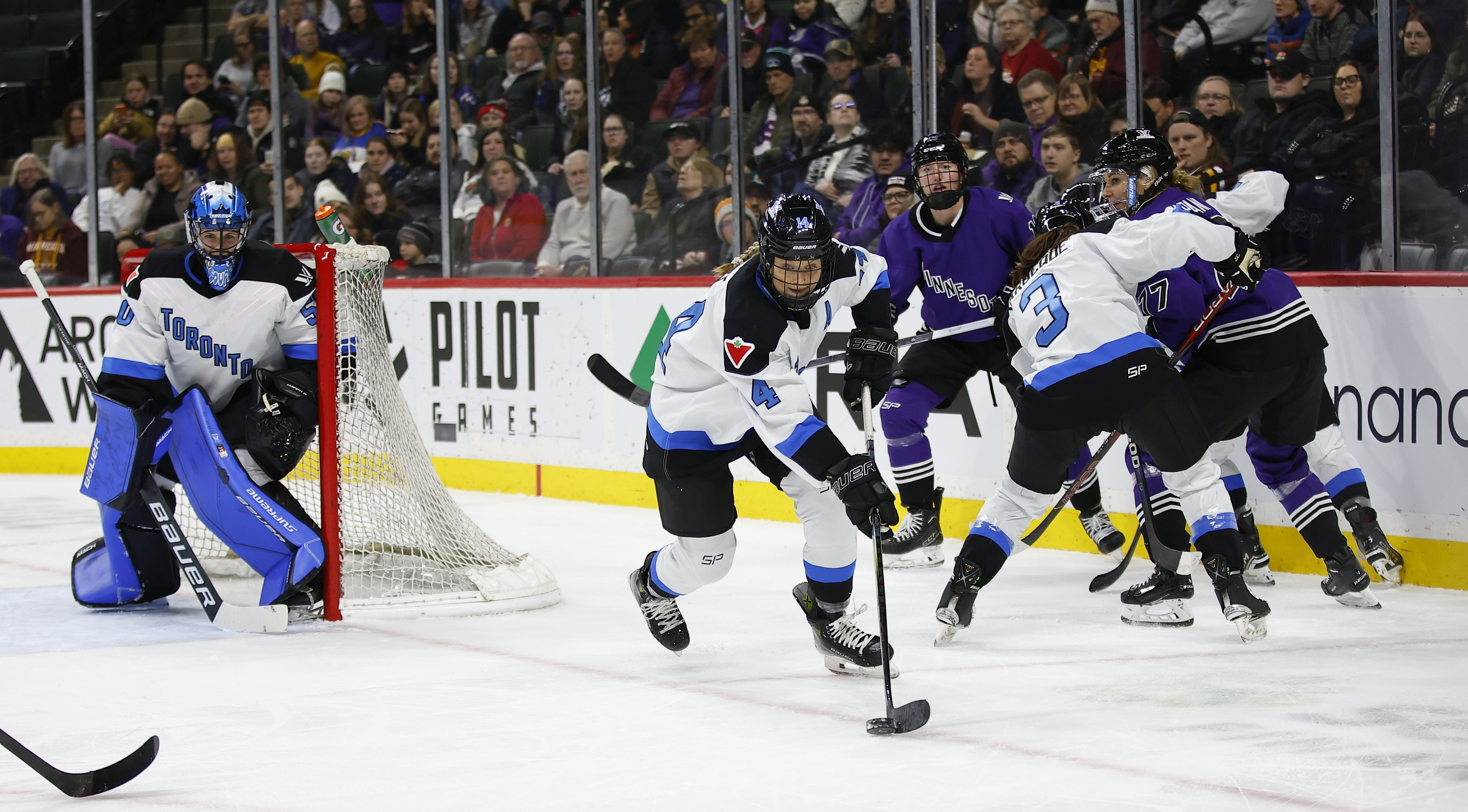
Toronto in action against PWHL Minnesota in 2024

Toronto became the first team to clinch a playoff spot, and clinched first overall on May 1. Spooner led the league in both goals and points. On April 30, 2024, it was announced that PWHL Toronto would relocate from Mattamy Athletic Centre to Coca-Cola Coliseum to host its playoff games. Toronto elected to play PWHL Minnesota in the first round of the playoffs and hosted them for their inaugural playoff game on May 8; Toronto won 4–0 in front of a sold-out crowd. Despite winning the first two games at home, Toronto went on to lose three straight and the series and were eliminated from playoff contention.

After the season, Spooner was named the league's first winner of the Billie Jean King MVP award; she was also named the league's top forward. Kristen Campbell won top goaltender honours, while Troy Ryan was named coach of the year.

On September 3, 2024, Coca-Cola Coliseum was officially announced as PWHL Toronto's primary venue for the 2024–25 PWHL season.

On May 21, it was announced that they had begun the search for a new head coach. Former head coach Troy Ryan left Toronto to be general manager and coach of the San Jose Sea Lions.

On June 10, it was officially announced that Pascal Rhéaume, younger brother of the Detroit Clutch's general manager Manon Rhéaume, would be the new head coach.

== Season-by-season record ==
Key of colours and symbols
Colour/symbol	Explanation
†	Indicates league championship
*	Indicates regular season championship

Year by year results
Season	GP	RW	OW	OL	RL	Pts	GF	GA	GD	Finish	Playoffs
2023–24 *	24	13	4	0	7	47	69	50	+19	1st	Lost semifinal, 2–3 (PWHL Minnesota)
2024–25	30	12	3	6	9	48	73	73	0	2nd	Lost semifinal, 1–3 (Minnesota Frost)
2025–26	30	10	1	6	13	38	51	72	−21	5th	Did not qualify

== Team identity ==
Inaugural season logo for PWHL Toronto

Uniform worn by PWHL Toronto in the league's inaugural season

Like all six charter PWHL franchises, Toronto operated without unique branding for the league's inaugural season—the team was known as PWHL Toronto and wore a league-wide jersey template that featured the city's name diagonally on the front. The team did have its own colour scheme, featuring blue and black. In October 2023, the league registered a trademark for the name Toronto Torch. However, when the league unveiled franchise names in September 2024, Toronto was named the Sceptres, referencing the city's regal history; Toronto was once known as the Queen City. The Hockey News reported that other names in contention for Toronto included the Sentinels and the Tempest.

In addition to the Sceptres moniker, the team's logo was unveiled as stylized "TS" initials, and yellow was added to the team's colour scheme.

== Players and personnel ==
=== Current roster ===
As of July 18, 2026

No.	Nat	Player	Pos	S/G	Age	Acquired	Birthplace
	(United States)	Grace Campbell	G	L	23	2026	Kensington, Maryland
42	(Canada)	Claire Dalton	F	R	26	2025	Toronto, Ontario
	(Canada)	Brooke Disher	D	L	22	2026	Fort St. John, British Columbia
14	(Canada)	Renata Fast (A)	D	R	32	2023	Hamilton, Ontario
6	(United States)	Kali Flanagan	D	R	31	2023	Burlington, Massachusetts
20	(United States)	Emma Gentry	F	L	24	2025	Alpena, Michigan
19	(Sweden)	Sara Hjalmarsson (RFA)	F	L	28	2025	Bankeryd, Sweden
1	(Canada)	Raygan Kirk	G	L	25	2024	Ste. Anne, Manitoba
2	(Canada)	Jessica Kondas	D	R	26	2023	Calgary, Alberta
	(United States)	Jane Kuehl	F	R	23	2026	Edina, Minnesota
91	(Canada)	Jessie McPherson	G	L	23	2025	Chatham, Ontario
12	(Canada)	Allie Munroe (A)	D	L	29	2023	Yarmouth, Nova Scotia
	(United States)	Jamie Nelson	F	L	24	2026	Andover, Minnesota
	(United States)	Emerson O'Leary	F	R	22	2026	Southborough, Massachusetts
47	(Canada)	Jamie Lee Rattray	F	L	34	2026	Kanata, Ontario
	(Canada)	Alyssa Regalado	D	L	22	2026	Mississauga, Ontario
17	(Canada)	Ella Shelton	D	L	28	2025	Ingersoll, Ontario
	(United States)	Kirsten Simms	F	R	22	2026	Plymouth, Michigan
24	(Canada)	Natalie Spooner	F	R	36	2023	Scarborough, Ontario
40	(Canada)	Blayre Turnbull (C) (UFA)	F	R	33	2023	Stellarton, Nova Scotia
25	(United States)	Clara Van Wieren (RFA)	F	L	24	2025	Cooperstown, New York
67	(Canada)	Emma Woods	F	R	30	2024	Burford, Ontario
11	(United States)	Kiara Zanon (RFA)	F	L	24	2025	Fairport, New York

=== Reserves ===
As of January 20, 2026

No.	Nat	Player	Pos	S/G	Age	Acquired	Birthplace
10	(United States)	Hanna Baskin	D	L	23	2025	Excelsior, Minnesota
16	(Canada)	Lauren Messier	F	L	23	2025	Burlington, Ontario

=== Team captains ===
- Blayre Turnbull, 2023–present

=== General managers ===
- Gina Kingsbury, 2023–present

=== Head coaches ===
- Troy Ryan, 2023–2026
- Pascal Rhéaume, 2026–present

=== First-round draft picks ===
- 2023: Jocelyne Larocque (2nd overall)
- 2024: Julia Gosling (6th overall)
- 2026: Kirsten Simms (8th overall)

== Awards and honors ==
2024:

- Natalie Spooner – Billie Jean King MVP Award
- Natalie Spooner – Forward of the Year
- Kristen Campbell – Goaltender of the Year
- Troy Ryan – Coach of the Year
- Natalie Spooner and Kristen Campbell – First Team All-Star Team
- Sarah Nurse and Renata Fast – Second Team All-Star Team

2024–25:

- Renata Fast – Defender of the Year
- Renata Fast – First Team All-Star Team
- Daryl Watts – Second Team All-Star Team
- Allie Munroe – The Intact Impact Award

Additional nominations:

- Emma Maltais – 2024 Rookie of the Year Award
- Troy Ryan – 2024–25 Coach of the Year Award
