= 2023–24 Ohio State Buckeyes women's ice hockey season =

WCHA regular season National Championship, W, 1–0 vs Wisconsin
- Conference: WCHA
- Home ice: The Ohio State University Ice Rink

Rankings
- USA Today: #1
- USCHO.com: #1

Record
- Overall: 35–4–0
- Home: 18–1–0
- Road: 14–2–0
- Neutral: 3–1–0

Coaches and captains
- Head coach: Nadine Muzerall
- Assistant coaches: Peter Elander; Kelsey Cline

The 2023–24 Ohio State Buckeyes women's ice hockey season represented the Ohio State University during the 2023–24 NCAA Division I women's ice hockey season. They were coached by Nadine Muzerall in her eighth season. The Buckeyes finished the season 35–4–0 and won their second national championship in program history.

== Offseason ==
=== Departing players ===
Player	Position	Class	Destintation
Brooke Bink	F	Graduated	
Alaina Giampietro	F	Freshman	Robert Morris
Teagan Grant	D	Graduated	
Jamie Grinder	D	Sophomore	Maine
Emerson Jarvis	F	Freshman	Quinnipiac
Gali Levy	F	Freshman	Brown
Sydney Morrow	D	Freshman	Colgate
Ramsey Parent	F	Graduated	

=== Players Drafted ===
Professional Women's Hockey League
Round	Player	Position	Team
2	Sophie Jaques	D	Boston
2	Emma Maltias	F	Toronto
8	Madison Bizal	D	Montreal
10	Paetyn Levis	F	New York

=== Incoming players ===
Player	Position	Class	Previous school
Jocelyn Amos	F	Incoming freshmen	
Cayla Barnes	D	Graduate	Boston College
Hannah Bilka	F	Graduate	Boston College
Jordan Baxter	F	Incoming freshmen	
Joy Dunne	F	Incoming freshmen	
Delaney Fleming	F	Incoming freshmen	
Kelsey King	F	Graduate	Minnesota State
Stephanie Markowski	D	Graduate	Clarkson
Olivia Mobley	F	Senior	Quinnipiac
Kiara Zanon	F	Senior	Penn State

== Roster ==
No.	Nat.	Player	Class	Pos	Height	DoB	Hometown	Previous team
1		Raygan Kirk	Senior	G	5' 8" (1.73 m)		Ste. Anne, Manitoba	Robert Morris
4		Stephanie Markowski	Graduate	D	5' 8" (1.73 m)		Edmonton, Alberta	Clarkson
5		Delaney Fleming	Freshman	F	5' 4" (1.63 m)		Rochester, Minnesota	Shattuck-Saint Mary's
6		Hadley Hartmetz	Graduate	D	5' 5" (1.65 m)		Phoenixville, Pennsylvania	Boston College
7		Emma Peschel	Sophomore	D	5' 10" (1.78 m)		Edina, Minnesota	Benilde-St. Margaret's
8		Makenna Webster	Senior	F	5' 3" (1.6 m)		St. Louis, Missouri	Wisconsin
9		Hannah Bilka	Graduate	D	5' 5" (1.65 m)		Coppell, Texas	Boston College
10		Jenna Buglioni	Senior	F	5' 3" (1.6 m)		Port Moody, British Columbia	Greater Vancouver Comets
11		Kenzie Hauswirth	Graduate	F	5' 5" (1.65 m)		Farmington, Minnesota	Quinnipiac
12		Jennifer Gardiner	Graduate	F	5' 6" (1.68 m)		Surrey, British Columbia	Greater Vancouver Comets
13		Riley Brengman	Senior	D	5' 5" (1.65 m)		China, Michigan	Detroit Belle Tire
15		Olivia Mobley	Senior	F	5' 9" (1.75 m)		St. Louis Park, Minnesota	Quinnipiac
16		Joy Dunne	Freshman	F	5' 11" (1.8 m)		O'Fallon, Missouri	St. Louis Lady Blues
17		Jocelyn Amos	Freshman	F	5' 7" (1.7 m)		Ailsa Craig, Ontario	London Devilettes
19		Lauren Bernard	Senior	D	5' 7" (1.7 m)		Madison, Ohio	Clarkson
20		Kelsey King	Graduate	F	5' 8" (1.73 m)		Elk River, Minnesota	Minnesota State
21		Kiara Zanon	Senior	F	5' 5" (1.65 m)		Fairport, New York	Penn State
22		Sloane Matthews	Sophomore	F	6' 6" (1.98 m)		Plymouth, Minnesota	Wayzata High School
23		Cayla Barnes	Graduate	D	5' 1" (1.55 m)		Eastvale, California	Boston College
27		Jordan Baxter	Freshman	F	5' 5" (1.65 m)		Coquitlum, British Columbia	Delta Hockey Academy
30		Amanda Thiele	Senior	G	5' 10" (1.78 m)		Milford, Michigan	Detroit Belle Tire
34		Lexington Secreto	Sophomore	G	5' 7" (1.7 m)		New Windsor, New York	CT Polar Bears
35		Quinn Kuntz	Senior	G	5' 7" (1.7 m)		Warroad, Minnesota	Warroad High School

== Standings ==
2023–24 Western Collegiate Hockey Association standings
	Conference										Overall					
	GP	W	L	T	OTW	OTL	SOW	PTS	GF	GA	GP	W	L	T	GF	GA
#1 Ohio State †	28	26	2	0	2	0	0	78	140	37	39	35	4	0	201	51
#2 Wisconsin *	28	23	5	0	2	1	0	69	124	43	41	35	6	0	205	62
#5 Minnesota	28	19	7	1	1	2	2	62	92	60	39	27	10	2	135	80
#7 Minnesota Duluth	28	15	11	2	0	0	0	47	64	47	39	21	14	4	89	66
#10 St. Cloud State	28	12	14	2	0	1	0	40	60	59	34	17	17	2	78	69
Minnesota State	28	6	22	0	1	2	0	19	52	94	38	13	25	0	97	120
St. Thomas	28	4	23	1	0	0	1	11	39	120	37	10	26	1	74	150
Bemidji State	28	3	24	1	0	0	0	10	33	144	36	4	30	2	42	181
Championship: March 9, 2024 † indicates conference regular season champion; * indicates conference tournament champion Rankings: USCHO.com; updated March 24, 2023

== Schedule and results ==
Date	Time	Opponent^{#}	Rank^{#}	Site	Decision	Result	Record	
Regular Season
September 29	6:00 pm	at #4 Colgate	#2	Class of 1965 Arena • Hamilton, NY	Thiele	L 2–3	1,200	0–1–0
September 30	3:00 pm	at #4 Colgate	#2	Class of 1965 Arena • Hamilton, NY	Kirk	W 3–2 ^{OT}	750	1–1–0
October 13	4:00 pm	at #6 Minnesota Duluth	#2	AMSOIL Arena • Duluth, MN	Thiele	W 5–2	956	2–1–0 (1–0–0)
October 8	2:00 pm	at #6 Minnesota Duluth	#2	AMSOIL Arena • Duluth, MN	Kirk	W 2–0	935	3–1–0 (2–0–0)
October 20	4:00 pm	at St. Thomas	#2	St. Thomas Ice Arena • Mendota Heights, MN	Kirk	W 6–2	481	4–1–0 (3–0–0)
October 20	4:00 pm	at St. Thomas	#2	St. Thomas Ice Arena • Mendota Heights, MN	Thiele	W 7–1	710	5–1–0 (4–0–0)
October 27	6:00 pm	#4 Minnesota	#2	Ohio State University Ice Rink • Columbus, OH	Kirk	W 4–3 ^{OT}	713	6–1–0 (5–0–0)
October 28	3:00 pm	#4 Minnesota	#2	Ohio State University Ice Rink • Columbus, OH	Thiele	W 6–5	617	7–1–0 (6–0–0)
November 3	7:00 pm	at Bemidji State	#2	Sanford Center • Bemidji, MN	Kirk	W 9–1	371	8–1–0 (7–0–0)
November 4	3:00 pm	Bemidji State	#2	Sanford Center • Bemidji, MN	Thiele	W 5–0	351	9–1–0 (8–0–0)
November 17	6:00 pm	#1 Wisconsin	#2	Ohio State University Ice Rink • Columbus, OH	Kirk	W 3–0	739	10–1–0 (9–0–0)
November 18	3:00 pm	#1 Wisconsin	#2	Ohio State University Ice Rink • Columbus, OH	Thiele	W 2–1 ^{OT}	761	11–1–0 (10–0–0)
November 24	6:00 pm	#6 St. Lawrence	#1	Ohio State University Ice Rink • Columbus, OH	Kirk	W 11–0	555	12–1–0
December 1	6:00 pm	#10 St. Cloud State	#1	Ohio State University Ice Rink • Columbus, OH	Kirk	L 1–2	468	13–2–0 (10–1–0)
December 2	3:00 pm	#10 St. Cloud State	#1	Ohio State University Ice Rink • Columbus, OH	Thiele	L 6–2	677	14–2–0 (11–1–0)
December 9	6:00 pm	Minnesota State	#1	Ohio State University Ice Rink • Columbus, OH	Kirk	W 6–1	575	15–2–0 (12–1–0)
December 10	6:00 pm	Minnesota State	#1	Ohio State University Ice Rink • Columbus, OH	Kirk	W 6–1	456	16–2–0 (13–1–0)
January 12	7:00 pm	at #2 Minnesota	#1	Ridder Arena • Minneapolis, MN	Kirk	W 7–0	2,387	17–2–0 (14–1–0)
January 13	3:00 pm	at #2 Minnesota	#1	Ridder Arena • Minneapolis, MN	Kirk	W 6–1	2,186	18–2–0 (15–1–0)
January 19	6:00 pm	#7 Minnesota Duluth	#1	Ohio State University Ice Rink • Columbus, OH	Kirk	W 3–0	768	19–2–0 (16–1–0)
January 20	2:00 pm	#7 Minnesota Duluth	#1	Ohio State University Ice Rink • Columbus, OH	Thiele	W 1–0	768	20–2–0 (17–1–0)
January 26	4:00 pm	at #10 St. Cloud State	#1	Herb Brooks National Hockey Center • St. Cloud, MN	Kirk	W 4–2	211	21–2–0 (18–1–0)
January 27	4:00 pm	at #10 St. Cloud State	#1	Herb Brooks National Hockey Center • St. Cloud, MN	Thiele	W 3–2	365	22–2–0 (19–1–0)
February 2	6:00 pm	Bemidji State	#1	Ohio State University Ice Rink • Columbus, OH	Kirk	W 11–1	485	23–2–0 (20–1–0)
February 3	3:00 pm	Bemidji State	#1	Ohio State University Ice Rink • Columbus, OH	Thiele	W 9–1	785	24–2–0 (21–1–0)
February 9	6:00 pm	at Minnesota State	#1	Mayo Clinic Health System Event Center • Mankato, MN	Kirk	W 3–0	135	25–2–0 (22–1–0)
February 10	3:00 pm	at Minnesota State	#1	Mayo Clinic Health System Event Center • Mankato, MN	Thiele	W 6–2	257	26–2–0 (23–1–0)
February 16	6:00 pm	St. Thomas	#1	Ohio State University Ice Rink • Columbus, OH	Thiele	W 12–1	779	27–2–0 (24–1–0)
Feb 16	3:00 pm	St. Thomas	#1	Ohio State University Ice Rink • Columbus, OH	Kirk	W 4–1	776	28–2–0 (25–1–0)
February 23	8:00 pm	at #2 Wisconsin	#1	LaBahn Arena • Madison, WI	Kirk	W 3–1	2,273	29–2–0 (26–1–0)
February 24	8:00 pm	#2 Wisconsin	#1	LaBahn Arena • Madison, WI	Thiele	L 2–4	2,273	29–3–0 (26–2–0)
WCHA Tournament
March 1	6:00 pm	Bemidji State	#1	Ohio State University Ice Rink • Columbus, OH (WCHA Quarterfinals)	Kirk	W 10–1	709	30–3–0
March 2	3:00 pm	Bemidji State	#1	Ohio State University Ice Rink • Columbus, OH (WCHA Quarterfinals)	Kirk	W 8–0	714	31–3–0
March 8	2:00 pm	vs. #8 Minnesota Duluth	#1	Ridder Arena • Minneapolis, MN (WCHA Semifinals)	Kirk	W 5–0		32–3–0
March 9	2:00 pm	vs. #2 Wisconsin	#1	Ridder Arena • Minneapolis, MN (WCHA Finals)	Kirk	L 3–6	1,518	32–4–0
NCAA Tournament
March 16	4:00 pm	#8 Minnesota Duluth	#1	Ohio State University Ice Rink • Columbus, OH (NCAA Columbus Regional)	Kirk	W 9–0	795	33–4–0
March 22	4:00 pm	vs. #4 Clarkson	#1	Whittemore Center • Durham, NH (NCAA Frozen Four Semifinals)	Kirk	W 4–1		34–4–0
March 24	4:00 pm	vs. #2 Wisconsin	#1	Whittemore Center • Durham, NH (NCAA Frozen Four National Championship)	Kirk	W 1–0	4,378	35–4–0
*Non-conference game. ^{#}Rankings from USCHO.com Poll. All times are in Eastern Time. Source:

== Rankings ==
Poll	Week																						
Poll	Pre	1	2	3	4	5	6	7	8	9	10	11	12	13	14	15	16	17	18	19	20	21	22 (Final)
USCHO.com	2	2	2	2	2	2	2	2	1	1	1	1	1	1	1	1	1	1	1	1	1	1	1
USA Today	2	2	2	2	2	2	2	2	2	1	1	1	1	1	1	1	1	1	1	1	1	2	1

== Awards and honors ==
=== National awards ===
HCA co-Goaltender of the Month (January 2024): Raygan Kirk

Julie Chu Women's National Rookie of the Year: Joy Dunne

Frozen Four Most Outstanding Player: Raygan Kirk

=== Conference awards ===
- Joy Dunne, WCHA Rookie of the Year
- Nadine Muzerall, WCHA Coach of the Year

=== Monthly awards ===
- Emma Peschel, Defender of the Month (October 2023)
- Joy Dunne, Rookie of the Month (November 2023)
- Hadley Hartmetz, Defender of the Month (November 2023)
- Hadley Hartmetz, Defender of the Month (January 2024)
- Raygan Kirk, Goaltender of the Month (January 2024)

=== Weekly awards ===
Forward of the Week: Jennifer Gardiner (Oct. 30, Nov. 20) Hannah Bilka (Feb. 5)

Defender of the Week: Hadley Hartmetz (Oct. 16, Nov. 27), Emma Peschel (Nov. 6), Cayla Barnes (Dec. 11), Lauren Bernard (Feb. 19)

Goaltender of the Week: Raygan Kirk (Oct.16, Nov. 20, Jan. 15, Feb. 26), Amanda Thiele (Jan. 22)

Rookie of the Week: Jocelyn Amos (Oct. 30, Nov. 27, Feb. 5), Joy Dunne (Nov. 6, Jan. 15)
