= 2024 WCHA women's ice hockey tournament =

2024 WCHA Women's ice hockey tournament
- Dates: March 1 – 9, 2024
- Teams: 8
- Finals site: Ridder Arena; Minneapolis, Minnesota
- Champions: Wisconsin (10th title)
- Winning coach: Mark Johnson (10th title)
- MVP: Casey O'Brien (Wisconsin)
- WCHA Women's Ice Hockey Tournaments

The 2024 WCHA Ice Hockey Tournament was the 25th edition of the WCHA Tournament. It was played between March 1 and 9, 2024. It was hosted by the University of Minnesota at Ridder Arena. As the tournament winner, Wisconsin earned the conference's automatic bid to the 2024 NCAA Division I women's ice hockey tournament.

== Format ==
The tournament includes all eight teams in the conference. Teams are ranked according to their finish in the conference standings. All quarterfinal games are best two of three and are played at the highest seed's home sites, and starting with the semifinals, single-elimination played at Ridder Arena. The tournament champion will receive an automatic bid into the 2024 NCAA Division I women's ice hockey tournament.

== Standings ==
2023–24 Western Collegiate Hockey Association standings
	Conference										Overall					
	GP	W	L	T	OTW	OTL	SOW	PTS	GF	GA	GP	W	L	T	GF	GA
#1 Ohio State †	28	26	2	0	2	0	0	78	140	37	39	35	4	0	201	51
#2 Wisconsin *	28	23	5	0	2	1	0	69	124	43	41	35	6	0	205	62
#5 Minnesota	28	19	7	1	1	2	2	62	92	60	39	27	10	2	135	80
#7 Minnesota Duluth	28	15	11	2	0	0	0	47	64	47	39	21	14	4	89	66
#10 St. Cloud State	28	12	14	2	0	1	0	40	60	59	34	17	17	2	78	69
Minnesota State	28	6	22	0	1	2	0	19	52	94	38	13	25	0	97	120
St. Thomas	28	4	23	1	0	0	1	11	39	120	37	10	26	1	74	150
Bemidji State	28	3	24	1	0	0	0	10	33	144	36	4	30	2	42	181
Championship: March 9, 2024 † indicates conference regular season champion; * indicates conference tournament champion Rankings: USCHO.com; updated March 24, 2023

== Bracket ==
Quarterfinals; March 1–3
8	Bemidji State	1	0	—
1	Ohio State	10	8	—
5	St. Cloud State	0	0	—
4	Minnesota Duluth	5	2	—
7	St. Thomas	2	1	—
2	Wisconsin	4	9	—
6	Minnesota State	5	1	0
3	Minnesota	4	7	3

Semifinals; March 8
1	Ohio State	6
4	Minnesota Duluth	0
2	Wisconsin	4
3	Minnesota	3

Championship; March 9
1	Ohio State	3
2	Wisconsin	6

Note: * denotes overtime period(s)

== Results ==
=== Quarterfinals ===
==== (8) Bemidji State at (1) Ohio State ====
March 1, 2024; 5:00 PM	Bemidji State	1–10 (0–3, 1–4, 0–3)	Ohio State	Ohio State University Ice Rink, Columbus, Ohio; Attendance: 709

Eva Filippova
Goalies
Raygan Kirk
Referees:
Gui Bradshaw
Craig Hedlud
Linesmen:
Tyler Iffland
Tim Katrinak

	0–1	3:39 – Barnes (Markowski, Bilka)
	0–2	5:44 – Dunne (Mobley, Matthews)
	0–3	5:48 – Baxter
Dronen – 24:27	1–3
	1–4	25:33 – Hartmetz
	1–5	28:38 – Buglioni (Peschel)
	1–6	35:08 – Bilka (Hartmetz, Barnes)
	1–7	35:40 – Amos (Markowski, Webster)
	1–8	40:51 – Gardiner
	1–9	44:23 – Buglioni (Zanon, Gardiner)
	1–10	51:35 – Barnes (Markowski, Matthews)

2 min
Penalties
4 min
13
Shots
62

March 2, 2024; 2:00 PM	Bemidji State	0–8 (0–3, 0–3, 0–2)	Ohio State	Ohio State University Ice Rink, Columbus, Ohio; Attendance: 714

Abbie Thompson
Goalies
Raygan Kirk
Referees:
Gui Bradshaw
Craig Hedlud
Linesmen:
Tyler Iffland
Tim Katrinak

0–1	1:13 – Gardiner (Zanon)
0–2	3:49 – Bernard (Zanon, Buglioni)
0–3	11:23 – pp – Buglioni (Barnes, Zanon)
0–4	32:15 – Matthews (Dunne, Webster)
0–5	33:10 – Dunne (Mobley, Bernard)
0–6	34:46 – pp – Baxter (Dunne, Gardiner)
0–7	46:09 – Bilka (Webster)
0–8	57:16 – Gardiner (Hartmetz)

8 min
Penalties
2 min
9
Shots
62

==== (7) St. Thomas at (2) Wisconsin ====
March 1, 2024; 6:00 PM	St. Thomas	2–4 (0–0, 1–2, 1–2)	Wisconsin	LaBahn Arena, Madison, Wisconsin; Attendance: 2,192

Calla Frank
Goalies
Jane Gervais
Referees:
Sarma Pone
Chris Brinkley
Linesmen:
Dan Kassis
Brenda Reinen

	0–1	0:49 – Simms (O'Brien, Harvey)
	0–2	11:43 – Eden (Potter, Curl)
Stenslie – 33:15	1–2
	1–3	50:05 – Simms (Wilgren, Curl)
Stenslie (Parent) – 53:00	2–3
	2–4	53:45 – Curl (Simms, O'Brien)

0 min
Penalties
4 min
13
Shots
31

March 2, 2024; 4:00 PM	St. Thomas	1–9 (0–1, 0–4, 1–4)	Wisconsin	LaBahn Arena, Madison, Wisconsin; Attendance: 2,273

Olivia King
Goalies
Ava McNaughton
Referees:
Sarma Pone
Chris Brinkley
Linesmen:
Dan Kassi
Brenda Reinen

	0–1	10:41 – Curl (Simms, O'Brien)
	0–2	21:35 – Eden (L. Edwards, C. Edwards)
	0–3	25:34 – O'Brien (Simms)
	0–4	26:58 – Wilgren (C. Edwards, Eden)
	0–5	28:49 – Jungels (Curl, O'Brien)
	0–6	40:06 – Curl
Jurgensen (Zavoral, Cooper) – 44:40	1–6
	1–7	48:25 – L. Edwards (Harvey, Gorbatenko)
	1–8	55:43 – Kotlowski (Wheeler, Picard)
	1–9	56:41 – O'Brien (Curl, Simms)

0 min
Penalties
0 min
14
Shots
60

==== (6) Minnesota State at (3) Minnesota ====
March 1, 2024; 6:00 PM	Minnesota State	5–4 (0–1, 2–1, 3–2)	Minnesota	Ridder Arena, Minneapolis, Minnesota; Attendance: 1,069

Hailey Hansen
Goalies
Skylar Vetter
Referees:
Robert Ludwig
Mike Kaehler
Linesmen:
Doug Durgin
Sam Jerome

	0–1	4:57 – O'Hara (M. Wethington, A. Wethington)
	0–2	11:00 – Huber (Wethington, Bouveng)
Bobyck (Paddington, Vekich) – 31:17	1–2
Nelson (Van Batavia, Vekich) – 38:13	2–2
Mashuga – 42:20	3–2
	3–3	45:31 – Huber (Bouveng, Murphy)
Nelson (Mashuga) – 49:04	4–3
	4–4	53:21 – Huber (Murphy)
Van Batavia (Akervik, Nelson) – 58:22	5–4

2 min
Penalties
4 min
28
Shots
29

March 2, 2024; 3:00 PM	Minnesota State	1–7 (1–5, 0–2, 0–0)	Minnesota	Ridder Arena, Minneapolis, Minnesota; Attendance: 1,226

Hailey Hansen
Goalies
Lucy Morgan
Referees:
Robert Ludwig
Mike Kaehler
Linesmen:
Doug Durgin
Sam Jerome

	0–1	4:24 – Bouveng (Huber)
	0–2	9:12 – Huber (Murphy, Stewart)
	0–3	11:02 – Bouveng (Murphy)
Langseth (Tuttle, Otremba) – pp – 14:14	1–3
	1–4	15:40 – M. Wethington (Huber, Bouveng)
	1–5	17:24 – pp – Murphy (Bouveng, Hemp)
	1–6	20:18 – Murphy (Bouveng, M. Wethington)
	1–7	36:03 – Kaiser (M. Wethington, Stewart)

14 min
Penalties
9 min
18
Shots
39

March 3, 2024; 3:00 PM	Minnesota State	0–3 (0–1, 0–0, 0–2)	Minnesota	Ridder Arena, Minneapolis, Minnesota; Attendance: 1,106

Suzette Faucher
Goalies
Lucy Morgan
Referees:
Mike Kaehler
Robert Ludwig
Linesmen:
Doug Durgin
Sam Jerome

0–1	2:33 – Huber (Bouveng, Murphy)
0–2	54:58 – Bouveng (Kaiser, Murphy)
0–3	57:00 – Bouveng (Laitinen)

4 min
Penalties
0 min
11
Shots
36

==== (5) St. Cloud State at (4) Minnesota-Duluth ====
March 1, 2024; 4:00 PM	St. Cloud State	0–5 (0–0, 0–2, 0–3)	Minnesota-Duluth	AMSOIL Arena, Duluth, Minnesota; Attendance: 527

Sanni Ahola
Goalies
Hailey MacLeod
Referees:
Scott Roth
Duncan Ryhorchuk
Linesmen:
Glendon Seal
Aaron Neville

0–1	22:38 – Hunt (Baskin, Wallin)
0–2	29:53 – pp – O'Brien (McMahon, Hunt)
0–3	44:30 – pp – Van Wieren (Hunt, McMahon)
0–4	54:04 – Wallin (Hunt, Henderson)
0–5	57:28 – Karlsson (Hunt, Van Wieren)

6 min
Penalties
6 min
20
Shots
39

March 2, 2024; 3:00 PM	St. Cloud State	0–2 (0–0, 0–1, 0–1)	Minnesota-Duluth	AMSOIL Arena, Duluth, Minnesota; Attendance: 1,113

Jojo Chobak	Goalies	Ève Gascon	Referees: Scott Roth; Duncan Ryhorchuk; Linesmen: Glendon Seal; Aaron Neville
0–1 / 36:15 – McMahon (Sadura, Bergström); 0–2 / 40:25 – McMahon (Sadura)			Referees: Scott Roth; Duncan Ryhorchuk; Linesmen: Glendon Seal; Aaron Neville
2 min	Penalties	6 min	Referees: Scott Roth; Duncan Ryhorchuk; Linesmen: Glendon Seal; Aaron Neville
27	Shots	23	Referees: Scott Roth; Duncan Ryhorchuk; Linesmen: Glendon Seal; Aaron Neville

== Tournament Awards ==
=== All-Tournament Team ===
- F: Casey O'Brien* (Wisconsin)
- F: Laila Edwards (Wisconsin)
- F: Kirsten Simms (Wisconsin)
- D: Caroline Harvey (Wisconsin)
- D: Emma Peschel (Ohio State)
- G: Ava McNaughton (Wisconsin)

* Most Outstanding Player
