= 2024 NCAA Division I women's ice hockey tournament =

NCAA women's ice hockey postseason tournament

2024 NCAA National Collegiate Women's ice hockey tournament
- Teams: 11
- Finals site: Whittemore Center, Durham, New Hampshire
- Champions: Ohio State Buckeyes (2nd title)
- Runner-up: Wisconsin Badgers (11th title game)
- Semifinalists: Clarkson Golden Knights (6th Frozen Four); Colgate Raiders (2nd Frozen Four)
- Winning coach: Nadine Muzerall (2nd title)
- MOP: Raygan Kirk (Ohio State)
- Attendance: 7,931, 4,378 for Championship Game

The 2024 NCAA National Collegiate women's ice hockey tournament was a single-elimination tournament by eleven schools to determine the national champion of women's NCAA Division I college ice hockey. This was the third year the tournament features an expanded field of 11 teams. The first round and quarterfinals were played on the campuses of the top 4 seeded teams on March 14 and 16, 2024, while the Frozen Four was played on March 22 and 24, 2024 at the Whittemore Center in Durham, New Hampshire. Stonehill and UConn each made the NCAA tournament for the first time in school history. For the second straight year, the Ohio State Buckeyes and Wisconsin Badgers met for the national championship, and Ohio State defeated Wisconsin 1–0 to claim their 2nd national championship.

== Qualifying teams ==
2024 Qualifying Teams
WCHA, ECAC, Hockey East, CHA, NEWHA

In the third year under this qualification format, the winners of all five Division I conference tournaments received automatic berths to the NCAA tournament. The other six teams were selected at-large.The top five teams are seeded.

Seed	School	Conference	Record	Berth type	Appearance	Last bid
1	Ohio State	WCHA	32–4–0	At-large bid	6th	2023
2	Wisconsin	WCHA	33–5–0	Tournament champion	18th	2023
3	Colgate	ECAC	31–6–1	Tournament champion	5th	2023
4	Clarkson	ECAC	32–4–2	At-large bid	12th	2023
5	Minnesota	WCHA	27–9–2	At-large bid	21st	2023
	Cornell	ECAC	24–7–1	At-large bid	9th	2020
	St. Lawrence	ECAC	27–10–0	At-large bid	10th	2017
	Minnesota Duluth	WCHA	20–13–4	At-large bid	15th	2023
	UConn	Hockey East	25–7–5	Tournament champion	1st	Never
	Penn State	CHA	22–12–3	Tournament champion	2nd	2023
	Stonehill	NEWHA	20–15–2	Tournament champion	1st	Never

=== Bids by state ===
Bids	State(s)	Schools
4	New York	Clarkson, Colgate, Cornell, St. Lawrence
2	Minnesota	Minnesota, Minnesota-Duluth
1	Connecticut	UConn
1	Massachusetts	Stonehill
1	Ohio	Ohio State
1	Pennsylvania	Penn State
1	Wisconsin	Wisconsin

== Bracket ==
First Round; March 14
UConn	0
Minnesota-Duluth	1**
Stonehill	1
Cornell	7
Penn State	0
St. Lawrence	1*

National Quarterfinals; March 16
Minnesota-Duluth	0
1	Ohio State	9
5	Minnesota	2
4	Clarkson	3****
Cornell	1
3	Colgate	3
St. Lawrence	0
2	Wisconsin	4

National Semifinals; March 22
1	Ohio State	4
4	Clarkson	1
3	Colgate	1
2	Wisconsin	3

National Championship; March 24
1	Ohio State	1
2	Wisconsin	0

Note: each * denotes one overtime period

== Results ==
=== First Round ===
==== Connecticut vs. Minnesota Duluth ====
March 14, 2024; 7:01 pm	Connecticut	0–1 2OT (0–0, 0–0, 0–0); OT: (0–0, 0–1)	Minnesota Duluth	Ohio State University Ice Rink; Attendance: 314

Tia Chan	Goalies	Ève Gascon	Referees: Amanda Tassoni; Paul Maciejewski; Linesmen: Michael Roberts; Coby Munson
0–1 / 97:13 – Mannon McMahon (Wallin, Jobst-Smith)			Referees: Amanda Tassoni; Paul Maciejewski; Linesmen: Michael Roberts; Coby Munson
4 min	Penalties	6 min	Referees: Amanda Tassoni; Paul Maciejewski; Linesmen: Michael Roberts; Coby Munson
33	Shots	49	Referees: Amanda Tassoni; Paul Maciejewski; Linesmen: Michael Roberts; Coby Munson

==== Stonehill vs. Cornell ====
March 14, 2024; 7:00 pm	Stonehill	1–7 (0–1, 1–5, 0–1)	Cornell	Class of 1965 Arena; Attendance: 215

Eve Stone
Goalies
Annelies Bergmann
Referees:
Nathan Shemo
Mackenzie McGuire
Linesmen:
Jodi Price
Mike Bontatibus

	0–1	18:49 – Rud (Yu)
Petford (Feeney, Parker) – 25:40	1–1
	1–2	26:21 – pp – Dwyer (Daniel)
	1–3	30:01 – Regalado – (Jockims)
	1–4	33:10 – Guilday (MacEachern, Schiff)
	1–5	33:37 – Daniel (Delianedis, MacEachern)
	1–6	39:39 – Guilday (Daniel, Regalado)
	1–7	40:41 – Van Gelder (Daniel, Prefontaine)

2 min
Penalties
0 min
12
Shots
55

==== Penn State vs. St. Lawrence ====
March 14, 2024; 7:00 pm	Penn State	0 – 1 OT (0–0, 0–0, 0–0); OT: (0–1)	St. Lawrence	LaBahn Arena; Attendance: 701

Katie DeSa	Goalies	Emma-Sofie Nordstrøm	Referees: Robert Ludwig; Mike Kaehler; Linesmen: Aaron Neville; Glendon Seal
0 – 1 / 69:35 – Bahl (Duscio, Segedi)			Referees: Robert Ludwig; Mike Kaehler; Linesmen: Aaron Neville; Glendon Seal
4 min	Penalties	2 min	Referees: Robert Ludwig; Mike Kaehler; Linesmen: Aaron Neville; Glendon Seal
36	Shots	44	Referees: Robert Ludwig; Mike Kaehler; Linesmen: Aaron Neville; Glendon Seal

=== Quarterfinals ===
==== (5) Minnesota vs. (4) Clarkson ====
March 16, 2024; 2:00 pm	Minnesota	2–3 4OT (2–1, 0–0, 0–1); OT: (0–0, 0–0, 0–0, 0–1)	Clarkson	Cheel Arena; Attendance: 2,041

Lucy Morgan
Goalies
Michelle Pasiechnyk
Referees:
Kelly Cooke
Courtney Drennon
Linesmen:
Evan Cooke
Laura Schmidlein

Bouveng – (Murphy, Wethington) – 7:26	1–0
Huber – (Bouveng, Murphy) – 8:47	2–0
	2–1	16:27 – pp – Winn – (Guay, Gosling)
	2–2	58:09 – Petrie – (Guay, Winn)
	2–3	125:44 – pp – Petrie – (Gosling, Winn)

8 min
Penalties
8 min
63
Shots
56

==== Cornell vs. (3) Colgate ====
March 16, 2024; 2:00 pm	Cornell	1–3 (0–1, 1–0, 0–2)	Colgate	Class of 1965 Arena; Attendance: 1,102

Annelies Bergmann
Goalies
Kayle Osborne
Referees:
Sarma Pone
Gui Bradshaw
Linesmen:
Doug Durgin
Sam Jerome

0–1	16:33 – Kaltounková – (Biederman)
1–1
1–2	55:49 – Simpson – (Biederman)
1–3	59:59 – en – Biederman

4 min
Penalties
2 min
20
Shots
34

==== St. Lawrence vs. (2) Wisconsin ====
March 16; 2:00 pm	St. Lawrence	0–4 (0–1, 0–0, 0–3)	Wisconsin	LaBahn Arena; Attendance: 2,273

Emma-Sofie Nordstrøm
Goalies
Ava McNaughton
Referees:
Chelsea Rapin
Dmitrii Antipin
Linesmen:
Kaitlin Hayes
Andrew Kirk

0–1	0:16 – O'Brien – (Simms, Edwards)
0–2	44:24 – Wozniewicz – (Potter, Picard)
0–3	47:52 – Edwards – (Simms, Potter)
0–4	50:54 – Edwards – (O'Brien, Simms)

6 min
Penalties
8 min
25
Shots
47

==== Minnesota Duluth vs. (1) Ohio State ====
March 16; 4:01 pm	Minnesota Duluth	0–9 (0–3, 0–4, 0–2)	Ohio State	Ohio State University Ice Rink; Attendance: 795

Ève Gascon
Goalies
Raygan Kirk
Referees:
Scott Prim
Alex Bergeron
Linesmen:
Jenny Cameron
Alex Walsh

0–1	0:22 – Amos – (Markowski)
0–2	13:25 – Mobley – (Bernard, Brengman)
0–3	15:53 – Bilka
0–4	20:29 – Bilka – (Dunne, Amos)
0–5	31:57 – pp – Hartmetz – (Webster, Peschel)
0–6	32:48 – Baxter – (Mobley, Barnes)
0–7	36:44 – Mobley – (Baxter)
0–8	44:29 – pp – Dunne – (Amos, Zanon)
0–9	54:46 – King – (Barnes, Markowski)

5 min
Penalties
3 min
16
Shots
39

=== Semifinals ===
==== (4) Clarkson vs. (1) Ohio State ====
March 22; 4:00 pm	Clarkson	1–4 (1–1, 0–0, 0–3)	Ohio State	Whittemore Center

Michelle Pasiechnyk
Goalies
Raygan Kirk
Referees:
Kelly Cooke
Dmitrii Antpin
Linesmen:
Kaitlyn Hayes
Andrew Kirk

Cherkowski (McQuigge, Guay) – 2:25	1–0
	1–1	13:53 – Webster (Buglioni)
	1–2	53:12 – Matthews (Brengman, Webster)
	1–3	57:00 – Dunne (Barnes, Gardiner)
	1–4	58:06 – en – Hartmetz

2 min
Penalties
0 min
18
Shots
53

==== (3) Colgate vs. (2) Wisconsin ====
March 22; 7:30	Colgate	1–3 (0–1, 0–0, 1–2)	Wisconsin	Whittemore Center; Attendance: 3,553

Kayle Osborne
Goalies
Ava McNaughton
Referees:
Chelsea Rapin
Courtney Drennon
Linesmen:
Evan Cooke
Laura Schmidlein

	0–1	11:00 – Simms – (O'Brien, Edwards)
	0–2	51:29 – Jungels – (Curl, O'Brien)
Kaltounková – (Brick, Greig) – 57:50	1–2
	1–3	59:48 – en – Edwards

8 min
Penalties
10 min
26
Shots
21

=== Championship ===
==== (2) Wisconsin vs. (1) Ohio State ====
March 24; 4:00	Wisconsin	0–1 (0–0, 0–0, 0–1)	Ohio State	Whittemore Center; Attendance: 4,378

Ava McNaughton	Goalies	Raygan Kirk	Referees: Sarma Pone; Gui Bradshaw; Linesmen: Glendon Seal; Aaron Neville
0–1 / 52:48 – Dunne – (Bilka, Barnes)			Referees: Sarma Pone; Gui Bradshaw; Linesmen: Glendon Seal; Aaron Neville
0 min	Penalties	0 min	Referees: Sarma Pone; Gui Bradshaw; Linesmen: Glendon Seal; Aaron Neville
26	Shots	28	Referees: Sarma Pone; Gui Bradshaw; Linesmen: Glendon Seal; Aaron Neville

== Tournament awards ==
=== All-Tournament Team ===
- G: Raygan Kirk*, Ohio State
- D: Cayla Barnes, Ohio State
- D: Caroline Harvey, Wisconsin
- F: Joy Dunne, Ohio State
- F: Kirsten Simms, Wisconsin
- F: Makenna Webster, Ohio State

* Most Outstanding Player

=== See also ===
- NCAA women's ice hockey tournament
- 2024 NCAA Division I men's ice hockey tournament
