= 2023 NCAA Division I women's ice hockey tournament =

NCAA women's ice hockey postseason tournament

2023 NCAA National Collegiate Women's ice hockey tournament
- 2023 Women's Frozen Four logo
- Teams: 11
- Finals site: AMSOIL Arena, Duluth, Minnesota
- Champions: Wisconsin Badgers (7th title)
- Runner-up: Ohio State Buckeyes (2nd title game)
- Semifinalists: Northeastern Huskies (3rd Frozen Four); Minnesota Golden Gophers (14th Frozen Four)
- Winning coach: Mark Johnson (7th title)
- MOP: Cami Kronish (Wisconsin)
- Attendance: 17,750, 3,940 for Championship Game

The 2023 NCAA National Collegiate women's ice hockey tournament was a single-elimination tournament by eleven schools to determine the national champion of women's NCAA Division I college ice hockey. This is the second year the tournament features an expanded field of 11 teams. The first round and quarterfinals were played on the campuses of seeded teams on March 9 and 11, 2023, while the Frozen Four was played on March 17 and 19, 2023 at AMSOIL Arena in Duluth, Minnesota. Penn State and LIU each reached the NCAA tournament for the first time in program history. The Wisconsin Badgers defeated the Ohio State Buckeyes 1–0 to win their 7th national championship.

== Qualifying teams ==
2023 Qualifying Teams
WCHA, ECAC, Hockey East, CHA, NEWHA

In the second year under this qualification format, the winners of all five Division I conference tournaments received automatic berths to the NCAA tournament. This is the first year the NEWHA received an automatic bid. The other six teams were selected at-large. The top five teams are then seeded.

Seed	School	Conference	Record	Berth type	Appearance	Last bid
1	Ohio State	WCHA	31–5–2	At-large bid	5th	2022
2	Minnesota	WCHA	29–5–3	Tournament champion	20th	2022
3	Colgate	ECAC	32–5–2	Tournament champion	4th	2022
4	Yale	ECAC	28–3–1	At-large bid	2nd	2022
5	Northeastern	Hockey East	33–2–1	Tournament champion	7th	2022
	Quinnipiac	ECAC	29–9–0	At-large bid	4th	2022
	Penn State	CHA	27–8–2	Tournament champion	1st	Never
	Wisconsin	WCHA	25–10–2	At-large bid	17th	2022
	LIU	NEWHA	20–13–3	Tournament champion	1st	Never
	Minnesota Duluth	WCHA	25–9–3	At-large bid	14th	2022
	Clarkson	ECAC	29–10–2	At-large bid	11th	2022

=== Bids by state ===
Bids	State(s)	Schools
3	New York	Clarkson, Colgate, LIU
2	Connecticut	Quinnipiac, Yale
2	Minnesota	Minnesota, Minnesota Duluth
1	Massachusetts	Northeastern
1	Ohio	Ohio State
1	Pennsylvania	Penn State
1	Wisconsin	Wisconsin

== Bracket ==
First Round; March 9
Penn State	2
Quinnipiac	3***
Clarkson	0
Minnesota Duluth	2
LIU	1
Wisconsin	9

National Quarterfinals; March 11
Quinnipiac	2
1	Ohio State	5
5	Northeastern	4
4	Yale	1
Minnesota Duluth	0
2	Minnesota	3
Wisconsin	4
3	Colgate	2

National Semifinals; March 17
1	Ohio State	3
5	Northeastern	0
2	Minnesota	2
Wisconsin	3*

National Championship; March 19
1	Ohio State	0
Wisconsin	1

Note: each * denotes one overtime period

== Results ==
=== First Round ===
==== Penn State vs. Quinnipiac ====
March 9; 6:01 pm	Penn State	2–3 3OT (0–1, 2–0, 0–1); OT: (0–0, 0–0, 0–1)	Quinnipiac	Ohio State University Ice Rink; Attendance: 402

Josie Bothun
Goalies
Logan Angers
Referees:
Robert Ludwig
Michael Kaehler
Linesmen:
Aaron Neville
Glendon Seal

	0–1	4:57 – Maloney
Zanon – (Wallin) – 33:31	1–1
Wallin – (Correia, MacKay) – pp – 35:48	2–1
	2–2	53:16 – Reilly – (Cooper, Mobley)
	2–3	109:37 – Chantler – (Mobley, Maloney)

6 min
Penalties
4 min
52
Shots
58

==== LIU vs. Wisconsin ====
March 9; 6:00 pm	LIU	1–9 (0–3, 1–3, 0–3)	Wisconsin	Class of 1965 Arena; Attendance: 227

Tindra Holm
Goalies
Cami Kronish
Referees:
Katie Guay
Laura White
Linesmen:
Michael Roberts
Colby Munson

	0–1	13:17 – Harvey – (Compher, Curl)
	0–2	16:24 – Curl – (Compher, Jungels)
	0–3	19:48 – Simms – (Eden)
Rourke – (Culp) – 23:08	1–3
	1–4	28:13 – pp – Wheeler – (Harvey, Shirley)
	1–5	35:46 – O'Brien – (Wheeler, Shirley)
	1–6	38:47 – pp – Edwards – (Curl, Eden)
	1–7	44:23 – Edwards – (Curl, O'Brien)
	1–8	46:25 – pp – Jungels – (Harvey, Simms)
	1–9	48:05 – Compher – (Edwards, Curl)

6 min
Penalties
2 min
7
Shots
59

==== Clarkson vs. Minnesota Duluth ====
March 10; 6:00 pm	Clarkson	0–2 (0–1, 0–0, 0–1)	Minnesota Duluth	Ridder Arena; Attendance: 342

Michelle Pasiechnyk	Goalies	Emma Söderberg	Referees: Kelly Cooke; Chelsea Rapin; Linesmen: Kaitlin Hayes; Laura Schmidlein
0–1 / 5:59 – Stewart – (Krause, Hanley); 0–2 / 43:23 – pp – Stewart – (Anderson, Fuhrman)			Referees: Kelly Cooke; Chelsea Rapin; Linesmen: Kaitlin Hayes; Laura Schmidlein
24 min	Penalties	2 min	Referees: Kelly Cooke; Chelsea Rapin; Linesmen: Kaitlin Hayes; Laura Schmidlein
16	Shots	27	Referees: Kelly Cooke; Chelsea Rapin; Linesmen: Kaitlin Hayes; Laura Schmidlein

=== Quarterfinals ===
==== Wisconsin vs. (3) Colgate ====
March 11; 3:00 pm	Wisconsin	4–2 (1–0, 1–1, 2–1)	Colgate	Class of 1965 Arena; Attendance: 1,349

Cami Kronish
Goalies
Hannah Murphy
Referees:
Katie Guay
Laura White
Linesmen:
Michael Roberts
Coby Munson

LaMantia (Kronish) – 7:01	1–0
	1–1	20:32 – Simpson (Brick, Gates)
O'Brien (Wheeler, Curl) – pp – 35:31	2–1
Jungels (O'Brien) – 51:57	3–1
Edwards en – 58:16	4–1
	4–2	59:50.3 – Kaltounková (Serdachny, Stewart)

10 min
Penalties
6 min
35
Shots
15

==== Minnesota Duluth vs. (2) Minnesota ====
March 11; 2:00	Minnesota Duluth	0–3 (0–0, 0–1, 0–2)	Minnesota	Ridder Arena; Attendance: 2,328

Emma Söderberg
Goalies
Skylar Vetter
Referees:
Kelly Cooke
Chelsea Rapin
Linesmen:
Kaitlin Hayes
Laura Schmidlein

0–1	30:39 – Wethington
0–2	43:22 – Murphy (Oden, Zumwinkle)
0–3	50:18 – Skaja (Wethington)

2 min
Penalties
0 min
30
Shots
30

==== (5) Northeastern vs. (4) Yale ====
March 11; 3:00 pm	Northeastern	4–1 (0–0, 1–0, 3–1)	Yale	Ingalls Rink; Attendance: 1,544

Gwyneth Philips
Goalies
Pia Dukaric
Referees:
William Jacques
Todd Plouffe
Linesmen:
Joshua Berenson
James Rogowski

Shannon (Irving) – 24:22	1–0
Aurard – (Carter, Müller) – 2:27	2–0
Müller – (Aurard, Murphy) – 9:37	3–0
	3–1	55:22 – Bargman (Ray, Hartje)
Murphy – sh, en – 19:20.6	4–1

4 min
Penalties
2 min
30
Shots
39

==== Quinnipiac vs. (1) Ohio State ====
March 11; 5:01 pm	Quinnipiac	2–5 (1–0, 0–2, 1–3)	Ohio State	Ohio State University Ice Rink; Attendance: 750

Logan Angers
Goalies
Amanda Thiele
Referees:
Robert Ludwig
Michael Kaehler
Linesmen:
Aaron Neville
Glendon Seal

Cooper (Mobley, Samoskevich) – pp – 18:58	1–0
	1–1	32:12 – pp – Rosenthal
	1–2	36:00 – Bernard
	1–3	48:08 – Peschel (Maltais, Levis)
	1–4	54:45 – pp – Jaques (Webster, Gardiner)
Samoskevich (Cooper, Steigauf) – 56:24	2–4
	2–5	59:31.2 – en – Jaques – (Gardiner)

6 min
Penalties
4 min
23
Shots
44

=== Semifinals ===
==== (5) Northeastern vs. (1) Ohio State ====
March 17; 2:30 pm	Northeastern	0–3 (0–1, 0–2, 0–0)	Ohio State	AMSOIL Arena; Attendance: 3,443

Gwyneth Philips
Goalies
Amanda Thiele
Referees:
Katie Guay
Laura White
Linesmen:
Colby Monsun
Michael Roberts

0–1	1:16 – Matthews – (Hauswirth)
0–2	31:18 – Webster – (Gardiner, Rosenthal)
0–3	38:44 – Hartmetz – (Maltais, Levis)

2 min
Penalties
8 min
15
Shots
53

==== Wisconsin vs. (2) Minnesota ====
March 17; 6:00 pm	Wisconsin	3–2 OT (0–1, 0–0, 2–1); OT: (1–0)	Minnesota	AMSOIL Arena; Attendance: 3,425

Cami Kronish
Goalies
Skylar Vetter
Referees:
Robert Ludwig
Michael Kaehler
Linesmen:
Glendon Seal
Aaron Neville

	0–1	3:23 – Heise (Oden, Boreen)
Edwards (Compher) – 6:32	1–1
Shirley (Wheeler) – 7:25	2–1
	2–2	58:49 – Zumwinkle (Wethington, Heise)
Harvey (Compher, Curl) – 76:47	3–2

6 min
Penalties
4 min
38
Shots
39

=== Championship ===
==== Wisconsin vs. (1) Ohio State ====
March 19; 3:00 pm	Wisconsin	1–0 (1–0, 0–0, 0–0)	Ohio State	AMSOIL Arena; Attendance: 3,940

Cami Kronish	Goalies	Amanda Thiele	Referees: Kelly Cooke; Chelsea Rapin; Linesmen: Laura Schmidlein; Kaitlin Hayes
Simms (Enright) – 13:28 / 1–0			Referees: Kelly Cooke; Chelsea Rapin; Linesmen: Laura Schmidlein; Kaitlin Hayes
2 min	Penalties	6 min	Referees: Kelly Cooke; Chelsea Rapin; Linesmen: Laura Schmidlein; Kaitlin Hayes
22	Shots	31	Referees: Kelly Cooke; Chelsea Rapin; Linesmen: Laura Schmidlein; Kaitlin Hayes

== Tournament awards ==
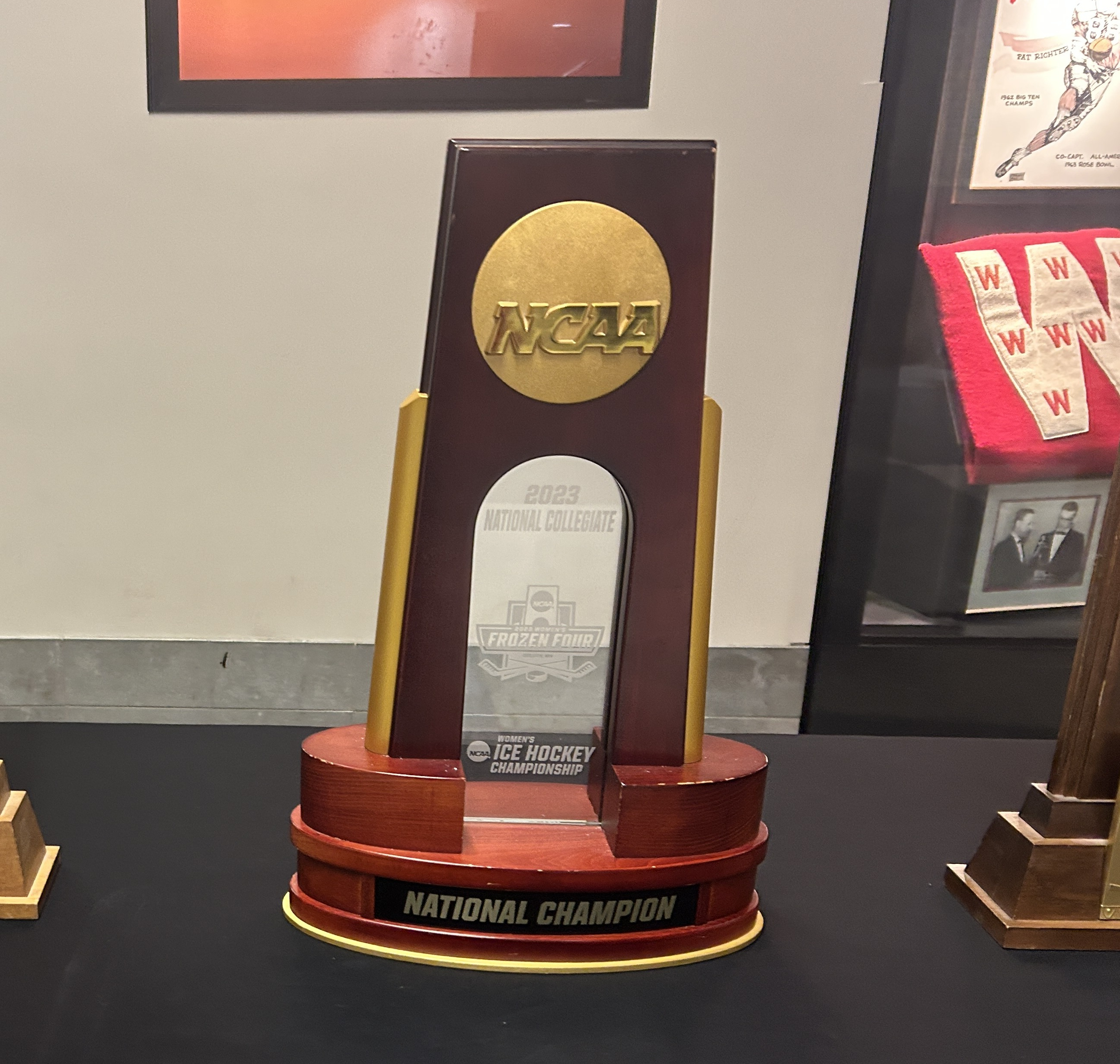
Trophy awarded to Wisconsin

=== All-Tournament Team ===
- G: Cami Kronish*, Wisconsin
- D: Sophie Jaques, Ohio State
- D: Caroline Harvey, Wisconsin
- F: Laila Edwards, Wisconsin
- F: Kirsten Simms, Wisconsin
- F: Jesse Compher, Wisconsin

* Most Outstanding Player

==== See also ====
- NCAA women's ice hockey tournament
- 2023 NCAA Division I men's ice hockey tournament
