= Jenna Buglioni =

Canadian ice hockey player (born 2002)

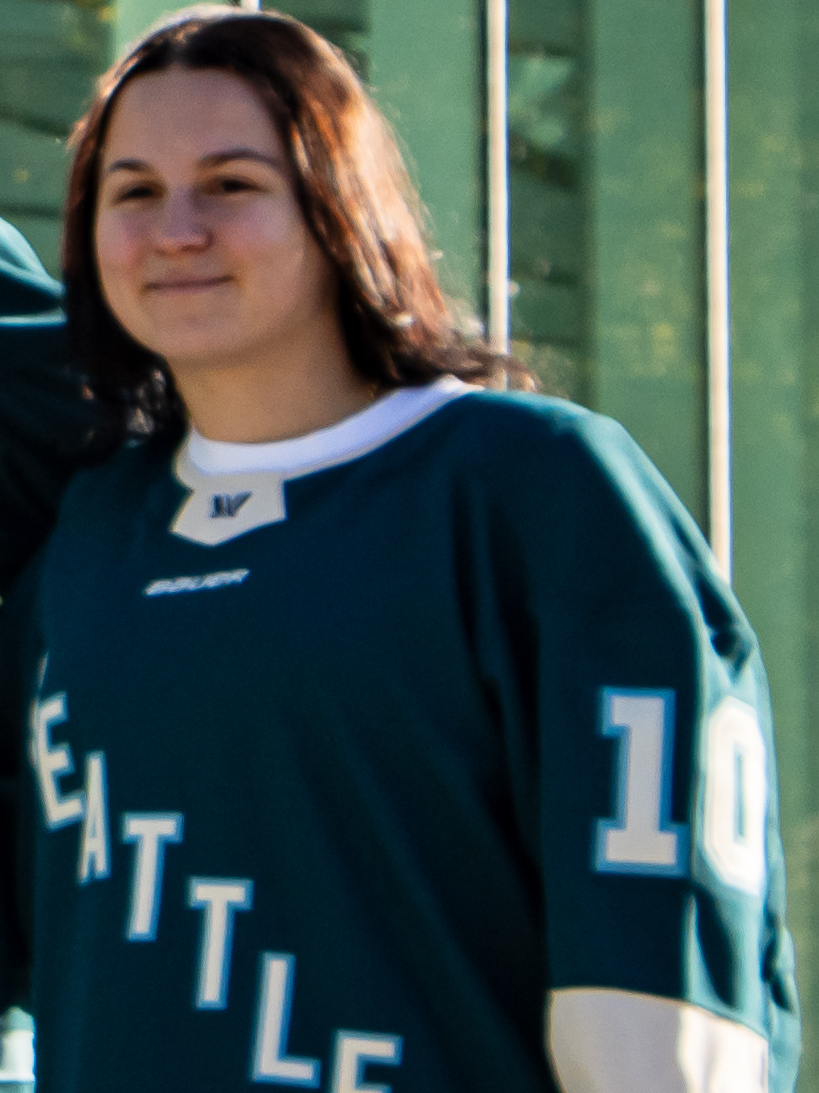
- Buglioni in 2025
- Born: March 13, 2002 (age 24) Port Moody, British Columbia, Canada
- Height: 5 ft 3 in (160 cm)
- Position: Forward
- Shoots: Right
- PWHL team Former teams: Ottawa Charge; Seattle Torrent (PWHL); Ohio State Buckeyes (WCHA)
- Playing career: 2020–present

Jenna Buglioni (born March 13, 2002) is a Canadian professional ice hockey forward acquired by the Ottawa Charge of the Professional Women's Hockey League (PWHL). Her first season of PWHL hockey was spent with the Seattle Torrent in their expansion season.

Buglioni played five seasons of college ice hockey at Ohio State from 2020 to 2025, serving as team captain in her final year. She helped the Buckeyes win two NCAA national championships (2022, 2024). She finished her collegiate career with 166 points in 170 games and set Ohio State program records for career game-winning goals (16) and single-season game-winning goals (7), while tying the program record for career short-handed goals (6).

== Early life ==
Buglioni was Born in Port Moody, British Columbia to Janine and John Buglioni, and has two siblings, Brennan and Rayna. She began her hockey career playing minor hockey in Port Moody, where she played alongside future NHL player Kent Johnson in the Port Moody Amateur Hockey Association at the atom level. After playing five years in a boys' league, she returned to girls' hockey with the Tri-City Predators.

Buglioni attended Gleneagle Secondary School, where she also excelled in field hockey and helped the Talons win district championships in 2016 and 2017. At age 16, she decided to give up field hockey to focus exclusively on ice hockey.

Buglioni played three seasons for the Greater Vancouver Comets of the BC Elite Hockey League (Female Midget AAA). In 92 games with the Comets, she recorded 87 goals and 98 assists for 185 points, becoming the all-time league points leader. She helped lead the Comets to three consecutive provincial titles. In the 2018–19 season, she was the league's second-leading scorer with 32 goals and 61 points in 26 games, forming a prolific scoring duo with teammate Jennifer Gardiner as the Comets posted an undefeated record.

In February 2019, Buglioni represented British Columbia at the 2019 Canada Winter Games in Red Deer, Alberta. She scored five goals in the tournament, including a hat-trick in Team BC's opening 6–1 victory over Alberta, and the lone goal in a 2–1 overtime semifinal loss to Alberta. In the bronze medal game, she assisted on Team BC's second goal in a 5–4 victory over Ontario to win the bronze medal in women's hockey.

== Playing career ==
=== College ===
Buglioni began her college ice hockey career at Ohio State during the 2020–21 season. On November 27, 2020, in Ohio State's home opener against top-ranked Wisconsin, she scored her first career goal with 40 seconds remaining in the first period, giving the fourth-ranked Buckeyes a 3–1 lead in an eventual 3–2 victory. On New Year's Day 2021, she recorded two goals and two assists in Ohio State's 4–1 victory over Bemidji State, then followed up with a goal and an assist in a 7–1 win the next day. She finished her freshman season with eight goals and seven assists for 15 points in 20 games. Following the season, she was named to the WCHA All-Rookie Team and WCHA Rookie of the Month for January 2021.

During the 2021–22 season, in her sophomore year, she recorded 18 goals and 26 assists for 44 points in 38 games, ranking fifth on the team in scoring. She recorded a 14-game point streak from September 24 to November 20, 2021, accumulating 25 points during that stretch, which tied for second in Ohio State's record book. On January 28, 2022, she assisted on the game-winning overtime goal in Ohio State's 2–1 victory over Minnesota. Ohio State won the 2022 NCAA National Championship, defeating Minnesota Duluth 3–2 on March 20, 2022, to capture the program's first national title. Following the season, she was named to the All-WCHA Third Team.

During the 2022–23 season, in her junior year, she recorded 12 goals and 15 assists for 27 points in 39 games. She ranked in the top ten on the team in points, goals, assists, shots (108), power play goals (4), and game-winning goals (2). On October 21, 2022, in a highly anticipated rematch of the 2022 national championship game, she scored both goals in Ohio State's 3–2 overtime victory over Minnesota Duluth, giving the Buckeyes their seventh consecutive win to start the season. She opened the scoring with a power play goal 1:29 into the second period, then scored the game-winner with 59 seconds remaining in overtime, recovering the puck at center ice and beating Minnesota Duluth goaltender Emma Söderberg one-on-one. She was named WCHA Forward of the Month for November 2022.

During the 2023–24 season, in her senior year, she recorded 15 goals and 23 assists for 38 points in 35 games. She led the team with three short-handed goals, the most in a single season by a Buckeye in nearly 20 years, and ranked second on the team with five game-winning goals. On February 3, 2024, she scored her first career hat-trick in a 9–1 victory over Bemidji State. Ohio State won the 2024 NCAA National Championship, defeating Wisconsin 1–0 on March 24, 2024, in Durham, New Hampshire, to capture the program's second national title. The championship avenged Ohio State's 1–0 overtime loss to Wisconsin in the 2023 championship game.

On June 17, 2024, Buglioni was named captain of the Buckeyes for the 2024–25 season, with Riley Brengman, Makenna Webster, and Amanda Thiele serving as assistant captains. On January 4, 2025, she scored the shootout-winning goal in the seventh round against Wisconsin in the Frozen Confines outdoor game at Wrigley Field in Chicago. One week later, on January 11, 2025, she scored a power play goal in a 4–0 victory over Bemidji State, becoming the sixth player in program history to reach 150 career points. The goal was also her 15th career game-winner, one shy of tying the program record. In her final regular season series, she sang the national anthem before the games against St. Cloud State. She finished her graduate season with 17 goals and 25 assists for 42 points in 38 games, leading the nation with seven game-winning goals.

Ohio State advanced to the 2025 NCAA National Championship game, facing Wisconsin for the third consecutive year. The Buckeyes held a 3–2 lead with 18.9 seconds remaining in regulation, but Wisconsin was awarded a penalty shot after a video review showed Ohio State covered the puck with a hand in the crease. They were ultimately defeated after Wisconsin's Kirsten Simms converted the penalty shot to tie the game and then scored again 2:49 into overtime to give the Badgers a 4–3 victory.

Buglioni finished her five-year collegiate career with 70 goals and 96 assists for 166 points in 170 games. She set Ohio State program records for career game-winning goals (16) and single-season game-winning goals (7), and tied the program record for career short-handed goals (6). She won two national championships (2022, 2024) and two WCHA regular season championships (2023, 2024) during her tenure. She graduated from Ohio State University with a Bachelor of Science degree in Sport Industry and Master's degree in Sports Management.

=== Professional ===
==== Seattle Torrent (2025–26) ====
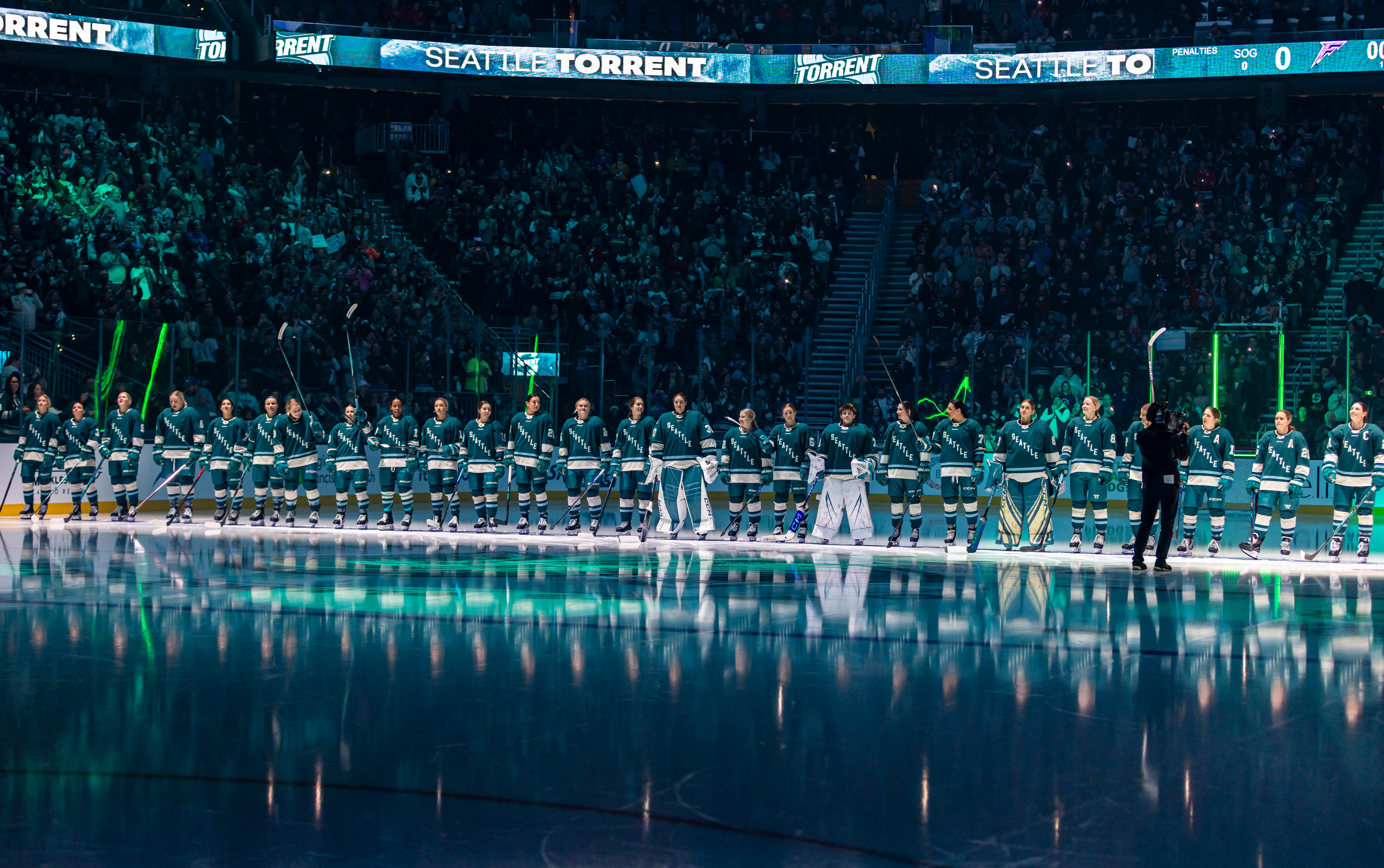
Buglioni with her Seattle Torrent teammates during the record-breaking home opener, November 2025

On June 24, 2025, Buglioni was drafted eighth overall by the Seattle Torrent in the 2025 PWHL Draft, becoming the franchise's first-ever draft pick. On July 15, 2025, she signed a two-year contract with Seattle through the 2026–27 season, becoming the first member of the Torrent's inaugural draft class to sign. Seattle general manager Meghan Turner praised Buglioni's game, stating: "Jenna is a cerebral player who excels in every zone and simplifies the game. She's solid on the faceoff dot, demonstrates patient puck support, and shows up in big moments. Her work ethic, positivity, and competitive attitude will have a big impact on our bench and in the locker room." Turner later described her as "a gritty player" who "plays big" despite her smaller stature, noting that "her playing style will fit perfectly with what we're building."

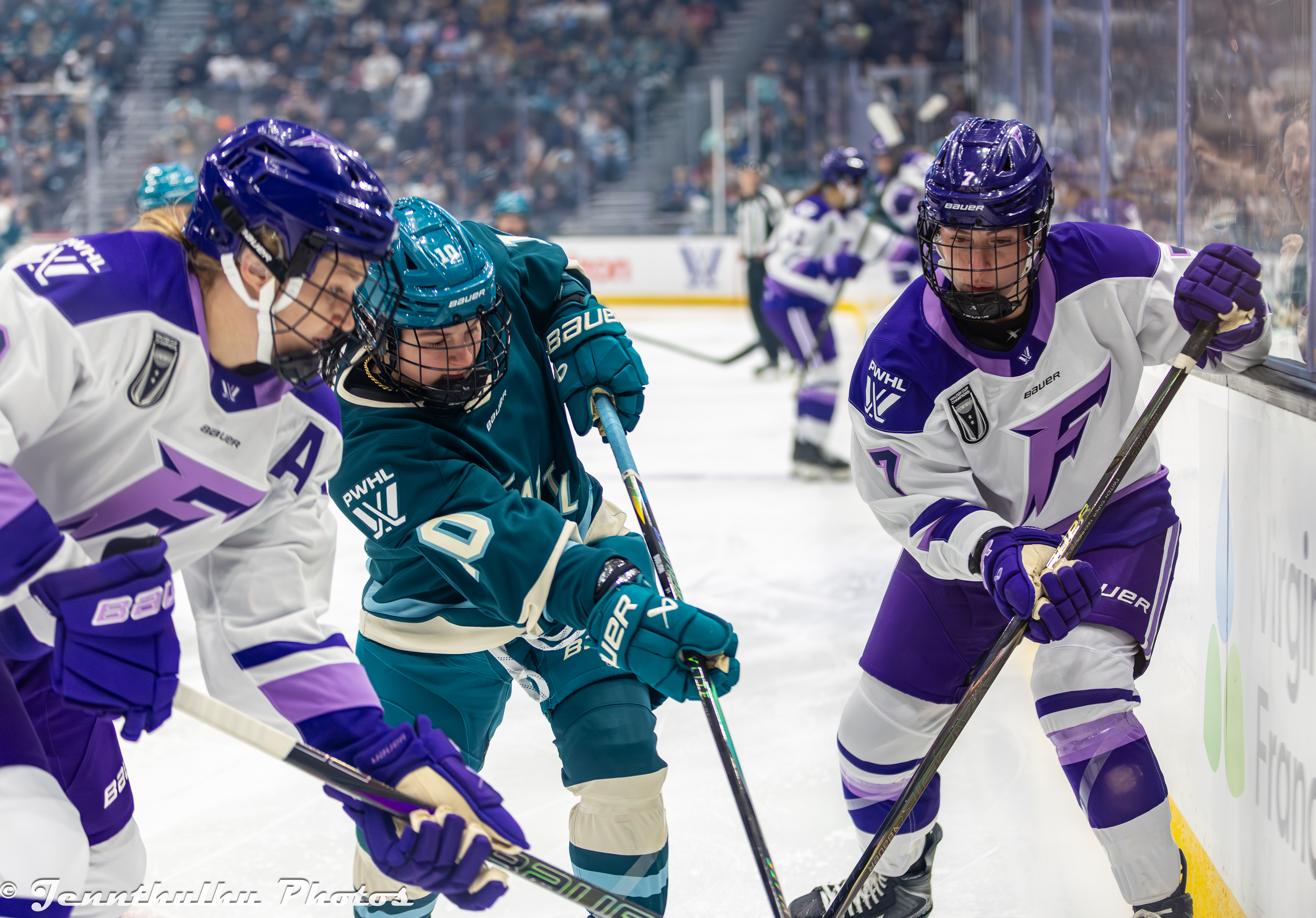
Buglioni with the Seattle Torrent

Buglioni made her PWHL debut on November 21, 2025, in Seattle's inaugural game against the Vancouver Goldeneyes at Pacific Coliseum in Vancouver, becoming the first player from nearby Port Moody, British Columbia, to play for the Torrent. The Torrent lost 3–4 in overtime before a sold-out crowd of 14,958. On November 28, 2025, she played in Seattle's inaugural home game at Climate Pledge Arena against the two-time defending Walter Cup champion Minnesota Frost. The game drew a record crowd of 16,014 fans, setting multiple attendance benchmarks: it established a new U.S. arena record for a women's hockey game, surpassing the previous record for a professional women's hockey game of 14,288, topped the previous Climate Pledge Arena record for a women's hockey game of 14,551 fans, and became the highest-attended primary home venue game in PWHL history. The Torrent lost 0–3 to Minnesota, with Seattle being shut out for over 118 minutes across their first two home games.

On December 3, 2025, the Torrent earned their first victory in franchise history with a 2–1 win over the New York Sirens at Climate Pledge Arena in front of 8,622 fans. Seattle became the first team to win a game in regulation during the 2025–26 season when trailing after two periods.

==== Ottawa Charge (2026–present) ====
On June 19, 2026, Buglioni was traded to the Ottawa Charge in exchange for Neena Brick, the fifty-ninth overall selection in the 2026 PWHL Draft.

== International play ==
Medal record

Representing Canada

Ice hockey

World U18 Championship
Silver medal – second place	2020 Slovakia	

On December 19, 2019, Buglioni was selected to represent Canada at the 2020 IIHF World Women's U18 Championship in Bratislava, Slovakia. During the tournament, she recorded one goal and three assists for four points in five games. In the gold medal game on January 2, 2020, Canada faced the United States in a hard-fought 77-minute battle. Canada lost 1–2 in overtime, earning the silver medal. Following the tournament, Buglioni and defender Kendall Cooper were named to the Media All-Star Team.

Buglioni was invited to Hockey Canada's national women's summer development camp in Calgary in 2021. She was one of eight British Columbia players and 43 total players from across Canada invited to the camp. In August 2022, she was invited to Hockey Canada's national women's development camp for the second consecutive year. She was also invited to attend Hockey Canada's national program selection camp along with four other Ohio State players in July 2022.

She participated in the 2023 Collegiate Series representing Canada against the United States, and has continued to participate in National Women's Development Team Series against the United States in 2023 and 2024, as well as the Women's Euro Hockey Tour in 2024.

== Career statistics ==
=== Regular season and playoffs ===
			Regular season					Playoffs
Season	Team	League	GP	G	A	Pts	PIM	GP	G	A	Pts	PIM
2020–21	Ohio State University	WCHA	20	8	7	15	14	—	—	—	—	—
2021–22	Ohio State University	WCHA	38	18	26	44	14	—	—	—	—	—
2022–23	Ohio State University	WCHA	39	12	15	27	14	—	—	—	—	—
2023–24	Ohio State University	WCHA	35	15	23	38	22	—	—	—	—	—
2024–25	Ohio State University	WCHA	38	17	25	42	27	—	—	—	—	—
2025–26	Seattle Torrent	PWHL	18	0	0	0	2	—	—	—	—	—
PWHL totals			18	0	0	0	2	—	—	—	—	—

=== International ===
Year	Team	Event	Result	GP	G	A	Pts	PIM
2020	Canada	U18	2nd place, silver medalist(s)	5	1	3	4	4
Junior totals				5	1	3	4	4

== Awards and honours ==
Honors	Year	Ref
College
WCHA All-Rookie Team	2012	
All-WCHA Third Team	2022	
AHCA Scholar All-American	2024	
International
IIHF World Women's U18 Championship Media All-Star Team	2020	
