= Casey O'Brien =

American ice hockey player (born 2001)

- O'Brien with the New York Sirens in January 2026
- Born: August 27, 2001 (age 25) Milton, Massachusetts, U.S.
- Height: 5 ft 4 in (163 cm)
- Weight: 135 lb (61 kg; 9 st 9 lb)
- Position: Forward
- Shoots: Left
- PWHL team: New York Sirens
- National team: United States
- Playing career: 2020–present

Casey O'Brien (born August 27, 2001) is an American professional ice hockey player who is a forward for the New York Sirens of the Professional Women's Hockey League (PWHL) and the United States national team. She played five seasons of college ice hockey at Wisconsin where she won three NCAA national championships (2021, 2023 and 2025) and the Patty Kazmaier Award in 2025. She finished her career as Wisconsin's all-time leader in points (274) and assists (177), with her 274 points ranking eighth in NCAA history.

== Early life and education ==
O'Brien was born to Erika and James O'Brien and has two older brothers, Jack and Max. Her mother played squash at Yale University while her father ran track and field at Bates College. She has two older brothers, Jack and Max, both of whom also played hockey. Max played hockey at Colby College, and O'Brien has cited him as her hero and inspiration for starting hockey.

O'Brien grew up in SoHo in New York City, where she began playing hockey at age four at Chelsea Piers. Her earliest hockey memories include waking up early with her father and brothers to drive to Chelsea Piers, stopping for donuts before heading to the rink. At age nine, her family moved to Milton, Massachusetts, a Boston suburb, to support her and her brothers' athletic development.

O'Brien attended Noble and Greenough School in Dedham, Massachusetts during her freshman year, where she led the team to a gold medal at the New England Championships with 42 points. She then transferred to Shattuck-Saint Mary's in Faribault, Minnesota for her sophomore year after attending a hockey camp there and being recruited by coach Gordie Stafford. During her sophomore year at Shattuck-Saint Mary's, she recorded 37 goals and 43 assists in 56 games. During her junior year, she recorded 52 goals and 42 assists in 49 games and was named the USA Today Girls Hockey Player of the Year. Her senior year was limited to 23 games due to double hip surgery for bilateral femoroacetabular impingement (FAI) with torn labrums in both hips, a condition her brothers Jack and Max also experienced.

== Playing career ==
=== College ===
O'Brien (left) and Wisconsin teammate Maddi Wheeler during Feb. 4, 2024 game

O'Brien played five seasons at the University of Wisconsin Badgers from 2020 to 2025, winning three NCAA national championships and finishing as the program's all-time leading scorer with 274 points. She began her collegiate hockey career during the 2020–21 season. During her freshman year, she recorded two goals and eight assists in 21 games, and helped the Badgers win the 2021 NCAA Division I tournament.

During the 2021–22 season, in her sophomore year, she recorded 27 goals and 28 assists in 38 games. She led the nation with nine game-winning goals and ranked third in program history. Following the season she was named a top-ten finalist for the Patty Kazmaier Award. During the 2022–23 season, in her junior year, she recorded 19 goals and 29 assists in 41 games, and helped the Badgers win the 2023 NCAA division I tournament.

O'Brien playing with the Badgers in March 2024

During the 2023–24 season, in her senior year, she recorded 23 goals and 50 assists in 41 games, and helped the Badgers finish as runner-ups in the 2024 NCAA division I tournament. Her 50 assists led the NCAA, and ranked first in single-season program history. Her 73 points ranked second in the NCAA, behind teammate Kirsten Simms' 75 points. She became the eighth player in NCAA Division I history to score 50 or more assists in a season. During the month of January 2024, she led the WCHA in points with 17, had five multi-point games, and recorded a point in every game during the month. She was subsequently named the WCHA Player of the Month. During the 2024 WCHA tournament she recorded 13 points and was subsequently named to the All-Tournament team, and tournament MVP. Following an outstanding season, she was named to the All-WCHA first team, USCHO Player of the Year, and a top-three finalist for both the Patty Kazmaier Award and WCHA Forward of the Year.

On May 8, 2024, O'Brien announced she would use her COVID-19 exemption and return to Wisconsin for a fifth year. On September 18, 2024, she was named co-captain for the 2024–25 season, along with Caroline Harvey. On October 5, 2024, O'Brien scored one goal and two assists in a game against Boston College to become the seventh player in program history to surpass 200 career points. During the first month of the season, she recorded two goals and six assists to lead the WCHA in scoring. She led the WCHA in assists (6), assists per game (3.00), total points (8) and points per game (4.00) and was subsequently named the WCHA Player of the Month for the month of September 2024. During October, she again led the WCHA in points (16) and assists (11) and was named WCHA Forward of the Month for the second consecutive month.

During the 2024–25 season, as a graduate student, she recorded 26 goals and 62 assists in 41 games. She led the nation in assists, points, and points per game (2.20). She recorded 17 goals and 35 assists in 28 conference games, and was named WCHA scoring champion. Following the season she was named the WCHA Player of the Year and Forward of the Year. She also won the 2025 Patty Kazmaier Award. On March 1, 2025, during the 2025 WCHA women's ice hockey tournament against Bemidji State, O'Brien recorded one goal and five assists, to become Wisconsin's all-time leading scorer, surpassing Hilary Knight's record of 262 career points. One week later, during the WCHA championship game against Minnesota, she recorded one goal and two assists, to become Wisconsin's all-time leading scorer, male or female, surpassing Mike Eaves' record of 267 career points. She finished her career as Wisconsin's all-time leader in points (274) and assists (177). Her 274 points rank eighth in NCAA history.

=== Professional ===
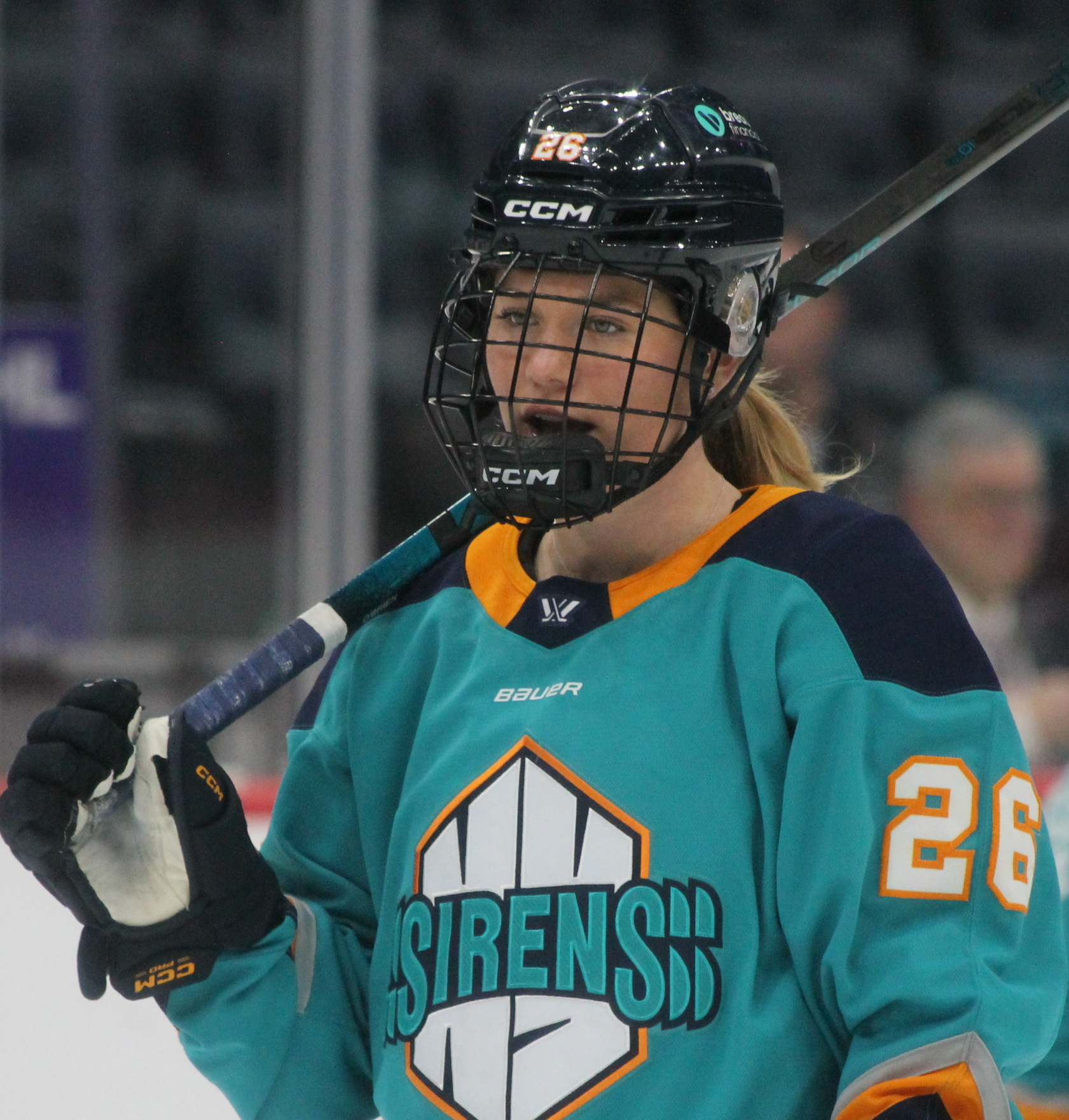
O'Brien with the Sirens in 2026

On June 24, 2025, O'Brien was drafted third overall by the New York Sirens in the 2025 PWHL Draft. The Sirens acquired the pick at the draft in a trade that sent Ella Shelton to the Toronto Sceptres. During the preseason, O'Brien led all Sirens rookies with three assists in two games while centering a line with reigning PWHL Rookie of the Year Sarah Fillier. On November 18, 2025, she signed a one-year contract with the Sirens.

After recording two assists in her first seven games of the 2025–26 PWHL season, O'Brien broke through on December 28, 2025, scoring her first hat-trick (three goals) against the Seattle Torrent during a PWHL Takeover Tour game in Dallas. She scored one goal in each period, including the game-winning power play goal with 3:20 remaining in the third period, as the Sirens rallied from a 3–2 deficit to win 4–3. The game was played at American Airlines Center in downtown Dallas in front of 8,514 fans, marking the southernmost PWHL game in league history. Following the hat-trick, O'Brien recorded her third assist of the season on January 2, 2026, in a 4–3 victory over the Montreal Victoire, giving her five points in her last four games.

== International play ==
Medal record

Ice hockey

Representing United States

World Championships
| Gold medal – first place | 2026 Denmark | |

World U18 Championship
| Gold medal – first place | 2018 Russia | |
| Silver medal – second place | 2019 Japan | |

=== Junior ===
O'Brien represented the United States at the 2018 IIHF World Women's U18 Championship in Dmitrov, Russia, where she recorded three goals and two assists in five games and won a gold medal. In the semifinals against Canada on January 12, 2018, O'Brien scored the game-winning shootout goal to help the United States overcome a two-goal third-period deficit and advance to the gold medal game with a 4–3 victory. She was named U.S. Player of the Game for her performance. The United States went on to defeat Sweden 9–3 in the gold medal game on January 13, claiming its fourth consecutive gold medal and seventh overall title at the tournament.

Representing the United States at the 2019 IIHF World Women's U18 Championship in Obihiro, Japan, O'Brien recorded one goal and two assists in five games. The United States defeated Finland 7–1 in the semifinals before facing Canada in the gold medal game on January 13, 2019. After trailing 1–0, the United States tied the game late in the second period and took a 2–1 lead early in the third before Canada equalized with 8:49 remaining in regulation. In overtime, the United States was assessed a holding penalty that gave Canada a 4-on-3 power play, and Canada scored 1:34 into the extra period to win 3–2 and claim the gold medal. The silver medal extended the United States' medal streak to 12 consecutive tournaments.

=== Senior ===
O'Brien made her U.S. senior national team debut during the Rivalry Series against Canada in December 2023. She returned to the national team for the 2024–25 Rivalry Series, appearing in the November 2025 games.

== Career statistics ==
=== Regular season and playoffs ===
| | | | Regular season | | | | | Playoffs |
| Season | Team | League | GP | G | A | Pts | PIM | GP | G | A | Pts | PIM |
|---|---|---|---|---|---|---|---|---|---|---|---|---|
| 2020–21 | University of Wisconsin | WCHA | 21 | 2 | 8 | 10 | 2 | — | — | — | — | — |
| 2021–22 | University of Wisconsin | WCHA | 38 | 27 | 28 | 55 | 16 | — | — | — | — | — |
| 2022–23 | University of Wisconsin | WCHA | 41 | 19 | 29 | 48 | 14 | — | — | — | — | — |
| 2023–24 | University of Wisconsin | WCHA | 41 | 23 | 50 | 73 | 12 | — | — | — | — | — |
| 2024–25 | University of Wisconsin | WCHA | 41 | 26 | 62 | 88 | 2 | — | — | — | — | — |
| 2025–26 | New York Sirens | PWHL | 28 | 7 | 15 | 22 | 2 | — | — | — | — | — |
| PWHL totals | | | 28 | 7 | 15 | 22 | 2 | — | — | — | — | — |

=== International ===
| Year | Team | Event | Result | GP | G | A | Pts | PIM |
|---|---|---|---|---|---|---|---|---|
| 2018 | United States | U18 | 1st place, gold medalist(s) | 5 | 3 | 2 | 5 | 0 |
| 2019 | United States | U18 | 2nd place, silver medalist(s) | 5 | 1 | 2 | 3 | 0 |
| Junior totals | | | | 10 | 4 | 4 | 8 | 0 |

== Awards and honors ==
| Honors | Year | Ref |
College
| Third Team All-WCHA | 2022 | |
| Second Team All-WCHA | 2023 | |
| First Team All-WCHA | 2024 | |
| USCHO Player of the Year | 2024 | |
| CCM/AHCA First Team All-American | 2024, 2025 | |
| First Team All-WCHA | 2025 | |
| WCHA Player of the Year | 2025 | |
| WCHA Forward of the Year | 2025 | |
| Patty Kazmaier Award | 2025 | |
PWHL
| All-Rookie Team | 2026 | |

Awards and achievements
| Preceded by Izzy Daniel | Patty Kazmaier Award; 2024–25 | Succeeded by Caroline Harvey |
