= Cami Kronish =

American ice hockey player (born 2000)

- Born: February 23, 2000 (age 26) New York, New York, U.S.
- Height: 6 ft 0 in (183 cm)
- Position: Goaltender
- Catches: Left
- PWHL team Former teams: Boston Fleet; AIK Hockey
- Playing career: 2018–present

Camryn "Cami" Kronish (born February 23, 2000) is a former American ice hockey goaltender for the Boston Fleet of the Professional Women's Hockey League (PWHL), and a current collegiate ice hockey coach for Harvard University's women's team. Kronish played college ice hockey for the Wisconsin Badgers women's ice hockey program, winning a national championship as the Badgers' starting goaltender in 2023.

== Early life ==
Cami Kronish is from New York City, but she attended high school at the North American Hockey Academy (NAHA), a private school which was then located in Stowe, Vermont. In Junior Women's Hockey League (JWHL) play, Kronish was a member of the NAHA's U-16 championship team in 2014–2015, and of the NAHA's U-19 championship teams in her final two seasons, 2016-2017 and 2017–2018. She was named to the JWHL All-Star team for both U-19 championship seasons, and was the JWHL Goaltender of the Year in 2017–2018.

== Collegiate career ==
Kronish was a member of the University of Wisconsin's women's ice hockey team, the Badgers, from 2018 to 2023; during her first four seasons, she played in only six games, starting in three. At the beginning of her senior year, Kronish shared time as goaltender with Jane Gervais; her success led to her becoming the team's primary goalie on November 19, 2022, and she started nearly every game for the rest of that season. During her senior year, the team reached the NCAA Frozen Four in the 2023 national championship tournament, where they defeated Ohio State University in the championship game, 1–0. Kronish was named to the all-tournament team and received the tournament's award for Most Outstanding Player. Kronish as named a WCHA Scholar-Athlete and an Academic All-Big Ten honoree for each of her final four seasons as a player.

== Professional career ==
In June 2023, Kronish signed with Swedish Women's Hockey League (SDHL) team AIK, playing in one game. In October 2023, Kronish accepted a training camp invite from PWHL Boston, and signed a one-year contract in December to play for Boston in the PWHL's inaugural season. Cami Kronish was cut from the Boston Fleet prior to the 2024-2025 season, as the final roster spot for a goaltender was taken by Klára Peslarová.

== International career ==
Kronish participated in the 2023 USA Women's National Team August Festival held in Lake Placid, New York. She also participated in development camps conducted by USA Hockey in 2016 and 2017, as well as USA Hockey goaltending camps in 2017 and 2023.

== Coaching career ==
Kronish served as a goaltending coach at the North American Hockey Academy in Boston and, following her success in that role, was named the goaltending coach for the Harvard Crimson women's ice hockey team in October, 2024.
