= Neena Brick =

- Born: November 20, 2003 (age 22) Regina, Saskatchewan
- Height: 5 ft 8 in (173 cm)
- Position: Forward
- Shoots: Right
- PWHL team Former teams: Seattle Torrent; Colgate Raiders
- Playing career: 2025–present

Neena Brick (born November 20, 2003) is a professional ice hockey forward acquired by the Seattle Torrent of the Professional Women's Hockey League. She played her college ice hockey with Colgate.

== Playing career ==
Brick played for Team Saskatchewan at the 2019 Canadian National Women's Under-18 Championships in Manitoba. In the semifinals versus Team Ontario Blue, Brick registered a goal and two assists in a 3-1 victory. With the win, Saskatchewan qualified for the gold medal game, resulting in their first appearance.

In the gold medal game versus Team Ontario Red, held in Winkler , Manitoba, Brick scored the only goal for Saskatchewan in a 3-1 loss. As a side note, the win marked Team Ontario Red's fifth consecutive gold medal.

=== College ===
During the 2023-24 season, Brick tied the Colgate program record for most goais in a game with four. She achieved the feat on November 11, 2023 in a 10-1 win versus the Harvard Crimson.

On February 14, 2025, Brick and Alexis Petford contributed multi point performances in a 3-0 shutout versus Yale. With the win, goaltender Hannah Murphy recorded her 19th career shutout, setting a program record.

Brick played in 147 career games for Colgate, recording 43 goals and 104 points.

=== Professional ===
After graduating from Colgate in 2025, Brick spent the 2025-26 season with MoDo Hockey Dam in the Swedish Women's Hockey League (SDHL). In 35 games played, she logged 19 points, ranking third in team scoring.

On June 17, 2026, Brick was selected fifty-ninth overall by the Ottawa Charge in the 2026 PWHL Draft. As a side note, Brick was among four Colgate alumnae selected in the 2026 PWHL Draft. Two days later, Brick was traded to the Seattle Torrent in exchange for Jenna Buglioni.

== Awards and honours ==
- ECAC Hockey All-Academic Team (2021-22, 2022-23, 2023-24)
