= Hannah Bilka =

American ice hockey player (born 2001)

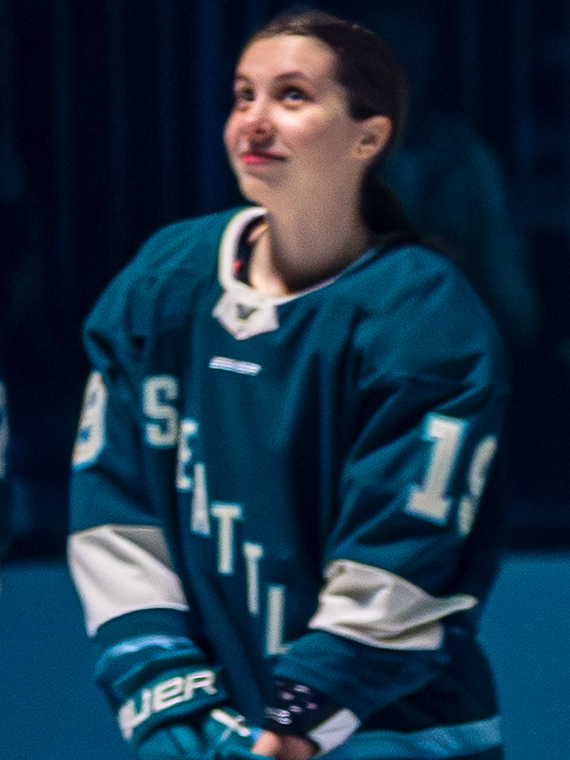
- Bilka with the Seattle Torrent in 2025
- Born: March 24, 2001 (age 25) Coppell, Texas, U.S.
- Height: 5 ft 5 in (165 cm)
- Weight: 130 lb (59 kg; 9 st 4 lb)
- Position: Forward
- Shoots: Left
- PWHL team Former teams: Detroit Clutch; Seattle Torrent; Boston Fleet
- National team: United States
- Playing career: 2019–present
Medal record
Olympic Games
Gold medal – first place	2026 Milano Cortina	Team
World Championships
Gold medal – first place	2023 Canada
Gold medal – first place	2026 Denmark
Silver medal – second place	2022 Denmark
Silver medal – second place	2024 United States
World U18 Championship
Gold medal – first place	2018 Russia
Silver medal – second place	2019 Japan

Hannah Bilka (born March 24, 2001) is an American professional ice hockey player for the Detroit Clutch of the Professional Women's Hockey League (PWHL) and member of the United States women's national ice hockey team. A native of Coppell, Texas, Bilka overcame the challenges of growing up in a non-traditional hockey market to become one of the top players in women's hockey. Bilka played college ice hockey at Boston College for four seasons (2019–2023), and was named the Women's Hockey Commissioners Association National Rookie of the Year in 2020. She transferred to Ohio State for her graduate season in 2023–24, where she led the team in scoring and helped the Buckeyes win the 2024 NCAA National Championship. Bilka is the first and only person from the state of Texas to win an Olympic gold medal in ice hockey.

Internationally, Bilka has represented the United States at multiple levels. She won gold and silver medals at the IIHF World Women's U18 Championship in 2018 and 2019, respectively. At the senior level, she has competed in three IIHF Women's World Championships, winning gold in 2023 and silver medals in 2022 and 2024.

Bilka was drafted fourth overall by PWHL Boston in the 2024 PWHL draft and signed a three-year contract with the team. After one season with Boston, she was selected third overall by the Seattle Torrent in the 2025 PWHL Expansion Draft, reuniting her with former Boston teammate and U.S. national team captain Hilary Knight.

== Early life and education ==
Bilka was born and raised in Coppell, Texas, to parents Dan and Patricia Bilka. She has three siblings: Christina, Stephanie, and Anthony. Bilka was inspired to play hockey by watching her older brother Anthony, who played Division III college hockey. She became passionate about hockey after watching the 2010 Winter Olympics.

Growing up in Texas, a non-traditional hockey market, Bilka faced significant challenges in pursuing the sport. Due to limited opportunities for girls' hockey in the area, she played on boys' teams alongside fellow Texas native Ally Simpson. Bilka had to be proactive in her college recruitment, emailing coaches directly since scouts were unfamiliar with girls competing in boys' tournaments in smaller hockey markets. At age 14, she left home to attend Shattuck-St. Mary's, a boarding school in Faribault, Minnesota, known for its elite hockey program. While at Shattuck-St. Mary's, she also played lacrosse and ultimate frisbee. She helped lead the Sabres to a Tier 1 U19 national championship in 2018 and a runner-up finish in 2019.

Bilka majored in communications at Boston College, where she was named to the National Honor Society and received The Hennessy Family Scholarship Fund and The Lombardi Family Scholarship Fund in Memory of Joseph J. Lombardi. During her time at Boston College, she worked as a statistician for the Boston College athletic communications office. She later pursued a master's degree in sport management at Ohio State University.

== Playing career ==
=== College ===
Bilka began her collegiate career for Boston College during the 2019–20 season. During her freshman year, she recorded 14 goals and 23 assists in 34 games. She led the team in points with 37, and led all rookies in the country in total points per game (1.13), assists per game (0.71) and shots on goal per game (4.06) during the regular season and tied for first in shots on goal (126). her 30 points in Hockey East play marked the ninth-highest total by a first-year player in league history. Following an outstanding season, she was named to the Hockey East Second Team, a unanimous selection to the Hockey East All-Rookie Team, and the USCHO All-Rookie Team. She was also awarded the Hockey East Rookie of the Year and the Women's Hockey Commissioners Association National Rookie of the Year.

During the 2020–21 season in her sophomore year, she recorded seven goals and nine assists in 19 games, in a season that was cancelled due to the COVID-19 pandemic. She ranked third on the team in scoring with 16 points and was subsequently named to the Hockey East Third Team. During the 2021–22 season in her junior year, she recorded 16 goals and 17 assists in 34 games. She ranked second on the team in points with 33 and led the team with a career-best plus-18 rating. Following the season, she was named to the Hockey East First Team, and New England Hockey Writers Association All-Star.

On August 19, 2022, Bilka was named a captain of the Eagles for the 2022–23 season. During her senior year, she recorded 12 goals and 29 assists in 34 games. She finished tied for fourth overall in conference scoring with 32 points, and 1.28 points per game. Her 24 assists in conference games tied for second most in the league. Following the season she was named a Hockey East Second-Team All-Star.

On March 25, 2023, Bilka announced she was transferring to Ohio State for the 2023–24 season. During her graduate transfer year she led the team in points with 22 goals and 26 assists in 39 games. During the 2024 NCAA Division I women's ice hockey tournament she assisted on the game-winning goal to help lead the Buckeyes to the national championship.

=== Professional ===
==== Boston Fleet (2024–2025) ====
External videos
- Draftee Feature: Boston's Hannah Bilka, PWHL

On June 10, 2024, Bilka was drafted fourth overall by Boston in the 2024 PWHL draft. On July 9, 2024, she signed a three-year contract with the team. During the 2024–25 season, she recorded five goals and six assists in 16 games before suffering an injury during the Rivalry Series. Despite her shortened season, she was recognized as one of the team's key rookies. On January 5, 2025, during the PWHL's Takeover Tour game at Climate Pledge Arena in Seattle, she recorded a goal and an assist in a game against the Montréal Victoire, which proved significant as it foreshadowed her eventual move to the city. On February 12, 2025, Bilka was placed on long-term injured reserve, ending her rookie season with Boston. Her injury kept her off the U.S. roster for the World Championships that year.

==== Seattle Torrent (2025–2026) ====
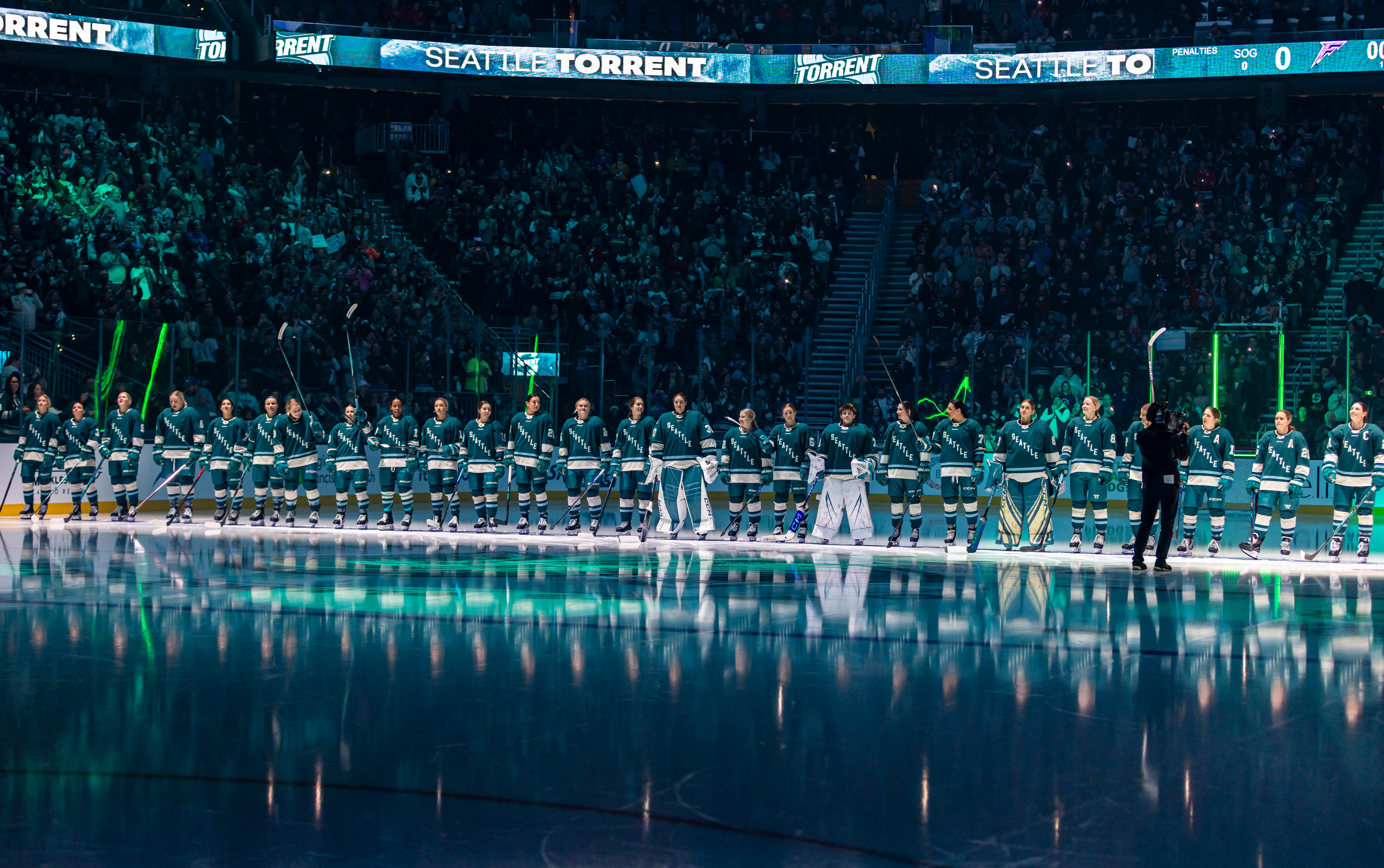
Bilka with her Seattle Torrent teammates during the record-breaking home opener at Climate Pledge Arena, November 28, 2025

On June 9, 2025, Bilka was drafted third overall by the Seattle Torrent in the 2025 PWHL Expansion Draft. The selection reunited her with former Boston Fleet captain Hilary Knight and marked a significant moment for the expansion franchise. Seattle general manager Meghan Turner, who had served as assistant general manager in Boston during Bilka's rookie season, was familiar with her playing style and potential. Bilka was among seven players selected by Seattle in the expansion draft, joining a roster that included established stars such as Knight, Alex Carpenter, and Cayla Barnes. The team's construction emphasized both veteran leadership and young talent, with Bilka positioned as a key piece of the franchise's future.

Bilka made her Seattle Torrent debut on November 21, 2025, in the team's historic first game against the Vancouver Goldeneyes at Pacific Coliseum. In the game, which Vancouver won 4–3 in overtime, she scored a goal late in the third period with just over six minutes remaining. The goal extended her scoring streak, giving her five points in her last six games dating back to the previous season. On November 28, 2025, the Torrent played their inaugural home opener at Climate Pledge Arena against the Minnesota Frost. The game drew a record-breaking crowd of 16,014 fans, setting a new attendance record for a professional women's hockey game in the United States.

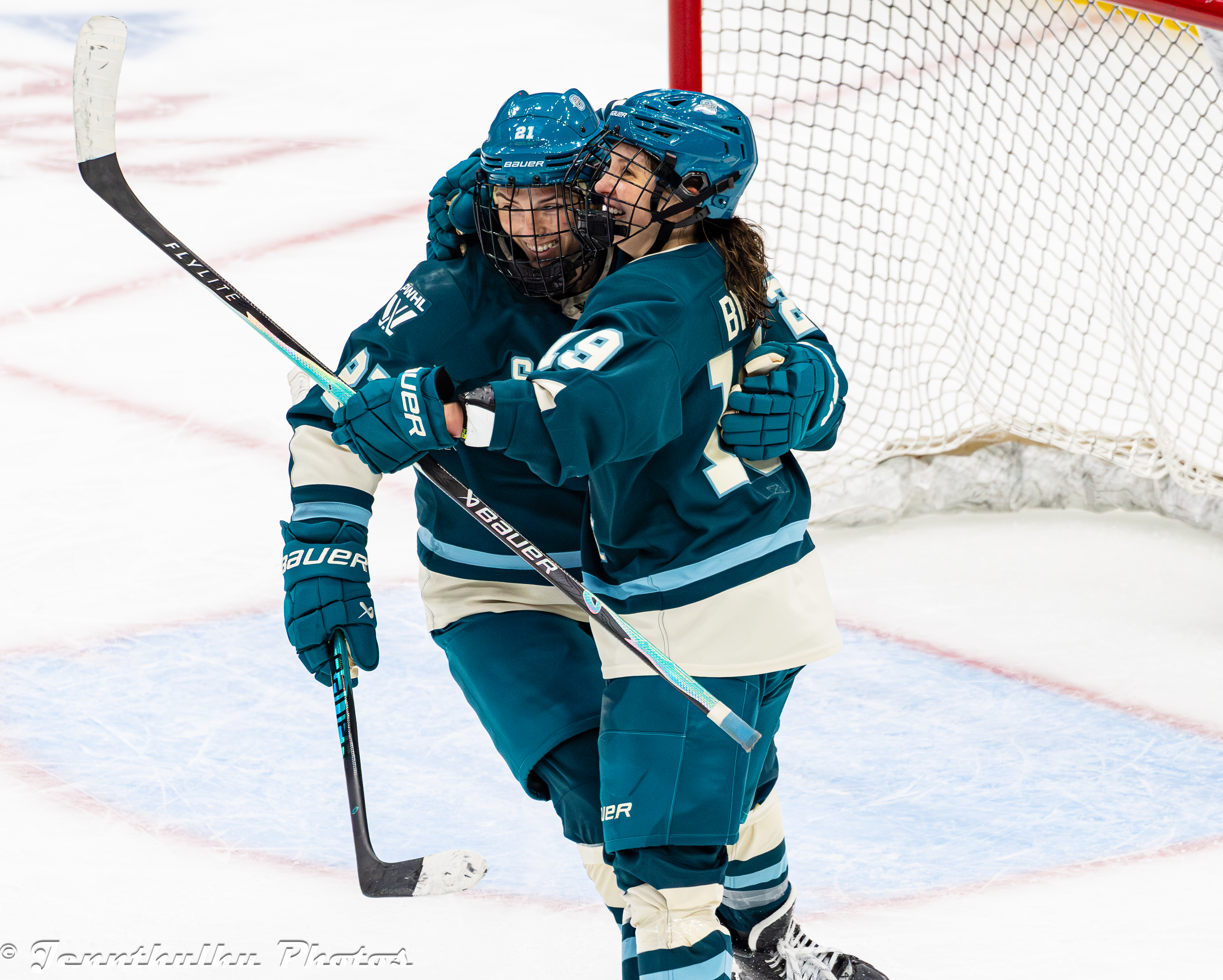
Bilka (right) celebrates with Hilary Knight during the Torrent's 4-1 win against the Ottawa Charge on December 17, 2025

Bilka recorded her first multi-point game as a Torrent player on December 3, 2025, when she assisted on both power-play goals in a 2–1 comeback victory over the New York Sirens in the last 90 seconds of the game. The assists, which came on goals by Alex Carpenter and Hilary Knight in the final 22 seconds of the third period, marked the first multi-assist performance of her professional career. The victory was Seattle's first-ever home win and marked the first Torrent goal scored at Climate Pledge Arena in franchise history. As of early December 2025, Bilka is tied for the team lead in points. Throughout the early portion of Seattle's inaugural season, Bilka has been deployed on the top line alongside Knight and Carpenter, forming what analysts have described as a potential Olympic-caliber trio. Her lightning-quick skating ability and creative offensive instincts complement the veteran stars' playmaking abilities. On December 17, 2025, Bilka recorded a new career-high three points with a goal and two assists in Seattle's 4-1 victory over the Ottawa Charge. Bilka assisted on Julia Gosling's power-play goal late in the first period and on Alex Carpenter's first goal in the second period, before scoring the first empty-net goal in Torrent franchise history with 1:30 remaining. The performance gave Bilka back-to-back multi-point games for the first time since recording assists in consecutive games for Ohio State in March 2024. Bilka was named third star of the game, with teammates Alex Carpenter and Hannah Murphy earning first and second star honors respectively. On January 20, 2026, Bilka recorded her third multi-point game of the season with a goal and an assist in Seattle's 6–4 victory over Toronto, in the highest-scoring game of the PWHL season at the time. The Torrent's six goals set a franchise record and matched the season high for any PWHL team. Bilka was named the second star of the game.

==== Detroit Clutch (2026–present) ====
During the league's expansion to 12 teams ahead of the 2026–27 season, Bilka was left unprotected by the Torrent and signed a two-year contract with the Detroit Clutch on June 5, 2026.

== International play ==
=== Junior ===
Bilka represented the United States under-18 team at the 2018 IIHF World Women's U18 Championship in Dmitrov, Russia, where she recorded one goal and two assists in five games and won a gold medal. She again represented the United States at the 2019 IIHF World Women's U18 Championship, where she recorded one goal and two assists in five games and won a silver medal.

=== Senior ===
==== World Championships ====
On August 14, 2022, Bilka was named to the roster for the United States at the 2022 IIHF Women's World Championship in Herning, Denmark. The tournament marked her first senior IIHF Women's World Championship appearance. During the tournament, she was paired on the first line with veteran Hilary Knight, fulfilling a dream for Bilka, who had met Knight as a 14-year-old at a 2014 select camp. She finished the tournament with five goals and seven assists in seven games, helping the United States win a silver medal. She ranked third overall in scoring with 12 points. Her performance established her as one of the tournament's top players despite being in her first senior international competition. Bilka was selected to represent the United States at the 2023 IIHF Women's World Championship in Brampton, Ontario. During the tournament, she recorded four goals and three assists and was one of only two American players to score in every game of the tournament, maintaining a point streak throughout. The United States defeated Canada 6–3 in the gold medal game to win the country's first gold medal since 2019 and 10th overall. Bilka played a key role in the team's success, contributing alongside fellow Ohio State signee Cayla Barnes and helping the United States reclaim the world championship.

Bilka returned to the U.S. Women's National Team for the 2024 IIHF Women's World Championship in Utica, New York, as one of 18 returning players from the gold medal-winning 2023 squad. During the tournament, she was utilized on a line with Abbey Murphy and Tessa Janecke, a combination that proved effective in the knockout stages. In the semifinal game against Finland, she scored the opening goal 12:01 into the contest, gathering a rebound off an Abbey Murphy shot to help the United States to a 5–0 victory and advance to the gold medal game. The United States lost to Canada 6–5 in overtime in the gold medal game, earning a silver medal and extending Team USA's streak to 23 consecutive medals at the Women's World Championship.

Bilka was named to the U.S. roster for the opening three games of the 2024–25 Rivalry Series in November 2024, as one of 24 returning players from the 2024 World Championship team. In the opening game on November 6, 2024, in San Jose, California, she scored on a power play in the second period, capping off a series of six passes with assists from Alex Carpenter and Laila Edwards, as the United States defeated Canada 7–2. The victory marked Team USA's largest margin of victory in Rivalry Series history. She was also selected for the February 2025 leg of the Rivalry Series, joining 17 returning players from the November roster. In Game 4 on February 6, 2025, in Halifax, Nova Scotia, she scored in the shootout to help the United States defeat Canada 2–1 and even the series at 2–2. However, Bilka was injured during the series and missed time in the final games.

Bilka returned to the U.S. roster for the final two games of the 2025 Rivalry Series on December 10 and 13 in Edmonton, Alberta. She was deployed on a line with Taylor Heise at center and Abbey Murphy on the right wing throughout the series. In the November 8 game in Buffalo, New York, she assisted on Hilary Knight's second power-play goal of the game. The United States swept all four games of the series, outscoring Canada 24–7, with victories of 4–1, 6–1, 10–4, and 4–1. Following the series, Bilka was identified by analysts as a likely member of the U.S. Olympic roster for the 2026 Winter Olympics, with her line alongside Heise and Murphy described as one of the team's locked-in top-six forward combinations heading into the Games.

==== Olympics ====
On January 2, 2026, Bilka was named to team USA's roster to compete at the 2026 Winter Olympics. During the team's last preliminary round game against Canada on February 10, Bilka scored two goals to lift the U.S. to a 5–0 win. This marked the first time that Canada had been shutout in women's ice hockey at the Olympic Games. During the team's quarterfinal game against Italy, she scored the sixth goal solidifying the U.S.' 6–0 win as the team advanced undefeated to the semifinals. She finished the tournament with four goals and three assists in seven games and won a gold medal. Her four goals tied Thea Johansson for the tournament lead. She was subsequently named to the media all-star team.

== Career statistics ==
=== Regular season and playoffs ===
			Regular season					Playoffs
Season	Team	League	GP	G	A	Pts	PIM	GP	G	A	Pts	PIM
2019–20	Boston College	HE	34	14	23	37	12	—	—	—	—	—
2020–21	Boston College	HE	19	7	9	16	2	—	—	—	—	—
2021–22	Boston College	HE	34	16	17	33	26	—	—	—	—	—
2022–23	Boston College	HE	34	12	29	41	14	—	—	—	—	—
2023–24	Ohio State University	WCHA	39	22	26	48	22	—	—	—	—	—
2024–25	Boston Fleet	PWHL	16	5	6	11	6	—	—	—	—	—
2025–26	Seattle Torrent	PWHL	14	4	5	9	4	—	—	—	—	—
PWHL totals			30	9	11	20	10	—	—	—	—	—

=== International ===
Year	Team	Event	Result	GP	G	A	Pts	PIM
2018	United States	U18	1st place, gold medalist(s)	5	1	2	3	0
2019	United States	U18	2nd place, silver medalist(s)	5	1	2	3	0
2022	United States	WC	2nd place, silver medalist(s)	7	5	7	12	4
2023	United States	WC	1st place, gold medalist(s)	7	4	3	7	2
2024	United States	WC	2nd place, silver medalist(s)	7	1	3	4	4
2026	United States	OG	1st place, gold medalist(s)	7	4	3	7	0
Junior totals				10	2	6	8	0
Senior totals				28	14	16	30	10

== Awards and honors ==
Honors	Year
College
National Rookie of the Year	2020
Hockey East Rookie of the Year	2020
USCHO.com All-Rookie Team	2020
Hockey East All-Rookie Team	2020
Hockey East Second Team	2020
Hockey East Third Team	2021
Hockey East First Team	2022
New England Hockey Writers Association All-Star	2022
Hockey East Second Team	2023
International
Winter Olympics Media All-Star Team	2026

== Other work ==
Bilka has remained committed to growing girls' hockey in Texas, returning in the summers to work with youth programs and camps. She has expressed pride in the development of girls' hockey organizations in the Dallas area, noting the significant growth since her youth, which now allows young girls to stay home rather than relocating to pursue elite hockey opportunities.
