= Alexis Petford =

Canadian ice hockey player

- Born: February 12, 2004 (age 22) Balgonie, Saskatchewan
- Height: 5 ft 5 in (165 cm)
- Position: Forward
- PWHL team: Vegas Vanguards
- Played for: Colgate Raiders; Stonehill Skyhawks

Alexis Petford (born February 12, 2004) is a Canadian ice hockey player. She played for the Stonehill Skyhawks from 2022 to 2024, when she transferred to the Colgate Raiders. In the 2026 PWHL Draft, she was drafted by the Vegas Vanguards.

== Playing career ==
Petford played for the Regina U18 AA Rebels for four years, earning 76 points in 29 games in the 2021–2022 season. In 2021, she was invited to the U18 Team Canada selection camp.

At Stonehill College, Petford led the Skyhawks in goals, assists, and points as a freshman, and was ranked second in the nation for goals in the 2022–2023 season. In the same season, she scored the program's first ever hat-trick, earned NEWHA Player of the Week three times and NEWHA Rookie of the Week twice, and was named the NEWHA Rookie of the Year. She was named to the All-NEWHA First team in her freshman and sophomore years, was named to the All-USCHO Rookie team, and was the only NEWHA player to be named to the All-USCHO Third team in the 2023–2024 season.

In 2024, Petford transferred to Colgate University, where she scored 29 goals, 27 assists, and 59 points in her two years there.

In the 2026 PWHL Draft, she was selected in the fifth round, 53rd overall, by the Vegas Vanguards.
