= Riley Brengman =

American ice hockey player (born 2002)

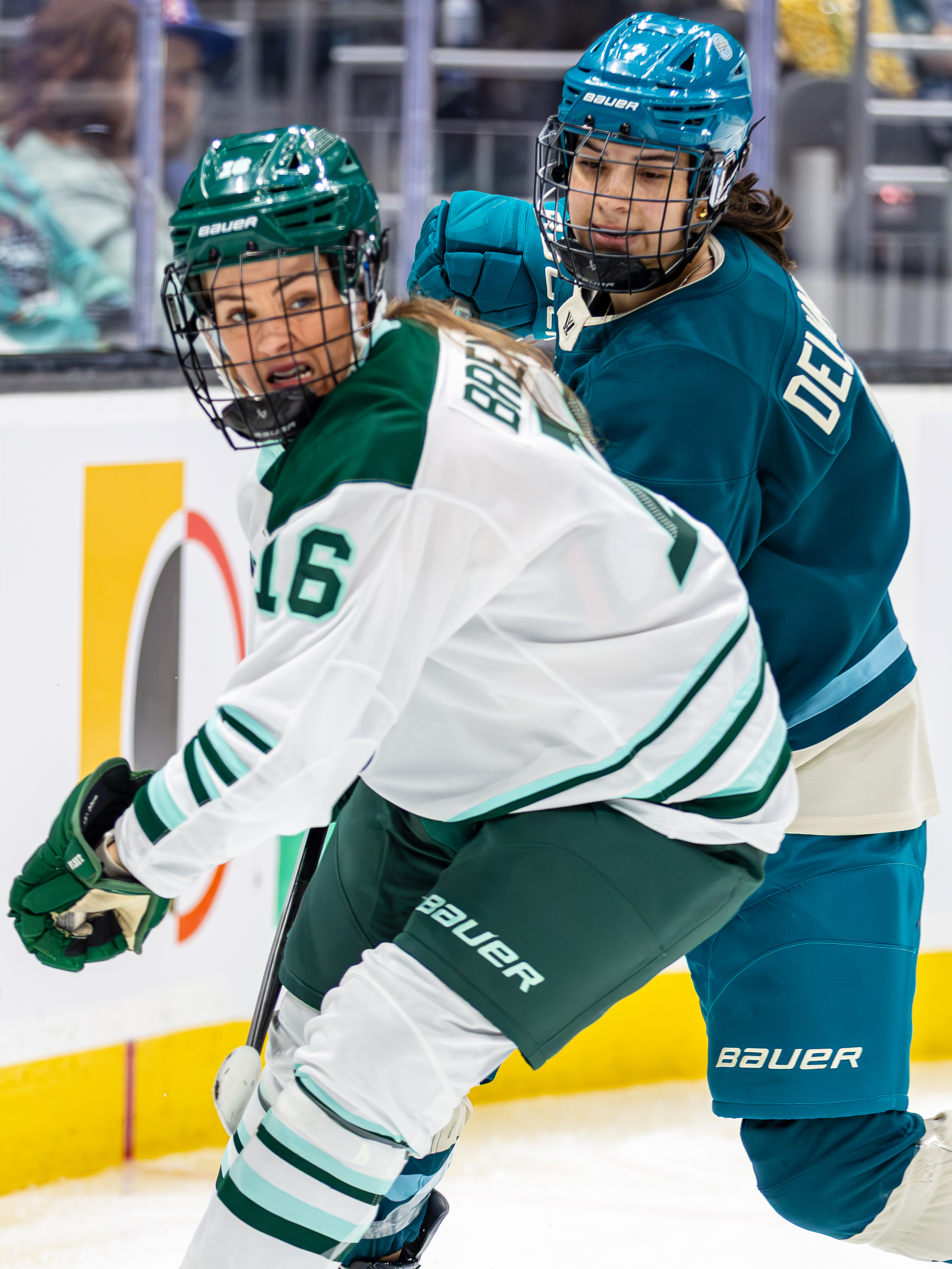
- Brengman (left) with the Boston Fleet in 2026
- Born: July 6, 2002 (age 24) China Township, Michigan, U.S.
- Height: 5 ft 5 in (165 cm)
- Position: Defender
- Shoots: Right
- PWHL team Former teams: Hamilton Havoc; Boston Fleet
- Playing career: 2025–present

Riley Brengman (born July 6, 2002) is an American professional ice hockey player who is a defender for the Hamilton Havoc of the Professional Women's Hockey League (PWHL). She previously played for the Boston Fleet of the PWHL. She played college ice hockey for the Ohio State Buckeyes from 2020 to 2025 and is a two-time national champion (2022, 2024).

== Early life ==
Brengman grew up in China Township, Michigan, and began skating at age four before joining organized hockey at age six. Brengman played youth hockey for Belle Tire, serving as a captain and winning multiple state titles.

== Playing career ==
=== College ===
Brengman debuted for Ohio State in 2020–21 and was named to the WCHA All-Rookie Team. She helped the Buckeyes to national championships in 2022 and 2024. As a graduate student in 2024–25 she set career highs with 19 points (4 goals, 15 assists) in 40 games and earned WCHA Defender of the Week on November 18, 2024.

=== Professional ===
On June 24, 2025, Brengman was drafted in the fourth round, 26th overall, by the Boston Fleet in the 2025 PWHL Draft. On November 20, 2025, she signed a one-year contract with the Fleet. During the 2025–26 season, she recorded two goals and one assist in 28 regular season games.

During the league's expansion to 12 teams ahead of the 2026–27 season, she signed a two-year contract with the Hamilton Havoc on June 14, 2026.

== International play ==
Brengman skated for the United States in the 2022 Rivalry Series against Canada, appearing in three games and recording one assist. In 2023 she was named to the U.S. Collegiate Women’s Select Team for the Collegiate Series versus Canada.

== Personal life ==
Brengman is the daughter of Heather and Ken Brengman and has three siblings: Liam, Evan, and Reagan. According to her USA Hockey profile, Brengman's favorite postgame meal is Chicken, brown rice and veggies.

== Career statistics ==
=== Regular season and playoffs ===
			Regular season					Playoffs
Season	Team	League	GP	G	A	Pts	PIM	GP	G	A	Pts	PIM
2020–21	Ohio State	WCHA	20	2	9	11	6	—	—	—	—	—
2021–22	Ohio State	WCHA	34	4	7	11	10	—	—	—	—	—
2022–23	Ohio State	WCHA	38	3	5	8	12	—	—	—	—	—
2023–24	Ohio State	WCHA	39	1	12	13	14	—	—	—	—	—
2024–25	Ohio State	WCHA	40	4	15	19	27	—	—	—	—	—
2025–26	Boston Fleet	PWHL	28	2	1	3	14	4	0	0	0	2
PWHL totals			28	2	1	3	14	4	0	0	0	2

== Awards and honours ==
Honour	Year
College
WCHA All-Rookie Team	2021
NCAA national champion	2022, 2024
