= Raygan Kirk =

Canadian ice hockey player (born 2001)

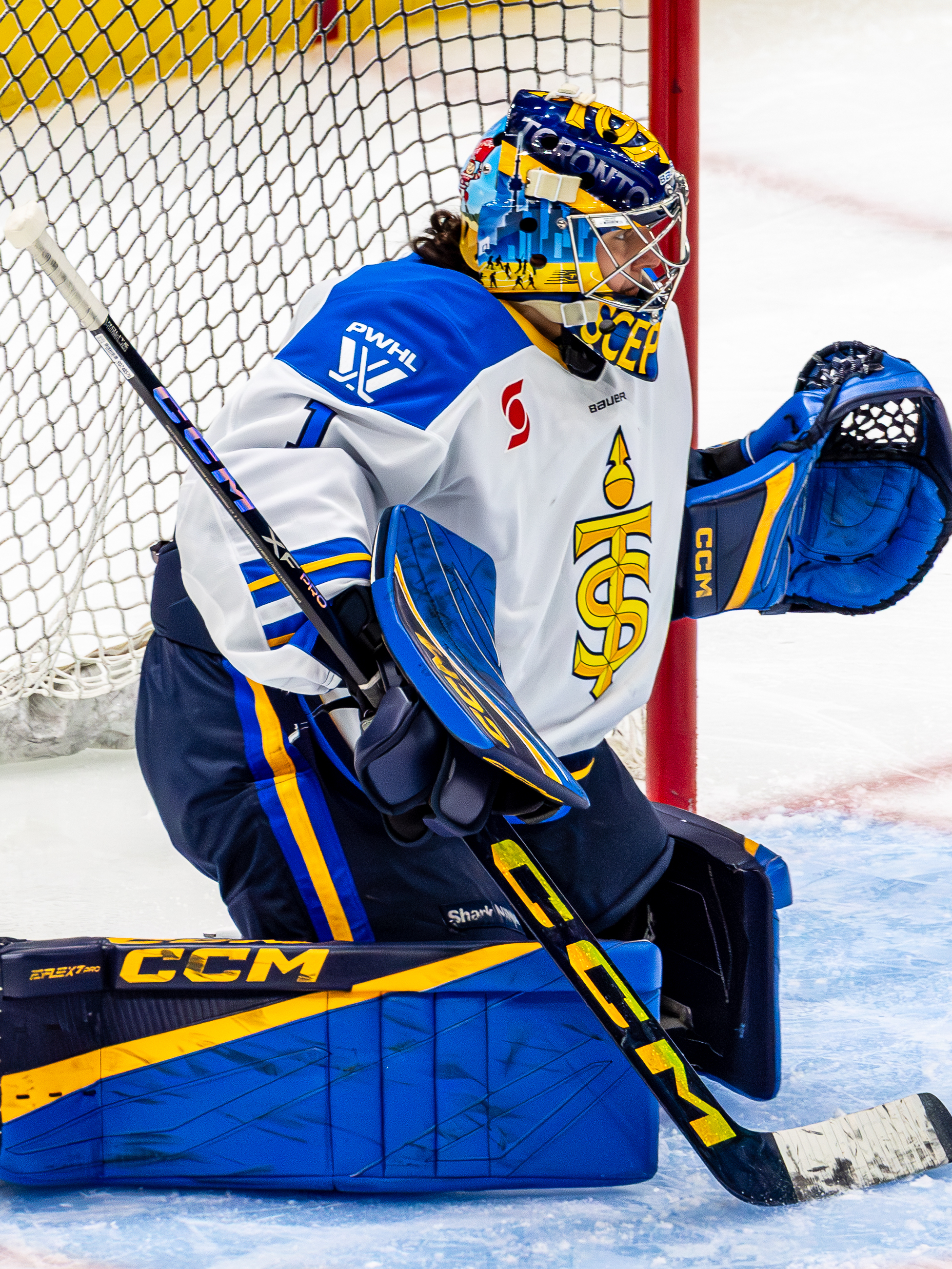
- Kirk with the Toronto Sceptres in 2026
- Born: March 11, 2001 (age 25) Ste. Anne, Manitoba, Canada
- Height: 5 ft 8 in (173 cm)
- Position: Goaltender
- Catches: Left
- PWHL team: Toronto Sceptres

Raygan Kirk (born March 11, 2001) is a Canadian ice hockey player who is a goaltender for the Toronto Sceptres of the Professional Women's Hockey League (PWHL). She played college ice hockey at Robert Morris and Ohio State. She was named Most Outstanding Player at the 2024 NCAA Division I women's ice hockey tournament.

== Early life ==
Kirk is the daughter of Brad and Nancy Kirk. She attended Collège Lorette Collegiate in Lorette, Manitoba. She was named the Manitoba Chicken Junior Female Athlete of the Year in 2019.

== Playing career ==
=== College ===
Kirk began her collegiate career for Robert Morris during the 2019–20 season. During her freshman year, she appeared in 26 games, with 24 starts, and posted a 15–8–1 record, with a 2.09 goals against average (GAA) and .924 save percentage. She also recorded four shutouts, which tied for most in the conference. Following the season she was named to the CHA All-Rookie team. During the 2020–21 season, in her sophomore year, she posted a 8–5–1 record, with a 1.91 GAA and .939 save percentage, in a season that was shortened due to the COVID-19 pandemic.

On May 26, 2021, Robert Morris University announced they were disbanding both men's and women's ice hockey programs. In June 2021, Kirk transferred to Ohio State. During the 2021–22 season, in her junior year, she appeared in four games and posted a 4–0–0 record, with a 1.37 GAA and .881 save percentage. She served as a backup to starting goaltender Andrea Brändli. She helped lead the Buckeyes to their first NCAA women's ice hockey tournament championship in 2022.

During the 2022–23 season, in her senior year, she appeared in eleven games and posted an 8–2–1 record, with a 2.03 GAA and .912 save percentage. During the 2023–24 season, in her graduate year, she appeared in 24 games and posted a 22–2–0 record, with a 1.05 GAA, a .945 save percentage, and ten shutouts. Following an outstanding season, she was named a finalist for the Goalie of the Year award. She helped lead the Buckeyes to their second NCAA women's ice hockey tournament championship in 2024. During the championship game against Wisconsin she posted a 27 save shutout and was subsequently named tournament Most Outstanding Player.

=== Professional ===
On June 10, 2024, Kirk was drafted in the seventh round, 42nd overall, by the Toronto Sceptres in the 2024 PWHL draft. On June 25, 2024, she signed a two-year contract with Toronto.

== International play ==
Medal record

Representing Canada

Women's ice hockey

World U18 Championships
Gold medal – first place	2019 Japan	

Kirk represented Canada at the 2019 IIHF World Women's U18 Championship and won a gold medal. During the gold medal game against the United States she recorded 25 saves in the win and was subsequently named tournament MVP.

== Career statistics ==
Season	Team	League	GP	W	L	T	MIN	GA	SO	GAA	SV%
2019–20	Robert Morris University	CHA	26	14	7	1	1,463	51	4	2.09	.924
2020–21	Robert Morris University	CHA	16	8	5	1	879	28	3	1.91	.939
2021–22	Ohio State University	WCHA	4	4	0	0	219	5	0	1.37	.881
2022–23	Ohio State University	WCHA	11	8	2	1	648	22	2	2.03	.912
2023–24	Ohio State University	WCHA	24	22	2	0	1,422	25	10	1.05	.945
2024–25	Toronto Sceptres	PWHL	10	5	1	2	530	20	0	2.26	.917
NCAA totals			81	55	17	3	4,631	131	19	1.72	.929
