= Olivia Mobley =

American ice hockey player (born 2001)

- Born: October 28, 2001 (age 24) St. Louis Park, Minnesota, U.S.
- Height: 5 ft 9 in (175 cm)
- Position: Forward
- Shoots: Right
- PWHL team: Boston Fleet
- National team: United States
- Playing career: 2025–present

Olivia Mobley (born October 28, 2001) is an American professional ice hockey forward for the Boston Fleet of the Professional Women's Hockey League (PWHL). She played college ice hockey for the Quinnipiac Bobcats, the Ohio State Buckeyes, and the Minnesota Duluth Bulldogs.

== Early life ==
Mobley grew up in St. Louis Park, Minnesota, and starred for Breck School, winning three Minnesota Class A state titles.

== Playing career ==
=== College ===
Mobley began her collegiate career at Quinnipiac in 2020–21, earning a spot on the ECAC Hockey All-Rookie Team and being named ECAC Rookie of the Month for February 2021. She led Quinnipiac in points in both 2021–22 and 2022–23 and was named to the ECAC Second Team in 2022–23.

For 2023–24, Mobley transferred to Ohio State, recording 27 points (9 goals, 18 assists) during the Buckeyes’ national-championship season.

Mobley played her graduate season in 2024–25 at Minnesota Duluth, where she scored 19 goals and 27 points and earned All-WCHA Third Team honours. She also led the NCAA with four shorthanded goals, tying a UMD program mark in NCAA-sanctioned play.

=== Professional ===
On June 24, 2025, Mobley was drafted in the third round, 18th overall, by the Boston Fleet. On November 20, 2025, she signed a one-year contract with the Fleet..

She made her PWHL debut on November 29, 2025 in a 3-1 win against the Toronto Sceptres. Zanon scored her first PWHL goal in her second game, a 3-1 victory, against Nicole Hensley of the Minnesota Frost on December 19, and finished the game as the third star.

== International play ==
Mobley has represented the United States at the Collegiate Select level, appearing on the 2023 U.S. roster for the Collegiate Series versus Canada.

== Personal life ==
Mobley is the daughter of Jenn and Scott Mobley and has two brothers, Luke and Jack.

== Career statistics ==
=== Regular season and playoffs ===
			Regular season					Playoffs
Season	Team	League	GP	G	A	Pts	PIM	GP	G	A	Pts	PIM
2020–21	Quinnipiac	ECAC	8	1	4	5	0	—	—	—	—	—
2021–22	Quinnipiac	ECAC	39	17	17	34	16	—	—	—	—	—
2022–23	Quinnipiac	ECAC	40	15	28	43	24	—	—	—	—	—
2023–24	Ohio State	WCHA	39	9	18	27	12	—	—	—	—	—
2024–25	Minnesota Duluth	WCHA	39	19	8	27	29	—	—	—	—	—
2025–26	Boston Fleet	PWHL	10	3	2	5	4	4	—	—	—	2
College Totals			165	61	74	136	81	—	—	—	—	—	—
PWHL Totals			10	3	2	5	4	4	—	—	—	2

Sources: College Hockey Inc.; Professional Women's Hockey League.

== Awards and honours ==
Honour	Year
College
ECAC Hockey All-Rookie Team	2021
Second Team All-ECAC Hockey	2023
All-WCHA Third Team	2025
