= Allyson Simpson =

American ice hockey player (born 2000)

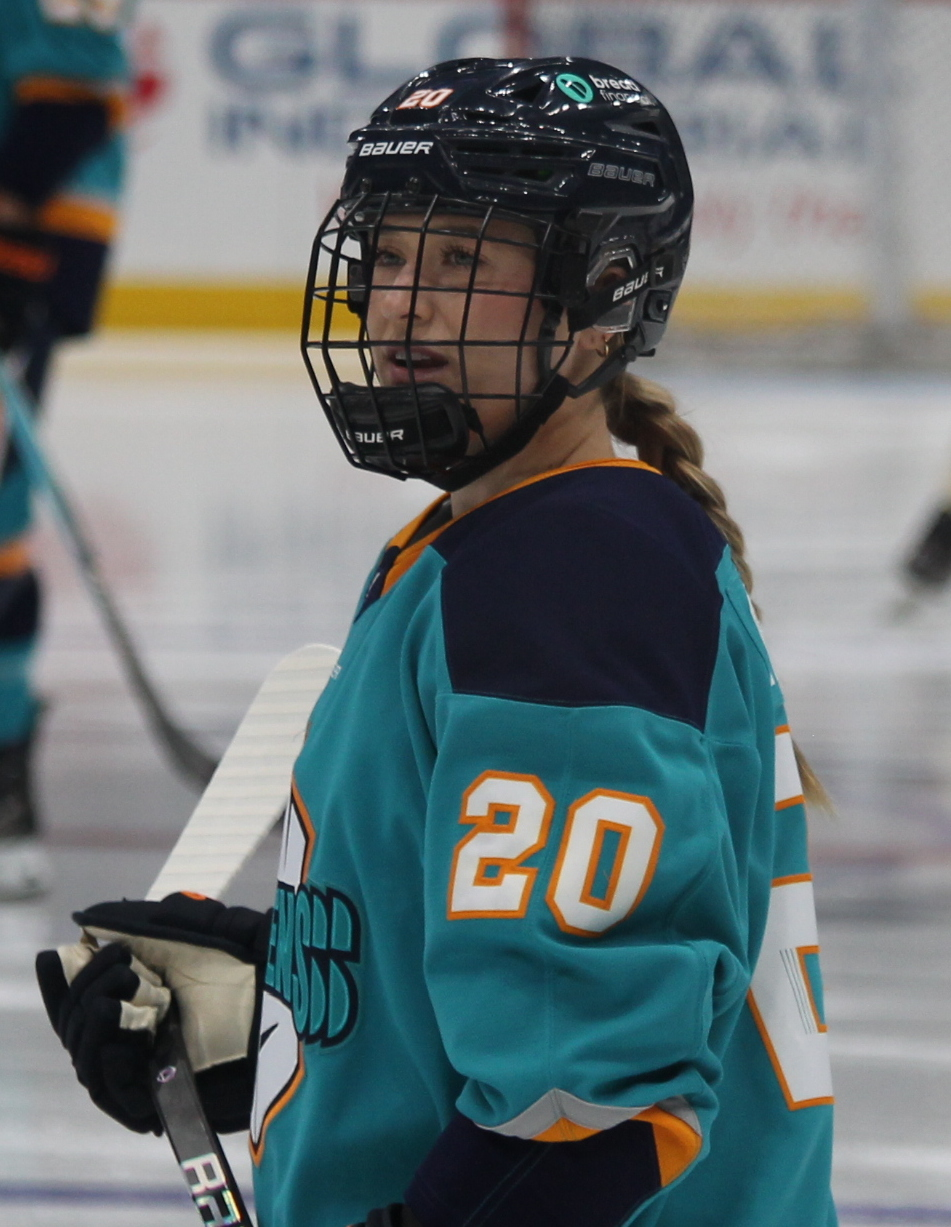
- Simpson with the New York Sirens in 2026
- Born: December 20, 2000 (age 25) Fort Worth, Texas, U.S.
- Height: 5 ft 8 in (173 cm)
- Weight: 165 lb (75 kg; 11 st 11 lb)
- Position: Defense
- Shoots: Right
- PWHL team Former teams: Hamilton Havoc; New York Sirens
- National team: United States
- Playing career: 2024–present
Medal record
World U18 Championship
Gold medal – first place	2017 Czech Republic
Gold medal – first place	2018 Russia

Allyson Simpson (born December 20, 2000) is an American professional ice hockey player who is a defender for the Hamilton Havoc of the Professional Women's Hockey League (PWHL). She previously played for the New York Sirens of the PWHL. She played college ice hockey at Colgate.

== Early life ==
Simpson was born to James and Amy Simpson in Fort Worth, Texas and raised in Frisco, Texas. She moved to Minnesota at 13 years old and attended Shattuck-Saint Mary's in Faribault, Minnesota, where she played ice hockey for five seasons. She also played ultimate frisbee, golf and lacrosse. As a senior in 2019, she recorded eight goals and 29 assists in 43 games. She helped the Sabres win a national championship in 2015, 2016, and 2018.

== Playing career ==
=== College ===
Simpson began her collegiate career for Colgate during the 2019–20 season, where she recorded seven goals and five assists in 38 games. During the 2020–21 season, in her sophomore year, she recorded one goal and seven assists in 23 games. During the 2021–22 season, in her junior year, she recorded eight goals and 12 assists in 33 games. During the 2022–23 season, in her senior year, she recorded five goals and 27 assists in 40 games. She recorded seven assists and ten blocked shots in seven games to begin the season, and was subsequently named ECAC Hockey Defender of the Week for consecutive weeks in October 2022. Following the season she was named to the All-ECAC Hockey third team. During the 2023–24 season, in her fifth year, she recorded nine goals and 25 assists in 40 games. She finished her collegiate career with 30 goals and 77 assists in 174 games.

=== Professional ===
On June 10, 2024, Simpson was drafted in the third round, 16th overall, by PWHL New York in the 2024 PWHL Draft. Following pre-season mini camp, she signed a one-year contract with the New York Sirens. During the 2024–25 season, she recorded one goal and four assists in 30 games. On July 9, 2025, she signed a two-year contract extension with the Sirens. During the 2025–26 season, she recorded three goals and two assists in 30 games.

During the league's expansion to 12 teams ahead of the 2026–27 season, she signed a two-year contract with the Hamilton Havoc on June 14, 2026.

== International play ==
Simpson represented the United States at the 2017 IIHF World Women's U18 Championship where she was scoreless in five games and won a gold medal. She again competed at the 2018 IIHF World Women's U18 Championship where she recorded one goal and one assist in five games and won a gold medal.

== Career statistics ==
=== Regular season and playoffs ===
			Regular season					Playoffs
Season	Team	League	GP	G	A	Pts	PIM	GP	G	A	Pts	PIM
2019–20	Colgate University	ECAC	38	7	5	12	28	—	—	—	—	—
2020–21	Colgate University	ECAC	23	1	8	9	16	—	—	—	—	—
2021–22	Colgate University	ECAC	33	8	12	20	24	—	—	—	—	—
2022–23	Colgate University	ECAC	40	5	27	32	27	—	—	—	—	—
2023–24	Colgate University	ECAC	40	9	25	34	32	—	—	—	—	—
2024–25	New York Sirens	PWHL	30	1	4	5	12	—	—	—	—	—
2025–26	New York Sirens	PWHL	30	3	2	5	16	—	—	—	—	—
PWHL totals			60	4	6	10	28	—	—	—	—	—

=== International ===
Year	Team	Event	Result	GP	G	A	Pts	PIM
2017	United States	U18	1st place, gold medalist(s)	5	0	0	0	6
2018	United States	U18	1st place, gold medalist(s)	5	1	1	2	0
Junior totals				10	1	1	2	6
