= Kirsten Simms =

American ice hockey player (born 2004)

- Simms playing for the Wisconsin Badgers in 2025
- Born: August 31, 2004 (age 22) Plymouth, Michigan, United States
- Height: 5 ft 6 in (168 cm)
- Position: Forward
- Shoots: Right
- PWHL team: Toronto Sceptres
- National team: United States
- Playing career: 2022–present
Medal record
Olympic Games
Gold medal – first place	2026 Milano Cortina	Team
World Championships
Gold medal – first place	2025 Czechia
Gold medal – first place	2026 Denmark
Silver medal – second place	2024 United States
World U18 Championships
Gold medal – first place	2020 Slovakia
Silver medal – second place	2022 United States

Kirsten Simms (born August 31, 2004) is an American ice hockey player who is a forward for the Toronto Sceptres of the Professional Women’s Hockey League (PWHL). She previously played at the University of Wisconsin of the National Collegiate Athletic Association (NCAA) and is a member of the United States women's national ice hockey team. She was named Most Outstanding Player at the 2025 NCAA tournament after scoring two dramatic goals—a game-tying penalty shot with 18 seconds remaining in regulation and the overtime winner—to lead Wisconsin to their eighth national championship.

At Wisconsin, Simms was a three-time NCAA national champion (2023, 2025, 2026) and has established herself as one of the most prolific scorers in the nation. In her sophomore season (2023–24), she led the NCAA in scoring with 75 points in 39 games, posting a 1.97 points-per-game average that ranked in the top-10 in program history. She was named WCHA Player of the Year and Forward of the Year, earned First-Team All-American honors, and was a Top-3 finalist for the Patty Kazmaier Award. Through three collegiate seasons, Simms has recorded 139 points in 117 games, averaging 1.19 points per game. She scored game-winning goals in Wisconsin's NCAA championship victories in 2023 and 2025.

Internationally, Simms has represented the United States at two IIHF World Women's U18 Championships, winning gold in 2020 and silver in 2022 as alternate captain. She made her senior-level international debut at the 2024 World Championship, where she scored a dramatic overtime winner against Canada in her first senior-level goal and finished with four points in seven games as Team USA won silver. Simms added a gold medal at the 2025 World Championship.

== Playing career ==
=== College ===
Simms began her collegiate career for the University of Wisconsin during the 2022–23 season. During her freshman year, she led all freshman in goals with 16 goals and 16 assists in 41 games. She was named the WCHA Rookie of the Month for the month of December 2022, after she recorded seven points in five games during the month. She scored the game-winning goal against Ohio State during the National Championship game at the 2023 NCAA Division I women's ice hockey tournament, helping Wisconsin win their seventh National Championship. She was subsequently named to the NCAA All-Tournament Team. Following the season she was named to the USCHO All-Rookie Team and WCHA All-Rookie Team.

During the 2023–24 season, in her sophomore year, she led the nation in scoring with 36 goals and 39 assists in 36 games for 71 points. Her 1.97 points per game led the NCAA, and ranked top-ten in program history. She led Wisconsin with nine game-winning goals, which ranked second in the NCAA. Following an outstanding season, she was named to the All-WCHA first team, and named WCHA Forward of the Year and Player of the Year. She was also named a top-three finalist for the Patty Kazmaier Award.

During the 2024–25 season, in her junior year, she recorded 25 goals and 47 assists in 41 games. During the championship game of the 2025 NCAA Division I women's ice hockey tournament, against Ohio State, she scored the game-tying goal on a penalty shot with 18 seconds left in the game to force overtime. She then scored the game-winning goal, helping Wisconsin win their eighth national championship. She was subsequently named tournament Most Outstanding Player and named to the NCAA All-Tournament team.

=== Professional ===
On June 17, 2026, Simms was drafted eighth overall by the Toronto Sceptres in the 2026 PHWL draft.

== International play ==
=== Junior ===
Simms represented the United States at the 2020 IIHF World Women's U18 Championship, where she recorded two assists in five games as Team USA won a gold medal. She returned to the U-18 World Championship at the 2022 tournament, held at LaBahn Arena in Madison, Wisconsin. She served as alternate captain and recorded five assists in five games, helping the United States win a silver medal.

=== Senior ===
Simms made her senior-level international debut at the 2024 World Championship in Utica, New York, at age 19 as one of four college newcomers to Team USA's roster. She was placed on an "all-rookie line" alongside Wisconsin teammate Laila Edwards and Ohio State's Joy Dunne. In the final game of the preliminary round on April 8, 2024, Simms scored her first senior-level international goal—a dramatic overtime winner against Canada to give the United States a 1–0 victory and clinch the Group A title. Simms scored 3:38 into the three-on-three overtime period, converting a three-on-one break after Canada's Brianne Jenner fell in the U.S. zone. Caroline Harvey led the rush up the left wing and centered the puck to Simms, who fired a shot that beat Canadian goaltender Ann-Renée Desbiens five-hole despite having her stick pulled from behind. The Americans outshot Canada 7–0 in the overtime period in front of a sellout crowd at the Adirondack Bank Center. "Obviously, a super surreal moment," Simms said after the game. "It still doesn't feel like it happened." The victory marked revenge for the Americans, who had lost four straight games to Canada in the Rivalry Series earlier that winter. Simms finished the 2024 World Championship with two goals and two assists for four points in seven games as the United States won a silver medal.

Simms returned to the World Championship at the 2025 tournament in České Budějovice, Czech Republic, where she recorded two assists in four games as the United States won a gold medal. The Americans defeated Canada 4–3 in overtime in the gold medal game, with Tessa Janecke scoring the game-winning goal.

On December 11, 2025, Simms scored a goal in a 10–4 United States victory over Canada in Edmonton, Alberta, in the third game of the 2025 Rivalry Series. The game marked the first time the Canadian women's national ice hockey team had allowed 10 goals in a loss to the United States.

On January 2, 2026, she was named to team USA's roster to compete at the 2026 Winter Olympics. On February 10, Simms scored a goal in a 5-0 win versus Canada, marking the first time that Canada have been shutout in women's ice hockey at the Olympic Games.

== Career statistics ==
=== Regular season and playoffs ===
			Regular season					Playoffs
Season	Team	League	GP	G	A	Pts	PIM	GP	G	A	Pts	PIM
2022–23	University of Wisconsin	WCHA	41	16	16	32	25	—	—	—	—	—
2023–24	University of Wisconsin	WCHA	39	33	42	75	24	—	—	—	—	—
2024–25	University of Wisconsin	WCHA	41	25	47	72	18	—	—	—	—	—
2025–26	University of Wisconsin	WCHA	31	26	33	59	18	—	—	—	—	—
NCAA totals			152	100	138	238	85	—	—	—	—	—

=== International ===
Year	Team	Event	Result	GP	G	A	Pts	PIM
2020	United States	U18	1st place, gold medalist(s)	5	0	2	2	4
2022	United States	U18	2nd place, silver medalist(s)	5	0	5	5	2
2024	United States	WC	2nd place, silver medalist(s)	7	2	2	4	27
2025	United States	WC	1st place, gold medalist(s)	7	2	2	4	27
2026	United States	OG	1st place, gold medalist(s)	7	1	0	1	6
Junior totals				10	0	7	7	6
Senior totals				14	3	2	5	33

== Awards and honors ==
Honors	Year
College
USCHO All-Rookie Team	2023
NCAA All-Tournament Team	2023
WCHA All-Rookie Team	2023
All-WCHA First Team	2024
WCHA Player of the Year	2024
WCHA Forward of the Year	2024
CCM/AHCA First Team All-American	2024
NCAA All-Tournament Team	2024
All-WCHA First Team	2025
NCAA All-Tournament Team	2025
All-WCHA Second Team	2026
NCAA All-Tournament Team	2026
