= Hadley Hartmetz =

American ice hockey player (born 2008)

- Born: March 25, 2001 (age 25) Phoenixville, Pennsylvania, U.S.
- Height: 5 ft 5 in (165 cm)
- Weight: 140 lb (64 kg; 10 st 0 lb)
- Position: Defense
- Shoots: Right
- PWHL team Former teams: San Jose Sea Lions; Boston Fleet
- Playing career: 2024–present

Hadley Hartmetz (born March 25, 2001) is an American professional ice hockey defenseman for the San Jose Sea Lions of the Professional Women's Hockey League (PWHL). She previously played for the Boston Fleet of the PWHL. She played college ice hockey with Boston College before transferring to Ohio State where she won the NCAA Championship in 2022 and 2024.

== Playing career ==
=== College ===
After attending Shattuck-Saint Mary's, Hartmetz began her college hockey career with Boston College before transferring to Ohio State. She won the NCAA National Championship with Ohio twice in 2022 and 2024.

=== Professional ===
Hartmetz was drafted by the Boston Fleet in the seventh round, 40th overall, in the 2024 PWHL Draft. She signed a one-year contract with the team during training camp but was unable to play at the start of the season due to a lower body injury. With the Fleet, teammate Amanda Pelkey is her former US U-18 national team coach. After appearing in two games during the 2024–25 season, she signed another one-year contract with the Fleet on June 27, 2025. During the 2025–26 season, she recorded seven assists in 27 regular season games.

During the league's expansion to 12 teams ahead of the 2026–27 season, she was left unprotected by the Fleet and signed a two-year contract with the San Jose Sea Lions on June 10, 2026.

== International career ==
Hartmetz played for the U.S. U18 National Team. She won silver in 2018 and gold in 2019 in the IIHF Women's World Championship. She was also a member of the U.S. U-18 Women's Select Team at the 2017 and 2018 U-18 Series vs Canada and has been invited to other U.S. Women's National Team camps.

== Career statistics ==
			Regular season					Playoffs
Season	Team	League	GP	G	A	Pts	PIM	GP	G	A	Pts	PIM
2019–20	Boston College	ECAC	33	2	13	15	8	—	—	—	—	—
2020–21	Boston College	ECAC	19	1	13	14	8	—	—	—	—	—
2021–22	Ohio State	WCHA	38	3	10	13	6	—	—	—	—	—
2022–23	Ohio State	WCHA	41	6	7	13	0	—	—	—	—	—
2023–24	Ohio State	WCHA	39	9	24	33	8	—	—	—	—	—
2024–25	Boston Fleet	PWHL	2	0	0	0	0	—	—	—	—	—
2025–26	Boston Fleet	PWHL	27	0	7	7	8	4	0	0	0	0
PWHL totals			29	0	7	7	8	4	0	0	0	0
