= 2022–23 Wisconsin Badgers women's ice hockey season =

National Champions Frozen Four, W, 1–0 vs. Ohio State
- Conference: 3rd WCHA
- Home ice: LaBahn Arena

Rankings
- USA Today: #4
- USCHO.com: #3

Record
- Overall: 29–10–2
- Conference: 19–7–2
- Home: 13–4–1
- Road: 13–5–1
- Neutral: 3–1–0

Coaches and captains
- Head coach: Mark Johnson (20th season)
- Assistant coaches: Dan Koch; Jackie Crum; Mark Greenhalgh
- Captain: Britta Curl
- Alternate captain(s): Natalie Buchbinder; Nicole LaMantia; Casey O'Brien

The 2022–23 Wisconsin Badgers women's ice hockey season represented the University of Wisconsin–Madison during the 2022–23 NCAA Division I women's ice hockey season. Wisconsin won the NCAA women's ice hockey tournament, their seventh national championship.

== Offseason ==
=== Recruiting ===
| Player | Position | Nationality | Notes |
|---|---|---|---|
| Chloe Baker | Goalie | United States | Played for the Chicago Mission |
| Jesse Compher | Forward | United States | Grad transfer from Boston University |
| Laila Edwards | Forward | United States | Played for the USA-U18 team |
| Claire Enright | Forward | United States | Played for the USA-U18 team |
| Caroline Harvey | Defense | United States | Won a silver medal at the 2022 Winter Olympics |
| Vivian Jungels | Defense | United States | Played for Edina High School |
| Kirsten Simms | Forward | United States | Played for the USA-U18 team |

== Regular season ==
=== Standings ===
2022–23 Western Collegiate Hockey Association standings
| | Conference | | | | | | | | Overall | | | | | |
| | GP | W | L | T | SOW | PTS | GF | GA | GP | W | L | T | GF | GA |
|---|---|---|---|---|---|---|---|---|---|---|---|---|---|---|
| #2 Ohio State † | 28 | 23 | 4 | 1 | 1 | 70 | 119 | 52 | 40 | 33 | 6 | 2 | 169 | 71 |
| #3 Minnesota * | 28 | 22 | 3 | 3 | 1 | 68 | 126 | 52 | 39 | 30 | 6 | 3 | 177 | 72 |
| #1 Wisconsin | 27 | 19 | 6 | 2 | 1 | 60 | 113 | 46 | 40 | 29 | 10 | 2 | 169 | 67 |
| #7 Minnesota Duluth | 28 | 17 | 8 | 3 | 2 | 54 | 87 | 44 | 39 | 26 | 10 | 3 | 125 | 53 |
| #12 St. Cloud State | 28 | 11 | 16 | 1 | 0 | 36 | 57 | 82 | 37 | 18 | 18 | 1 | 87 | 96 |
| Minnesota State | 28 | 9 | 18 | 1 | 0 | 30 | 55 | 92 | 36 | 15 | 20 | 1 | 91 | 105 |
| St. Thomas | 28 | 3 | 24 | 1 | 1 | 12 | 30 | 110 | 36 | 8 | 27 | 1 | 53 | 130 |
| Bemidji State | 28 | 2 | 26 | 0 | 0 | 6 | 23 | 130 | 36 | 5 | 30 | 1 | 40 | 154 |
Championship: March 4, 2023 † indicates conference regular season champion; * indicates conference tournament champion Rankings: USCHO.com; updated March 19, 2023

=== Schedule ===
| Date | Time | Opponent^{#} | Rank^{#} | Site | Decision | Result | Attendance | Record |
Regular Season
| September 22 | 6:00 PM | at #14 Penn State* | #3 | Pegula Ice Arena • State College, PA | Kronish | L 1–4 | 534 | 0–1–0 |
| September 23 | 6:00 PM | at #14 Penn State* | #3 | Pegula Ice Arena • State College, PA | Gervais | W 9–1 | 735 | 1–1–0 |
| September 29 | 7:00 PM | at Lindenwood* | #5 | LaBahn Arena • Madison, WI | Kronish | W 6–0 | 2,171 | 2–1–0 |
| September 30 | 7:00 PM | at Lindenwood* | #5 | LaBahn Arena • Madison, WI | Gervais | W 10–0 | 2,273 | 3–1–0 |
| October 7 | 7:00 PM | St. Thomas | #5 | LaBahn Arena • Madison, WI | Kronish | W 5–0 | 2,273 | 4–1–0 (1–0–0) |
| October 8 | 6:00 PM | St. Thomas | #5 | LaBahn Arena • Madison, WI | Gervais | W 9–1 | 2,273 | 5–1–0 (2–0–0) |
| October 14 | 6:00 PM | at St. Cloud State | #4 | Herb Brooks National Hockey Center • St. Cloud, MN | Kronish | W 5–0 | 332 | 6–1–0 (3–0–0) |
| October 15 | 3:00 PM | at St. Cloud State | #4 | Herb Brooks National Hockey Center • St. Cloud, MN | Gervais | W 3–2 ^{OT} | 359 | 7–1–0 (4–0–0) |
| October 20 | 7:00 PM | Bemidji State | #5 | Labahn Arena • Madison, WI | Kronish | W 8–0 | 2,075 | 8–1–0 (5–0–0) |
| October 21 | 7:00 PM | Bemidji State | #5 | Labahn Arena • Madison, WI | Gervais | W 7–1 | 2,273 | 9–1–0 (6–0–0) |
| October 28 | 7:00 PM | at #5 Minnesota Duluth | #3 | AMSOIL Arena • Duluth, MN | Kronish | L 1–2 ^{OT} | 888 | 9–2–0 (6–1–0) |
| October 29 | 3:00 PM | at #5 Minnesota Duluth | #3 | AMSOIL Arena • Duluth, MN | Gervais | W 4–3 | 916 | 10–2–0 (7–1–0) |
| November 19 | 2:00 PM | #1 Minnesota | #3 | Labhan Arena • Madison, WI | Kronish | T 3–3 ^{SOL} | 2,273 | 10–2–1 (7–1–1) |
| November 20 | 2:00 PM | #1 Minnesota | #3 | Labhan Arena • Madison, WI | Kronish | W 4–1 | 2,273 | 11–2–1 (8–1–1) |
| December 2 | 3:00 PM | at Bemidji State | #2 | Sanford Center • Bemidji, MN | Kronish | W 13–1 | 213 | 12–2–1 (9–1–1) |
| December 3 | 2:00 PM | at Bemidji State | #2 | Sanford Center • Bemidji, MN | Kronish | W 4–1 | 317 | 13–2–1 (10–1–1) |
| December 9 | 6:00 PM | at Minnesota State | #2 | Mayo Clinic Health System Event Center • Mankato, MN | Kronish | W 5–2 | 175 | 14–2–1 (11–1–1) |
| December 10 | 3:00 PM | at Minnesota State | #2 | Mayo Clinic Health System Event Center • Mankato, MN | Kronish | W 5–1 | 233 | 15–2–1 (12–1–1) |
| December 31 | 2:00 PM | at #4 Quinnipiac | #2 | People's United Center • Hamden, CT | Kronish | W 3–0 | 885 | 16–2–1 |
| January 1 | 2:00 PM | at #4 Quinnipiac | #2 | People's United Center • Hamden, CT | Kronish | L 0–3 | 853 | 16–3–1 |
| January 7 | 2:00 PM | #8 Minnesota Duluth | #2 | Labhan Arena • Madison, WI | Kronish | L 1–3 | 2,273 | 16–4–1 (12–2–1) |
| January 8 | 2:00 PM | #8 Minnesota Duluth | #2 | Labhan Arena • Madison, WI | Gervais | L 0–1 | 2,273 | 16–5–1 (12–3–1) |
| January 13 | 5:00 PM | at #1 Ohio State | #8 | The Ohio State University Ice Rink • Columbus, OH | Kronish | L 1–2 ^{OT} | 680 | 16–6–1 (12–4–1) |
| January 14 | 2:00 PM | at #1 Ohio State | #8 | The Ohio State University Ice Rink • Columbus, OH | Gervais | L 0–5 | 683 | 16–7–1 (12–5–1) |
| January 21 | 2:00 PM | Minnesota State | #8 | Labhan Arena • Madison, WI | Kronish | W 2–1 | 2,273 | 17–7–1 (13–5–1) |
| January 22 | 2:00 PM | Minnesota State | #8 | Labhan Arena • Madison, WI | Kronish | W 6–0 | 2,273 | 18–7–1 (14–5–1) |
| January 27 | 6:00 PM | at St. Thomas | #8 | St. Thomas Ice Arena • Mendota Heights, MN | Kronish | W 6–1 | 501 | 19–7–1 (15–5–1) |
| January 28 | 6:00 PM | at St. Thomas | #8 | St. Thomas Ice Arena • Mendota Heights, MN | Gervais | W 3–0 | 310 | 20–7–1 (16–5–1) |
| February 3 | 7:00 PM | St. Cloud State | #8 | Kohl Center • Madison, WI | Kronish | L 0–1 | 14,430 | 20–8–1 (16–6–1) |
| February 4 | 3:00 PM | St. Cloud State | #8 | Labhan Arena • Madison, WI | Gervais | W 3–2 | 2,273 | 21–8–1 (17–6–1) |
| February 10 | 6:00 PM | at #3 Minnesota | #8 | Ridder Arena • Minneapolis, MN | Kronish | T 2–2 ^{SOW} | 3,539 | 21–8–2 (17–6–2) |
| February 11 | 7:30 PM | at #3 Minnesota | #8 | Ridder Arena • Minneapolis, MN | Kronish | W 7–5 | 3,539 | 22–8–2 (18–6–2) |
| February 18 | 3:00 PM | #1 Ohio State | #6 | Labhan Arena • Madison, WI | Kronish | W 6–5 ^{OT} | 2,273 | 23–8–2 (19–6–2) |
| February 19 | 2:00 PM | #1 Ohio State | #6 | Labhan Arena • Madison, WI | Kronish | L 1–3 | 2,273 | 23–9–2 (19–7–2) |
WCHA Tournament
| February 24 | 7:00 PM | Minnesota State | #6 | Labhan Arena • Madison, WI (First Round) | Kronish | W 3–0 | 1,823 | 24–9–2 |
| February 25 | 3:00 PM | Minnesota State | #6 | Labhan Arena • Madison, WI (First Round) | Kronish | W 4–1 | 2,273 | 25–9–2 |
| March 3 | 5:00 PM | vs. #3 Minnesota | #6 | Ridder Arena • Minneapolis, MN (Final FaceOff Semifinals) | Kronish | L 2–4 | 2,334 | 25–10–2 |
NCAA Tournament
| March 9 | 5:00 PM | vs. LIU | #6 | Class of 1965 Arena • Hamilton, NY (First Round) | Kronish | W 9–1 | 227 | 26–10–2 |
| March 11 | 2:00 PM | vs. #3 Colgate | #6 | Class of 1965 Arena • Hamilton, NY (National Quarterfinals) | Kronish | W 4–2 | 1,349 | 27–10–2 |
| March 17 | 6:00 PM | vs. #2 Minnesota | #6 | AMSOIL Arena • Duluth, MN (Frozen Four Semifinal) | Kronish | W 3–2 ^{OT} | 3,425 | 28–10–2 |
| March 19 | 3:00 PM | vs. #1 Ohio State | #6 | AMSOIL Arena • Duluth, MN (Frozen Four National Championship) | Kronish | W 1–0 | 3,940 | 29–10–2 |
*Non-conference game. ^{#}Rankings from USCHO.com Poll.

== Home attendance ==
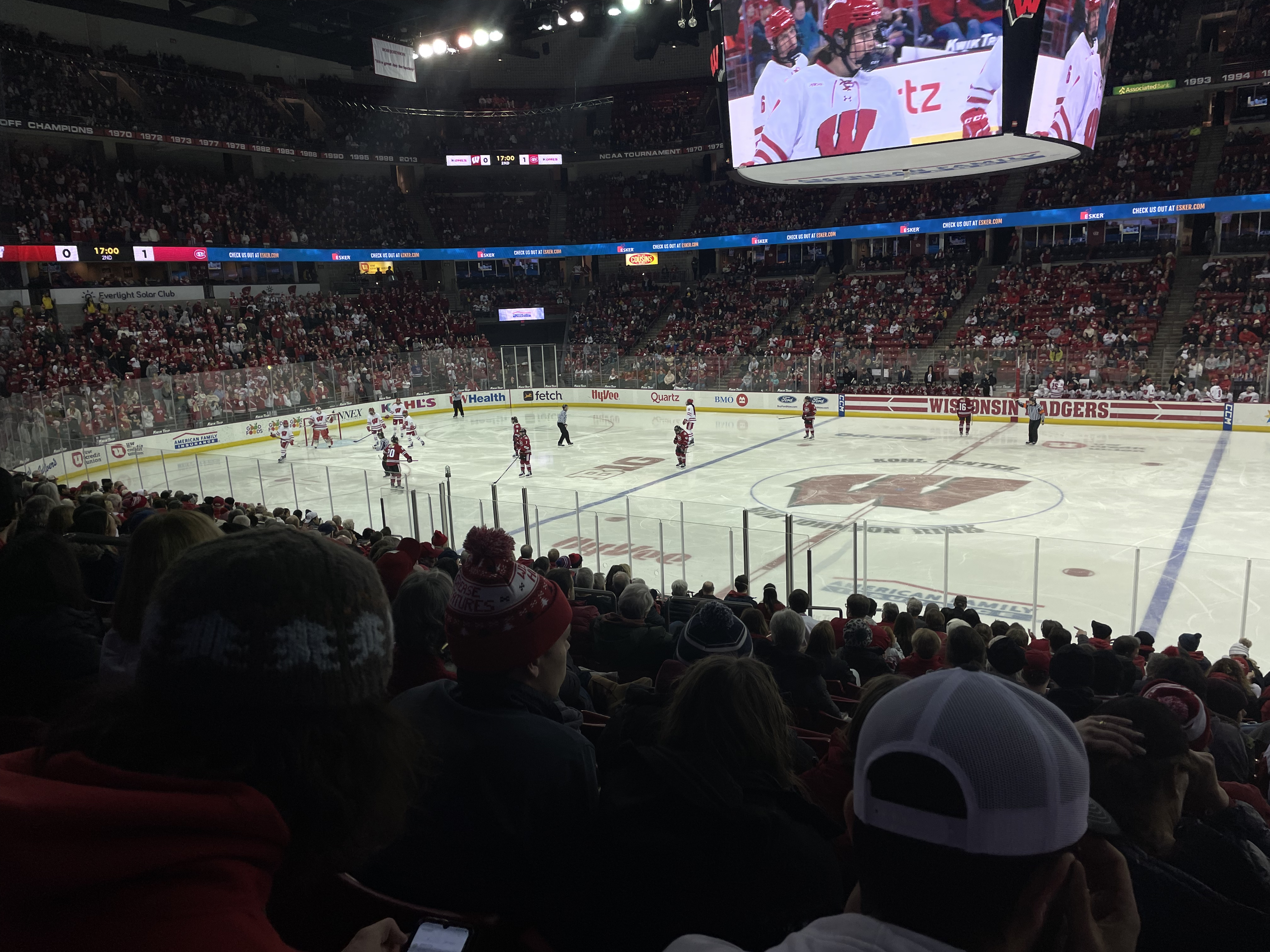
February 3, 2023 against St. Cloud State at the Kohl Center

Wisconsin led all NCAA Division I women's ice hockey programs in both average and total home attendance, averaging 2,907 spectators and totaling 52,321 spectators. This marked the sixth consecutive instance (Note: excluding the 2020-21 season, in which NCAA Division I hockey was played without spectators due to the COVID-19 pandemic) in which the program led in these measurements of attendance.

The 14,430 spectators that attended the February 3 home game at the Kohl Center against St. Cloud State marked the second-highest attendance up-to-that-point in NCAA Division I women's ice hockey history. second only to the attendance for Wisconsin's January 14, 2017 home match against the same team during its 2016–17 Wisconsin Badgers women's ice hockey season (15,359), and surpassing the attendance of Wisconsin's February 15, 2020 home match against Ohio State during its 2019–20 season (14,361).

== Roster ==
| Number | Player | Position | Class | Height | Hometown |
|---|---|---|---|---|---|
| 1 | Jane Gervais | G | R-So. | 5-8 | Valcourt, Quebec |
| 2 | Natalie Buchbinder | D | Gr. | 5–8 | Fairport, New York |
| 3 | Sophie Helgeson | D | So. | 5–6 | Roseau, Minnesota |
| 4 | Caroline Harvey | D | Fr. | 5–7 | Salem, New Hampshire |
| 6 | Lacey Eden | F | R-So. | 5–8 | Annapolis, Maryland |
| 7 | Jesse Compher | F | Gr. | 5–8 | Northbrook, Illinois |
| 9 | Sophie Shirley | F | Gr. | 5–9 | Saskatoon, Saskatchewan |
| 10 | Laila Edwards | F | Fr. | 6-0 | Cleveland, Ohio |
| 12 | Grace Shirley | F | Sr. | 5–7 | Saskatoon, Saskatchewan |
| 14 | Mayson Toft | D | Jr. | 5–8 | Lowry, Minnesota |
| 16 | Claire Enright | F | Fr. | 5–5 | Lakeville, Minnesota |
| 17 | Britta Curl | F | R-Sr. | 5–8 | Bismarck, North Dakota |
| 18 | Marianne Picard | F | R-Fr. | 5–6 | Repentigny, Quebec |
| 20 | Vivian Jungels | D | Fr. | 5–7 | Edina, Minnesota |
| 21 | Nicole LaMantia | D | Gr. | 5–4 | Wayne, Illinois |
| 23 | Sarah Wozniewicz | F | So. | 5–7 | Cochrane, Alberta |
| 24 | Kaitlyn Kotlowski | D | R-Jr. | 5–10 | Warroad, Minnesota |
| 25 | Chayla Edwards | D | Sr. | 5–9 | Cleveland, Ohio |
| 26 | Casey O'Brien | F | Jr. | 5–4 | Milton, Massachusetts |
| 27 | Kirsten Simms | F | Fr. | 5–5 | Plymouth, Minnesota |
| 28 | Maddi Wheeler | F | Jr. | 5–4 | Erinsville, Ontario |
| 30 | Cami Kronish | G | R-Sr. | 6-0 | New York, New York |
| 32 | Chloe Baker | G | Fr. | 5–6 | Hermosa Beach, California |
