= 2022–23 Ohio State Buckeyes women's ice hockey season =

National Championship, L, 0–1 vs Wisconsin
- Conference: WCHA
- Home ice: The Ohio State University Ice Rink

Rankings
- USA Today: #1
- USCHO.com: #1

Record
- Overall: 33–6–0
- Home: 16–1–0
- Road: 15–4–0

Coaches and captains
- Head coach: Nadine Muzerall
- Assistant coaches: Peter Elander; Kelsey Cline; Bailey Seagraves

The Ohio State Buckeyes women's ice hockey program will represent the Ohio State University during the 2022-23 NCAA Division I women's ice hockey season.

== Offseason ==
=== Recruiting ===
Player	Position	Nationality	Notes
Alaina Giampietro	Forward	United States	Played for Gilmour Academy
Gali Levy	Forward	United States	Played for Buckingham Browne & Nichols
Emerson Jarvis	Forward	Canada	Played for the Edmonton U-18 Pandas
Sofie Lundin	Forward	Sweden	Played for the Sweden National Team
Sloane Matthews	Forward	United States	Played for Minnesota Jr. Whitecaps
Sydney Morrow	Defense	United States	Played for Shattuck-Saint Mary's
Emma Peschel	Defense	United States	Played for Benilde-St. Margaret's
Lexington Secreto	Goalie	United States	Played for the CT Polar Bears
Makenna Webster	Forward	United States	Transfer from Wisconsin

== Roster ==
=== 2022–23 Buckeyes ===
No.	Nat.	Player	Class	Pos	Height	DoB	Hometown	Previous team
1		Raygan Kirk	Senior	G	5' 8" (1.73 m)		Ste. Anne, Manitoba	Robert Morris
2		Emerson Jarvis	Freshman	F	5' 4" (1.63 m)		Mundare, Alberta	Edmonton Pandas
4		Ramsey Parent	Senior	F	5' 6" (1.68 m)		Blaine, Minnesota	Blaine Bengals
5		Teagan Grant	Senior	D	5' 6" (1.68 m)		New Liskeard, Ontario	Wisconsin
6		Hadley Hartmetz	Senior	D	5' 5" (1.65 m)		Phoenixville, Pennsylvania	Boston College
7		Emma Peschel	Freshman	D	5' 10" (1.78 m)		Edina, Minnesota	Benilde-St. Margaret's
8		Brooke Bink	Senior	F	5' 5" (1.65 m)		Escanaba, Michigan	Shattuck Saint Mary's
9		Madison Bizal	Graduate	D	5' 4" (1.63 m)		Elk River, Minnesota	Elk River High School
10		Jenna Buglioni	Junior	F	5' 3" (1.6 m)		Port Moody, British Columbia	Greater Vancouver Comets
11		Kenzie Hauswirth	Senior	F	5' 5" (1.65 m)		Farmington, Minnesota	Quinnipiac
12		Jennifer Gardiner	Senior	F	5' 6" (1.68 m)		Surrey, British Columbia	Greater Vancouver Comets
13		Riley Brengman	Junior	D	5' 5" (1.65 m)		China, Michigan	Belle Tire
14		Alaina Giampietro	Freshman	F	5' 6" (1.68 m)		Strongsville, Ohio	Gilmour Academy
15		Gabby Rosenthal	Graduate	F	5' 7" (1.7 m)		Blaine, Minnesota	Blaine High School
17		Emma Maltais	Graduate	F	5' 4" (1.63 m)		Burlington, Ontario	Oakville Hornets
18		Sophie Jaques	Graduate	D	5' 8" (1.73 m)		Toronto, Ontario	Toronto Aeros
19		Lauren Bernard	Senior	D	5' 7" (1.7 m)		Madison, Ohio	Clarkson
20		Makenna Webster	Junior	F	5' 2" (1.57 m)		St. Louis, Missouri	Wisconsin
21		Sydney Morrow	Freshman	D	5' 7" (1.7 m)		Darien, Connecticut	Shattuck St. Mary's
22		Sloane Matthews	Freshman	F	5' 6" (1.68 m)		Plymouth, Minnesota	Wayzata High School
24		Jamie Grinder	Sophomore	D	5' 10" (1.78 m)		Richmond, British Columbia	Delta Hockey Academy
27		Paetyn Levis	Graduate	F	5' 5" (1.65 m)		Rogers, Minnesota	Rogers High School
28		Sofie Lundin	Freshman	F	5' 5" (1.65 m)		Helsingborg, Sweden	Djurgarden IF
29		Gail Levy	Freshman	F	5' 3" (1.6 m)		Newton, Massachusetts	NAHA
32		Amanda Thiele	Junior	G	5' 10" (1.78 m)		Milford, Michigan	Belle Tire
34		Lexington Secreto	Freshman	G	5' 7" (1.7 m)		New Windsor, New York	CT Polar Bears
35		Quinn Kuntz	Senior	G	5' 7" (1.7 m)		Warroad, Minnesota	Polar Xpress

== Regular season ==
=== Standings ===
2022–23 Western Collegiate Hockey Association standings
	Conference								Overall					
	GP	W	L	T	SOW	PTS	GF	GA	GP	W	L	T	GF	GA
#2 Ohio State †	28	23	4	1	1	70	119	52	40	33	6	2	169	71
#3 Minnesota *	28	22	3	3	1	68	126	52	39	30	6	3	177	72
#1 Wisconsin	27	19	6	2	1	60	113	46	40	29	10	2	169	67
#7 Minnesota Duluth	28	17	8	3	2	54	87	44	39	26	10	3	125	53
#12 St. Cloud State	28	11	16	1	0	36	57	82	37	18	18	1	87	96
Minnesota State	28	9	18	1	0	30	55	92	36	15	20	1	91	105
St. Thomas	28	3	24	1	1	12	30	110	36	8	27	1	53	130
Bemidji State	28	2	26	0	0	6	23	130	36	5	30	1	40	154
Championship: March 4, 2023 † indicates conference regular season champion; * indicates conference tournament champion Rankings: USCHO.com; updated March 19, 2023

=== Schedule ===
Date	Time	Opponent^{#}	Rank^{#}	Site	Decision	Result	Record	
Regular Season
Sep 30	6:00 pm	at Minnesota State	#1	Mayo Clinic Health System Event Center • Mankato, MN	Thiele	W 2–1	512	1–0–0 (1–0–0)
Oct 1	2:00 pm	at Minnesota State	#1	Mayo Clinic Health System Event Center • Makato, MN	Thiele	W 5–4	250	2–0–0 (2–0–0)
Oct 7	5:00 pm	St Cloud State	#1	The Ohio State University Ice Rink • Columbus, OH	Kirk	W 5–2	679	3–0–0 (3–0–0)
Oct 8	2:00 pm	St Cloud State	#1	The Ohio State University Ice Rink • Columbus, OH	Thiele	W 6–2	636	4–0–0 (4–0–0)
Oct 15	3:00 pm	at Bemidji State	#1	Sanford Center • Bemidji, MN	Kirk	W 4–0	504	5–0–0 (5–0–0)
Oct 16	2:00 pm	Bemidji State	#1	Sanford Center • Bemidji, MN	Thiele	W 5–2	278	6–0–0 (6–0–0)
Oct 21	5:00 pm	#4 Minnesota Duluth	#1	The Ohio State University Ice Rink • Columbus, OH	Thiele	W 3–2 ^{OT}	556	7–0–0 (7–0–0)
Oct 22	2:00 pm	#4 Minnesota Duluth	#1	The Ohio State University Ice Rink • Columbus, OH	Thiele	W 3–2	569	8–0–0 (8–0–0)
Oct 28	5:00 pm	#2 Minnesota	#1	The Ohio State University Ice Rink • Columbus, OH	Thiele	L 2–4	421	8–1–0 (8–1–0)
Oct 29	2:00 pm	#2 Minnesota	#1	The Ohio State University Ice Rink • Columbus, OH	Kirk	T 4–4 ^{SO}	319	8–1–1 (8–1–1)
Nov 5	6:00 pm	at St. Thomas	#2	St. Thomas Ice Arena • St. Paul, MN	Kuntz	W 4–0	395	9–1–1 (9–1–1)
Nov 6	2:00 pm	at St. Thomas	#2	St. Thomas Ice Arena • St. Paul, MN	Thiele	W 6–0	255	10–1–1 (10–1–1)
Nov 18	6:00 pm	Bemidji State	#2	The Ohio State University Ice Rink • Columbus, OH	Thiele	W 5–0	458	11–1–1 (11–1–1)
Nov 19	2:00 pm	Bemidji State	#2	The Ohio State University Ice Rink • Columbus, OH	Kirk	W 7–1	601	12–1–1 (12–1–1)
Nov 22	5:00 pm	#6 Colgate	#1	The Ohio State University Ice Rink • Columbus, OH	Thiele	T 4–4 ^{OT}	597	12–1–2 (12–1–1)
Nov 23	2:00 pm	#6 Colgate	#1	The Ohio State University Ice Rink • Columbus, OH	Kirk	W 6–2	407	13–1–2 (12–1–1)
Dec 2	3:00 pm	#8 Minnesota Duluth	#1	Amsoil Arena • Duluth, MN	Kirk	W 2–1	911	14–1–2 (13–1–1)
Dec 3	3:00 pm	at #8 Minnesota Duluth	#1	Amsoil Arena • Duluth, MN	Kirk	L 4–5 ^{OT}	1,015	13–2–1 (13–2–2)
Dec 17	7:00 pm	#10 Cornell	#1	Lynah Rink • Ithaca, NY		W 4–3		
Dec 18	3:00 pm	#10 Cornell	#1	Lynah Rink • Ithaca, NY		W 4–3		
Dec 30	8:10 pm	Lindenwood	#1	Centene Community Ice Center • St. Charles, MO		W 9–1		
Dec 31	3:10 pm	Lindenwood	#1	Centene Community Ice Center • St. Charles, MO		W 6–0		
Jan 13	6:00 pm	#8 Wisconsin	#1	The Ohio State University Ice Rink • Columbus, OH		W 2–1 ^{OT}		
Jan 14	3:00 pm	#8 Wisconsin	#1	The Ohio State University Ice Rink • Columbus, OH		W 5–0		
Jan 20	4:00 pm	at St. Cloud State	#1	Herb Brooks National Hockey Center • St. Cloud, MN		W 6–2		
Jan 21	3:00 pm	at St. Cloud State	#1	Herb Brooks National Hockey Center • St. Cloud, MN		W 3–2 ^{OT}		
Jan 27	6:00 pm	at Minnesota State	#1	The Ohio State University Ice Rink • Columbus, OH		W 6–2		
Jan 28	3:00 pm	at Minnesota State	#1	The Ohio State University Ice Rink • Columbus, OH		W 4–2		
Feb 3	7:00 pm	#3 Minnesota	#1	Ridder Arena • Minneapolis, MN		L 2–4		
Feb 4	3:00 pm	#3 Minnesota	#1	Ridder Arena • Minneapolis, MN		W 5–1		
Feb 10	6:00 pm	St. Thomas	#1	The Ohio State University Ice Rink • Columbus, OH		W 6–1		
Feb 11	1:00 pm	St. Thomas	#1	The Ohio State University Ice Rink • Columbus, OH		W 5–0		
Feb 17	3:00 pm	at #6 Wisconsin	#1	LaBahn Arena • Madison, WI		L 5–6 ^{OT}		
Feb 18	2:00 pm	at #6 Wisconsin	#1	LaBahn Arena • Madison, WI		W 3–1		
Feb 24	6:00 pm	Bemidji State	#1	OSU Ice Rink • Columbus, OH (WCHA Quarterfinals)	Thiele	W 4–1	586	
Feb 25	3:00 pm	Bemidji State	#1	OSU Ice Rink • Columbus, OH (WCHA Quarterfinals)	Thiele	W 2–1	688	
March 3	3:00 pm	vs. #7 Minnesota Duluth	#1	Ridder Arena • Minneapolis, MN (WCHA Semifinals)	Thiele	W 2–1	2,334	31–4—2
March 4	2:00 pm	vs. #3 Minnesota	#1	Ridder Arena • Minneapolis, MN (WCHA Championship)	Thiele	L 1–3	2,616	31–5–2
March 11	5:00 pm	#8 Quinnipiac	#1	OSU Ice Rink • Columbus, OH (NCAA Quarterfinals)	Thiele	W 5–2	750	32–5–2
March 17	2:30pm	vs. #5 Northeastern	#1	AMSOIL Arena • Duluth, MN (NCAA Frozen Four)	Thiele	W 3–0	3,443	33–5–2
March 19	3:00pm	#6 Wisconsin	#1	AMSOIL Arena • Duluth, MN (NCAA Championship)	Thiele	L 0–1	3,940	33–6–2
*Non-conference game. ^{#}Rankings from USCHO.com Poll.
