= 2021–22 Minnesota Golden Gophers women's ice hockey season =

NCAA Quarterfinals, L 2–1 v. Minnesota Duluth
- Conference: 1 WCHA
- Home ice: Ridder Arena

Rankings
- USA Today/USA Hockey Magazine: 2
- USCHO.com: 2

Record
- Overall: 29–9–1
- Conference: 21–6–1
- Home: 15–6–0
- Road: 13–2–1
- Neutral: 1–1–0

Coaches and captains
- Head coach: Brad Frost (15th season)
- Assistant coaches: Natalie Darwitz; Jake Bobrowski
- Captain(s): Emily Brown; Olivia Knowles

The 2021–22 Minnesota Golden Gophers women's ice hockey season was the team's 25th season of play for the program. They represented the University of Minnesota in WCHA women's ice hockey during the 2021–22 NCAA Division I women's ice hockey season. They were coached by Brad Frost in his 15th season. They Golden Gophers won the WCHA regular-season title, but lost to Ohio State 3–2 in the conference tournament finals on home ice.

After the conference tournament, the Gophers were selected as an at-large bid for the 2022 NCAA tournament, gaining the second seed overall, behind Ohio State. They lost to the University of Minnesota–Duluth Bulldogs 2–1 at Ridder Arena in the NCAA Tournament Quarterfinals.

== Offseason ==
=== Recruiting ===
Player	Position	Nationality	Notes
Sadie Lindsay	Forward	United States	Attended Breck School
Emily Zumwinkle	Defense	United States	Attended Breck School – Sister of Grace Zumwinkle
Peyton Hemp	Forward	United States	Attended Andover High School – 2021 Winner of Minnesota Ms. Hockey Award
Emma Conner	Forward	United States	Attended Edina High School
Tristana Tatur	Forward	United States	Attended Maple Grove Senior High School
Ella Huber	Forward	United States	Played for Chicago Mission
Skylar Vetter	Goaltender	United States	Attended Lakeville North High School

== Standings ==
2021–22 Western Collegiate Hockey Association standings
	Conference								Overall					
	GP	W	L	T	SW	PTS	GF	GA	GP	W	L	T	GF	GA
#4 Minnesota †	28	21	6	1	1	68	122	57	39	29	9	1	169	72
#1 Ohio State*	27	21	6	0	0	63	125	43	38	32	6	0	175	58
#6 Wisconsin	27	18	6	3	2	57	98	44	38	26	8	4	144	56
#2 Minnesota Duluth	28	19	8	1	0	58	102	54	40	27	12	1	137	84
Minnesota State	28	10	17	1	1	32	61	100	35	15	19	1	95	120
Bemidji State	28	8	18	2	0	25	43	104	34	11	20	3	55	117
St. Cloud State	27	4	20	3	2	17	43	100	35	9	23	3	65	124
St. Thomas	27	3	23	1	0	10	31	123	33	5	27	1	41	142
Championship: March 6, 2022 † indicates conference regular season champion; * indicates conference tournament champion Rankings: USCHO.com; updated March 20, 2022

== Roster ==
No.	Nat.	Player	Class	Pos	Height	DoB	Hometown	Previous team
1		Olivia King	Junior	F	5' 6" (1.68 m)	2001-01-05	Garrison, Minnesota	Brainerd High School
2		Emily Brown	Graduate	D	5' 7" (1.7 m)	1998-12-30	Blaine, Minnesota	Blaine High School
3		Catie Skaja	Senior	F	5' 7" (1.7 m)	1999-06-28	New Prague, Minnesota	New Prague High School
4		Audrey Wethington	Sophomore	F	5' 7" (1.7 m)	2002-04-01	Edina, Minnesota	Blake School
5		Madeline Wethington	Junior	D	5' 10" (1.78 m)	2000-07-14	Edina, Minnesota	Blake School
6		Gracie Ostertag	Senior	D	5' 7" (1.7 m)	2000-02-14	Shakopee, Minnesota	Shattuck-Saint Mary's
8		Sadie Lindsay	Freshman	F	5' 7" (1.7 m)	2003-07-03	Minnetonka, Minnesota	Breck School
9		Taylor Heise	Senior	F	5' 10" (1.78 m)	2000-03-17	Lake City, Minnesota	Red Wing High School
10		Emily Zumwinkle	Freshman	D	5' 9" (1.75 m)	2003-05-20	Excelsior, Minnesota	Breck School
11		Kyleigh Hanzlik	Senior (RS)	F	5' 9" (1.75 m)	1998-06-30	Wisconsin Rapids, Wisconsin	Robert Morris Colonials (College Hockey America)
13		Crystalyn Hengler	Senior	D	5' 8" (1.73 m)	1999-09-11	Eden Prairie, Minnesota	Eden Prairie High School
14		Maggie Nicholson	Sophomore	D	5' 9" (1.75 m)	2002-03-21	Minnetonka, Minnesota	Minnetonka High School
15		Peyton Hemp	Freshman	F	5' 5" (1.65 m)	2003-05-15	Andover, Minnesota	Andover High School
16		Amy Potomak	Senior (RS)	F	5' 6" (1.68 m)	1999-06-25	Aldergrove, British Columbia	George Eliot Secondary
17		Josey Dunne	Sophomore	D	5' 10" (1.78 m)	2002-02-11	O'Fallon, Missouri	Heritage Christian Academy
20		Emma Conner	Freshman	F	5' 9" (1.75 m)	2002-10-01	Edina, Minnesota	Edina High School
21		Emily Oden	Senior	F	5' 8" (1.73 m)	1999-11-14	Edina, Minnesota	Edina High School
22		Abigail Boreen	Senior	F	5' 6" (1.68 m)	2000-04-03	Somerset, Wisconsin	Hill-Murray School
23		Tristana Tatur	Freshman	F	5' 8" (1.73 m)	2003-02-03	Maple Grove, Minnesota	Maple Grove Senior High School
24		Olivia Knowles	Graduate	D	5' 9" (1.75 m)	1999-01-24	Campbell River, British Columbia	Penticton Secondary School
26		Ella Huber	Freshman	F	5' 6" (1.68 m)	2002-12-18	Northfield, Illinois	New Trier High School
27		Savannah Norcross	Senior	F	5' 7" (1.7 m)	2000-06-10	Lynn, Massachusetts	New Hampton School
31		Skylar Vetter	Freshman	G	5' 8" (1.73 m)	2003-05-14	Lakeville, Minnesota	Lakeville North High School
33		Makayla Pahl	Junior	G	5' 11" (1.8 m)	2001-07-28	Rochester, Minnesota	Mayo High School
35		Lauren Bench	Graduate	G	5' 10" (1.78 m)	1997-11-21	Eagan, Minnesota	Bemidji State Beavers (WCHA)

== Regular season ==
=== Schedule and results ===
Source.

Date	Time	Opponent^{#}	Rank^{#}	Site	Decision	Result	Attendance	Record
Regular Season
Oct 1	7:00	#3 Ohio State		Ridder Arena • Minneapolis, MN	Lauren Bench	L 2–4	1574	0–1–0 (0–1–0)
Oct 2	3:00	#3 Ohio State		Ridder Arena • Minneapolis, MN	Skylar Vetter	L 1–4	1489	0–2–0 (0–2–0)
Oct 8	6:00	at #6/7 Minnesota Duluth		AMSOIL Arena • Duluth, MN	Bench	W 3–1	1039	1–2–0 (1–2–0)
Oct 9	3:00	at #6/7 Minnesota Duluth		AMSOIL Arena • Duluth, MN	Bench	L 4–5 ^{OT}	1004	1–3–0 (1–3–0)
Oct 15	6:00	Minnesota State		Ridder Arena • Minneapolis, MN	Makayla Pahl	W 3–0	–	2–3–0 (2–3–0)
Oct 16	4:00	at Minnesota State		Mayo Clinic Health System Event Center • Mankato, MN	Pahl	W 6–2	505	3–3–0 (3–3–0)
Oct 22	1:00	at #3 Colgate*		Class of 1965 Arena • Hamilton, NY	Pahl	W 5–3	400	4–3–0 (3–3–0)
Oct 23	1:00	at #3 Colgate*		Class of 1965 Arena • Hamilton, NY	Bench	W 3–2	957	5–3–0 (3–3–0)
Oct 29	3:00	at Bemidji State	#3	Sanford Center • Bemidji, MN	Vetter	W 5–2	284	6–3–0 (4–3–0)
Oct 30	2:00	at Bemidji State	#3	Sanford Center • Bemidji, MN	Bench	W 3–2	471	7–3–0 (5–3–0)
Nov 12	6:00	RIT*		Ridder Arena • Minneapolis, MN	Olivia King	W 10–0	1486	8–3–0 (5–3–0)
Nov 13	4:00	RIT*		Ridder Arena • Minneapolis, MN	Bench	W 7–1	1623	9–3–0 (5–3–0)
Nov 19	6:00	at St. Cloud State		Herb Brooks National Hockey Center • St. Cloud, MN	Pahl	W 6–2	500	10–3–0 (6–3–0)
Nov 20	3:00	St. Cloud State		Ridder Arena • Minneapolis, MN (2021 US Hockey Hall of Fame Museum Women's Face-Off Classic)	Vetter	W 5–1	1659	11–3–0 (7–3–0)
Nov 26	4:30	vs. Mercyhurst*	#3	Ford Ice Center • Nashville, TN (Smashville Showcase)	Bench	W 4–0	800	12–3–0 (7–3–0)
Nov 27	4:30	vs. #8 Colgate*	#3	Ford Ice Center • Nashville, TN (Smashville Showcase)	Vetter	L 1–2	1000	12–4–0 (7–3–0)
Dec 3	7:00	at #1 Wisconsin	#5	LaBahn Arena • Madison, WI	Bench	W 3–2	2273	13–4–0 (8–3–0)
Dec 4	3:00	at #1 Wisconsin	#5	LaBahn Arena • Madison, WI	Bench	T 2–2 ^{OT}	2273	13–4–1 (8–3–1)
Dec 10	7:00	#7/9 Minnesota Duluth	#3/4	Ridder Arena • Minneapolis, MN	Bench	L 2–3	–	13–5–1 (8–4–1)
Dec 11	3:30	#7/9 Minnesota Duluth	#3/4	Ridder Arena • Minneapolis, MN	Pahl	W 2–1	1834	14–5–1 (9–4–1)
Jan 8	4:00	St. Thomas	#5	Ridder Arena • Minneapolis, MN	Vetter	W 8–0	1413	15–5–1 (10–4–1)
Jan 9	2:00	at St. Thomas	#5	St. Thomas Ice Arena • Mendota Heights, MN	Bench	W 8–2	–	16–5–1 (11–4–1)
Jan 14	6:00	at Minnesota State	#4	Mayo Clinic Health System Event Center • Mankato, MN	Vetter	W 7–2	203	17–5–1 (12–4–1)
Jan 15	4:00	Minnesota State	#4	Ridder Arena • Minneapolis, MN	Pahl	L 4–5 ^{OT}	1557	17–6–1 (12–5–1)
Jan 21	6:00	#1 Wisconsin	#5	Ridder Arena • Minneapolis, MN	Pahl	W 2–1	2278	18–6–1 (13–5–1)
Jan 22	4:00	#1 Wisconsin	#5	Ridder Arena • Minneapolis, MN	Bench	W 4–3	2712	19–6–1 (14–5–1)
Jan 28	5:00	at #3/4 Ohio State	#2	The Ohio State University Ice Rink • Columbus, OH	Bench	L 1–2 ^{OT}	598	19–7–1 (14–6–1)
Jan 29	2:00	at #3/4 Ohio State	#2	The Ohio State University Ice Rink • Columbus, OH	Pahl	W 5–3	581	20–7–1 (15–6–1)
Feb 4	6:00	Bemidji State	#1	Ridder Arena • Minneapolis, MN	Bench	W 7–0	1392	21–7–1 (16–6–1)
Feb 5	4:00	Bemidji State	#1	Ridder Arena • Minneapolis, MN	Bench	W 5–2	1753	22–7–1 (17–6–1)
Feb 11	3:00	at St. Cloud State	#1	Herb Brooks National Hockey Center • St. Cloud, MN	Bench	W 5–3	342	23–7–1 (18–6–1)
Feb 12	3:00	St. Cloud State	#1	Ridder Arena • Minneapolis, MN	Pahl	W 5–1	1741	24–7–1 (19–6–1)
Feb 17	7:00	at St. Thomas	#1	St. Thomas Ice Arena • Mendota Heights, MN	Vetter	W 7–1	279	25–7–1 (20–6–1)
Feb 18	7:00	St. Thomas	#1	Ridder Arena • Minneapolis, MN	Bench	W 7–1	1730	26–7–1 (21–6–1)
WCHA Tournament
Feb 25	6:00	St. Thomas*	#1	Ridder Arena • Minneapolis, MN (First Round, Game 1)	Bench	W 4–0	937	27–7–1
Feb 26	4:00	St. Thomas*	#1	Ridder Arena • Minneapolis, MN (First Round, Game 2)	Bench	W 5–1	1146	28–7–1
Mar 5	1:00	#8 Minnesota Duluth*	#1	Ridder Arena • Minneapolis, MN (Semifinal Game)	Bench	W 5–1	–	29–7–1
Mar 6	1:00	#2 Ohio State*	#1	Ridder Arena • Minneapolis, MN (WCHA Championship Game)	Bench	L 2–3 ^{OT}	2075	29–8–1
NCAA Tournament
Mar 12	2:00	#8 Minnesota Duluth*	#2	Ridder Arena • Minneapolis, MN (Quarterfinal Game)	Bench	L 1–2	1447	29–9–1
*Non-conference game. ^{#}Rankings from USCHO.com Poll.

== Awards and honors ==
- On October 18, 2021, Makayla Pahl was named the WCHA Goaltender of the Week.
- On October 25, 2021, Abigail Boreen was named the WCHA Forward of the Week.
- Forward Peyton Hemp was named WCHA Rookie of the Month for the month of October on November 2, 2021.
- Taylor Heise was named WCHA Forward of the Month and Peyton Hemp was the WCHA Rookie of the Month for November 2021.
- On December 2, 2021, Taylor Heise was named the National Player of the Month for the month of November.
- Lauren Bench was named WCHA Goaltender of the Week, and Emily Zumwinkle was the WCHA Rookie of the Week, awarded on December 6, 2021.
- Abigail Boreen, Skylar Vetter, and Peyton Hemp were awarded weekly WCHA honors for being the top conference Forward, Goaltender, and Rookie on January 10, 2022.
- Skylar Vetter was awarded as the WCHA Rookie of the Week on January 17, 2022.
- On January 24, 2022, Taylor Heise was named WCHA Forward of the Week, and Ella Huber picked up her first career WCHA weekly honor as the conference's Rookie of the Week.
- On February 1, 2022, Taylor Heise was named as the WCHA Forward of the Month for January.
- Emily Brown was given the WCHA Defender of the Week award, while Peyton Hemp picked up another WCHA Rookie of the Week on February 7, 2022.
- Ella Huber earned her second WCHA Rookie of the Week award on February 21, 2022.
- On February 24, 2022, four Gophers were named to the three all-WCHA teams for the season. Taylor Heise was a first-team selection, Abigail Boreen was named to the second team, and Madeline Wethington and Emily Brown were named to the third team. At the same time, Peyton Hemp, Ella Huber, and Emily Zumwinkle were named to the WCHA All-Rookie Team.
- Taylor Heise was named the February WCHA Offensive Player of the Month on February 28, 2022.
- Peyton Hemp was named the February WCHA Rookie of the Month on February 28, 2022.
- Taylor Heise was named the WCHA Offensive Player of the Year on March 1, 2022.
- Peyton Hemp was named the Women's Hockey Commissioners Association National Rookie of the Year on March 1, 2022.
- Taylor Heise was named the WCHA Player of the Year on March 3, 2022.
- Peyton Hemp was named the Division I National Rookie of the Year.
- Taylor Heise won the Patty Kazmaier Award on March 26, 2022.
- On April 1, 2022, Ella Huber was named National Rookie of the Month by the Hockey Commissioner's Association for the month of March.
