= 2022–23 Minnesota Golden Gophers women's ice hockey season =

WCHA Tournament Champion
- Conference: WCHA
- Home ice: Ridder Arena

Rankings
- USA Today: #3
- USCHO.com: #3

Record
- Overall: 30–6–3
- Conference: 22–3–3–3
- Home: 15–2–1
- Road: 11–1–2
- Neutral: 4–3–0

Coaches and captains
- Head coach: Brad Frost (16th season)
- Assistant coaches: Natalie Darwitz; Jake Bobrowski
- Captain(s): Abigail Boreen; Taylor Heise; Gracie Ostertag; Grace Zumwinkle

The 2022–23 Minnesota Golden Gophers women's ice hockey season represented the University of Minnesota during the 2022–23 NCAA Division I women's ice hockey season. They were coached by Brad Frost in his 16th season. The Golden Gophers won the 2023 WCHA women's ice hockey tournament and advanced to the Frozen Four of the 2023 NCAA tournament, where they lost to Wisconsin 2–3 in overtime.

== Offseason ==
=== Recruiting ===
Player	Position	Nationality	Notes
Josefin Bouveng	Forward	Sweden	Played for Sweden at the 2022 Winter Olympics
Allie Franco	Forward/Defense	United States	Attended Hill-Murray HS
Nelli Laitinen	Defense	Finland	Won a bronze medal with Finland at the 2022 Winter Olympics
Madison Kaiser	Forward	United States	Member of the U.S. women's U18 team in 2021
Abbey Murphy	Forward	United States	Returning to the team after taking a year off to play in the 2022 Winter Olympics
Lizi Norton	Defense	United States	Transfer from Minnesota Duluth
Grace Zumwinkle	Forward	United States	Returning for her 5th year after taking a year off to play in the 2022 Winter Olympics

== Standings ==
2022–23 Western Collegiate Hockey Association standings
	Conference								Overall					
	GP	W	L	T	SOW	PTS	GF	GA	GP	W	L	T	GF	GA
#2 Ohio State †	28	23	4	1	1	70	119	52	40	33	6	2	169	71
#3 Minnesota *	28	22	3	3	1	68	126	52	39	30	6	3	177	72
#1 Wisconsin	27	19	6	2	1	60	113	46	40	29	10	2	169	67
#7 Minnesota Duluth	28	17	8	3	2	54	87	44	39	26	10	3	125	53
#12 St. Cloud State	28	11	16	1	0	36	57	82	37	18	18	1	87	96
Minnesota State	28	9	18	1	0	30	55	92	36	15	20	1	91	105
St. Thomas	28	3	24	1	1	12	30	110	36	8	27	1	53	130
Bemidji State	28	2	26	0	0	6	23	130	36	5	30	1	40	154
Championship: March 4, 2023 † indicates conference regular season champion; * indicates conference tournament champion Rankings: USCHO.com; updated March 19, 2023

== Roster ==
No.	Nat.	Player	Class	Pos	Height	DoB	Hometown	Previous team
1		Olivia King	Senior	G	5' 6" (1.68 m)	2001-01-05	Garrison, Minnesota	Brainerd High School
3		Catie Skaja	Graduate	F	5' 7" (1.7 m)	1999-07-28	New Prague, Minnesota	New Prague High School
4		Audrey Wethington	Junior	F	5' 7" (1.7 m)	2002-04-01	Edina, Minnesota	Blake School
5		Madeline Wethington	Senior	D	5' 10" (1.78 m)	2000-07-14	Edina, Minnesota	Blake School
6		Gracie Ostertag (C)	Graduate	D	5' 7" (1.7 m)	2000-02-14	Shakopee, Minnesota	Shattuck-Saint Mary's
7		Nelli Laitinen	Freshman	D	5' 7" (1.7 m)	2002-04-29	Lohja, Finland	Kiekko-Espoo
8		Sadie Lindsay	Sophomore	F	5' 7" (1.7 m)	2003-07-03	Minnetonka, Minnesota	Breck School
9		Taylor Heise (C)	Graduate	F	5' 10" (1.78 m)	2000-03-17	Lake City, Minnesota	Red Wing High School
10		Emily Zumwinkle	Sophomore	D	5' 9" (1.75 m)	2003-05-20	Excelsior, Minnesota	Breck School
11		Josefin Bouveng	Freshman	F	5' 9" (1.75 m)	2001-05-15	Vassunda, Sweden	Brynäs IF
12		Grace Zumwinkle (C)	Graduate	F	5' 9" (1.75 m)	1999-04-23	Excelsior, Minnesota	Breck School
13		Crystalyn Hengler	Graduate	D	5' 8" (1.73 m)	1999-09-11	Eden Prairie, Minnesota	Eden Prairie High School
14		Maggie Nicholson	Junior	D	5' 9" (1.75 m)	2002-03-21	Minnetonka, Minnesota	Minnetonka High School
15		Peyton Hemp	Sophomore	F	5' 5" (1.65 m)	2003-05-15	Andover, Minnesota	Andover High School
16		Allie Franco	Freshman	D	5' 7" (1.7 m)	2004-01-27	Oakdale, Minnesota	Hill-Murray School
17		Josey Dunne	Junior	F	5' 10" (1.78 m)	2002-02-11	O'Fallon, Missouri	Chicago Mission
18		Abbey Murphy	Sophomore (RS)	F	5' 5" (1.65 m)	2002-04-14	Evergreen Park, Illinois	Chicago Mission
20		Emma Conner	Sophomore	F	5' 8" (1.73 m)	2002-10-01	Edina, Minnesota	Edina High School
21		Emily Oden	Graduate	F	5' 8" (1.73 m)	1999-11-14	Edina, Minnesota	Edina High School
22		Abigail Boreen (C)	Graduate	F	5' 8" (1.73 m)	2000-04-03	Somerset, Wisconsin	Hill-Murray School
23		Tristana Tatur	Sophomore	F	5' 8" (1.73 m)	2003-02-03	Maple Grove, Minnesota	Maple Grove High School
26		Ella Huber	Sophomore	F	5' 6" (1.68 m)	2002-12-18	Northfield, Illinois	Chicago Mission
27		Savannah Norcross	Graduate	F	5' 7" (1.7 m)	2000-06-10	Lynn, Massachusetts	Boston College
28		Lizi Norton	Graduate	D	5' 5" (1.65 m)	2000-02-14	Orono, Minnesota	University of Minnesota Duluth
29		Madison Kaiser	Freshman	F	5' 7" (1.7 m)	2004-07-10	Ham Lake, Minnesota	Holy Family Catholic High School
31		Skylar Vetter	Sophomore	G	5' 8" (1.73 m)	2003-05-14	Lakeville, Minnesota	Lakeville North High School
33		Makayla Pahl	Senior	G	5' 11" (1.8 m)	2001-07-28	Rochester, Minnesota	Rochester Mayo High School
35		Sophia Johnson	Freshman	G	5' 8" (1.73 m)	2004-04-16	Minnetonka, Minnesota	Minnetonka High School

== Regular season ==
=== Schedule and results ===
As of March 3, 2023.

Date	Time	Opponent^{#}	Rank^{#}	Site	Decision	Result	Attendance	Record
Regular Season
Oct 7	6:00 pm	Bemidji State	#2	Ridder Arena • Minneapolis, MN	Pahl	W 6–0	—	1–0–0 (1–0–0)
Oct 8	2:00 pm	Bemidji State	#2	Ridder Arena • Minneapolis, MN	Vetter	W 4–1	1,259	2–0–0 (2–0–0)
Oct 14	3:00 pm	at Minnesota State	#2	Mayo Clinic Health System Event Center • Mankato, MN	Vetter	W 11–0	105	3–0–0 (3–0–0)
Oct 15	2:00 pm	Minnesota State	#2	Ridder Arena • Minneapolis, MN	Pahl	W 9–4	1,225	4–0–0 (4–0–0)
Oct 21	6:00 pm	at St. Cloud State	#2	Herb Brooks National Hockey Center • St. Cloud, MN	Vetter	W 4–2	437	5–0–0 (5–0–0)
Oct 22	2:00 pm	St. Cloud State	#2	Ridder Arena • Minneapolis, MN	Vetter	W 2–1	1,553	6–0–0 (6–0–0)
Oct 28	5:00 pm	at #1 Ohio State	#2	The Ohio State University Ice Rink • Columbus, OH	Vetter	W 4–2	421	7–0–0 (7–0–0)
Oct 29	2:00 pm	at #1 Ohio State	#2	The Ohio State University Ice Rink • Columbus, OH	Vetter	T 4–4 ^{2OT}	319	7–0–1 (7–0–1)
Nov 4	6:00 pm	#5 Minnesota Duluth	#1	Ridder Arena • Minneapolis, MN	Vetter	W 3–2 ^{OT}	2,032	8–0–1 (8–0–1)
Nov 5	2:00 pm	#5 Minnesota Duluth	#1	Ridder Arena • Minneapolis, MN	Vetter	W 5–3	2,280	9–0–1 (9–0–1)
Nov 7	7:00 pm	vs. St. Cloud State*	#1	Andover Community Center • Andover, MN (2022 U.S. Hockey Hall of Fame Museum Women's Face-Off Classic)	Vetter	L 1–4	1,250	9–1–1 (9–0–1–1)
Nov 19	2:00 pm	at #3 Wisconsin	#1	LaBahn Arena • Madison, WI	Vetter	T 3–3 ^{SO}	2,273	9–1–2 (9–0–2–2)
Nov 20	2:00 pm	at #3 Wisconsin	#1	LaBahn Arena • Madison, WI	Vetter	L 1–4	2,273	9–2–2 (9–1–2–2)
Nov 25	6:00 pm	vs. #12 Penn State*	#3	Lifeguard Arena • Henderson, NV (Henderson Collegiate Hockey Showcase)	Pahl	W 5–1	250	10–2–2 (9–1–2–2)
Nov 26	6:00 pm	vs. #5 Yale*	#3	Dollar Loan Center • Henderson, NV (Henderson Collegiate Hockey Showcase)	Vetter	L 3–4	—	10–3–2 (9–1–2–2)
Dec 2	6:00 pm	Minnesota State	#5	Ridder Arena • Minneapolis, MN	Vetter	W 4–1	1,643	11–3–2 (10–1–2–2)
Dec 3	2:00 pm	at Minnesota State	#5	Mayo Clinic Health System Event Center • Mankato, MN	Vetter	W 6–0	206	12–3–2 (11–1–2–2)
Dec 9	6:00 pm	#14 St. Cloud State	#6	Ridder Arena • Minneapolis, MN	Vetter	W 6–0	2,007	13–3–2 (12–1–2–2)
Dec 10	3:00 pm	at #14 St. Cloud State	#6	Herb Brooks National Hockey Center • St. Cloud, MN	Vetter	W 9–0	472	14–3–2 (13–1–2–2)
Jan 6	6:00 pm	Merrimack*	#5	Ridder Arena • Minneapolis, MN (East/West Showcase)	Vetter	W 9–2	2,207	15–3–2 (13–1–2–2)
Jan 7	4:30 pm	New Hampshire*	#5	Ridder Arena • Minneapolis, MN (East/West Showcase)	Pahl	W 8–1	2,249	16–3–2 (13–1–2–2)
Jan 13	6:00 pm	St. Thomas	#3	Ridder Arena • Minneapolis, MN	Vetter	W 5–0	1,813	17–3–2 (14–1–2–2)
Jan 14	2:00 pm	St. Thomas	#3	Ridder Arena • Minneapolis, MN	Vetter	W 4–1	2,210	18–3–2 (15–1–2–2)
Jan 20	3:00 pm	at Bemidji State	#3	Sanford Center • Bemidji, MN	Vetter	W 7–0	401	19–3–2 (16–1–2–2)
Jan 21	2:00 pm	at Bemidji State	#3	Sanford Center • Bemidji, MN	Vetter	W 4–1	428	20–3–2 (17–1–2–2)
Jan 27	3:00 pm	at #6 Minnesota Duluth	#3	AMSOIL Arena • Duluth, MN	Vetter	W 3–1	1,125	21–3–2 (18–1–2–2)
Jan 28	3:00 pm	at #6 Minnesota Duluth	#3	AMSOIL Arena • Duluth, MN	Vetter	W 4–3	2,094	22–3–2 (19–1–2–2)
Feb 3	6:00 pm	#1 Ohio State	#3	Ridder Arena • Minneapolis, MN	Vetter	W 4–2	2,848	23–3–2 (20–1–2–2)
Feb 4	2:00 pm	#1 Ohio State	#3	Ridder Arena • Minneapolis, MN	Vetter	L 1–5	2,865	23–4–2 (20–2–2–2)
Feb 10	6:00 pm	#8 Wisconsin	#3	Ridder Arena • Minneapolis, MN	Vetter	T 2–2 ^{SO}	3,539	23–4–3 (20–2–3–3)
Feb 11	2:00 pm	#8 Wisconsin	#3	Ridder Arena • Minneapolis, MN	Vetter	L 5–7	3,539	23–5–3 (20–3–3–3)
Feb 17	6:00 pm	at St. Thomas	#4	St. Thomas Ice Arena • St. Paul, MN	Vetter	W 2–1 ^{OT}	594	24–5–3 (21–3–3–3)
Feb 18	6:00 pm	at St. Thomas	#4	St. Thomas Ice Arena • St. Paul, MN	Vetter	W 4–2	776	25–5–3 (22–3–3–3)
WCHA Tournament
Feb 24	6:00 pm	St. Thomas	#4	Ridder Arena • Minneapolis, MN (First round)	Vetter	W 7–0	1,224	26–5–3 (22–3–3–3)
Feb 25	2:00 pm	St. Thomas	#4	Ridder Arena • Minneapolis, MN (First round)	Vetter	W 6–2	1,289	27–5–3 (22–3–3–3)
Mar 3	5:00 pm	vs. #6 Wisconsin	#3	Ridder Arena • Minneapolis, MN (Semifinals)	Vetter	W 4–2	2,334	28–5–3 (22–3–3–3)
Mar 4	2:00 pm	vs. #1 Ohio State	#3	Ridder Arena • Minneapolis, MN (Championship)	Vetter	W 3–1	2,616	29–5–3 (22–3–3–3)
NCAA Tournament
Mar 11	2:00 pm	vs. #7 Minnesota Duluth*	#2	Ridder Arena • Minneapolis, MN (National Quarterfinals)	Vetter	W 3–0	2,328	30–5–3 (22–3–3–3)
Mar 17	6:00 pm	vs. #6 Wisconsin*	#2	AMSOIL Arena • Duluth, MN (Frozen Four Semifinal Game)	Vetter	L 2–3 ^{OT}	3,425	30–6–3 (22–3–3–3)
*Non-conference game. ^{#}Rankings from USCHO.com Poll.

== Awards and honors ==
- On October 17, 2022, Grace Zumwinkle was named WCHA Forward of the Week for the eighth time.
- On October 17, 2022, Skylar Vetter was honored with her second WCHA Goaltender of the Week.
- On October 31, 2022, Taylor Heise was named WCHA Forward of the Week.
- On October 31, 2022, Skylar Vetter was honored with her third WCHA Goaltender of the Week.
- On November 1, 2022, Skylar Vetter was named the WCHA Goaltender of the Month for October.
- On November 1, 2022, Abbey Murphy was awarded with her first-ever WCHA Forward of the Month.
- On December 12, 2022, Taylor Heise was again named WCHA Forward of the Week.
- On December 12, 2022, Skylar Vetter was named WCHA Goaltender of the Week.
- On January 3, 2023, Skylar Vetter was awarded her second WCHA Goaltender of the Month this season for posting 3 shutouts and only 1 goal against during December.
- On January 4, 2023, Taylor Heise was named National Player of the Month by the Hockey Commissioners Association for December.
- On January 4, 2023, Skylar Vetter was acknowledged as the National Goaltender of the Month for her impersonation of a brick wall during December 2022.
- On January 9, 2023, Grace Zumwinkle was named WCHA Forward of the Week.
- On January 23, 2023, Taylor Heise was again acknowledged as the WCHA Forward of the Week.
- On January 23, 2023, Madison Kaiser was awarded with her first WCHA Rookie of the Week.
