= 2022–23 Penn State Nittany Lions women's ice hockey season =

CHA regular season champion CHA tournament champion
- Conference: College Hockey America
- Home ice: Pegula Ice Arena

Rankings
- USA Today: #15
- USCHO.com: #11

Record
- Overall: 27–8–2
- Conference: 12–1–1
- Home: 1–1–0
- Road: 1–1–0
- Neutral: 0–0–0

Coaches and captains
- Head coach: Jeff Kampersal (7th season)
- Assistant coaches: Allison Coomey; Makenna Newkirk
- Captain(s): Rene Gangarosa; Mallory Uihlein; Kiara Zanon

The 2022–23 Penn State Nittany Lions women's ice hockey season will represent Pennsylvania State University during the 2022–23 NCAA Division I women's ice hockey season.

== Offseason ==
=== Recruiting ===
Player	Position	Nationality	Notes
Kendall Butze	Defense	United States	Attended Selects Academy
Maddy Christian	Forward	United States	Attended Elk River High School
Courtney Correia	Forward	Canada	Grad transfer from Boston University
Katie Desa	Goalie	United States	Attended St. George's School
Tessa Janecke	Forward	United States	Played for NAHA
Eleri MacKay	Forward	United States	Grad transfer from Colgate
Katelyn Roberts	Forward	United States	Attended Chaska-Chanhassen
Leah Stecker	Defense	United States	Played for the Philadelphia Jr. Eagles

=== Departures ===
Player	Position	Nationality	Notes
Jess Ciarrocchi	Forward	United States	Transferred to Brown
Amy Dobson	Forward	Canada	Grad transfer to RIT
Natalie Heising	Forward	United States	Graduated
Cam Leonard	Goalie	United States	Graduated
Avery Mitchell	Defense	Canada	Graduated
Anna Promersberger	Forward	United States	Grad transfer to St. Thomas
Rachel Weiss	Forward	Canada	Transferred to Providence

== Standings ==
2022–23 College Hockey America standings
	Conference							Overall					
	GP	W	L	T	PTS	GF	GA	GP	W	L	T	GF	GA
#10 Penn State †*	16	14	1	1	29	78	25	38	27	9	2	140	73
Mercyhurst	16	11	3	2	24	49	25	37	21	14	2	120	80
Syracuse	16	6	9	1	13	35	57	36	10	24	2	78	118
Lindenwood	16	5	11	0	10	33	54	32	5	27	0	55	145
RIT	16	1	13	2	4	21	55	32	4	26	2	50	107
Championship: March 4, 2023 † indicates conference regular season champion; * indicates conference tournament champion Rankings: USCHO.com; updated March 19, 2023

== Schedule ==
Date	Opponent^{#}	Rank^{#}	Site	Decision	Result	Record
Regular Season
September 22	#3 Wisconsin*	#14	Pegula Ice Arena • University Park, Pennsylvania	Bothun	W 4–1	1–0–0 (0–0–0)
September 23	#3 Wisconsin*	#14	Pegula Ice Arena • University Park, Pennsylvania	Bothun	L 1–9	1–1–0 (0–0–0)
September 30	at #4 Minnesota Duluth*	#11	Appleton Arena • Canton, New York	Bothun	L 1–9	1–2–0 (0–0–0)
October 1	at St. Lawrence*	#11	Appleton Arena • Canton, New York	Bothun	W 4–2	2–2–0 (0–0–0)
October 7	#6 Colgate*	#11	Pegula Ice Arena • University Park, Pennsylvania	Bothun	L 2–3	2–3–0 (0–0–0)
October 8	#6 Colgate*	#11	Pegula Ice Arena • University Park, Pennsylvania	Bothun	L 1–2	2–4–0 (0–0–0)
October 14	at #14 Boston College*	#12	Conte Forum • Chestnut Hill, Massachusetts	Bothun	W 3–2	3–4–0 (0–0–0)
October 15	at #14 Boston College*	#12	Conte Forum • Chestnut Hill, Massachusetts	Bothun	T 2–2 ^{ot}	3–4–1 (0–0–0)
October 23	Franklin Pierce*	#13	Pegula Ice Arena • University Park, Pennsylvania	Bothun	W 6–0	4–4–1 (0–0–0)
October 24	Franklin Pierce*	#13	Pegula Ice Arena • University Park, Pennsylvania	DeSa	W 4–1	5–4–1 (0–0–0)
October 28	at Lindenwood	#12	Centene Community Ice Center • St. Charles, Missouri	Bothun	W 4–3	6–4–1 (1–0–0)
October 29	at Lindenwood	#12	Centene Community Ice Center • St. Charles, Missouri	Bothun	W 7–0	7–4–1 (2–0–0)
November 4	Mercyhurst	#11	Pegula Ice Arena • University Park, Pennsylvania	Bothun	W 4–1	8–4–1 (3–0–0)
November 5	Mercyhurst	#11	Pegula Ice Arena • University Park, Pennsylvania	Bothun	L 1–3	8–5–1 (3–1–0)
November 13	Brown*	#12	Pegula Ice Arena • University Park, Pennsylvania	Bothun	W 3–0	9–5–1 (3–1–0)
November 14	Brown*	#11	Pegula Ice Arena • University Park, Pennsylvania	Bothun	W 4–2	10–5–1 (3–1–0)
November 18	at #6 Yale*	#11	Ingalls Rink • New Haven, Connecticut	Bothun	L 0–3	10–6–1 (3–1–0)
November 19	at #6 Yale*	#11	Ingalls Rink • New Haven, Connecticut	Bothun	L 1–2 ^{ot}	10–7–1 (3–1–0)
November 25	at #3 Minnesota*	#12	Lifeguard Arena • Henderson, Nevada	Bothun	L 1–5	10–8–1 (3–1–0)
November 26	at Boston University*	#12	Dollar Loan Center • Henderson, Nevada	Bothun	W 3–0	11–8–1 (3–1–0)
December 3	Syracuse	#12	Pegula Ice Arena • University Park, Pennsylvania	Bothun	W 4–0	12–8–1 (4–1–0)
December 4	Syracuse	#12	Pegula Ice Arena • University Park, Pennsylvania	Bothun	W 11–3	13–8–1 (5–1–0)
December 30	LIU*	#12	Pegula Ice Arena • University Park, Pennsylvania	Bothun	W 4–3	14–8–1 (5–1–0)
December 31	LIU*	#12	Pegula Ice Arena • University Park, Pennsylvania	Bothun	W 4–1	15–8–1 (5–1–0)
January 13	RIT	#12	Pegula Ice Arena • University Park, Pennsylvania	Bothun	W 4–2	16–8–1 (6–1–0)
January 14	RIT	#12	Pegula Ice Arena • University Park, Pennsylvania	DeSa	T 2–2 ^{ot}	16–8–2 (6–1–1)
January 22	at Mercyhurst	#12	Mercyhurst Ice Center • Erie, Pennsylvania	Bothun	W 5–2	17–8–2 (7–1–1)
January 23	at Mercyhurst	#12	Mercyhurst Ice Center • Erie, Pennsylvania	Bothun	W 3–2 ^{ot}	18–8–2 (8–1–1)
January 27	Lindenwood	#12	Pegula Ice Arena • University Park, Pennsylvania	Bothun	W 5–1	19–8–2 (9–1–1)
January 28	Lindenwood	#12	Pegula Ice Arena • University Park, Pennsylvania	Bothun	W 6–3	20–8–2 (10–1–1)
February 3	at Syracuse	#10	Tennity Ice Pavilion • Syracuse, New York	Bothun	W 7–0	21–8–2 (11–1–1)
February 4	at Syracuse	#10	Tennity Ice Pavilion • Syracuse, New York	Bothun	W 4–1	22–8–2 (12–1–1)
February 17	at RIT	#10	Gene Polisseni Center • Rochester, New York	Bothun	W 8–1	23–8–2 (13–1–1)
February 18	at RIT	#10	Gene Polisseni Center • Rochester, New York	Bothun	W 3–1	24–8–2 (14–1–1)
CHA Tournament
February 24	vs. Lindenwood	#10	Pegula Ice Arena • University Park, Pennsylvania (Semifinals)	Bothun	W 4–1	25–8–2 (14–1–1)
February 25	vs. Lindenwood	#10	Pegula Ice Arena • University Park, Pennsylvania (Semifinals)	Bothun	W 7–1	26–8–2 (14–1–1)
March 4	vs. Mercyhurst	#10	Pegula Ice Arena • University Park, Pennsylvania (Championship)	Bothun	W 2–1 ^{ot}	27–8–2 (14–1–1)
NCAA Tournament
March 9	vs. Qunnipiac	#10	The Ohio State University Ice Rink • Columbus, Ohio (First Round)	Bothun	L 2–3 ^{3ot}	27–9–2 (14–1–1)
*Non-conference game. ^{#}Rankings from USCHO.com Poll. Source:

== Roster ==
2022-2023 Women's Ice Hockey Roster
No.	Name	Position	Year	Height	Hometown	Previous Team
3	Alyssa Machado	Forward	JR	5'6	Mississauga, Ontario	Oakville Jr. Hornets
4	Maeve Connelly	Forward	JR	5'4	West Roxbury, Massachusetts	Noble and Greenough School
5	Karley Garcia	Defense	SO	5'7	Roseville, California	NAHA
6	Carrie Byrnes	Forward	JR	5'4	Eden Prairie, Minnesota	Eden Prairie High School
7	Olivia Wallin	Forward	JR	5'7	Oakville, Ontario	Etobicoke Jr. Dolphins
9	Lexi Bedier	Forward	SO	5'8	Calgary, Alberta	Rink Hockey Academy Kelowna
10	Leah Stecker	Defense	FR	5'9	Randolph, New Jersey	Philadelphia Jr. Eagles
11	Kiara Zanon	Forward	JR	5'5	Fairport, New York	USA U-18 Team
13	Rene Gangarosa	Defense	GR	5'10	Rochester, New York	Niagara Jr. Purple Eagles
14	Julie Gough	Forward	SR	5'8	Newcastle, Ontario	Durham West Lightning
15	Tessa Janecke	Forward	FR	5'8	Orangeville, Illinois	NAHA
16	Maddy Christian	Forward	FR	5'7	Elk River, Minnesota	Elk River High School
17	Kendall Butze	Defense	FR	5'3	Cleveland, Ohio	Selects Academy
19	Mya Vaslet	Forward	SO	5'9	Stittsville, Ontario	Etobicoke Jr. Dolphins
22	Katelyn Roberts	Forward	FR	5'7	Chanhassen, Minnesota	Chaska-Chanhassen
24	Lyndie Lobdell	Defense	JR	5'7	Aurora, Illinois	USA U-18 Team
25	Courtney Correia	Forward	GR	5'6	Whitby, Ontario	Boston University
26	Mallory Uihlein	Defense	SR	5'7	Edina, Minnesota	USA U-18 Team
27	Izzy Heminger	Defense	GR	5'4	Dublin, Ohio	Ohio AAA Blue Jackets
28	Eleri MacKay	Forward	GR	5'6	Brookfield, Wisconsin	Colgate
30	Josie Bothun	Goalie	JR	5'6	Wyoming, Minnesota	Forest Lake Area High School
31	Annie Spring	Goalie	JR	5'6	Winnetka, Illinois	Chicago Mission
35	Katie Desa	Goalie	FR	5'8	Pawcatuck, Connecticut	St. George's School

== Awards ==
- Tessa Janecke named CHA Rookie of the Week (September 26, 2022).
- Courtney Correia named CHA Forward of the Week (October 3, 2022).
- Lyndie Lobdell named CHA Defensive Player of the Week (October 10, 2022).
- Head Coach Jeff Kampersal earns 400th Win (October 14, 2022).
- Lyndie Lobdell named CHA Defensive Player of the Week (October 17, 2022).
- Josie Bothun named CHA Goalie of the Week (October 17, 2022).
- Alyssa Machado named CHA Forward of the Week (October 24, 2022).
- Tessa Janecke named CHA Rookie of the Week (October 31, 2022).
- Izzy Heminger named CHA Defensive Player of the Week (October 31, 2022).
- Kiara Zanon named CHA Forward of the Month (Month of October).
- Tessa Janecke named CHA Rookie of the Month (Month of October).
- Kendall Butze named CHA Rookie of the Week (November 7, 2022).
- Josie Bothun named CHA Goalie of the Week (November 7, 2022).
- Josie Bothun named CHA Goalie of the Week (November 15, 2022).
- Kiara Zanon named CHA Forward of the Week (November 15, 2022).
- Josie Bothun named CHA Goalie of the Week (November 28, 2022).
- Josie Bothun named CHA Goalie of the Month (Month of November).
- Josie Bothun named CHA Goalie of the Week (December 5, 2022).
- Izzy Heminger named CHA Defensive Player of the Week (December 5, 2022).
- Tessa Janecke named CHA Rookie of the Week (December 5, 2022).
- Kiara Zanon named CHA Forward of the Week (January 1, 2023).
- Josie Bothun named CHA Goalie of the Week (January 1, 2023).
- Izzy Heminger named CHA Defensive Player of the Week (January 1, 2023).
- Tessa Janecke named CHA Rookie of the Week (January 1, 2023).
- Kiara Zanon named CHA Forward of the Month (Month of December).
- Josie Bothun named CHA Goalie of the Month (Month of December).
- Izzy Heminger named CHA Defensive Player of the Month (Month of December).
- Tessa Janecke named CHA Rookie of the Month (Month of December).
- Tessa Janecke named Hockey Commissioner's Association (HCA) National Rookie of the Month (Month of December).
- Josie Bothun named to HCA Goalie of the Year Watch List (January 11, 2023).
- Kiara Zanon named CHA Forward of the Week (January 16, 2023).
- Tessa Janecke named CHA Rookie of the Week (January 24, 2023).
- Eleri MacKay name CHA Forward of the Week (January 30, 2023).
- Josie Bothun named CHA Goalie of the Month (Month of January).
- Tessa Janecke named CHA Rookie of the Month (Month of January).
- Tessa Janecke named to HCA Rookie of the Year Watch List (February 2, 2023).
- Tessa Janecke named CHA Rookie of the Week (February 6, 2023).
- Kiara Zanon named CHA Forward of the Week (February 6, 2023).
- Izzy Heminger named CHA Defensive Player of the Week (February 6, 2023).
- Courtney Correia named CHA Forward of the Week (February 20, 2023).
- Tessa Janecke named CHA Rookie of the Week (February 20, 2023).
- Josie Bothun named CHA Goalie of the Week (February 20, 2023).
