= 2023–24 Wisconsin Badgers women's ice hockey season =

NCAA tournament, runner-up, L, 0–1 vs. Ohio State
- Conference: WCHA
- Home ice: LaBahn Arena

Rankings
- USA Today: #2
- USCHO.com: #2

Record
- Overall: 35-6-0
- Conference: 23–5–0
- Home: 19–2–0
- Road: 13–3–0
- Neutral: 3-1-0

Coaches and captains
- Head coach: Mark Johnson
- Assistant coaches: Dan Koch; Jackie Crum; Mark Greenhalgh
- Captain: Britta Curl

The 2023–24 Wisconsin Badgers women's ice hockey season represented the University of Wisconsin–Madison during the 2023–24 NCAA Division I women's ice hockey season. They played their home games at LaBahn Arena and were coached by Mark Johnson in his 21st season. Wisconsin finished the season appearing in the NCAA national championship game at Whittemore Center Arena in Durham, New Hampshire.

== Offseason ==
=== Recruiting ===
Player	Position	Nationality	Notes
Kelly Gorbatenko	Forward	United States	Played for Chicago Mission
Ava Murphy	Defense	Canada	Played with Canada at 2022 IIHF Under-18 Women's World Championship (held at LaBahn Arena)
Cassie Hall	Forward	United States	Played with United States at 2022 IIHF Under-18 Women's World Championship
Bella Vasseur	Forward	United States	Won two state championships with Bishop Kearney's BK Selects
Laney Potter	Defense	United States	Played with United States at 2022 IIHF Under-18 Women's World Championship
Ava McNaughton	Goaltender	United States	Played with United States at 2022 IIHF Under-18 Women's World Championship

== Roster ==
No.	Nat.	Player	Class	Pos	Height	DoB	Hometown	Previous team
1	(Canada)	Jane Gervais	Junior (RS)	G	5' 8" (1.73 m)	2003-03-20	Valcourt, Quebec	Stanstead College
3	(United States)	Sophie Helgeson	Junior	D	5' 6" (1.68 m)	2003-03-10	Roseau, Minnesota	Roseau High School
4	(United States)	Caroline Harvey	Sophomore	D	5' 8" (1.73 m)	2002-10-14	Salem, New Hampshire	North American Hockey Academy
5	(United States)	Anna Wilgren	Graduate	D	5' 8" (1.73 m)	1999-11-11	Hudson, Wisconsin	Minnesota State
6	(United States)	Lacey Eden	Junior (RS)	F	5' 8" (1.73 m)	2002-05-02	Annapolis, Maryland	Shattuck-Saint Mary's
7	(United States)	Kelly Gorbatenko	Freshman	F	5' 11" (1.8 m)	2004-08-05	Barrington, Illinois	Chicago Mission
9	(Canada)	Ava Murphy	Freshman	D	5' 9" (1.75 m)	2005-04-15	Kitchener, Ontario	Oakville Hornets
10	(United States)	Laila Edwards	Sophomore	F	6' 1" (1.85 m)	2004-01-25	Cleveland Heights, Ohio	Selects Academy
11	(United States)	Cassie Hall	Freshman	F	5' 6" (1.68 m)	2005-10-18	South Lyon, Michigan	Little Caesars
16	(United States)	Claire Enright	Sophomore	F	5' 5" (1.65 m)	2004-04-16	Farmington, Minnesota	Lakeville South High School
17	(United States)	Britta Curl (C)	Graduate	F	5' 8" (1.73 m)	2000-03-20	Bismarck, North Dakota	Bismarck Blizzard
18	(Canada)	Marianne Picard	Sophomore (RS)	F	5' 6" (1.68 m)	2002-11-13	Repentigny, Quebec	Stanstead College
19	(United States)	Bella Vasseur	Freshman	F	5' 7" (1.7 m)	2005-02-15	Oregon, Wisconsin	Bishop Kearney Selects
20	(United States)	Vivian Jungels	Sophomore	D	5' 7" (1.7 m)	2003-10-08	Edina, Minnesota	Edina High School
22	(United States)	Laney Potter	Freshman	D	5' 11" (1.8 m)	2004-12-05	Cranberry Township, Pennsylvania	Philadelphia Jr. Flyers
23	(Canada)	Sarah Wozniewicz	Junior	F	5' 7" (1.7 m)	2003-08-25	Cochrane, Alberta	Edge School
24	(United States)	Katie Kotlowski	Senior (RS)	D	5' 10" (1.78 m)	2001-08-03	Warroad, Minnesota	Warroad High School
25	(United States)	Chayla Edwards	Graduate	D	5' 9" (1.75 m)	2001-04-11	Cleveland Heights, Ohio	Pittsburgh Penguins Elite
26	(United States)	Casey O'Brien (A)	Senior	F	5' 4" (1.63 m)	2001-08-27	Milton, Massachusetts	Shattuck-Saint Mary's
27	(United States)	Kirsten Simms	Sophomore	F	5' 6" (1.68 m)	2004-08-31	Plymouth, Michigan	Little Caesars
28	(Canada)	Maddi Wheeler	Senior	F	5' 4" (1.63 m)	2002-10-10	Erinsville, Ontario	Nepean Jr. Wildcats
30	(United States)	Ava McNaughton	Freshman	G	6' 0" (1.83 m)	2004-10-27	Seven Fields, Pennsylvania	Bishop Kearney Selects
32	(United States)	Chloe Baker	Freshman (RS)	G	5' 6" (1.68 m)	2004-07-02	Hermosa Beach, California	Chicago Mission

== Regular season ==
On October 13, 2023, head coach Mark Johnson earned his 600th win with the Badgers. In a 9-0 win versus the MSU Mavericks, seven different Badgers, Kirsten Simms and Marianne Picard (two goals each), Caroline Harvey, Lacey Eden, Britta Curl, Casey O'Brien and Katie Kotlowski, scored goals. Ava McNaughton recorded 12 saves for her first career shutout as Johnson became the first coach to achieve 600 wins in NCAA women's ice hockey.

=== Standings ===
2023–24 Western Collegiate Hockey Association standings
	Conference										Overall					
	GP	W	L	T	OTW	OTL	SOW	PTS	GF	GA	GP	W	L	T	GF	GA
#1 Ohio State †	28	26	2	0	2	0	0	78	140	37	39	35	4	0	201	51
#2 Wisconsin *	28	23	5	0	2	1	0	69	124	43	41	35	6	0	205	62
#5 Minnesota	28	19	7	1	1	2	2	62	92	60	39	27	10	2	135	80
#7 Minnesota Duluth	28	15	11	2	0	0	0	47	64	47	39	21	14	4	89	66
#10 St. Cloud State	28	12	14	2	0	1	0	40	60	59	34	17	17	2	78	69
Minnesota State	28	6	22	0	1	2	0	19	52	94	38	13	25	0	97	120
St. Thomas	28	4	23	1	0	0	1	11	39	120	37	10	26	1	74	150
Bemidji State	28	3	24	1	0	0	0	10	33	144	36	4	30	2	42	181
Championship: March 9, 2024 † indicates conference regular season champion; * indicates conference tournament champion Rankings: USCHO.com; updated March 24, 2023

== Home attendance ==
Wisconsin led all NCAA Division I women's ice hockey programs in both average and total home attendance, averaging 2,269 spectators and totaling 47,652 spectators in its 21 home games. This marked the seventh consecutive instance (Note: excluding the 2020-21 season, in which NCAA Division I hockey was played without spectators due to the COVID-19 pandemic) in which the program led in these home attendance metrics.

== Awards and honors ==
- Caroline Harvey - 2023-24 CCM/AHCA Women's Division I First Team All-American
- Casey O'Brien - 2023-24 CCM/AHCA Women's Division I First Team All-American
- Kirsten Simms - 2023-24 CCM/AHCA Women's Division I First Team All-American

=== Conference honors ===
- Caroline Harvey - 2024 WCHA First Team All-Star
- Casey O'Brien - 2024 WCHA First Team All-Star
- Kirsten Simms - 2024 WCHA First Team All-Star
- Britta Curl - 2024 WCHA Second Team All-Star
- Lacey Eden - 2024 WCHA Second Team All-Star
- Cassie Hall - 2024 WCHA All-Rookie Team
- Ava Murphy - 2024 WCHA All-Rookie Team
- Laney Potter - 2024 WCHA All-Rookie Team
