= 2021–22 Ohio State Buckeyes women's ice hockey season =

National Champions Frozen Four, W, 3-2 vs UMD Bulldogs
- Conference: WCHA
- Home ice: The Ohio State University Ice Rink

Record
- Overall: 32-6-0

Coaches and captains
- Head coach: Nadine Muzerall
- Assistant coaches: Emily West; Zoe Hickel
- Captain: Liz Schepers
- Alternate captain(s): Paetyn Levis; Gabby Rosenthal

The 2021–22 Ohio State Buckeyes women's ice hockey season represented Ohio State during the 2021-22 NCAA Division I women's ice hockey season. The program went undefeated in the postseason, winning the WCHA Final Face-off and the 2022 NCAA National Collegiate women's ice hockey tournament, their first National Collegiate Women's Ice Hockey Championship.

== Offseason ==
=== Recruiting ===
Player	Position	Nationality	Notes
Jamie Grinder	Defense	Canada	
Madisyn Wiebe	Forward	Canada	

== Roster ==
=== 2021–22 Buckeyes ===
No.	Nat.	Player	Class	Pos	Height	DoB	Hometown	Previous team
1		Raygan Kirk	Junior	G	5' 8" (1.73 m)		Ste. Anne, Manitoba	Robert Morris
4		Ramsey Parent	Junior	F	5' 6" (1.68 m)		Blaine, Minnesota	Blaine Bengals
5		Teagan Grant	Junior	D	5' 6" (1.68 m)		New Liskeard, Ontario	Wisconsin
6		Hadley Hartmetz	Junior	D	5' 5" (1.65 m)		Phoenixville, Pennsylvania	Boston College
7		Eve Savander	Senior	D	5' 6" (1.68 m)		Joensuu, Finland	Team Kuortane
8		Brooke Bink	Junior	F	5' 5" (1.65 m)		Escanaba, Michigan	Shattuck Saint Mary's
9		Madison Bizal	Senior	D	5' 4" (1.63 m)		Elk River, Minnesota	Elk River High School
10		Jenna Buglioni	Sophomore	F	5' 3" (1.6 m)		Port Moody, British Columbia	Greater Vancouver Comets
11		Kenzie Hauswirth	Junior	F	5' 5" (1.65 m)		Farmington, Minnesota	Quinnipiac
12		Jennifer Gardiner	Junior	F	5' 6" (1.68 m)		Surrey, British Columbia	Greater Vancouver Comets
13		Riley Brengman	Sophomore	D	5' 5" (1.65 m)		China, Michigan	Belle Tire
14		Clair DeGeorge	Graduate	F	5' 10" (1.78 m)		Anchorage, Alaska	Bemidji State
15		Gabby Rosenthal	Senior	F	5' 7" (1.7 m)		Blaine, Minnesota	Blaine High School
16		Madisyn Wiebe	Freshman	F	5' 7" (1.7 m)		North Vancouver, British Columbia	Delta Hockey Academy
18		Sophie Jaques	Senior	D	5' 8" (1.73 m)		Toronto, Ontario	Toronto Aeros
19		Lauren Bernard	Junior	D	5' 7" (1.7 m)		Madison, Ohio	Clarkson
20		Andrea Braendli	Senior	G	5' 6" (1.68 m)		Zurich, Switzerland	EHC Schaffhausen
21		Liz Schepers (C)	Graduate	F	5' 7" (1.7 m)		Mound, Minnesota	Mound Westonka
22		Lexi Templeman	Graduate	F	5' 2" (1.57 m)		Staffa, Ontario	Robert Morris
24		Jamie Grinder	Freshman	D	5' 10" (1.78 m)		Richmond, British Columbia	Delta Hockey Academy
25		Sara Säkkinen	Senior	F	5' 4" (1.63 m)		Pirkkala, Finland	Team Kuortane
26		Emily Curlett	Graduate	D	5' 5" (1.65 m)		Columbiaville, Michigan	Robert Morris
27		Paetyn Levis	Senior	F	5' 5" (1.65 m)		Rogers, Minnesota	Rogers High School
32		Amanda Thiele	Sophomore	G	5' 10" (1.78 m)		Milford, Michigan	Belle Tire
35		Quinn Kuntz	Junior	G	5' 7" (1.7 m)		Warroad, Minnesota	Polar Xpress

== Regular season ==
=== Standings ===
2021–22 Western Collegiate Hockey Association standings
	Conference								Overall					
	GP	W	L	T	SW	PTS	GF	GA	GP	W	L	T	GF	GA
#4 Minnesota †	28	21	6	1	1	68	122	57	39	29	9	1	169	72
#1 Ohio State*	27	21	6	0	0	63	125	43	38	32	6	0	175	58
#6 Wisconsin	27	18	6	3	2	57	98	44	38	26	8	4	144	56
#2 Minnesota Duluth	28	19	8	1	0	58	102	54	40	27	12	1	137	84
Minnesota State	28	10	17	1	1	32	61	100	35	15	19	1	95	120
Bemidji State	28	8	18	2	0	25	43	104	34	11	20	3	55	117
St. Cloud State	27	4	20	3	2	17	43	100	35	9	23	3	65	124
St. Thomas	27	3	23	1	0	10	31	123	33	5	27	1	41	142
Championship: March 6, 2022 † indicates conference regular season champion; * indicates conference tournament champion Rankings: USCHO.com; updated March 20, 2022

=== Schedule ===
Date	Opponent^{#}	Rank^{#}	Site	Result	Record
Regular Season
September 24	St. Thomas Tommies		The Ohio State University Ice Rink • Columbus, OH	W 6-0	1-0-0
September 25	at St. Thomas Tommies		The Ohio State University Ice Rink • Columbus, OH	W 4-1	2-0-0
October 1	at Minnesota Golden Gophers	#4	Ridder Arena • Minneapolis, MN	W 4-2	3-0-0
October 2	Minnesota Golden Gophers	#4	Ridder Arena • Minneapolis, MN	W 4-1	4-0-0
January 29	Minnesota Golden Gophers		The Ohio State University Ice Rink • Columbus, OH	L 3-5	
WCHA Frozen Faceoff
February 25	St. Cloud State		The Ohio State University Ice Rink • Columbus, OH	W 6-0	
February 26	St. Cloud State		The Ohio State University Ice Rink • Columbus, OH	W 3-0	
NCAA Tournament
March 12	Quinnipiac Bobcats		The Ohio State University Ice Rink • Columbus, OH	W 4-3 ^{2 OT}	30-6-0
March 18	Yale Bulldogs		University Park, PA	W 2-1	31-6-0
March 20	UMD Bulldogs		University Park, PA	W 3-2	32-6-0
*Non-conference game. ^{#}Rankings from USCHO.com Poll.

== Awards and honors ==
- Sophie Jaques, 2022 WCHA Defensive Player of the Year
- Sophie Jaques, Hockey Commissioner’s Association National Player of the Month for March 2022
- Sophie Jaques, Top 3 Finalist, Patty Kazmaier Award
- Paetyn Levis, NCAA Frozen Four Most Outstanding Player
- Nadine Muzerall, WCHA Coach of the Year
