= 2023 WCHA women's ice hockey tournament =

2023 WCHA Women's ice hockey tournament
- Dates: February 24 – March 4, 2023
- Teams: 8
- Finals site: Ridder Arena; Minneapolis, Minnesota
- Champions: Minnesota (8th title)
- Winning coach: Brad Frost (5th title)
- MVP: Abbey Murphy (Minnesota)
- WCHA Women's Ice Hockey Tournaments

The 2023 WCHA Ice Hockey Tournament was the 24th edition of the WCHA Tournament. It was played between February 24 and March 4, 2023. It was hosted by the University of Minnesota at Ridder Arena. Minnesota won the championship game over Ohio State, 3–1, making it their eighth title. As the tournament winner, Minnesota received the conference's automatic bid to the 2023 NCAA Division I women's ice hockey tournament.

== Format ==
The tournament included all eight teams in the conference. Teams were ranked according to their finish in the conference standings. All quarterfinal games were best two of three and were played at the highest seeds home sites, and starting with the semifinals, single-elimination played at Ridder Arena. The tournament champion will receive an automatic bid into the 2023 NCAA National Collegiate women's ice hockey tournament.

== Standings ==
2022–23 Western Collegiate Hockey Association standings
	Conference								Overall					
	GP	W	L	T	SOW	PTS	GF	GA	GP	W	L	T	GF	GA
#2 Ohio State †	28	23	4	1	1	70	119	52	40	33	6	2	169	71
#3 Minnesota *	28	22	3	3	1	68	126	52	39	30	6	3	177	72
#1 Wisconsin	27	19	6	2	1	60	113	46	40	29	10	2	169	67
#7 Minnesota Duluth	28	17	8	3	2	54	87	44	39	26	10	3	125	53
#12 St. Cloud State	28	11	16	1	0	36	57	82	37	18	18	1	87	96
Minnesota State	28	9	18	1	0	30	55	92	36	15	20	1	91	105
St. Thomas	28	3	24	1	1	12	30	110	36	8	27	1	53	130
Bemidji State	28	2	26	0	0	6	23	130	36	5	30	1	40	154
Championship: March 4, 2023 † indicates conference regular season champion; * indicates conference tournament champion Rankings: USCHO.com; updated March 19, 2023

== Bracket ==
Quarterfinals; February 24, 25
8	Bemidji State	1	1	—
1	Ohio State	4	2	—
5	St. Cloud State	0	1	—
4	Minnesota-Duluth	1	5	—
7	St. Thomas	0	2	—
2	Minnesota	7	6	—
6	Minnesota State	0	1	—
3	Wisconsin	3	4	—

Semifinals; March 3
1	Ohio State	2
4	Minnesota-Duluth	1
2	Minnesota	4
3	Wisconsin	2

Championship; March 4
1	Ohio State	1
2	Minnesota	3

Note: * denotes overtime period(s)

== Results ==
=== Quarterfinals ===
==== (8) Bemidji State at (1) Ohio State ====
February 24, 2023; 5:00 PM	Bemidji State	1–4 (0–1, 1–2, 0–2)	Ohio State	Ohio State University Ice Rink, Columbus, Ohio; Attendance: 586

Hannah Hogenson
Goalies
Amanda Thiele
Referees:
Chris Binkley
Gui Bradshaw
Linesmen:
Tyler Iffland
Tim Katrinak

	0–1	1:38 – Jaques (Maltais)
Deering (Hunt, Anderson) – 25:43	1–1
	1–2	39:59.8 – Jaques (Maltais, Webster)
	1–3	52:40 – Jaques (Levis, Webster)
	1–4	58:59 – en – Maltais (Webster)

4 min
Penalties
2 min
13
Shots
45

February 25, 2023; 2:00 PM	Bemidji State	1–2 (0–1, 0–0, 1–1)	Ohio State	Ohio State University Ice Rink, Columbus, Ohio; Attendance: 688

Hannah Hogenson
Goalies
Amanda Thiele
Referees:
Chris Binkley
Gui Bradshaw
Linesmen:
Tyler Iffland
Tim Katrinak

	0–1	2:00 – Matthews (Hauswirth)
	0–2	56:17 – Gardiner (Rosenthal, Jaques)
Vekich (Lund, Hunt) – pp – 57:37	1–2

2 min
Penalties
6 min
16
Shots
30

==== (7) St. Thomas at (2) Minnesota ====
February 24, 2023; 6:00 PM	St. Thomas	0–7 (0–3, 0–2, 0–2)	Minnesota	Ridder Arena, Minneapolis, Minnesota; Attendance: 1,224

Saskia Maurer
Goalies
Skylar Vetter
Referees:
Tyler Olson
Duncan Ryhorchuk
Linesmen:
Marcel DuBois
Brian Jansen

0–1	1:04 – G. Zumwinkle (Murphy, Laitinen)
0–2	12:58 – G. Zumwinkle (Murphy, Oden)
0–3	19:51.5 – pp – Murphy (G. Zumwinkle, Heise)
0–4	20:56 – Heise (Skaja, Ostertag)
0–5	36:02 – Hemp (Norcross, Huber)
0–6	54:29 – M. Wethington (G. Zumwinkle, Laitinen)
0–7	54:53 – Heise (Norton)

2 min
Penalties
4 min
14
Shots
51

February 25, 2023; 2:00 PM	St. Thomas	2–6 (0–1, 1–3, 1–2)	Minnesota	Ridder Arena, Minneapolis, Minnesota; Attendance: 1,289

Saskia Maurer
Goalies
Skylar Vetter
Referees:
Tyler Olson
Duncan Ryhorchuk
Linesmen:
Marcel DuBois
Brian Jansen

	0–1	1:42 – G. Zumwinkle (Huber)
Parent (Vallario) – 21:46	1–1
	1–2	27:42 – Hengler (Kaiser)
	1–3	27:57 – Heise (Skaja, Boreen)
	1–4	29:18 – Murphy (Oden, G. Zumwinkle)
Almich – 42:40	2–4
	2–5	46:24 – Heise (Boreen, Skaja)
	2–6	59:16.2 – Skaja (Hengler, Boreen)

8 min
Penalties
6 min
24
Shots
57

==== (6) Minnesota State at (3) Wisconsin ====
February 24, 2023; 7:00 PM	Minnesota State	0–3 (0–0, 0–3, 0–0)	Wisconsin	LaBahn Arena, Madison, Wisconsin; Attendance: 1,823

Alexa Berg
Goalies
Cami Kronish
Referees:
Tyler Olson
Duncan Ryhorchuk
Linesmen:
Marcel DuBois
Brian Jansen

0–1	22:49 – Simms
0–2	25:58 – Harvey (Wheeler)
0–3	33:43 – Wozniewicz (O'Brien, Shirley)

8 min
Penalties
10 min
21
Shots
42

February 25, 2023; 3:00 PM	Minnesota State	1–4 (1–0, 0–2, 0–2)	Wisconsin	LaBahn Arena, Madison, Wisconsin; Attendance: 2,273

Alexa Berg
Goalies
Cami Kronish
Referees:
Tyler Olson
Duncan Ryhorchuk
Linesmen:
Brian Jansen
Marcel DuBois

Langseth (Butorac, Nelson) – 17:39	1–0
	1–1	30:31 – Curl (Compher, L. Edwards)
	1–2	31:54 – L. Edwards (Curl, C. Edwards)
	1–3	41:37 – Wozniewicz (Eden, Simms)
	1–4	48:36 – pp – Eden (O'Brien)

14 min
Penalties
6 min
27
Shots
51

==== (5) St. Cloud State at (4) Minnesota Duluth ====
February 24, 2023; 3:00 PM	St. Cloud State	0–1 (0–0, 0–0, 0–1)	Minnesota Duluth	AMSOIL Arena, Duluth, Minnesota; Attendance: 758

Jojo Chobak	Goalies	Emma Söderberg	Referees: Robert Ludwig; Mike Kaehler; Linesmen: Aaron Neville; Glendon Seal
0–1 / 57:26 – pp – Flaherty (Söderberg)			Referees: Robert Ludwig; Mike Kaehler; Linesmen: Aaron Neville; Glendon Seal
4 min	Penalties	6 min	Referees: Robert Ludwig; Mike Kaehler; Linesmen: Aaron Neville; Glendon Seal
23	Shots	33	Referees: Robert Ludwig; Mike Kaehler; Linesmen: Aaron Neville; Glendon Seal

February 25, 2023; 5:00 PM	St. Cloud State	1–5 (0–1, 0–3, 1–1)	Minnesota Duluth	AMSOIL Arena, Duluth, Minnesota; Attendance: 871

Sanni Ahola
Goalies
Emma Söderberg
Referees:
Robert Ludwig
Mike Kaehler
Linesmen:
Aaron Neville
Glendon Seal

	0–1	14:39 – Rogge (Hanley)
	0–2	22:12 – Hanley (Baskin, Henderson)
	0–3	38:58 – pp – O'Brien (Hanley, Jobst-Smith)
	0–4	39:41.5 – Anderson (Hughes)
Lind (Wolfe, Hall) – pp, ea – 47:35	1–4
	1–5	57:51 – en – Rogge

9 min
Penalties
6 min
24
Shots
48

=== Semifinals ===
==== (4) Minnesota Duluth vs. (1) Ohio State ====
March 3, 2023; 1:00 PM	Minnesota Duluth	1–2 (0–0, 0–2, 1–0)	Ohio State	Ridder Arena, Minneapolis, Minnesota

Emma Söderberg
Goalies
Amanda Thiele
Referees:
Tyler Olson
Duncan Ryhorchuk
Linesmen:
Mike Mueller
Doug Durgin

	0–1	30:50 – Bink
	0–2	31:48 – Maltais
Jobst-Smith (Hanley, Baskin) – ea – 17:12	1–2

8 min
Penalties
2 min
27
Shots
36

==== (3) Wisconsin vs. (2) Minnesota ====
March 3, 2023; 5:00 PM	Wisconsin	2–4 (0–1, 2–1, 0–2)	Minnesota	Ridder Arena, Minneapolis, Minnesota; Attendance: 2,334

Cami Kronish
Goalies
Skylar Vetter
Referees:
Robert Ludwig
Mike Kaehler
Linesmen:
Tyler Iffland
Glen Hagberg

	0–1	5:19 – Kaiser (Hemp)
21:54 – O'Brien	1–1
	1–2	26:13 – M. Wethington (Skaja, Heise)
32:35 – pp – LaMantia (Compher, O'Brien)	2–2
	2–3	43:44 – pp – Murphy (Skaja, G. Zumwinkle)
	2–4	58:41 – en – Skaja (Heise)

4 min
Penalties
8 min
25
Shots
32

=== Championship ===
==== (2) Minnesota vs. (1) Ohio State ====
March 4, 2023; 2:00 pm	Minnesota	3–1 (1–0, 2–1, 0–0)	Ohio State	Ridder Arena, Minneapolis, Minnesota; Attendance: 2,616

Skylar Vetter
Goalies
Amanda Thiele
Referees:
Sarma Pone
Chris Binkley
Linesmen:
Glendon Seal
Aaron Neville

Norcross (Hemp, Norton) – 14:55	1–0
Murphy (Heise, G. Zumwinkle) – pp – 32:38	2–0
	2–1	38:56 – sh – Rosenthal (Webster)
Hemp (Kaiser) – pp – 37:58	3–1

4 min
Penalties
7 min
35
Shots
35

== Tournament Awards ==
=== All-Tournament Team ===
- F: Abbey Murphy* (Minnesota)
- F: Peyton Hemp (Minnesota)
- F: Taylor Heise (Minnesota)
- D: Madeline Wethington (Minnesota)
- D: Sophie Jaques (Ohio State)
- G: Skylar Vetter (Minnesota)

* Most Outstanding Player
