= Maddi Wheeler =

Canadian ice hockey player (born 2002)

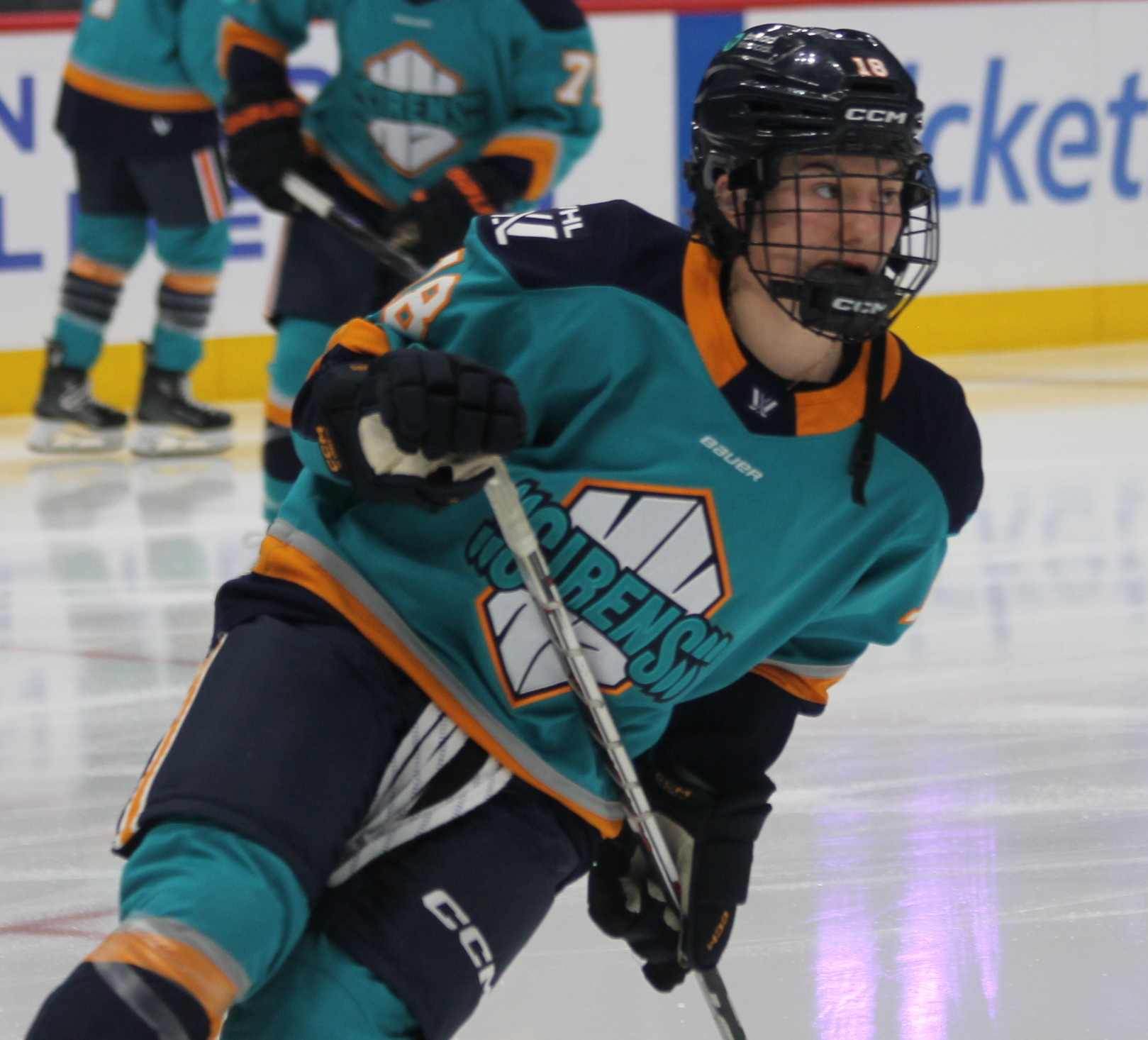
- Wheeler with the New York Sirens in 2026
- Born: October 10, 2002 (age 24) Erinsville, Ontario, Canada
- Height: 163 cm (5 ft 4 in)
- Position: Forward
- Shoots: Left
- PWHL team Former teams: San Jose Sea Lions; New York Sirens
- National team: Canada
- Playing career: 2020–present
Medal record
Women's ice hockey
Representing Canada
World U18 Championships
Gold medal – first place	2019 Japan
Silver medal – second place	2020 Slovakia

Maddi Wheeler is a Canadian professional ice hockey player who is a forward for the San Jose Sea Lions of the Professional Women's Hockey League (PWHL). She previously played for the New York Sirens of the PWHL. She played college ice hockey for four seasons with the Wisconsin Badgers, and one for the Ohio State Buckeyes as a graduate transfer. She is a two-time NCAA Champion NCAA women's ice hockey tournament, both with the Badgers.

== Early life ==
Wheeler was born on October 10, 2002 in Stone Mills, Ontario to parents Dave and Maureen. She has one older brother, Zack. Wheeler began playing hockey at the age of three.

As an eight-year old, she made the Quinte Red Devils boys' AAA team, playing above her age group for one year. She would skate six years years in the Quinte Red Devils Minor Hockey Association boys' AAA program from minor atom (2010-11) through minor bantam (2015-16)

Wheeler played for the Napanee District Secondary School Golden Hawks, her high school hockey team for four years as well as club hockey for the Nepean Jr. Wildcats U19 club of the OWHL for three years (2016-2020). During her freshman year as a Grade 9 student with the Golden Hawks, she was named Rookie of the Year. She would be named the MVP of the Golden Hawks in her sophomore year after finishing the season with a 50-point performance in 15 games, and her junior year after captaining the team to win the Kingston Area Secondary School Athletic Association (KASSAA) title, for a second straight year.

In her first season with the Wildcats (2016-17), the team caught the attention of 30 NCAA division 1 university scouts and coaches and Wheeler made a verbal commitment to join her dream school, Wisconsin University. In her third year with the Wildcats, she was named captain. Wheeler joined the Kingston Jr. Ice Wolves of the Greater Kingston Girls Hockey Association for her senior year, and was named assistant captain. In her debut with the Ice Wolves, she collected six points, typing the assist record of five.

== Playing career ==
=== College ===
In 2020, she began attending the University of Wisconsin, playing for the university's women's ice hockey program. She scored her first collegiate goal on November 28 2020, scoring the opening goal two minutes into Wisconsin's first victory of the 2020–21 season. The Badgers won the 2021 Women's Frozen Four.

In the 2021-22 season, she appeared in 36 games, recording 12 goals and 14 assists, and finishing fourth on the team in goals. In the opening game of the season against the Lindenwood Lady Lions, Wheeler scored her first WCHA goal, and had her first multi-goal game. She had a season high 4 point game, scoring 2 goals and assisting on 2 goals, in a 7-1 victory over the St. Thomas Tommies.

Wheeler played in all 41 games for the Badgers in the 2022-23 season. She posted a career-best 28 points with nine goals and 19 assists, and finished the season with a plus-minus rating of +15. The Badgers would go on to win the 2023 Women's Frozen Four; Wheeler's second championship.

In her final season with the Badgers, Wheeler played in 39 games, recording 24 points on 10 goals and 14 assists.. The 2023-24 Badgers went to the finals in the 2024 Women's Frozen Four, losing to the Buckeyes.

Looking for a postgraduate opportunity for her final season of NCAA eligibility, Wheeler entered into the transfer portal. Wheeler committed to rival Ohio State University for her final year. She played in all 37 games for her Buckeye career, recording seven goals and 14 assists for 21 points. She registered her 100th career point with an assist in the 6-0 win over Bemidji State University.

=== Professional ===
On June 24, 2025, Wheeler was drafted in the fourth round, 27th overall, by the New York Sirens in the 2025 PWHL Draft. On November 18, 2025, she signed a one-year Standard Player Agreement contract with the Sirens.

Making her PWHL debut on November 22, 2025 versus the Ottawa Charge, she assisted on all three of Taylor Girard's goals, part of a 4-0 victory. Girard not only recorded a natural hat trick, the second in league history, Wheeler set a league record for most assists in a PWHL debut. Wheeler also became the second Sirens player with three assists in a game, joining Ella Shelton, who first achieved the feat on January 14, 2024.

During the league's expansion to 12 teams ahead of the 2026–27 season, she was let unprotected by the Sirens and signed a two-year contract with the San Jose Sea Lions on June 8, 2026.

== International play ==
Wheeler represented Canada at the 2019 and 2020 U18 World Champion, winning a gold and silver medal while scoring a total of nine points in ten games. While playing with a groin injury, she scored the game-winning overtime goal in the 2019 gold medal game against the United States, winning Canada's first gold medal in the tournament since 2014. In 2020, Wheeler was an assistant captain helping the team secure a silver medal.

== Personal life ==
Wheeler lists Marie-Philip Poulin and Serena Williams as her favorite female athletes.

== Career statistics ==
=== Regular season and playoffs ===
			Regular season					Playoffs
Season	Team	League	GP	G	A	Pts	PIM	GP	G	A	Pts	PIM
2020-21	Wisconsin Badgers	WCHA	20	2	2	4	4	—	—	—	—	—
2021-22	Wisconsin Badgers	WCHA	36	12	14	26	28	—	—	—	—	—
2022-23	Wisconsin Badgers	WCHA	41	98	19	28	20	—	—	—	—	—
2023-24	Wisconsin Badgers	WCHA	39	10	14	24	28	—	—	—	—	—
2024-25	Ohio State Buckeyes	WCHA	34	7	13	20	28	—	—	—	—	—
2025-26	New York Sirens	PWHL	29	3	7	10	24	-	-	-	-	-
PWHL totals			29	3	7	10	24	—	—	—	—	—

=== International ===
Year	Team	Event	Result	GP	G	A	Pts	PIM
2019	Canada	U18	1st place, gold medalist(s)	5	1	5	6	2
2020	Canada	U18	2nd place, silver medalist(s)	5	1	2	3	0
Totals				5	1	2	3	6

== Transactions ==
- June 24, 2025 – Drafted by the New York Sirens (PWHL) in the PWHL Draft.
- June 8, 2026 - Signed with expansion team San Jose Sea Lions in Phase 2 of the expansion process.
