= 2022–23 NCAA Division I women's ice hockey rankings =

Women's ice hockey rankings

- NCAA tournament: 2023
- Preseason No. 1 (USA Today): Ohio State
- Preseason No. 1 (USCHO): Ohio State
- NCAA Division I women's ice hockey rankings

Two polls made up the 2022–23 NCAA Division I women's ice hockey rankings, the USCHO.com poll and the USA Today/USA Hockey Magazine poll. As the 2022–23 season progresses, rankings were updated weekly.

== Legend ==
	Increase in ranking
	Decrease in ranking
	Not ranked previous week
Italics	Number of first place votes
(#-#)	Win–loss–tie record
т	Tied with team above or below also with this symbol

== USCHO ==
	Preseason Sep 12	Week 1 Sep 26	Week 2 Oct 3	Week 3 Oct 10	Week 4 Oct 17	Week 5 Oct 24	Week 6 Oct 31	Week 7 Nov 7	Week 8 Nov 14	Week 9 Nov 21	Week 10 Nov 28	Week 11 Dec 5	Week 12 Dec 12	Week 13 Jan 9	Week 14 Jan 16	Week 15 Jan 23	Week 16 Jan 30	Week 17 Feb 6	Week 18 Feb 13	Week 19 Feb 20	Week 20 Feb 27	Week 21 Mar 6	Final Mar 20	
1.	Ohio State (17)	Ohio State (0–0–0) (18)	Ohio State (2–0–0) (17)	Ohio State (4–0–0) (18)	Ohio State (6–0–0) (18)	Ohio State (8–0–0) (20)	Minnesota (7–0–1) (18)	Minnesota (9–0–1) (20)	Minnesota (9–1–1) (10)	Ohio State (12–1–1) (12)	Ohio State (13–1–2) (14)	Ohio State (14–2–2) (9)	Ohio State (14–2–2) (13)	Ohio State (18–2–2) (20)	Ohio State (20–2–2) (20)	Ohio State (22–2–2) (17)	Ohio State (24–2–2) (14)	Ohio State (25–3–2) (10)	Ohio State (27–3–2) (19)	Ohio State (28–4–2) (16)	Ohio State (30–4–2) (17)	Ohio State (31–5–2) (12)	Wisconsin (29–10–0) (20)	1.
2.	Minnesota (2)	Minnesota (0–0–0) (1)	Minnesota (0–0–0) (2)	Minnesota (2–0–0) (1)	Minnesota (4–0–0) (2)	Minnesota (6–0–0)	Ohio State (8–1–1) (1)	Ohio State (10–1–1)	Ohio State (10–1–1) (7)	Wisconsin (11–2–1) (5)	Wisconsin (11–2–1) (3)	Wisconsin (13–2–1) (7)	Wisconsin (15–2–1) (6)	Yale (14–1–1)	Yale (17–1–1)	Yale (19–1–1) (3)	Yale (21–1–1) (6)	Yale (23–1–1) (10)	Yale (24–2–1) (1)	Yale (26–2–1) (4)	Yale (28–2–1) (3)	Minnesota (29–5–3) (8)	Ohio State (33–6–2)	2.
3.	Wisconsin (1)	Northeastern (0–0–0) (1)	Northeastern (2–0–0) (1)	Northeastern (4–0–0) (1)	Northeastern (6–0–0)	Wisconsin (9–1–0)	Wisconsin (10–2–0)	Wisconsin (10–2–0)	Wisconsin (10–2–0) (1)	Minnesota (9–2–2) (1)	Yale (8–0–0) (3)	Quinnipiac (16–1–0) (4)	Yale (10–1–1) (1)	Minnesota (16–3–2)	Minnesota (18–3–2)	Minnesota (20–3–2)	Minnesota (22–3–2)	Minnesota (23–4–2)	Colgate (26–4–2)	Colgate (26–4–2)	Minnesota (27–5–3)	Colgate (32–5–2)	Minnesota (30–6–3)	3.
4.	Northeastern	Minnesota Duluth (2–0–0)	Minnesota Duluth (4–0–0)	Minnesota Duluth (6–0–0)	Minnesota Duluth (6–0–0)	Colgate (9–0–0)	Quinnipiac (9–0–0) (1)	Colgate (11–1–0)	Colgate (13–1–0)	Quinnipiac (12–1–0)	Quinnipiac (14–1–0)	Yale (8–1–1)	Quinnipiac (17–2–0)	Quinnipiac (20–3–0)	Quinnipiac (22–3–0)	Quinnipiac (23–4–0)	Colgate (22–4–1)	Colgate (24–4–2)	Minnesota (23–5–3)	Minnesota (25–5–3)	Colgate (30–5–2)	Yale (28–3–1)	Northeastern (34–3–1)	4.
5.	Minnesota Duluth	Wisconsin (1–1–0)	Wisconsin (3–1–0)	Wisconsin (5–1–0)	Wisconsin (7–1–0)	Minnesota Duluth (6–2–0)	Minnesota Duluth (7–3–0)	Quinnipiac (10–1–0)	Quinnipiac (10–1–0)	Yale (6–0–0) (2)	Minnesota (10–3–2)	Colgate (15–2–1)	Minnesota (14–3–2)	Colgate (17–2–1)	Colgate (19–3–1)	Colgate (20–4–1)	Northeastern (24–2–1)	Northeastern (25–2–1)	Northeastern (27–2–1)	Northeastern (30–2–1)	Northeastern (31–2–1)	Northeastern (33–2–1)	Colgate (32–6–2)	5.
6.	Colgate	Colgate (1–0–0)	Colgate (3–0–0)	Colgate (5–0–0)	Colgate (7–0–0)	Northeastern (7–1–0)	Colgate (10–1–0)	Yale (4–0–0)	Yale (4–0–0) (2)	Colgate (13–1–0)	Colgate (13–2–1)	Minnesota (12–3–2)	Colgate (15–2–1)	Minnesota Duluth (15–6–1)	Minnesota Duluth (17–6–1)	Minnesota Duluth (19–6–1)	Quinnipiac (24–5–0)	Quinnipiac (25–5–0)	Wisconsin (22–8–2)	Wisconsin (23–9–2)	Wisconsin (25–9–2)	Wisconsin (25–10–2)	Yale (28–4–1)	6.
7.	Yale	Yale (0–0–0)	Quinnipiac (4–0–0)	Quinnipiac (6–0–0)	Quinnipiac (7–0–0)	Quinnipiac (7–0–0)	Northeastern (8–1–1)	Minnesota Duluth (7–5–0)	Minnesota Duluth (9–5–0)	Minnesota Duluth (11–5–0)	Northeastern (16–2–1)	Minnesota Duluth (12–6–0)	Northeastern (18–2–1)	Northeastern (19–2–1)	Northeastern (21–2–1)	Northeastern (23–2–1)	Minnesota Duluth (19–8–1)	Minnesota Duluth (20–8–2)	Quinnipiac (27–5–0)	Minnesota Duluth (23–8–3)	Minnesota Duluth (25–8–3)	Minnesota Duluth (25–9–3)	Minnesota Duluth (26–10–3)	7.
8.	Quinnipiac	Quinnipiac (2–0–0)	Yale (0–0–0)	Yale (0–0–0)	Yale (0–0–0)	Cornell (2–0–0)	Yale (2–0–0)	Northeastern (10–1–1)	Northeastern (12–1–1)	Northeastern (14–2–1)	Minnesota Duluth (11–5–0)	Northeastern (18–2–1)	Minnesota Duluth (13–6–1)	Wisconsin (16–5–1)	Wisconsin (16–7–1)	Wisconsin (18–7–1)	Wisconsin (20–7–1)	Wisconsin (21–8–1)	Minnesota Duluth (21–8–3)	Quinnipiac (27–7–0)	Quinnipiac (29–8–0)	Quinnipiac (29–9–0)	Quinnipiac (30–10–0)	8.
9.	Clarkson	Princeton (0–0–0)	Princeton (0–0–0)	Princeton (0–0–0)	Princeton (0–0–0)	Yale (0–0–0)	Cornell (3–1–0)	Cornell (5–1–0)	Cornell (6–2–0)	Cornell (6–2–0)	Providence (13–4–1)	Cornell (7–3–2)	Providence (16–5–1)	Cornell (9–5–2)	Clarkson (19–6–1)	Clarkson (20–6–2)	Clarkson (21–7–2)	Clarkson (22–8–2)	Clarkson (24–8–2)	Clarkson (26–8–2)	Clarkson (28–9–2)	Clarkson (29–10–2)	Clarkson (29–11–2)	9.
10.	Princeton	Clarkson (2–0–0)	Clarkson (3–0–1)	Cornell (0–0–0)	Cornell (0–0–0)	Clarkson (8–1–1) т	Clarkson (10–1–1)	Providence (9–2–1)	Clarkson (12–3–1)	Clarkson (13–4–1)	Cornell (6–3–1)	Providence (15–4–1)	Cornell (7–3–2)	Clarkson (17–6–1)	Cornell (10–6–2)	Cornell (12–7–2)	Penn State (20–8–2)	Penn State (22–8–2)	Penn State (22–8–2)	Penn State (24–8–2)	Penn State (26–8–2)	Penn State (27–8–2)	Penn State (27–9–2)	10.
11.	Harvard	Penn State (1–1–0)	Penn State (2–2–0)	Clarkson (4–1–1) т	Clarkson (6–1–1)	Princeton (0–0–0) т	Penn State (7–4–1)	Clarkson (10–3–1)	Penn State (9–5–1)	Providence (12–4–1)	Clarkson (14–5–1)	Clarkson (16–5–1)	Clarkson (16–5–1)	Vermont (15–7–1)	Vermont (16–8–1)	Vermont (17–9–1)	Vermont (18–10–1)	Vermont (19–10–1)	Vermont (20–10–2)	Vermont (21–10–3)	Vermont (22–10–3)	Vermont (22–11–3)	Vermont (22–11–3)	11.
12.	Cornell	Cornell (0–0–0) т	Cornell (0–0–0)	Penn State (2–4–0) т	Penn State (3–4–1)	Penn State (4–4–1)	Providence (7–2–1)	Penn State (8–5–1)	Connecticut (10–4–2)	Penn State (10–7–1) т	Penn State (11–8–1)	Penn State (13–8–1)	Penn State (13–8–1)	Penn State (15–8–1)	Penn State (16–8–2)	Penn State (17–8–2)	Providence (18–8–4)	St. Cloud State (16–15–0)	St. Cloud State (16–16–1)	St. Cloud State (18–16–1)	St. Cloud State (18–18–1)	Providence (22–11–4)	St. Cloud State (18–18–1)	12.
13.	Vermont	Harvard (0–0–0) т	Harvard (0–0–0)	Harvard (0–0–0)	Providence (5–1–0)	Providence (7–1–0)	Vermont (5–4–1)	Vermont (7–4–1)	Providence (9–4–1)	Vermont (10–5–1) т	Vermont (10–5–1)	Vermont (11–7–1)	Vermont (13–7–1)	Providence (16–7–1)	Providence (17–8–1)	Providence (17–8–3)	Cornell (12–9–2)	Providence (18–9–4)	Providence (19–9–4)	Cornell (15–12–2)	Cornell (16–14–2)	St. Cloud State (18–18–1)	Providence (22–11–4)	13.
14.	Penn State	Vermont (0–0–0)	Vermont (2–0–0)	Boston College (3–1–0)	Vermont (4–1–1)	Vermont (4–3–1)	Princeton (0–2–0)	Connecticut (8–4–2)	Vermont (8–5–1)	Princeton (4–4–0)	Connecticut (11–7–2)	St. Cloud State (11–8–0)	Connecticut (12–8–2)	St. Cloud State (13–10–0)	Connecticut (15–8–2)	Connecticut (16–8–3)	St. Cloud State (15–14–0)	Cornell (12–11–2)	Cornell (13–12–2)	Providence (20–10–4)	Providence (21–10–4)	Cornell (16–14–2)	Cornell (16–14–2)	14.
15.	Boston College	Boston College (1–0–0)	Connecticut (4–0–0)	Providence (3–1–0)	Harvard (0–1–0)	Boston College (5–2–0)	Boston College (6–3–1)	Princeton (1–3–0)	Princeton (3–3–0)	Connecticut (10–6–2)	Princeton (4–5–1)	Connecticut (12–8–2)	St. Cloud State (11–10–0)	Connecticut (13–8–2)	Boston College (14–8–1)	St. Cloud State (13–14–0)	Connecticut (16–10–3)	Connecticut (16–10–4)	Boston College (18–12–1)	Boston College (19–14–1)	Boston College (20–14–1)	Boston College (20–15–1)	Boston College (20–15–1)	15.
	Preseason Sep 12	Week 1 Sep 26	Week 2 Oct 3	Week 3 Oct 10	Week 4 Oct 17	Week 5 Oct 24	Week 6 Oct 31	Week 7 Nov 7	Week 8 Nov 14	Week 9 Nov 21	Week 10 Nov 28	Week 11 Dec 5	Week 12 Dec 12	Week 13 Jan 9	Week 14 Jan 16	Week 15 Jan 23	Week 16 Jan 30	Week 17 Feb 6	Week 18 Feb 13	Week 19 Feb 20	Week 20 Feb 27	Week 21 Mar 6	Final Mar 20	
		None	Dropped: Boston College	Dropped: Vermont; Connecticut	Dropped: Boston College	Dropped: Harvard	None	Dropped: Boston College	None	None	None	Dropped: Princeton	None	None	Dropped: St. Cloud State	Dropped: Boston College	None	None	Dropped: Connecticut	None	None	None	None	

== USA Today ==
	Preseason Sep 13	Week 1 Sep 20	Week 2 Sep 27	Week 3 Oct 4	Week 4 Oct 11	Week 5 Oct 18	Week 6 Oct 25	Week 7 Nov 1	Week 8 Nov 8	Week 9 Nov 15	Week 10 Nov 22	Week 11 Nov 29	Week 12 Dec 6	Week 13 Dec 13	Week 14 Dec 20	Week 15 Jan 10	Week 16 Jan 17	Week 17 Jan 24	Week 18 Jan 31	Week 19 Feb 7	Week 20 Feb 14	Week 21 Feb 21	Week 22 Feb 28	Week 23 Mar 7	Week 24 Mar 14	Final Mar 21	
1.	Ohio State (16)	Ohio State (0–0–0) (18)	Ohio State (0–0–0) (19)	Ohio State (2–0–0) (17)	Ohio State (4–0–0) (19)	Ohio State (6–0–0) (17)	Ohio State (8–0–0) (19)	Minnesota (7–0–1) (17)	Minnesota (9–1–1) (18)	Ohio State (10–1–1) (10)	Ohio State (12–1–1) (13)	Ohio State (13–1–2) (11)	Ohio State (14–2–2) (5)	Ohio State (14–2–2) (9)	Ohio State (16–2–2) (15)	Ohio State (18–2–2) (18)	Ohio State (20–2–2) (18)	Ohio State (22–2–2) (15)	Ohio State (24–2–2) (13)	Yale (23–1–1) (11)	Ohio State (27–3–2) (16)	Ohio State (28–4–2) (13)	Ohio State (30–4–2) (14)	Ohio State (31–5–2) (15)	Ohio State (32–5–2) (17)	Wisconsin (29–10–2) (19)	1.
2.	Wisconsin (3)	Wisconsin (0–0–0) (1)	Minnesota (0–0–0)	Minnesota (0–0–0) (2)	Minnesota (2–0–0)	Minnesota (4–0–0) (2)	Minnesota (6–0–0)	Ohio State (8–1–1) (1)	Ohio State (10–1–1) (1)	Minnesota (9–1–1) (5)	Wisconsin (11–2–1) (4)	Wisconsin (11–2–1) (4)	Wisconsin (13–2–1) (10)	Wisconsin (15–2–1) (8)	Wisconsin (15–2–1) (3)	Quinnipiac (20–3–0)	Yale (17–1–1)	Yale (19–1–1) (3)	Yale (21–1–1) (5)	Ohio State (25–3–2) (7)	Yale (24–2–1) (2)	Yale (26–2–1) (6)	Yale (28–2–1) (4)	Minnesota (29–5–3) (3)	Minnesota (30–5–3) (1)	Ohio State (33–6–2)	2.
3.	Minnesota	Minnesota (0–0–0)	Northeastern (0–0–0)	Northeastern (2–0–0)	Northeastern (4–0–0)	Northeastern (6–0–0)	Wisconsin (9–1–0)	Wisconsin (10–2–0)	Wisconsin (10–2–0)	Wisconsin (10–2–0) (1)	Minnesota (9–2–2)	Yale (8–0–0) (3)	Quinnipiac (16–1–0)	Quinnipiac (17–2–0)	Yale (10–1–1) (1)	Yale (14–1–1)	Quinnipiac (22–3–0)	Minnesota (20–3–2) (1)	Minnesota (22–3–2) (1)	Minnesota (23–4–2)	Colgate (26–4–2)	Colgate (28–4–2)	Minnesota (27–5–3)	Colgate (32–5–2)	Northeastern (34–2–1) (1)	Minnesota (30–6–3)	3.
4.	Northeastern	Northeastern (0–0–0)	Wisconsin (1–1–0)	Wisconsin (3–1–0)	Wisconsin (5–1–0)	Wisconsin (7–1–0)	Colgate (9–0–0)	Quinnipiac (9–0–0) (1)	Quinnipiac (10–1–0)	Colgate (13–1–0)	Quinnipiac (12–1–0)	Quinnipiac (14–1–0)	Minnesota (12–3–2)	Yale (10–1–1) (1)	Quinnipiac (17–2–0)	Minnesota (16–3–2) (1)	Minnesota (18–3–2) (1)	Quinnipiac (23–4–0)	Colgate (22–4–1)	Colgate (24–4–2)	Minnesota (23–5–3)	Minnesota (25–5–3)	Colgate (30–5–2)	Yale (28–3–1)	Wisconsin (27–10–2)	Northeastern (34–3–1)	4.
5.	Minnesota Duluth	Minnesota Duluth (0–0–0)	Minnesota Duluth (2–0–0)	Minnesota Duluth (4–0–0)	Minnesota Duluth (6–0–0)	Minnesota Duluth (6–0–0)	Northeastern (7–1–0)	Minnesota Duluth (7–3–0)	Colgate (11–1–0)	Quinnipiac (10–1–0)	Yale (6–0–0) (2)	Minnesota (10–3–2)	Yale (8–1–1)	Minnesota (14–3–2)	Minnesota (14–3–2)	Colgate (17–2–1) т	Colgate (19–3–1)	Colgate (20–4–1)	Northeastern (24–2–1)	Northeastern (25–2–1) (1)	Northeastern (27–2–1) (1)	Northeastern (30–2–1)	Northeastern (31–2–1) (1)	Northeastern (33–2–1) (1)	Colgate (32–6–2)	Colgate (32–6–2)	5.
6.	Yale	Colgate (0–0–0)	Colgate (1–0–0)	Colgate (3–0–0)	Colgate (5–0–0)	Colgate (7–0–0)	Minnesota Duluth (6–2–0)	Colgate (10–1–0)	Yale (4–0–0)	Yale (4–0–0) (2)	Colgate (13–1–0)	Colgate (13–2–1)	Colgate (15–2–1)	Colgate (15–2–1)	Colgate (15–2–1)	Wisconsin (16–5–1) т	Minnesota Duluth (17–6–1)	Minnesota Duluth (19–6–1)	Quinnipiac (24–5–0)	Quinnipiac (25–5–0)	Quinnipiac (27–5–0)	Wisconsin (23–9–2)	Wisconsin (25–9–2)	Wisconsin (25–10–2)	Yale (28–4–1)	Yale (28–4–1)	6.
7.	Colgate	Yale (0–0–0)	Quinnipiac (2–0–0)	Quinnipiac (4–0–0)	Quinnipiac (6–0–0)	Quinnipiac (7–0–0)	Quinnipiac (7–0–0)	Northeastern (8–1–1)	Northeastern (10–1–1)	Northeastern (12–1–1) (1)	Minnesota Duluth (11–5–0)	Northeastern (16–2–1) (1)	Northeastern (18–2–1) (1)	Northeastern (18–2–1)	Northeastern (18–2–1)	Minnesota Duluth (15–6–1)	Northeastern (21–2–1)	Northeastern (23–2–1)	Minnesota Duluth (19–8–1)	Minnesota Duluth (20–8–2)	Wisconsin (22–8–2)	Minnesota Duluth (23–8–3)	Minnesota Duluth (25–8–3)	Minnesota Duluth (25–9–3)	Minnesota Duluth (26–10–3)	Minnesota Duluth (26–10–3)	7.
8.	Quinnipiac	Quinnipiac (0–0–0)	Yale (0–0–0)	Yale (0–0–0)	Yale (0–0–0)	Yale (0–0–0)	Yale (0–0–0)	Yale (2–0–0)	Minnesota Duluth (7–5–0)	Minnesota Duluth (9–5–0)	Northeastern (14–2–1)	Minnesota Duluth (11–5–0)	Minnesota Duluth (12–6–0)	Minnesota Duluth (13–6–1)	Minnesota Duluth (13–6–1)	Northeastern (19–2–1)	Wisconsin (16–7–1)	Wisconsin (18–7–1)	Wisconsin (20–7–1)	Wisconsin (21–8–1)	Minnesota Duluth (21–8–3)	Quinnipiac (27–7–0)	Quinnipiac (29–8–0)	Quinnipiac (29–9–0)	Quinnipiac (30–10–0)	Quinnipiac (30–10–0)	8.
9.	Clarkson	Princeton (0–0–0)	Princeton (0–0–0)	Princeton (0–0–0)	Princeton (0–0–0)	Princeton (0–0–0)	Cornell (2–0–0)	Cornell (3–1–0)	Cornell (5–1–0)	Cornell (6–2–0)	Cornell (6–2–0)	Providence (13–4–1)	Providence (15–4–1)	Providence (16–5–1)	Providence (16–5–1)	Cornell (9–5–2)	Cornell (10–6–2)	Cornell (12–7–2)	Clarkson (21–7–2)	Penn State (22–8–2)	Penn State (22–8–2)	Clarkson (26–8–2)	Clarkson (28–9–2)	Clarkson (29–10–2)	Clarkson (29–11–2)	Clarkson (29–11–2)	9.
10.	Harvard	Clarkson (0–0–0)	Clarkson (2–0–0)	Clarkson (3–0–1)	Cornell (0–0–0)	Cornell (0–0–0)	Princeton (0–0–0)	Clarkson (10–1–1)	Providence (9–2–1)	Clarkson (12–3–1)	Clarkson (13–4–1)	Cornell (6–3–1)	Cornell (7–3–2)	Cornell (7–3–2)	Cornell (7–5–2)	Clarkson (17–6–1)	Clarkson (19–6–1)	Clarkson (20–6–2)	Penn State (20–8–2)	Clarkson (22–8–2)	Clarkson (24–8–2)	Penn State (24–8–2)	Penn State (26–8–2)	Penn State (27–8–2)	Penn State (27–9–2)	Penn State (27–9–2)	10.
11.	Princeton	Cornell (0–0–0)	Penn State (1–1–0)	Cornell (0–0–0)	Clarkson (4–1–1)	Clarkson (6–1–1)	Clarkson (8–1–1)	Penn State (7–4–1)	Clarkson (9–2–1)	Penn State (10–5–1)	Providence (12–4–1)	Clarkson (14–5–1)	Clarkson (16–5–1)	Clarkson (16–5–1)	Clarkson (16–5–1)	Penn State (15–8–1)	Penn State (16–8–2)	Penn State (17–8–2)	Providence (18–8–4)	Vermont (19–10–1)	Vermont (20–10–2)	Vermont (21–10–3)	Vermont (22–10–3)	Vermont (22–11–3)	Providence (22–11–4)	Vermont (22–11–3)	11.
12.	Cornell	Harvard (0–0–0)	Cornell (0–0–0)	Penn State (2–2–0)	Harvard (0–0–0)	Penn State (3–4–1)	Penn State (4–4–1)	Providence (7–2–1)	Penn State (8–5–1)	Connecticut (10–4–1)	Penn State (10–7–1)	Penn State (11–8–1)	Penn State (13–8–1)	Penn State (13–8–1)	Penn State (13–8–1)	Vermont (15–7–1)	Vermont (16–8–1)	Vermont (17–9–1)	Cornell (12–9–2)	St. Cloud State (16–15–0)	St. Cloud State (16–16–1)	St. Cloud State (18–16–1)	St. Cloud State (18–18–1)	Providence (22–11–4)	Vermont (22–11–3)	Providence (22–11–4)	12.
13.	Boston College	Vermont (0–0–0)	Harvard (0–0–0)	Harvard (0–0–0)	Penn State (2–4–0)	Providence (5–1–0)	Providence (7–1–0)	Princeton (0–2–0)	Vermont (7–4–1)	Providence (9–4–1)	Vermont (10–5–1)	Vermont (10–5–1)	Vermont (11–7–1)	Vermont (13–7–1)	Vermont (13–7–1)	Providence (16–7–1)	Providence (17–8–1)	Providence (17–8–3)	Vermont (18–10–1)	Providence (18–9–4)	Providence (19–9–4)	Cornell (15–12–2)	Cornell (16–14–2)	St. Cloud State (18–18–1)	St. Cloud State (18–18–1)	St. Cloud State (18–18–1)	13.
14.	Connecticut т	Boston College (0–0–0) т	Boston College (1–0–0)	Vermont (2–0–0)	Connecticut (4–2–0)	Harvard (0–1–0)	Vermont (4–3–1)	Vermont (5–4–1)	Connecticut (9–1–1)	Vermont (8–5–1)	Princeton (4–4–0)	Connecticut (11–7–2)	St. Cloud State (11–8–0)	Connecticut (12–8–2)	St. Cloud State (11–10–0)	St. Cloud State (13–10–0)	Connecticut (15–8–2)	Connecticut (16–8–3)	St. Cloud State (15–14–0)	Cornell (12–11–2)	Cornell (13–12–2)	Providence (20–10–4)	Providence (21–10–4)	Cornell (16–14–2)	Cornell (16–14–2)	Cornell (16–14–2)	14.
15.	Vermont т	Penn State (0–0–0) т	Vermont (0–0–0)	Connecticut (4–0–0)	Boston College (3–1–0) т Vermont (3–1–0) т	Vermont (4–1–1)	Boston College (5–2–1)	Boston College (6–3–1)	Princeton (1–3–0)	Princeton (3–3–0)	Connecticut (10–6–2)	Princeton (4–5–1)	Connecticut (12–8–2)	St. Cloud State (11–10–0)	Connecticut (12–8–2)	Connecticut (13–8–2)	Boston College (14–8–1)	St. Cloud State (13–14–0)	Connecticut (16–10–3)	Connecticut (16–10–4)	Minnesota State (15–16–1)	Boston College (19–14–1)	Boston College (20–14–1)	Boston College (20–15–1)	Boston College (20–15–1)	Boston College (20–15–1)	15.
	Preseason Sep 13	Week 1 Sep 20	Week 2 Sep 27	Week 3 Oct 4	Week 4 Oct 11	Week 5 Oct 18	Week 6 Oct 25	Week 7 Nov 1	Week 8 Nov 8	Week 9 Nov 15	Week 10 Nov 22	Week 11 Nov 29	Week 12 Dec 6	Week 13 Dec 13	Week 14 Dec 20	Week 15 Jan 10	Week 16 Jan 17	Week 17 Jan 24	Week 18 Jan 31	Week 19 Feb 7	Week 20 Feb 14	Week 21 Feb 21	Week 22 Feb 28	Week 23 Mar 7	Week 24 Mar 14	Final Mar 21	
		Dropped: Connecticut	None	Dropped: Boston College	None	Dropped: Boston College	Dropped: Harvard	None	Dropped: Boston College	None	None	None	Dropped: Princeton	None	None	None	Dropped: St. Cloud State	Dropped: Boston College	None	None	Dropped: Connecticut	Dropped: Minnesota State	None	None	None	None	
