= Abby Boreen =

American ice hockey player (born 2000)

Abigail Boreen
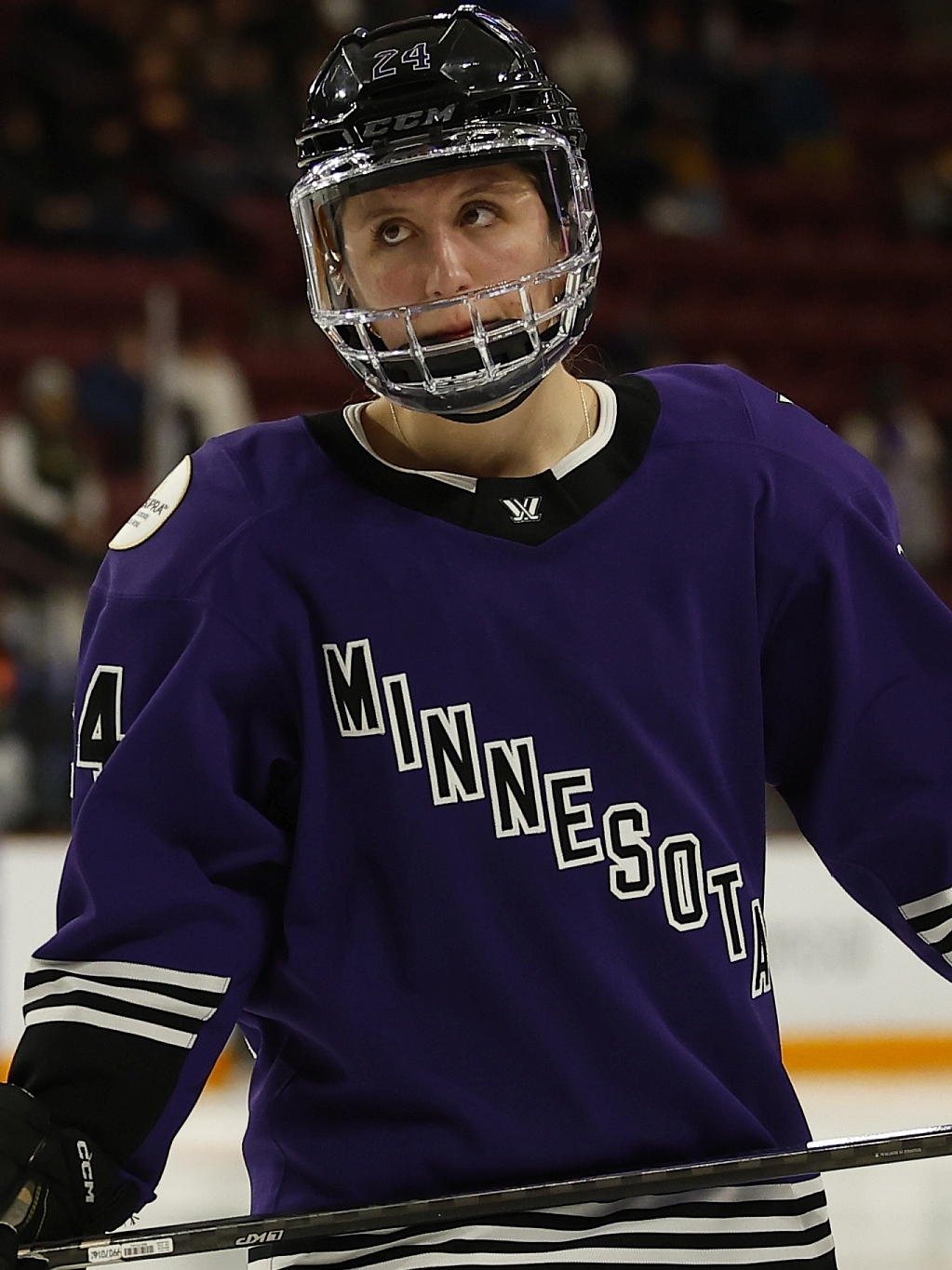
- Boreen with PWHL Minnesota in 2024
- Born: April 3, 2000 (age 26) Saint Paul, Minnesota, U.S.
- Height: 5 ft 8 in (173 cm)
- Weight: 159 lb (72 kg; 11 st 5 lb)
- Position: Forward
- Shoots: Right
- PWHL team Former teams: Vancouver Goldeneyes; PWHL Minnesota; Montréal Victoire
- National team: United States
- Playing career: 2023–present

Abigail Boreen (born April 3, 2000) is an American ice hockey forward for Vancouver Goldeneyes of the Professional Women's Hockey League (PWHL). She previously played for PWHL Minnesota and the Montréal Victoire of the PWHL. She played college ice hockey for the University of Minnesota.

== Early life ==
Abigail Boreen is one of three children of Alicia and Chad Boreen. Her parents had a lake and rink, and at four years old, she learned to skate.

She attended high school at Hill-Murray School where she was a varsity ice hockey and soccer athlete at Hill-Murray, lettering in ice hockey for five years. She ranks first all-time in assists, third in points, and fourth in goals, with the Hill-Murray Pioneers.

She won her first Wisconsin state championship with the U-10 Western Wisconsin Stars. With the Hill-Murray Pioneers, she won back-to-back "AA" Minnesota state championship in 2014 and 2015 on the U14 and U16 team. In her junior year, the team finished third and Boreen was named the 2017 East Metro female Player of the Year. She was named captain of the Pioneers in her senior year and the team would finish 4 place in the state championship.

She also played club hockey with OS Hockey, the Minnesota Junior Whitecaps, and the Minnesota Girls Elite League.

Boreen received a scholarship offer from the University of Minnesota and committed to the school in April 2016. Her father Chad, also played for the Minnesota Golden Gophers men's hockey team.

== Playing career ==
=== College ===
Boreen made her debut with the Minnesota Golden Gophers for the 2018–19 season on September 29, 2018 with a 5–0 win against Mercyhurst Lakers. She had two shots on goal but did not register a point. On November 18, 2018, she scored her first goal against St. Cloud State Huskies. She finished the season with 9 points (4 goals, 5 assists) in 34 games.

She scored her first multi-goal game as a junior against Minnesota State in the 2020–21. She would finish the season with 8 goals, a career high and tied for second on the team. She had a career high shooting percentage of 0.229.

She made an offensive breakout in her senior year, finishing with 59 points (25 goals and 34 assists) in 39 games. She had 17 multi-point games with a season high 5-point performance against the St. Cloud Huskies on February 11, 2022, contributing to all 5 goals in the 5-0 win against the Huskies. She finished the 2021–22 season on a 7 game point streak collecting 13 points. She was named WCHA Forward of the Week twice and to the All-WCHA Second Team and the WCHA All-Tournament Team

Boreen was named one of four captains alongside fifth-year skaters Taylor Heise, Grace Ostertag, and Grace Zumwinkle. She set a career high in shots for the season with 146, registering at least one shot in every game of the season.She was named to the All-WCHA Third Team for the 2022–23 season. She ended her career with the seventh most games played in program history (166 games).

Her academic achievements also earned recognition; she was named to the Academic All-Big Ten team in three seasons (2020, 2021, and 2022), to the WCHA All-Academic Team in three seasons (2021, 2022, and 2023), and as a WCHA Scholar-Athlete for the 2021 season. Her status as WCHA All-Academic in her fifth year was earned while she was enrolled in pharmacy school as a graduate student.

=== Professional ===
==== PWHL Minnesota ====
Boreen planned to put her pharmacy education on hold and signed a one-year contract with the Minnesota Whitecaps of the Premier Hockey Federation (PHF), reuniting her with former Gopher teammates Olivia Knowles and Catie Skaja. Following the buyout of the PHF, Boreen's contract was voided and she would never play a game for the Whitecaps.

Boreen declared for the 2023 PWHL Draft but was undrafted. She was invited to the PWHL Minnesota training camp. She signed with Minnesota as a reserve player while continuing to pursue her pharmacy degree as a full-time student at UMN College of Pharmacy. As a full-time student on the reserve roster, she would be eligible to sign a maximum of two 10-day Standard Player Agreements (SPA).

On January 24, 2024, Amanda Leveille was placed on LTIR and the team signed Boreen to a 10-day contract. She scored her first professional goal—an overtime winner—in her third game, and completed her 10-day contract having appeared in five games, scoring two goals and one assist. She signed a second 10 day contract on February 25, 2024 when Heise was placed on LTIR. She would play in an additional 4 games, scoring 2 goals. Minnesota again activated Boreen to the roster for Game 1 of the Walter Cup Semifinals as her reserve contract made her eligible for one playoff series. Minnesota would go on to win the inaugural Walter Cup beating PWHL Boston 3–0 in Game 5 of the finals.

==== Montréal Victoire ====
Since Boreen had only played under 10-day SPAs, she was eligible for the 2024 PWHL draft. She was widely expected to be picked by PWHL Minnesota given her success with the team. Despite having the opportunity, Minnesota declined to pick her in the first, second or third rounds, instead picking Claire Thompson, Britta Curl-Salemme and Klára Hymlárová with those picks, respectively. She was drafted in the third round, 17th overall, by PWHL Montreal; PWHL Minnesota fans in attendance booed loudly when Montreal announced their selection of Boreen. She signed a three-year contract with Montreal on October 18, 2024, who had by then rebranded to the Montreal Victoire.

Boreen had a goal and an assist in her debut with the Victoire and was named third start of the week in the opening weekend of the 2024-25 season. Boreen would spend parts of the season playing on the first line alongside Marie-Philip Poulin and Jennifer Gardiner and finished the regular season tied for third in goals with six.

==== Vancouver Goldeneyes ====
Boreen was not on the Victoire's protected list and as a result, she was drafted fifth overall by the Goldeneyes in the 2025 PWHL Expansion Draft on June 9, 2025. With Vancouver, she would be reunited with her Victoire linemate, Gardiner, who had signed with the team earlier in the exclusive signing window. On November 21, 2025, Boreen scored the Goldeneyes' first-ever game-winning goal, giving Vancouver a 4-3 overtime win over the Seattle Torrent.

On June 15, 2026, Boreen was selected by PWHL Las Vegas during Phase 4 of the PWHL's Expansion Player Distribution Process. However, two days later, she was traded back to Vancouver ahead of the 2026 PWHL Draft for two draft picks, 13th and 49th overall.

== International play ==
Boreen attended USA Hockey's Girls Select U18 Player Development Camp in 2016 and 2017, as well as participating in USA Hockey's 2016 and 2017 Women's National Festivals.

== Personal life ==
Boreen grew up shadowing pharmacists, helping to inspire her to the field. She balanced her professional hockey career while pursuing her degree. In May 2026, she graduated from the University of Minnesota with a Doctor of Pharmacy.

Boreen has stated that her hockey role model is Natalie Darwitz.

== Career statistics ==
Note: GP = Games played; G = Goals; A = Assists; Pts = Points; PIM = Penalty minutes;

			Regular season					Playoffs
Season	Team	League	GP	G	A	Pts	PIM	GP	G	A	Pts	PIM
2018–19	Minnesota Golden Gophers	WCHA	34	4	5	9	2	—	—	—	—	—
2019–20	Minnesota Golden Gophers	WCHA	36	2	8	10	10	—	—	—	—	—
2020–21	Minnesota Golden Gophers	WCHA	20	8	3	11	2	—	—	—	—	—
2021–22	Minnesota Golden Gophers	WCHA	39	25	34	59	30	—	—	—	—	—
2022–23	Minnesota Golden Gophers	WCHA	36	21	15	36	12	—	—	—	—	—
2023–24	PWHL Minnesota	PWHL	9	4	1	5	4	5	0	1	1	2
2024–25	Montreal Victoire	PWHL	30	6	8	14	12	4	0	0	0	0
2025–26	Vancouver Goldeneyes	PWHL	30	4	5	9	14	—	—	—	—	—
PWHL totals			69	14	14	28	30	9	0	1	1	2

== Awards and honours ==
Award	Year(s)	Ref.
WCHA
All WCHA All-Academic Team	2021	
All WCHA All-Academic Team	2022	
All-WCHA Second Team	2022	
WCHA All-Tournament Team	2022	
All WCHA All-Academic Team	2023	
PWHL
Walter Cup	2024	
