= 2021–22 ZhHL season =

7th season of the Zhenskaya Hockey League

- League: Zhenskaya Hockey League
- Sport: Ice hockey
- Duration: Regular season 22 September 2021– 30 March 2022; Playoffs; 6 April–26 April 2022
- Number of matches: 178
- Number of teams: 10
- TV partner(s): KHL TV; YouTube

Regular season
- Season champions: SKIF Nizhny Novgorod
- Top scorer: Anna Shokhina (Tornado)

Playoffs
- Playoffs MVP: Michela Cava (KRS)
- Finals champions: KRS Vanke Rays (2)
- Runners-up: SKIF Nizhny Novgorod

Seasons
- ← 2020–21 2022–23 →

The 2021–22 ZhHL season was the seventh season of the Zhenskaya Hockey League (ZhHL) since the league was established in 2015. It was the 27th season in which the women's ice hockey Russian Championship was contested. SKIF Nizhny Novgorod were the regular season champions after leading the league standings from November onwards.

The KRS Vanke Rays defeated SKIF Nizhny Novgorod in a sweep of the playoff finals to claim their second ZhHL Championship.

== Teams ==
Team	Location	Home venue	Head coach	Captain
Agidel	(Russia) Ufa	Ice Palace Salavat Yulaev	Denis Afinogenov	Maria Pechnikova
Belye Medveditsy	(Russia) Chelyabinsk	Yunost Sport Palace	Igor Znarok	Natalya Vorontsova
Biryusa	(Russia) Krasnoyarsk	Platinum Arena Krasnoyarsk	Alexander Vedernikov	Valeria Pavlova
Dinamo-Neva	(Russia) Saint Petersburg	Sports Palace "SPBGBU CFMC and VO"	Yevgeni Bobariko	Alyona Andryushchenko
~~Ice Wings~~^{†}	(Russia) Yaroslavl	GUOR Ice Hockey Arena	Artur Nadrgulov	
KRS Vanke Rays	(China) Shenzhen	Shenzhen Dayun Arena	Brian Idalski	Baiwei Yu
KRS Vanke Rays	(Russia) Mytishchi*	Mytishchi Arena*	Brian Idalski	Baiwei Yu
MSMO 7.62	(Russia) Voskresensk	Podmoskovie Ice Palace	Alexander Syrtsov	Alina Ichayeva
SKIF	(Russia) Nizhny Novgorod	Nagorny	Igor Averkin	Angelina Goncharenko
SKSO	(Russia) Yekaterinburg	Kurganovo Sports Complex/KRK Uralets	Sergei Chistyakov	Yekaterina Lebedeva
Tornado	(Russia) Dmitrov	Sports Complex Dmitrov	Alexei Chistyakov	Anna Shokhina

*Temporary relocation for 2021–22 season; ^{†}Team folded after 19 games played

== Standings ==
The regular season began on 22 September 2021 and concluded on 30 March 2022, with the eight most successful teams securing playoff berths.

Pos	Team	Pld	W	OTW	OTL	L	GF	GA	GD	Pts	Final Result
1	SKIF Nizhny Novgorod	36	28	3	1	4	149	45	+104	91	Playoff berth
2	KRS Vanke Rays	36	24	4	2	6	96	53	+43	82	Playoff berth
3	Agidel Ufa	36	24	3	3	6	171	60	+111	81	Playoff berth
4	Biryusa Krasnoyarsk	36	19	4	4	9	113	70	+43	69	Playoff berth
5	Tornado Dmitrov	36	20	2	4	10	143	93	+50	68	Playoff berth
6	Dinamo-Neva St. Petersburg	36	20	1	3	12	109	84	+25	65	Playoff berth
7	MSMO 7.62 Voskresensk	36	10	2	2	22	73	118	−45	36	Playoff berth
8	Belye Medveditsy Chelyabinsk	36	7	1	0	28	42	148	−106	23	Playoff berth
9	SKSO Yekaterinburg	36	6	1	1	28	58	158	−100	21	Did not qualify
10	Ice Wings Yaroslavl	36	1	0	1	34	20	145	−125	4	Did not qualify

Updated to match(es) played on 30 March 2022. Source: KHL

== Player statistics ==
=== Scoring leaders ===
The following skaters lead the league in points at the conclusion of games played on 30 March 2022.

	Player	Team	Pos.	GP	G	A	Pts	+/−	PIM
1	Anna Shokhina	Tornado	F	34	31	52	83	26	16
2	Yelena Dergachyova	Tornado	F	34	14	42	56	26	20
3	Valeria Pavlova	Biryusa	F	32	31	21	52	25	16
4	Olga Sosina	Agidel	F	32	25	26	51	41	18
5	Landysh Falyakhova	SKIF	F	36	14	35	49	41	14
6	Aneta Tejralová	SKIF	D	36	10	36	46	40	16
7	Nina Pirogova	Tornado	D	34	15	29	44	15	38
8	Alyona Starovoitova	SKIF	F	36	23	20	43	33	28
9	Polina Bolgareva	Dinamo-Neva	F	34	22	21	43	20	35
10	Nicol Lucák Čupková	Agidel	F	23	14	29	43	38	41

The following players were the top goal scorers of teams not represented in the top ten of the league, listed with their overall league rank:

- 29. Alexandra Nesterova (F), MSMO 7.62: 34 GP, 14 G, 11 A, 25 Pts, −10, 28 PIM
- #. Anna Timofeyeva (F), SKSO: 34 GP, 18 G, 5 A, 23 Pts, −21, 4 PIM
- #. Kassy Betinol (F), KRS Vanke Rays: 22 GP, 10 G, 11 A, 21 Pts, +17, 14 PIM
- #. Tatyana Shatalova (F), Belye Medveditsy: 19 GP, 7 G, 7 A, 14 Pts, −4, 12 PIM
- #. Mariya Lobur (F), Ice Wings: 18 GP, 4 G, 7 A, 11 Pts, –42, 14 PIM

=== Top goaltenders ===
The following goaltenders lead the league in save percentage at the conclusion of games played on 30 March 2022, while playing a minimum of 840 minutes.

	Player	Team	GP	TOI	W	L	SO	SV%	GAA
1	Valeria Tarakanova	SKIF	16	946:00	14	1	4	.954	1.14
2	Maria Sorokina	Agidel	21	1088:16	16	3	8	.943	1.27
3	Valeria Merkusheva	SKIF	19	1056:43	14	4	6	.935	1.53
4	Dariya Gredzen	Biryusa	27	1619:16	10	12	1	.924	2.30
5	Diana Farkhutdinova	Dinamo-Neva	29	1621:01	16	11	3	.924	2.15
6	Anna Prugova	Agidel	17	1020:56	9	5	2	.920	2.12
7	Milena Tretyak	Belye Medveditsy	28	1713:32	5	24	1	.909	4.03
8	Anna Alpatova	MSMO 7.62	33	1778:16	9	20	2	.907	3.21
9	Yulia Volkova	Tornado	32	1996:44	20	11	1	.901	2.61
10	Ravilya Ainullova	SKSO	18	898:54	4	10	0	.877	4.07

== Playoffs ==
The 2022 ZhHL playoffs began on 6 April. The KRS Vanke Rays claimed their second ZhHL Championship on 26 April after concluding a three game sweep of SKIF Nizhny Novgorod.

As of 26 April 2022

Quarterfinals
1	SKIF	2
8	Belye Medveditsy	0
5	Biryusa	1
4	Tornado	2
(Pairings are reseeded after the first round)
3	KRS Vanke Rays	2
6	MSMO 7.62	0
7	Agidel	1
2	Dinamo-Neva	2

Semifinals
1	SKIF	2
6	Dinamo-Neva	0
2	KRS Vanke Rays	2
5	Tornado	1

Finals
1st place, gold medalist(s)	KRS Vanke Rays	3
2nd place, silver medalist(s)	SKIF	0

=== Quarterfinals ===
All game times in Moscow Time (UTC+03:00) (1) SKIF vs. (8) Belye Medveditsy

6 April 2022; 16:30	Belye Medveditsy Chelyabinsk	0–2 (0–2, 0–0, 0–0)	SKIF Nizhny Novgorod	Yunost Sport Palace, Chelyabinsk; Attendance: 115

Game reference
Milena Tretyak	Goalies	Valeria Merkusheva	Referees: Yekaterina Kiselyova; Alina Polyakova; Linesmen: Oksana Vdovina; Diana Mokhova
0–1 / 14:21 – Starovoitova (Tejralová, Falyakhova); 0–2 / 17:28 – PP – Falyakhova (Tejralová, Kulishova)			Referees: Yekaterina Kiselyova; Alina Polyakova; Linesmen: Oksana Vdovina; Diana Mokhova
6 min	Penalties	4 min	Referees: Yekaterina Kiselyova; Alina Polyakova; Linesmen: Oksana Vdovina; Diana Mokhova
17	Shots	39	Referees: Yekaterina Kiselyova; Alina Polyakova; Linesmen: Oksana Vdovina; Diana Mokhova

9 April 2022; 11:15	SKIF Nizhny Novgorod	5–0 (1–0, 1–0, 3–0)	Belye Medveditsy Chelyabinsk	Konovalenko Sports Palace, Nizhny Novgorod; Attendance: 310

Game reference

Valeria Tarakanova
Goalies
Milena Tretyak
Referees:
Yekaterina Kiselyova
Alina Polyakova
Linesmen:
Oksana Vdovina
Diana Mokhova

Starovoitova (Tejralová) – SH – 10:50	1–0
Falyakhova (Starovoitova, Prokopenko) – 31:08	2–0
Ananyina – 52:02	3–0
Prokopenko (Ananyina) – 54:48	4–0
Garipova (Shmykova, Likhachyova) – 55:44	5–0

6 min
Penalties
2 min
44
Shots
16

(2) KRS Vanke Rays vs. (7) MSMO 7.62

6 April 2022; 17:00	MSMO 7.62 Voskresensk	0–7 (0–2, 0–2, 0–3)	KRS Vanke Rays Shenzhen	Podmoskovie Ice Palace, Voskresensk; Attendance: 64

Game reference

Anna Alpatova
Goalies
Noora Räty
Referees:
Elena Ivanova
Elizaveta Kolchina
Linesmen:
Anastasia Vasilyeva
Alina Moreva

0–1	01:30 – Karvinen
0–2	15:05 – Cava (Tapani, Nordin)
0–3	37:38 – PP – Tapani (Cava)
0–4	39:08 – Karvinen (Tapani, Cava)
0–5	46:19 – Kilponen (Fang, Nikolayeva)
0–6	57:15 – Houston (Mills)
0–7	59:08 – PP – Tapani (Nordin)

14 min
Penalties
10 min
8
Shots
33

9 April 2022; 14:00	KRS Vanke Rays Shenzhen	5–2 (1–0, 2–0, 2–2)	MSMO 7.62 Voskresensk	Mytishchi Arena, Mytishchi; Attendance: 65

Game reference

Noora Räty
Anastasia Ropotova
Goalies
Anna Alpatova
Sofya Larova
Referees:
Elizaveta Kolchina
Anastasiia Kurashova
Linesmen:
Viktoria Kozhevnikova
Margarita Kiseleva

Kilponen (Cava, Nordin) – SH – 08:43	1–0
Nordin (Karvinen, Cava) – 21:12	2–0
Nordin (Tapani, Cava) – 36:57	3–0
Pushkar (Houston) – 43:33	4–0
Nordin (Cava, Karvinen) – 43:59	5–0
	5–1	47:02 – Nuyaksheva (Ichayeva)
	5–2	56:57 – Shirshova

6 min
Penalties
12 min
49
Shots
12

(3) Agidel vs. (6) Dinamo-Neva

6 April 2022; 13:00	Dinamo-Neva St. Petersburg	0–3 (0–1, 0–1, 0–1)	Agidel Ufa	Yubileyny Sports Palace, St. Petersburg; Attendance: 125

Game reference

Diana Farkhutdinova
Goalies
Maria Sorokina
Referees:
Daria Abrosimova
Darya Ermak
Linesmen:
Alina Vlasova
Polina Danilova

0–1	18:29 – Markova (Tyurina)
0–2	38:16 – PP – Sosina
0–3	51:07 – Rodnova (Sosina)

8 min
Penalties
13 min
24
Shots
25

9 April 2022; 11:00	Agidel Ufa	0–2 (0–1, 0–1, 0–0)	Dinamo-Neva St. Petersburg	City Sports Palace, Ufa; Attendance: 355

Game reference
Anna Prugova	Goalies	Diana Farkhutdinova	Referees: Daria Abrosimova; Darya Ermak; Linesmen: Landysh Nurgalieva; Aryna Orishchenko
0–1 / 06:25 – Beloglazova (Ganeyeva, Kadirova); 0–2 / 26:37 – Prokopenko (Vafina)			Referees: Daria Abrosimova; Darya Ermak; Linesmen: Landysh Nurgalieva; Aryna Orishchenko
8 min	Penalties	4 min	Referees: Daria Abrosimova; Darya Ermak; Linesmen: Landysh Nurgalieva; Aryna Orishchenko
32	Shots	34	Referees: Daria Abrosimova; Darya Ermak; Linesmen: Landysh Nurgalieva; Aryna Orishchenko

10 April 2022; 13:00	Agidel Ufa	3–4 GWS (0–0, 1–1, 2–2) (OT: 0–0) (SO: 0–1)	Dinamo-Neva St. Petersburg	City Sports Palace, Ufa; Attendance: 320

Game reference

Maria Sorokina
Goalies
Diana Farkhutdinova
Referees:
Daria Abrosimova
Darya Ermak
Linesmen:
Landysh Nurgalieva
Aryna Orishchenko

	0–1	22:40 – Alexandrova (Bulatova)
Sosina (Korzhakova, Batalova) – 32:00	1–1
	1–2	47:00 – Kadirova (Vafina, Smirnova)
Batalova (Sosina) – PP – 49:48	2–2
Rodnova (Shibanova) – 54:01	3–2
	3–3	58:01 – Vafina (Kadirova, Nikolayeva)

Shibanova (miss)
Markova
Mitrofanova (miss)
Batalova (miss)
Shootout
(miss) Beloglazova
Bolgareva
Bulatova
Vafina
12 min
Penalties
8 min
46
Shots
25

(4) Biryusa vs. (5) Tornado

6 April 2022; 17:00	Tornado Moscow Oblast	4–1 (0–0, 1–0, 3–1)	Biryusa Krasnoyarsk	SC Dmitrov, Dmitrov; Attendance: 748

Game reference

Yulia Volkova
Goalies
Darya Gredzen
Referees:
Yana Zueva
Arina Ustinova
Linesmen:
Yulia Lavelina
Anastasia Letovaltseva

Davletshina (Arkhipova, Malyavko) – 32:34	1–0
Shokhina (Dergachyova) – 40:55	2–0
	2–1	42:53 – Pavlova (Dobrodeyeva)
Shokhina (Savonina, Pirogova) – EN – 58:54	3–1
Shokhina (Polunina) – EN – 59:24	4–1

25 min
Penalties
27 min
10
Shots
8

9 April 2022; 13:00	Biryusa Krasnoyarsk	3–2 OT (0–1, 1–0, 1–1) (OT: 1–0)	Tornado Moscow Oblast	Pervomaisky Ice Arena, Krasnoyarsk; Attendance: 180

Game reference

Darya Gredzen
Goalies
Yulia Volkova
Referees:
Yana Zueva
Arina Ustinova
Linesmen:
Yulia Lavelina
Anastasia Letovaltseva

	0–1	18:57 – Shokhina (Pirogova, Akhmetova)
Lifatova (Horálková, Pavlova) – 29:20	1–1
	1–2	49:22 – Pirogova (Shkalyova, Shokhina)
Pavlova (Lifatova) – PP – 52:51	2–2
Mitrofanova (Danilova) – 63:32	3–2

6 min
Penalties
16 min
30
Shots
27

10 April 2022; 13:00	Biryusa Krasnoyarsk	2–3 OT (1–0, 1–1, 0–1) (OT: 0–1)	Tornado Moscow Oblast	Pervomaisky Ice Arena, Krasnoyarsk; Attendance: 190

Game reference

Darya Gredzen
Goalies
Yulia Volkova
Referees:
Yana Zueva
Arina Ustinova
Linesmen:
Yulia Lavelina
Anastasia Letovaltseva

Lifatova (Dobrodeyeva) – 11:16	1–0
Zenchenko (Danilova, Mitrofanova) – PP – 24:37	2–0
	2–1	31:01 – Pirogova (Shmelyova)
	2–2	42:01 – Malyavko (Savonina, Shokhina)
	2–3	62:18 – PP – Pirogova

10 min
Penalties
6 min
28
Shots
32

=== Semifinals ===
All game times in Moscow Time (UTC+03:00) (1) SKIF vs. (6) Dinamo-Neva

14 April 2022; 16:30	Dinamo-Neva St. Petersburg	2–3 (1–1, 1–0, 1–1)	SKIF Nizhny Novgorod	Yubileyny Sports Palace, Saint Petersburg; Attendance: 150

Game reference

Diana Farkhutdinova
Goalies
Valeria Merkusheva
Referees:
Daria Abrosimova
Elizaveta Kolchina
Linesmen:
Arina Orishchenko
Landysh Nurgaliyeva

	0–1	08:49 – Malinovskaya (Ananyina, Falyakhova)
Ganeyeva (Bolgareva, Vafina) – 11:32	1–1
Vafina – PP – 33:42	2–1
	2–2	52:50 – Bratishcheva
	2–3	56:28 – Starovoitova (Falyakhova, Tejralová)

26 min
Penalties
45 min
12
Shots
10

17 April 2022; 13:00	SKIF Nizhny Novgorod	5–4 (0–1, 4–1, 1–2)	Dinamo-Neva St. Petersburg	KRK Nagorny, Nizhny Novgorod; Attendance: 500

Game reference

Valeria Tarakanova
Goalies
Diana Farkhutdinova
Referees:
Darya Ermak
Elizaveta Kolchina
Linesmen:
Polina Danilova
Diana Mokhova

	0–1	16:30 – PS – Kadirova
Falyakhova – PP – 21:37	1–1
	1–2	36:14 – Bolgareva (Kadirova, Vafina)
Falyakhova (Tejralová) – 37:48	2–2
Bratishcheva (Falyakhova) – 38:44	3–2
Falyakhova (Prokopenko) – 39:33	4–2
	4–3	41:00 – Kadirova (Vafina)
Malinovskaya – 41:45	5–3
	5–4	54:34 – PP – Ganeyeva (Kadirova, Nikolayeva)

6 min
Penalties
10 min
47
Shots
26

(2) KRS Vanke Rays vs. (5) Tornado

15 April 2022; 18:00	Tornado Moscow Oblast	3–2 (0–0, 2–2, 1–0)	KRS Vanke Rays Shenzhen	SC Dmitrov, Dmitrov; Attendance: 740

Game reference

Yulia Volkova
Goalies
Noora Räty
Referees:
Yana Zueva
Aryna Ustinova
Linesmen:
Julia Lavelina
Oksana Vdovina

	0–1	20:28 – Cava
Shkalyova (Dyupina, Nesterova) – 20:52	1–1
	1–2	27:15 – Karvinen (Houston, Nordin)
Shokhina (Dergachyova) – PP – 28:32	2–2
Belyakova (Dergachyova, Shokhina) – PP – 49:57	3–2

12 min
Penalties
12 min
27
Shots
31

18 April 2022; 14:00	KRS Vanke Rays Shenzhen	5–2 (2–1, 3–1, 0–0)	Tornado Moscow Oblast	Mytishchi Arena, Mytishchi; Attendance: 110

Game reference

Noora Räty
Goalies
Yulia Volkova
Referees:
Yana Zueva
Aryna Ustinova
Linesmen:
Julia Lavelina
Anastasia Letovaltseva

Tapani (Liu, Cava) – 08:34	1–0
Karvinen (Cava, Tuominen) – PP – 09:43	2–0
	2–1	19:28 – PP – Dergachyova
Nordin (Cava) – 24:09	3–1
Cava – PP – 34:00	4–1
	4–2	38:43 – Dergachyova (Pirogova, Shokhina)
Cava (Tapani, Karvinen) – PP – 39:39	5–2

31 min
Penalties
27 min
14
Shots
22

19 April 2022; 14:00	KRS Vanke Rays Shenzhen	4–1 (1–0, 3–0, 0–1)	Tornado Moscow Oblast	Mytishchi Arena, Mytishchi; Attendance: 85

Game reference

Noora Räty
Goalies
Yulia Volkova
Veronika Komissarova
Referees:
Yana Zueva
Aryna Ustinova
Linesmen:
Julia Lavelina
Anastasia Letovaltseva

Nordin (Liu, Cava) – 16:02	1–0
Mills – 21:03	2–0
Miller (Houston, Karvinen) – 21:29	3–0
Karvinen (Tuominen) – PP – 31:44	4–0
	4–1	47:49 – Dergachyova (Shokhina)

14 min
Penalties
6 min
24
Shots
43

=== Player statistics ===
Scoring leaders

The following players led the league in playoff point scoring at the conclusion of the semifinals on 19 April 2022.

	Nat	Player	Team	GP	G	A	Pts	PIM
1	(Canada)	Michela Cava	KRS Vanke Rays	5	4	9	13	6
2	(Sweden)	Emma Nordin	KRS Vanke Rays	5	5	6	11	4
3	(Russia)	Anna Shokhina	Tornado	6	5	6	11	6
4	(Finland)	Michelle Karvinen	KRS Vanke Rays	5	5	5	10	6
5	(Russia)	Landysh Falyakhova	SKIF	4	5	4	9	8
6	(Finland)	Susanna Tapani	KRS Vanke Rays	5	3	4	7	2
6	(Russia)	Fanuza Kadirova	Dinamo-Neva	5	3	4	7	2
8	(Russia)	Yelena Dergachyova	Tornado	6	3	4	7	6
9	(Russia)	Alexandra Vafina	Dinamo-Neva	5	2	5	7	4
10	(Czech Republic)	Aneta Tejralová	SKIF	4	0	7	7	2

The following players were the top goal scorers of teams not represented in the top ten of the league, listed with their overall league rank (if available):

- 15. Olga Sosina (F), Agidel: 3 GP, 2 G, 2 A, 4 Pts, 0 PIM
- 17. Valeria Pavlova (F), Biryusa: 2 GP, 2 G, 1 A, 3 Pts, 0 PIM
- –. Yulia Nuyaksheva (F), MSMO 7.62: 1 GP, 1 G, 0 A, 1 Pt, 0 PIM / Mariya Shirshova (F), MSMO 7.62: 1 GP, 1 G, 0 A, 1 Pt, 2 PIM

Belye Medveditsy was shutout in both games played and, as such, none of their players scored a point in the playoffs.

Top goaltenders

The following goaltenders lead the league in playoff save percentage at the conclusion of the semifinals on 19 April 2022.

	Player	Team	GP	TOI	W	L	SO	SV%	GAA
1	Valeria Merkusheva	SKIF	2	119:39	2	0	1	.953	1.00
2	Noora Räty	KRS Vanke Rays	5	273:56	4	1	0	.945	1.31
3	Maria Sorokina	Agidel	2	129:56	1	0	1	.939	1.39
4	Diana Farkhutdinova	Dinamo-Neva	5	307:31	1	3	1	.928	2.73
5	Milena Tretyak	Belye Medveditsy	2	119:37	0	2	0	.916	3.51
6	Dariya Gredzen	Biryusa	3	185:15	1	2	0	.915	2.27
7	Valeria Tarakanova	SKIF	2	119:39	2	0	1	.905	2.01
8	Yulia Volkova	Tornado	6	316:09	3	3	0	.892	3.23
9	Anna Alpatova	MSMO 7.62	2	83:29	0	2	0	.852	5.75

=== ZhHL Championship Finals ===
All game times in Moscow Time (UTC+03:00)

22 April 2022; 16:30	SKIF Nizhny Novgorod	1–3 (0–2, 1–1, 0–0)	KRS Vanke Rays Shenzhen	KRK Nagorny, Nizhny Novgorod; Attendance: 370

Game reference

Valeria Merkusheva
Goalies
Noora Räty
Referees:
Daria Abrosimova
Elizaveta Kolchina
Linesmen:
Oksana Vdovina
Polina Danilova

	0–1	06:13 – Nordin (Cava)
	0–2	14:57 – Kilponen (Tuominen)
Kulishova (Provorova) – 26:18	1–2
	1–3	29:49 – Cava (Kilponen, Nordin)

10 min
Penalties
8 min
19
Shots
40

23 April 2022; 13:00	SKIF Nizhny Novgorod	2–3 (1–1, 1–1, 0–1)	KRS Vanke Rays Shenzhen	KRK Nagorny, Nizhny Novgorod; Attendance: 500

Game reference

Valeria Tarakanova
Goalies
Noora Räty
Referees:
Yana Zueva
Arina Ustinova
Linesmen:
Landysh Nurgalieva
Arina Orishchenko

Prokopenko (Tejralová, Falyakhova) – PP – 10:16	1–0
	1–1	16:03 – Tapani
Likhachyova (Malinovskaya) – 25:27	2–1
	2–2	29:37 – Nordin
	2–3	58:00 – Cava

0 min
Penalties
4 min
36
Shots
22

26 April 2022; 14:00	KRS Vanke Rays Shenzhen	2–1 GWS (0–0, 1–0, 0–1) (OT: 0–0) (SO: 1–0)	SKIF Nizhny Novgorod	Mytishchi Arena, Mytishchi; Attendance: 155

Game reference
Noora Räty	Goalies	Valeria Merkusheva	Referees: Yana Zueva; Arina Ustinova; Linesmen: Julia Lavelina; Anastasia Letovaltseva
Miller (Karvinen) – SH – 36:42 / 1–0; / 1–1 / 43:00 – Kulishova (Bratishcheva, Tejralová)			Referees: Yana Zueva; Arina Ustinova; Linesmen: Julia Lavelina; Anastasia Letovaltseva
Tapani; Houston (miss); Miller; Cava	Shootout	(miss) Starovoitova; (miss) Kulishova; (miss) Tejralová	Referees: Yana Zueva; Arina Ustinova; Linesmen: Julia Lavelina; Anastasia Letovaltseva
12 min	Penalties	6 min	Referees: Yana Zueva; Arina Ustinova; Linesmen: Julia Lavelina; Anastasia Letovaltseva
43	Shots	41	Referees: Yana Zueva; Arina Ustinova; Linesmen: Julia Lavelina; Anastasia Letovaltseva
