= 2020–21 ZhHL season =

6th season of the Zhenskaya Hockey League

- League: Zhenskaya Hockey League
- Sport: Ice hockey
- Duration: Regular season; 3 October 2020 – 27 February 2021; Playoffs; 3 March – 11 September
- Number of matches: 112
- Number of teams: 8
- TV partner(s): KHL TV; YouTube

Regular season
- Season champions: KRS Vanke Rays
- Runners-up: Agidel Ufa
- Season MVP: Valeria Merkusheva (SKIF)
- Top scorer: Alex Carpenter (Vanke Rays)

Playoffs
- Playoffs MVP: Olga Sosina (Agidel)
- Finals champions: Agidel Ufa
- Runners-up: KRS Vanke Rays

Seasons
- ← 2019–20 2021–22 →

The 2020–21 ZhHL season was the sixth season of the Zhenskaya Hockey League (ZhHL) since the league was established in 2015. It was the 26th season in which the women's ice hockey Russian Championship was contested.

== League business ==
=== Team changes ===
In the first week of July 2020, Dynamo St. Petersburg unexpectedly announced that they would be withdrawing from the league immediately, due to insufficient funding. Seven Dynamo players were then signed by SK Gorny St. Petersburg, but that club soon ran into financial difficulties as well, due in large part to being dropped by their main sponsor.

A few weeks after Dynamo's folding, the league announced the creation of a new team, МSМО 7.62 to fill the vacancy. Playing out of Podmoskovie Ice Palace in Voskresensk, Moscow Oblast, 7.62's roster was filed entirely by players 18 and under, several of whom were members of the Russian national junior team.

Ultimately, SK Gorny was unable to attract sufficient sponsor investment and folded. Facing the very real possibility of St. Petersburg having zero ZhHL teams active for the 2020–21 season, a partnership between the junior department of HC Dinamo Saint Petersburg and the SKA-Neva club was able to establish a new team at the last moment. The team, called Dinamo-Neva Saint Petersburg (also romanized as Dynamo-Neva), included players from the 2019–20 rosters of both Dynamo St. Petersburg and SK Gorny and was coached by Russian women's national team head coach Yevgeni Bobariko.

=== Schedule ===
On 19 August 2020, the league released its schedule for the season, with the opening matches to be played on the 19 September. The schedule included a two-month gap without any games from December to February, time that could be used to accommodate rescheduling due to the pandemic and in which the league's All-Star Game and the 2021 Winter Universiade would be held (the Universiade was later rescheduled for December 2021 and ultimately cancelled). However, a day before the season was due to begin, the league postponed the start of the season to 3 October after encountering issues securing Russian visas for KRS Vanke Rays players – all but two of whom were international players – and in the hopes that SK Gorny may find sufficient sponsorships to participate. The delay also allowed teams to hold a short pre-season training camp.

=== Showcases ===
On 22 December 2020, the Russian national ZhHL team (active ZhHL players who are also members of the Russian national team) competed in the second annual "Priceless Match" (Russian: Бесценный матч, romanized: Bestsennyy match), an outdoor showcase game which pits the team against a men's team of high-profile Russian retired athletes, business executives, and arts and entertainment personalities.

=== COVID-19 impact ===
KRS Vanke Rays temporarily relocated from Shenzhen Dayun Arena in Shenzhen to the Ice Palace V.M. Bobrova in Stupino, Moscow Oblast for the 2020–21 season due to the increased immigration restrictions for entry into Russia that were implemented in response to the COVID-19 pandemic in Russia.

Players are tested for the virus once every five days, and before the start of every game.

=== Broadcasting ===
The league streamed many games on its official YouTube channel, the same streaming option used in the previous season. In Russia, select games were also aired on the KHL TV channel.

Limited public attendance was permitted at games throughout much of the season.

== Teams ==
Team	Location	Home venue	Head coach	Captain
7.62	(Russia) Voskresensk	Podmoskovie Ice Palace	Alexander Syrtsov	Darya Kovalenko
Agidel	(Russia) Ufa	Ice Palace Salavat Yulaev	Denis Afinogenov	Maria Pechnikova
Biryusa	(Russia) Krasnoyarsk	LD Sokol	Alexander Vedernikov	Valeria Pavlova
Dinamo-Neva	(Russia) Saint Petersburg	Sports Palace "SPBGBU CFMC and VO"	Yevgeni Bobariko	Alyona Andryushchenko
KRS Vanke Rays	(China) Shenzhen	Shenzhen Dayun Arena	Brian Idalski	Alex Carpenter
KRS Vanke Rays	(Russia) Stupino*	Ice Palace V.M. Bobrova*	Brian Idalski	Alex Carpenter
SKIF	(Russia) Nizhny Novgorod	Trade Union Sport Palace	Vladimir Golubovich	Angelina Goncharenko
SKSO	(Russia) Yekaterinburg	Kurganovo Sports Complex/KRK Uralets	Sergei Chistyakov	Yekaterina Lebedeva
Tornado	(Russia) Dmitrov	Dmitrov Sports Complex	Alexei Chistyakov	Anna Shokhina

*Temporary relocation for 2020–21 season

== Standings ==
The regular season began on 3 October 2020 and concluded on 27 February 2021, with the four most successful teams securing playoff berths.

Pos	Team	Pld	W	OTW	OTL	L	GF	GA	GD	Pts	Final Result
1	KRS Vanke Rays	28	24	2	0	2	130	29	+101	76	Clinch playoffs
2	Agidel	28	19	1	1	7	127	47	+80	60	Clinch playoffs
3	SKIF	28	17	4	1	6	83	37	+46	60	Clinch playoffs
4	Biryusa	28	13	2	4	9	81	79	+2	47	Clinch playoffs
5	Dinamo-Neva	28	12	1	3	12	74	64	+10	41	Do not qualify
6	Tornado	28	10	1	2	15	90	88	+2	34	Do not qualify
7	7.62	28	2	2	0	24	25	143	−118	10	Do not qualify
8	SKSO	28	2	0	2	24	25	148	−123	8	Do not qualify

Updated to match(es) played on 27 February 2021. Source: KHL

The KRS Vanke Rays claimed their first regular season championship title after registering an exceptional 76 point season with a 26-2–0 win–loss record. The KRS Vanke Rays victory decisively ended the three-season reign of Agidel Ufa as regular season champs, with Agidel finishing sixteen points behind the Vanke Rays with a 20-7-1 record. SKIF Nizhny Novgorod improved from sixth place in the 2019–20 regular season to claim third place in 2020–21 and were the only team to pose a legitimate threat to Agidel's position in second, ultimately tying Agidel with 60 points and winning more games overall but prevented from higher ranking by an excess of overtime wins in relation to relegation victories. Biryusa Krasnoyarsk claimed fourth place in a repeat of the previous season and trailing the other top ranked teams, with 47 points and a 15-9-4 record.

== Player statistics ==
=== Scoring leaders ===
The following skaters lead the league in points at the conclusion of the regular season on 27 February 2021.

	Player	Team	Pos.	GP	G	A	Pts	+/−	PIM
1	Alex Carpenter	Vanke Rays	C	28	29	27	56	44	6
2	Anna Shokhina	Tornado	RW	28	26	27	53	17	30
3	Olga Sosina	Agidel	LW	27	18	32	50	33	28
4	Nicol Čupková	Agidel	F	25	15	28	43	20	14
5	Valeria Pavlova	Biryusa	F	27	16	23	39	13	8
6	Hannah Miller	Vanke Rays	F	28	17	20	37	24	28
7	Megan Bozek	Vanke Rays	D	28	13	23	36	39	20
8	Anna Shibanova	Agidel	D	28	9	26	35	39	42
9	Nina Pirogova	Tornado	D	28	14	20	34	17	26
10	Rachel Llanes	Vanke Rays	F	28	14	20	33	33	20

KRS Vanke Rays centre and captain Alex Carpenter claimed her second consecutive ZhHL scoring title, averaging two points per game across 28 games and ending the campaign with a total of 56 points (29 goals + 27 assists). Tornado winger and captain Anna Shokhina posted the second highest point total, tallying 53 points (26+27) in 28 games. Carpenter and Shokhina also ranked first and second league for goals, with 29 and 26 respectively. Agidel Ufa winger and alternate captain Olga Sosina topped the league in assists, notching 32 in 27 games and ranking third in scoring with 50 points (18+32).

Megan Bozek of the KRS Vanke Rays was the highest scoring defenceman, earning 36 points (13+23) and ranking eighth overall. Bozek was narrowly followed by defenders Anna Shibanova of Agidel Ufa, with 35 points (9+26), and Nina Pirogova of Tornado Dmitrov, with 34 points (14+20).

Four of the league's eight teams were represented on the list of top ten point leaders for the season: the KRS Vanke Rays, with three forwards and one defenceman; the Agidel Ufa, with two forwards and one defenceman; the Tornado Dmitrov, with one forward and one defenceman; and the Biryusa Krasnoyarsk, represented by forward and captain Valeria Pavlova.

The following players were the top goal scorers of teams not represented in the top ten of the league, listed with their overall league rank:

- 12. Fanuza Kadirova (F), Dinamo-Neva: 28 GP, 20 G, 11 A, 31 Pts, +13, 18 PIM
- 39. Yekaterina Likhachyova (F), SKIF: 28 GP, 16 G, 9 A, 25 Pts, −3, 8 PIM
- 54. Anastasia Nesterova (F), 7.62: 28 GP, 8 G, 2 A, 10 Pts, −23, 12 PIM
- 58. Alina Narudinova (F), SKSO: 27 GP, 5 G, 3 A, 8 Pts, −31, 16 PIM

=== Top goaltenders ===
The following goaltenders lead the league in save percentage at the conclusion of games played on 27 February 2021, while playing a minimum of 600 minutes.

	Player	Team	GP	TOI	W	L	SA	GA	SO	SV%	GAA
1	Kimberly Newell	Vanke Rays	18	993:40	15	1	311	12	6	.961	0.72
2	Valeria Merkusheva	SKIF	22	1241:35	11	7	509	30	4	.941	1.45
3	Anna Prugova	Agidel	18	1041:29	13	3	483	29	5	.940	1.67
4	Darya Gredzen	Biryusa	21	1241:37	11	8	647	50	6	.923	2.42
5	Nadezhda Morozova	Dinamo-Neva	19	964:40	10	6	449	35	1	.922	2.18
6	Diana Farkhutdinova	Dinamo-Neva	15	704:56	3	7	337	27	2	.920	2.30
7	Maria Sorokina	Agidel	11	631:52	6	5	220	18	3	.918	1.71
8	Anna Alpatova	Tornado	18	770:44	6	8	336	39	2	.884	3.04
9	Ravilya Ainullova	SKSO	19	962:48	1	15	736	86	0	.883	5.36
10	Yeva Gubareva	Tornado	19	905:20	5	8	398	48	1	.879	3.18
11	Yulia Volkova	7.62	26	1369:38	2	21	822	100	0	.878	4.38

==== Top backups ====
The following goaltenders served as secondary or backup goaltenders, playing a minimum of 240 minutes but fewer than 600 minutes in the 2020–21 season. Players are ranked by save percentage at the conclusion of the regular season on 27 February 2021.

	Player	Team	GP	TOI	W	L	SA	GA	SO	SV%	GAA
1	Valeria Tarakanova	SKIF	8	387:57	5	0	149	7	3	.953	1.08
2	Milena Tretyak	Vanke Rays	8	415:37	7	0	109	7	2	.936	1.01
3	Noora Räty	Vanke Rays	5	256:28	4	1	102	10	1	.902	2.34
4	Alyona Ashina	Biryusa	8	373:53	4	2	204	21	0	.897	3.37
5	Irina Kostina	SKSO	14	590:41	1	7	355	43	1	.879	4.37
6	Sofya Larova	7.62	12	243:46	0	2	136	30	0	.779	7.38

== Playoffs ==
=== Bracket ===
Semifinals
1	KRS Vanke Rays	2
4	Biryusa Krasnoyarsk	0
2	Agidel Ufa	2
3	SKIF Nizhny Novgorod	1

Finals
2nd place, silver medalist(s)	KRS Vanke Rays	1
1st place, gold medalist(s)	Agidel Ufa	2

=== Semifinals ===
==== (1) KRS Vanke Rays vs. (4) Biryusa ====
Vanke Rays – Biryusa 2–0
3 March 2021	Vanke Rays	Biryusa	3-0
4 March 2021	Biryusa	Vanke Rays	2-4
KRS Vanke Rays won the series in two games.

All game times in Moscow Time (UTC+03:00)

3 March 2021; 09:00	Biryusa Krasnoyarsk	0–3 (0–1, 0–1, 0–1)	KRS Vanke Rays	Fakel Ice Palace, Krasnoyarsk; Attendance: 68

Game reference

Darya Gredzen
Goalies
Kimberly Newell
Referees:
Darya Abrosimova
Darya Ermak
Linesmen:
Anastasia Vasilyeva
Diana Mokhova

0–1	08:23 – Llanes (Bozek, Miller)
0–2	28:08 – Miller (Bozek) (PP)
0–3	51:15 – Llanes (Mills)

6 min
Penalties
10 min
19
Shots
34

4 March 2021; 09:00	Biryusa Krasnoyarsk	2–4 (0–1, 1–2, 1–1)	KRS Vanke Rays	Fakel Ice Palace, Krasnoyarsk; Attendance: 55

Game reference

Darya Gredzen
Goalies
Kimberly Newell
Referees:
Darya Abrosimova
Darya Ermak
Linesmen:
Anastasia Vasilyeva
Diana Mokhova

	0–1	16:06 – Costales (Hanson, Tse)
	0–2	20:27 – Carpenter (Bozek, Miller) (PP)
	0–3	31:26 – Mills (Lum, Tougas)
Zenchenko (Kuznetsova) – 39:11	1–3
Mitrofanova – 50:58	2–3
	2–4	56:15 – Miller (Bozek, Llanes) (PP)

14 min
Penalties
10 min
15
Shots
46

==== (2) Agidel Ufa vs. (3) SKIF ====
Agidel – SKIF 2–1
3 March 2021	SKIF	Agidel	3-2 GWS
4 March 2021	Agidel	SKIF	2-1 GWS
7 March 2021	Agidel	SKIF	3-2 GWS
Agidel won the series 2–1.

All game times in Moscow Time (UTC+03:00)

3 March 2021; 13:00	SKIF Nizhny Novgorod	3–2 GWS (1–1, 1–1, 0–0) (OT: 0–0) (SO: 1–0)	Agidel Ufa	Trade Union Sport Palace, Nizhny; Attendance: 100

Game reference

Valeria Merkusheva
Goalies
Maria Sorokina
Referees:
Yana Zueva
Arina Ustinova
Linesmen:
Polina Danilova
Julia Lavelina

	0–1	00:37 – Sosina (Makhmutova)
Kulishova (Provorova, Bratischeva) (PP2) – 09:15	1–1
	1–2	35:19 – Markova (Shibanova)
Provorova (Starovoitova) – 38:06	2–2

Malyavko
Tejralová (miss)
Smolina (miss)
Kulishova (miss)
Falyakhova (miss)
Shchukina (miss)
Falyakhova (miss)
Malyavko
Shootout
Korzhakova (miss)
Shibanova
Markova (miss)
Čupková (miss)
Sosina (miss)
Batalova (miss)
Luchnikova (miss)
Sosina (miss)
4 min
Penalties
6 min
20
Shots
25

6 March 2021; 11:00	Agidel Ufa	2–1 GWS (1–1, 0–0, 0–0) (OT: 0–0) (SO: 1–0)	SKIF Nizhny Novgorod	Ice Palace Salavat Yulaev, Ufa; Attendance: 180

Game reference
Maria Sorokina	Goalies	Valeria Merkusheva	Referees: Yana Zueva; Arina Ustinova; Linesmen: Polina Danilova; Julia Lavelina
/ 0–1 / 08:14 – Ananyina (Likhachyova); Rodnova (Sosina) – 09:35 / 1–1			Referees: Yana Zueva; Arina Ustinova; Linesmen: Polina Danilova; Julia Lavelina
Rodnova (miss); Shibanova (miss); Beloglazova; Korzhakova (miss); Batalova (miss); Beloglazova (miss); Čupková; Čupková	Shootout	Malyavko; Likhachyova (miss); Smolina (miss); Kulishova (miss); Falyakhova (miss); Malyavko (miss); Falyakhova; Falyakhova (miss)	Referees: Yana Zueva; Arina Ustinova; Linesmen: Polina Danilova; Julia Lavelina
6 min	Penalties	10 min	Referees: Yana Zueva; Arina Ustinova; Linesmen: Polina Danilova; Julia Lavelina
42	Shots	27	Referees: Yana Zueva; Arina Ustinova; Linesmen: Polina Danilova; Julia Lavelina

7 March 2021; 11:00	Agidel Ufa	3–2 GWS (0–2, 0–0, 2–0) (OT: 0–0) (SO: 1–0)	SKIF Nizhny Novgorod	Ice Palace Salavat Yulaev, Ufa; Attendance: 220

Game reference

Maria Sorokina
Goalies
Valeria Merkusheva
Referees:
Yana Zueva
Arina Ustinova
Linesmen:
Polina Danilova
Julia Lavelina

	0–1	14:05 – Falyakhova (Kulishova, Shchukina)
	0–2	18:06 – Tejralová (Likhachyova, Starovoitova)
Rodnova (Sosina, Sviridova) – 55:17	1–2
Sosina (Korzhakova, Shibanova) (EA) – 59:40	2–2

Shibanova (miss)
Čupková (miss)
Beloglazova (miss)
Tyurina (miss)
Mitrofanova
Sosina (miss)
Čupková (miss)
Mitrofanova (miss)
Markova (miss)
Batalova (miss)
Sosina
Shootout
Starovoitova
Malinovskaya (miss)
Likhachyova (miss)
Nadezhdina (miss)
Falyakhova (miss)
Tejralová (miss)
Falyakhova (miss)
Likhachyova (miss)
Starovoitova (miss)
Falyakhova (miss)
Shchukina (miss)
4 min
Penalties
4 min
50
Shots
29

=== ZhHL Cup Final ===
Originally scheduled to be begin on 13 March 2021, the ZhHL announced a postponement of the Zhenskaya Hockey League Cup finals following a positive COVID-19 test for an Agidel player. On 22 March, the league announced that the finals would be postponed until after the 2021 IIHF Women's World Championship Top Division tournament, which had been rescheduled to be held from 6–16 May in Nova Scotia, Canada. The delay became necessary as the required quarantine for Agidel would have created conflicts with the preparations of several national teams for the World Cup. Both teams had a number of national team players: Agidel had several players representing Russia and one player representing the Czech Republic, and the KRS Vanke Rays had players representing the Czech Republic, Finland, Russia, the United States, and several Canadian prospects. At the time of announcement, dates for the rescheduled finals had not been determined.

Ultimately, the 2021 World Championship in Nova Scotia was canceled and the tournament was relocated to Calgary and played during 20–31 August. As promised, the ZhHL Championship Finals were played following Worlds and began on 7 September. This created an unusual situation in which the KRS Vanke Rays participated in the playoff final with a roster of twelve or more players who had not played in the 2020–21 regular season or first round of the playoffs and lost several key players, including captain Alex Carpenter. In contrast, Agidel Ufa added only one player – 15 year old Maria Mikaelyan – and participated in the final with a nearly identical roster to the 2020–21 season.

All game times in Moscow Time (UTC+03:00)

7 September 2021; 14:00	Agidel Ufa	5–2 (3–1, 1–0, 1–1)	KRS Vanke Rays	Ufa Sports Palace; Attendance: 180

Game reference

Anna Prugova
Goalies
Kimberly Newell

Sviridova (Korzhakova) – 00:34	1–0
Sosina – 02:42	2–0
	2–1	07:06 – Karvinen (Cava, Nordin)
Lucák-Čupková (Batalova, Sosina) (PP) – 09:21	3–1
Luchnikova (Markova, Pechnikova) – 24:44	4–1
	4–2	48:01 – Mills (Tapani)
Markova (Lucák-Čupková, Rodnova) (ENG) – 58:39	5–2

2 min
Penalties
6 min
30
Shots
38

10 September 2021; 14:00	KRS Vanke Rays	4–1 (0–1, 1–0, 3–0)	Agidel Ufa	Mytishchi Arena; Attendance: 147

Game reference

Kimberly Newell
Goalies
Anna Prugova

	0–1	11:24 – Mitrofanova
Karvinen (Tse) – 29:57	1–1
Tapani (Houston) – 43:06	2–1
Karvinen (Houston) – 45:36	3–1
Mills (Tapani, Houston) (PP) – 51:11	4–1

12 min
Penalties
10 min
41
Shots
21

11 September 2021; 13:00	KRS Vanke Rays	2–3 GWS (1–1, 0–0, 1–1) (OT: 0–0) (SO: 0–1)	Agidel Ufa	Mytishchi Arena; Attendance: 158

Game reference

Kimberly Newell
Goalies
Maria Sorokina

	0–1	12:05 – Mikaelyan (Korzhakova, Sviridova)
Lum (Tiessen, Cava) – 14:14	1–1
Mills (Cogan) – 45:05	2–1
	2–2	56:45 – Markova (Luchnikova, Rodnova)

Karvinen
Tuominen (miss)
Nordin (miss)
Cava
Tapani (miss)
Karvinen (miss)
Houston (miss)
Shootout
Luchnikova (miss)
Mitrofanova
Čupková (miss)
Korzhakova (miss)
Sosina
Sosina (miss)
Sosina
4 min
Penalties
8 min
42
Shots
32
