= Ice hockey at the 2019 Winter Universiade =

International sporting competition

Ice hockey at the XXIX Winter Universiade
- Dates: 1–12 March 2019
- Teams: 12 (men); 6 (women)

Ice hockey at the 2019 Winter Universiade was held from 1 to 12 March at the Crystal Ice Arena (men's tournament) and from 1 to 11 March at the Pervomaisky Ice Arena and Arena Sever (women's tournament) in Krasnoyarsk.

== Venues ==
Krasnoyarsk
Men	Women	
Crystal Ice Arena; Capacity: 3500	Arena Sever; Capacity: 3000	Pervomaisky Ice Arena; Capacity: 200

== Men's tournament ==
2019 Winter Universiade men's tournament
Tournament details
- Host country: Russia
- Venue: 1 (in 1 host city)
- Dates: 1–12 March
- Teams: 12

Final positions
- Champions: Russia (8th title)
- Runners-up: Slovakia
- Third place: Canada
- Fourth place: Kazakhstan

Tournament statistics
- Games played: 34
- Goals scored: 259 (7.62 per game)
- Scoring leader: (Kazakhstan) Valeri Gurin (17 points)

Official website
- results.krsk2019.ru

=== Preliminary round ===
==== Group A ====
Pos	Team	Pld	W	OTW	OTL	L	GF	GA	GD	Pts	Qualification
1	Russia (H)	5	4	1	0	0	29	7	+22	14	Semifinals
2	Slovakia	5	4	0	1	0	26	10	+16	13	Semifinals
3	Czech Republic	5	3	0	0	2	19	15	+4	9	
4	United States	5	2	0	0	3	17	15	+2	6	
5	Hungary	5	1	0	0	4	4	29	−25	3	
6	Japan	5	0	0	0	5	8	27	−19	0	

Source: Krasnoyarsk 2019
(H) Host

All times are local (UTC+7).

1 March 2019; 12:30	Hungary	3–2 (0–0, 3–0, 0–2)	Japan	Crystal Ice Arena, Krasnoyarsk

Game reference

Kristóf Dobos
Goalies
Shun Furukawa
Yujiro Isobe
Referees:
(Russia) Stanislav Raming
(United States) Andrew Wilk
Linesmen:
(Kazakhstan) Anton Boryayev
(United Kingdom) Ryan Fraley

Erőss (Könczei, Turbucz) – 29:02	1–0
Lőczi (Czakó, Bernáth) – 36:45	2–0
Könczei (Bukor) – 38:12	3–0
	3–1	43:32 – Sawade (Suzuki) (PP)
	3–2	44:50 – Soma (Tokuda, Shibata)

8 min
Penalties
0 min
22
Shots
38

1 March 2019; 16:00	Czech Republic	4–1 (1–0, 2–0, 1–1)	United States	Crystal Ice Arena, Krasnoyarsk

Game reference

David Pirs
Goalies
Kristian Oldham
Referees:
(Germany) Lukas Kohlmüller
(Finland) Sakari Suominen
Linesmen:
(Serbia) Ivan Nedeljković
(Russia) Roman Slavikovskii

Krliš (Planý, Sana) (PP) – 13:25	1–0
Sana (Planý, Sedlák) (PP) – 22:01	2–0
Krliš (Planý, Ballner) – 32:30	3–0
	3–1	41:26 – Mitchell (Ryan)
Planý – 54:29	4–1

4 min
Penalties
10 min
27
Shots
28

1 March 2019; 19:30	Slovakia	1–2 OT (1–0, 0–0, 0–1) (OT: 0–1)	Russia	Crystal Ice Arena, Krasnoyarsk

Game reference

Matej Tomek
Goalies
Nikita Serebryakov
Referees:
(Sweden) Pär Eriksson
(Canada) Michael Langin
Linesmen:
(Switzerland) Yannick Rebetez
(Latvia) Dāvis Zunde

Vybíral (Rzavský) – 08:50	1–0
	1–1	55:08 – Rudenkov
	1–2	62:52 – Morozov

20 min
Penalties
6 min
12
Shots
45

3 March 2019; 12:30	United States	8–1 (4–0, 1–0, 3–1)	Hungary	Crystal Ice Arena, Krasnoyarsk; Attendance: 2,603

Game reference
2 min	Penalties	6 min
55	Shots	15

3 March 2019; 16:00	Czech Republic	2–7 (1–3, 1–1, 0–3)	Slovakia	Crystal Ice Arena, Krasnoyarsk; Attendance: 2,685

Game reference
12 min	Penalties	26 min
34	Shots	31

3 March 2019; 19:30	Russia	10–1 (3–0, 3–1, 4–0)	Japan	Crystal Ice Arena, Krasnoyarsk; Attendance: 2,860

Game reference

Nikita Bogdanov
Goalies
Yujiro Isobe
Ryota Koda
Referees:
(Germany) Lukas Kohlmüller
(Czech Republic) Tomáš Veselý
Linesmen:
(Kazakhstan) Anton Boryayev
(Switzerland) Yannick Rebetez

Larichev (Dzhioshvili, Kvartalnov) – 08:50	1–0
Kvartalnov (Larichev, Dzhioshvili) (PP) – 11:59	2–0
Rudenkov (Kamalov, Kudako) – 17:04	3–0
	3–1	30:20 – Sawade (Suzuki, Shinoda) (PP)
Medvedev (Sharov, Larichev) – 33:58	4–1
Dzhioshvili (Kamalov) – 36:13	5–1
Kolgotin (Medvedev, Sharov) (PP) – 36:51	6–1
Shevchenko (Sharov, Misnikov) – 45:12	7–1
Rudenkov (Dzhioshvili) – 51:20	8–1
Shevchenko (Misnikov, Kamalov) – 53:37	9–1
Morozov (Orlovich-Grudkov, Kamalov) – 56:44	10–1

10 min
Penalties
6 min
52
Shots
14

5 March 2019; 12:30	Czech Republic	7–0 (2–0, 3–0, 2–0)	Hungary	Crystal Ice Arena, Krasnoyarsk; Attendance: 2,517

Game reference
10 min	Penalties	0 min
43	Shots	18

5 March 2019; 16:00	Slovakia	8–3 (4–1, 1–2, 3–0)	Japan	Crystal Ice Arena, Krasnoyarsk; Attendance: 2,442

Game reference
12 min	Penalties	4 min
34	Shots	15

5 March 2019; 19:30	Russia	3–2 (1–0, 1–2, 1–0)	United States	Crystal Ice Arena, Krasnoyarsk; Attendance: 3,980

Game reference

Nikita Serebryakov
Goalies
Kristian Oldham
Referees:
(Canada) Michael Langin
(Finland) Sakari Suominen
Linesmen:
(Slovakia) Tomáš Gegáň
(Serbia) Ivan Nedeljković

Kvartalnov (Tikhonov) – 18:32	1–0
Rudenkov (Morozov, Yakimov) – 27:57	2–0
	2–1	36:01 – Moore (Ryan, Mitchell)
	2–2	39:21 – Jablin (Ryan, Rowe)
Morozov (Rudenkov, Yakimov) – 40:32	3–2

4 min
Penalties
8 min
50
Shots
26

7 March 2019; 12:30	United States	3–6 (0–2, 2–3, 1–1)	Slovakia	Crystal Ice Arena, Krasnoyarsk; Attendance: 2,590

Game reference
4 min	Penalties	8 min
27	Shots	35

7 March 2019; 16:00	Hungary	0–8 (0–2, 0–4, 0–2)	Russia	Crystal Ice Arena, Krasnoyarsk; Attendance: 2,810

Game reference

Kristóf Dobos
Goalies
Nikita Bogdanov
Referees:
(China) Ren Liu
(Czech Republic) Tomáš Veselý
Linesmen:
(Slovakia) Tomáš Gegáň
(Japan) Kazushi Sato

0–1	04:22 – Larichev (Kvartalnov, Tikhonov)
0–2	04:45 – Medvedev (Orlovich-Grudkov, Sorokin)
0–3	22:31 – Misnikov (Voronkov, Shevchenko)
0–4	36:18 – Kamalov (Orlovich-Grudkov, Larichev)
0–5	36:31 – Larichev (Tikhonov)
0–6	39:01 – Kudako (Yakimov, Sharov)
0–7	54:38 – Voronkov (Krylov, Shevchenko)
0–8	58:37 – Rudenkov (Kudako, Orlovich-Grudkov)

6 min
Penalties
4 min
12
Shots
73

7 March 2019; 19:30	Japan	1–3 (0–2, 0–1, 1–0)	Czech Republic	Crystal Ice Arena, Krasnoyarsk; Attendance: 2,752

Game reference
6 min	Penalties	10 min
26	Shots	48

8 March 2019; 09:00	Slovakia	4–0 (2–0, 2–0, 0–0)	Hungary	Crystal Ice Arena, Krasnoyarsk; Attendance: 2,631

Game reference
4 min	Penalties	16 min
59	Shots	13

9 March 2019; 09:00	Japan	1–3 (0–1, 1–1, 0–1)	United States	Crystal Ice Arena, Krasnoyarsk; Attendance: 2,615

Game reference
18 min	Penalties	2 min
22	Shots	38

9 March 2019; 19:30	Russia	6–3 (1–0, 2–1, 3–2)	Czech Republic	Crystal Ice Arena, Krasnoyarsk; Attendance: 3,035

Game reference

Nikita Serebryakov
Goalies
Ondřej Horvath
Referees:
(Sweden) Pär Eriksson
(Canada) Michael Langin
Linesmen:
(Slovakia) Tomáš Gegáň
(Latvia) Dāvis Zunde

Orlovich-Grudkov (Kolgotin) – 00:50	1–0
Shevchenko (PP) – 22:25	2–0
	2–1	29:57 – Kozák (Arnošt)
Medvedev (Orlovich-Grudkov, Maltsev) (PP) – 36:56	3–1
Rudenkov (Yakimov) – 42:41	4–1
	4–2	45:17 – Bezděk
	4–3	46:04 – Kafka (Duda)
Kvartalnov (Churkin) (PP) – 57:55	5–3
Sharov (Larichev) (ENG) – 59:14	6–3

2 min
Penalties
20 min
48
Shots
24

==== Group B ====
Pos	Team	Pld	W	OTW	OTL	L	GF	GA	GD	Pts	Qualification
1	Kazakhstan	5	5	0	0	0	43	5	+38	15	Semifinals
2	Canada	5	4	0	0	1	38	8	+30	12	Semifinals
3	Latvia	5	3	0	0	2	25	23	+2	9	
4	Switzerland	5	2	0	0	3	16	23	−7	6	
5	Great Britain	5	1	0	0	4	9	51	−42	3	
6	Sweden	5	0	0	0	5	9	30	−21	0	

Source: Krasnoyarsk 2019

1 March 2019; 09:00	Latvia	6–4 (0–1, 5–2, 1–1)	Switzerland	Crystal Ice Arena, Krasnoyarsk

Game reference

Deniss Baranovs
Goalies
Wolfgang Zürrer
Referees:
(China) Liu Ren
(Czech Republic) Tomáš Veselý
Linesmen:
(Hungary) Barna Kis-Király
(Slovakia) Tomáš Gegáň

	0–1	08:21 – Torino (Fleury)
	0–2	22:50 – Maraffio (Torino, Fleury)
Kaimiņš (Veidenbaums, Štelmahers) – 24:42	1–2
Mamčics (PP) – 29:16	2–2
	2–3	32:20 – A. Valenza (L. Valenza)
Millers (Zelts, Vībāns) – 33:41	3–3
Visockis (Mamčics, Minajevs) – 37:14	4–3
Petraškevičs (Zelts) – 37:29	5–3
	5–4	55:18 – A. Valenza (L. Valenza) (PP)
Zelts (SH) – 59:17	6–4

8 min
Penalties
10 min
39
Shots
14

2 March 2019; 08:30	Switzerland	3–1 (1–0, 2–0, 0–1)	Sweden	Crystal Ice Arena, Krasnoyarsk; Attendance: 2,296

Game reference

Lars Lenze
Goalies
Jacob Wallstedt
Referees:
(Finland) Sakari Suominen
(Kazakhstan) Vladimir Yefremov
Linesmen:
(Serbia) Ivan Nedeljković
(Japan) Kazushi Sato

L. Valenza (A. Valenza, Petrig) – 14:43	1–0
Paris (Derder) – 23:41	2–0
Ryf (A. Valenza) – 27:47	3–0
	3–1	56:37 – Hjärtquist (Örtevall, Landberg)

4 min
Penalties
6 min
36
Shots
24

2 March 2019; 11:45	Canada	12–0 (3–0, 7–0, 2–0)	Great Britain	Crystal Ice Arena, Krasnoyarsk; Attendance: 2,532

Game reference

Dawson MacAuley
Goalies
Adam Long
Thomas Hovell
Referees:
(Sweden) Pär Eriksson
(Russia) Stanislav Raming
Linesmen:
(Hungary) Barna Kis-Király
(Russia) Roman Slavikovskii

Frei (Yuill) – 01:43	1–0
Patterson (Henry, Thomson) – 09:16	2–0
Morgan (Frei, Maaskant) – 15:04	3–0
McFadden (Maaskant) – 20:26	4–0
Chyzowski (Henry, Léveillé) – 24:35	5–0
Morgan (Chyzowski) – 28:20	6–0
Hanlon (Léveillé, Boivin) – 30:22	7–0
Neill (Harper, Morgan) – 32:19	8–0
Morgan (Maaskant, Zajac) – 32:42	9–0
Del Paggio (Harper, Neill) – 35:27	10–0
Hanlon – 41:28	11–0
Del Paggio (Harper, McFadden) – 44:10	12–0

4 min
Penalties
0 min
66
Shots
11

2 March 2019; 15:00	Latvia	1–10 (0–4, 1–3, 0–3)	Kazakhstan	Crystal Ice Arena, Krasnoyarsk; Attendance: 2,527

Game reference

Guntars Reiss
Deniss Baranovs
Goalies
Sergey Kudryavtsev
Referees:
(Germany) Lukas Kohlmüller
(Canada) Michael Langin
Linesmen:
(United Kingdom) Ryan Fraley
(Slovakia) Tomáš Gegáň

	0–1	08:32 – Shestakov (Likhotnikov)
	0–2	12:11 – Savitsky (Likhotnikov) (PP)
	0–3	15:38 – Nekryach (Gurin) (PP)
	0–4	16:12 – Nekryach (Alexandrov, Shalapov)
	0–5	27:18 – Titov (Nikulin, Gurin) (PP)
	0–6	30:56 – Savitsky (Gurkov, Nurgaliev) (PP)
	0–7	34:23 – Pelevin (Gurin, Nekryach) (PP)
Visockis (Nekludovs) (PP) – 36:54	1–7
	1–8	43:18 – Nekryach (Gurin, Pelevin)
	1–9	52:02 – Likhotnikov (Nurgaliev)
	1–10	52:11 – Yakovlev (Nekryach, Gurin)

24 min
Penalties
20 min
17
Shots
41

4 March 2019; 12:30	Great Britain	3–7 (0–3, 2–3, 1–1)	Switzerland	Crystal Ice Arena, Krasnoyarsk; Attendance: 2,438

Game reference
Adam Long; Thomas Hovell	Goalies	Valentin Bauer	Referees: (Canada) Michael Langin (Czech Republic) Tomáš Veselý; Linesmen: (Slovakia) Tomáš Gegáň (Latvia) Dāvis Zunde
18 min	Penalties	12 min	Referees: (Canada) Michael Langin (Czech Republic) Tomáš Veselý; Linesmen: (Slovakia) Tomáš Gegáň (Latvia) Dāvis Zunde
29	Shots	52	Referees: (Canada) Michael Langin (Czech Republic) Tomáš Veselý; Linesmen: (Slovakia) Tomáš Gegáň (Latvia) Dāvis Zunde

4 March 2019; 16:00	Canada	6–1 (1–0, 4–1, 1–0)	Latvia	Crystal Ice Arena, Krasnoyarsk; Attendance: 2,614

Game reference
10 min	Penalties	8 min
38	Shots	20

4 March 2019; 19:30	Kazakhstan	5–0 (0–0, 3–0, 2–0)	Sweden	Crystal Ice Arena, Krasnoyarsk; Attendance: 2,637

Game reference
6 min	Penalties	6 min
57	Shots	7

6 March 2019; 12:30	Canada	6–2 (1–2, 3–0, 2–0)	Switzerland	Crystal Ice Arena, Krasnoyarsk; Attendance: 2,660

Game reference
12 min	Penalties	14 min
43	Shots	16

6 March 2019; 16:00	Latvia	6–3 (0–2, 2–1, 4–0)	Sweden	Crystal Ice Arena, Krasnoyarsk; Attendance: 2,627

Game reference
12 min	Penalties	8 min
42	Shots	20

6 March 2019; 19:30	Kazakhstan	17–1 (5–1, 9–0, 3–0)	Great Britain	Crystal Ice Arena, Krasnoyarsk; Attendance: 2,802

Game reference
8 min	Penalties	2 min
51	Shots	14

8 March 2019; 12:30	Great Britain	0–11 (0–2, 0–4, 0–5)	Latvia	Crystal Ice Arena, Krasnoyarsk; Attendance: 2,780

Game reference
6 min	Penalties	8 min
18	Shots	65

8 March 2019; 16:00	Sweden	1–11 (1–4, 0–7, 0–0)	Canada	Crystal Ice Arena, Krasnoyarsk; Attendance: 2,934

Game reference
4 min	Penalties	0 min
12	Shots	63

8 March 2019; 19:30	Switzerland	0–7 (0–3, 0–2, 0–2)	Kazakhstan	Crystal Ice Arena, Krasnoyarsk; Attendance: 2,624

Game reference
6 min	Penalties	4 min
16	Shots	45

9 March 2019; 12:30	Sweden	4–5 (2–4, 0–0, 2–1)	Great Britain	Crystal Ice Arena, Krasnoyarsk; Attendance: 2,783

Game reference
6 min	Penalties	8 min
35	Shots	30

9 March 2019; 16:00	Kazakhstan	4–3 (2–0, 1–2, 1–1)	Canada	Crystal Ice Arena, Krasnoyarsk; Attendance: 2,876

Game reference
10 min	Penalties	12 min
30	Shots	28

=== Playoff round ===
==== Bracket ====
Semifinals
11 March
Russia	5
Canada	1
11 March
Kazakhstan	0
Slovakia	4

Final
12 March
Russia	2
Slovakia	1
Third place
12 March
Canada	3
Kazakhstan	0

==== Semifinals ====
11 March 2019; 16:00	Russia	5–1 (2–0, 1–1, 2–0)	Canada	Crystal Ice Arena, Krasnoyarsk; Attendance: 3,017

Game reference

Nikita Bogdanov
Goalies
Sébastien Auger
Referees:
(Sweden) Pär Eriksson
(Germany) Lukas Kohlmüller
Linesmen:
(Slovakia) Tomáš Gegáň
(Latvia) Dāvis Zunde

Orlovich-Grudkov (Churkin, Sorokin) (PP) – 10:15	1–0
Sorokin (Kolgotin, Sharov) – 19:59	2–0
Sharov (Orlovich-Grudkov, Kolgotin) – 21:11	3–0
	3–1	33:34 – Lemay (Chyzowski)
Orlovich-Grudkov (Sharov, Sorokin) – 49:22	4–1
Sorokin (Orlovich-Grudkov) (PP) – 53:06	5–1

12 min
Penalties
18 min
35
Shots
25

11 March 2019; 19:30	Kazakhstan	0–4 (0–1, 0–2, 0–1)	Slovakia	Crystal Ice Arena, Krasnoyarsk; Attendance: 2,998

Game reference

Sergey Kudryavtsev
Valeri Sevidov
Goalies
Matej Tomek
Referees:
(Canada) Michael Langin
(United States) Andrew Wilk
Linesmen:
(Russia) Roman Slavikovskii
(Switzerland) Yannick Rebetez

0–1	04:59 – Zlocha (Smolka, Bačík) (PP)
0–2	30:11 – Vybíral (Kasanický, Zlocha) (PP)
0–3	35:19 – Šmida (Bačík, Klema)
0–4	59:38 – Rzavský (Marcinek, Ďurkech (ENG)

8 min
Penalties
12 min
47
Shots
21

==== Bronze medal game ====
12 March 2019; 11:00	(bronze) Canada	3–0 (0–0, 2–0, 1–0)	Kazakhstan	Crystal Ice Arena, Krasnoyarsk; Attendance: 2,712

Game reference

Sébastien Auger
Goalies
Sergey Kudryavtsev
Referees:
(Russia) Stanislav Raming
(United States) Andrew Wilk
Linesmen:
(Slovakia) Tomáš Gegáň
(Russia) Roman Slavikovskii

Wallace (Patterson) – 26:50	1–0
Del Paggio – 27:32	2–0
Harper (Del Paggio, Léveillé) (ENG) – 59:26	3–0

2 min
Penalties
2 min
32
Shots
39

==== Gold medal game ====
12 March 2019; 15:00	(gold) Russia	2–1 (0–0, 1–1, 1–0)	Slovakia (silver)	Crystal Ice Arena, Krasnoyarsk; Attendance: 2,963

Game reference

Nikita Bogdanov
Goalies
Matej Tomek
Referees:
(Canada) Michael Langin
(Finland) Sakari Suominen
Linesmen:
(Serbia) Ivan Nedeljković
(Latvia) Dāvis Zunde

Dzhioshvili (Churkin) – 35:36	1–0
	1–1	37:01 – Šmida (Šiška, Marcinek)
Kolgotin (Shevchenko) – 41:49	2–1

4 min
Penalties
4 min
54
Shots
16

=== Final standings ===
1st place, gold medalist(s)	Russia
2nd place, silver medalist(s)	Slovakia
3rd place, bronze medalist(s)	Canada
4	Kazakhstan
5	Czech Republic
6	Latvia
7	United States
8	Switzerland
9	Hungary
10	Great Britain
11	Japan
12	Sweden

Source: Krasnoyarsk 2019

=== Scoring leaders ===
List shows the top skaters sorted by points, then goals.

Pos	Player	Country	GP	G	A	Pts	+/−	PIM
1	Valeri Gurin	Kazakhstan	7	5	12	17	+8	4
2	Anton Nekryach	Kazakhstan	7	9	5	14	+10	2
3	Daniel Rzavský	Slovakia	6	6	4	10	+10	2
4	Stephen Harper	Canada	7	4	6	10	+10	0
5	Denis Orlovich-Grudkov	Russia	6	3	7	10	+6	2
6	Christophe Boivin	Canada	7	4	5	9	+4	2
7	Jakub Planý	Czech Republic	5	3	6	9	+5	0
8	Andrei Yakovlev	Kazakhstan	7	3	6	9	+10	0
9	Vladislav Nikulin	Japan	7	4	4	8	+8	0
10	Carl Neill	Canada	7	2	6	8	+11	0
10	Alexander Sharov	Russia	7	2	6	8	+8	2
10	Juraj Šiška	Slovakia	7	2	6	8	+7	4

GP = Games played; G = Goals; A = Assists; Pts = Points; +/− = P Plus–minus; PIM = Penalties In Minutes
Source: Krasnoyarsk 2019

== Women's tournament ==
2019 Winter Universiade women's tournament
Tournament details
- Host country: Russia
- Venues: 2 (in 1 host city)
- Dates: 1–11 March
- Teams: 6

Final positions
- Champions: Russia (3rd title)
- Runners-up: Canada
- Third place: Japan
- Fourth place: United States

Tournament statistics
- Games played: 19
- Goals scored: 131 (6.89 per game)
- Attendance: 10,287 (541 per game)
- Scoring leader: (Russia) Valeria Pavlova (14 points)

Official website
- results.krsk2019.ru

=== Preliminary round ===
Pos	Team	Pld	W	OTW	OTL	L	GF	GA	GD	Pts	Qualification
1	Russia (H)	5	5	0	0	0	45	3	+42	15	Semifinals
2	Canada	5	4	0	0	1	25	6	+19	12	Semifinals
3	Japan	5	3	0	0	2	18	15	+3	9	Semifinals
4	United States	5	2	0	0	3	12	16	−4	6	Semifinals
5	China	5	1	0	0	4	5	34	−29	3	
6	Switzerland	5	0	0	0	5	5	36	−31	0	

Source: Krasnoyarsk 2019
(H) Host

1 March 2019; 12:30	Japan	2–1 (1–0, 0–1, 1–0)	United States	Pervomaisky Ice Arena, Krasnoyarsk; Attendance: 150

Game reference
4 min	Penalties	8 min
43	Shots	25

1 March 2019; 16:00	China	0–10 (0–3, 0–1, 0–6)	Canada	Pervomaisky Ice Arena, Krasnoyarsk; Attendance: 150

Game reference
6 min	Penalties	4 min
3	Shots	91

1 March 2019; 19:30	Switzerland	0–10 (0–4, 0–5, 0–1)	Russia	Pervomaisky Ice Arena, Krasnoyarsk; Attendance: 200

Game reference

Chiara Pfosi
Goalies
Valeria Merkusheva
Referees:
(Austria) Julia Kainberger
(Kazakhstan) Irina Mogilnikova
Linesmen:
(Canada) Jessica Chartrand
(Czech Republic) Kateřina Pipková

0–1	01:07 – Pirogova
0–2	02:02 – Kulishova (Bratishcheva)
0–3	13:58 – Nikolaeva
0–4	19:20 – Falyakhova (Ganeyeva) (PP)
0–5	24:08 – Falyakhova (Shokhina, Kulishova)
0–6	25:42 – Provorova (Shokhina)
0–7	26:53 – Kadirova (Starovoitova)
0–8	32:41 – Pirogova (Shtaryova) (PP)
0–9	34:37 – Bratishcheva (Kulishova, Falyakhova)
0–10	57:15 – Pirogova (Shokhina)

6 min
Penalties
0 min
4
Shots
90

3 March 2019; 12:30	Canada	4–0 (1–0, 2–0, 1–0)	Japan	Pervomaisky Ice Arena, Krasnoyarsk; Attendance: 157

Game reference
12 min	Penalties	8 min
35	Shots	25

3 March 2019; 16:00	United States	5–2 (2–0, 2–0, 1–2)	Switzerland	Pervomaisky Ice Arena, Krasnoyarsk; Attendance: 127

Game reference
10 min	Penalties	6 min
56	Shots	21

3 March 2019; 19:30	Russia	13–0 (4–0, 4–0, 5–0)	China	Pervomaisky Ice Arena, Krasnoyarsk; Attendance: 150

Game reference

Valeria Tarakanova
Goalies
Jiang Yue
Referees:
(Canada) Michelle Stapleton
(United States) Laura White
Linesmen:
(Switzerland) Anina Egli
(United States) Erika Greenen

Pavlova (Dobrodeeva) – 00:15	1–0
Kadirova (Nikolaeva) – 01:14	2–0
Shibanova (Pirogova, Dyupina) – 04:54	3–0
Bratishcheva (Shibanova, Shtaryova) – 16:40	4–0
Nikolaeva (Bratishcheva) – 21:54	5–0
Shibanova (Shokhina) – 36:31	6–0
Nikolaeva (Shtaryova, Shokhina) (PP) – 38:24	7–0
Pirogova (Bratishcheva) (PP) – 39:59	8–0
Bratishcheva (Kulishova, Nikolaeva) – 44:50	9–0
Dyupina – 46:25	10–0
Shokhina (Shtaryova, Shibanova) – 51:43	11–0
Bratishcheva (Ganeyeva, Provorova) – 56:41	12–0
Pavlova (Timofeyeva) – 57:40	13–0

6 min
Penalties
4 min
71
Shots
6

4 March 2019; 12:30	Canada	1–0 (0–0, 0–0, 1–0)	United States	Pervomaisky Ice Arena, Krasnoyarsk; Attendance: 150

Game reference
8 min	Penalties	10 min
57	Shots	23

4 March 2019; 16:00	Switzerland	0–3 (0–1, 0–2, 0–0)	China	Pervomaisky Ice Arena, Krasnoyarsk; Attendance: 150

Game reference
6 min	Penalties	6 min
31	Shots	36

4 March 2019; 19:30	Russia	8–1 (3–0, 2–1, 3–0)	Japan	Pervomaisky Ice Arena, Krasnoyarsk; Attendance: 200

Game reference

Nadezhda Morozova
Goalies
Ayu Tonosaki
Referees:
(Kazakhstan) Irina Mogilnikova
(United States) Laura White
Linesmen:
(Canada) Jessica Chartrand
(China) Wang Hui

Pirogova (Dergacheva, Shtaryova) – 04:46	1–0
Dergacheva (Dobrodeeva, Pavlova) – 07:27	2–0
Dyupina (Starovoitova, Kadirova) (PP) – 13:36	3–0
Falyakhova – 23:46	4–0
	4–1	34:53 – Otaki (Miura, Enomoto) (PP)
Pirogova (Shibanova, Pavlova) (PP) – 37:36	5–1
Pavlova (Shibanova, Dobrodeeva) – 40:16	6–1
Pavlova (Shibanova, Dobrodeeva) – 50:32	7–1
Bratishcheva (Ganeyeva, Falyakhova) – 53:01	8–1

8 min
Penalties
6 min
46
Shots
18

6 March 2019; 12:30	China	1–5 (0–3, 1–1, 0–1)	Japan	Pervomaisky Ice Arena, Krasnoyarsk; Attendance: 150

Game reference
10 min	Penalties	6 min
11	Shots	59

6 March 2019; 16:00	Canada	8–2 (2–1, 5–0, 1–1)	Switzerland	Pervomaisky Ice Arena, Krasnoyarsk; Attendance: 150

Game reference
0 min	Penalties	10 min
61	Shots	18

6 March 2019; 19:30	United States	0–10 (0–3, 0–3, 0–4)	Russia	Pervomaisky Ice Arena, Krasnoyarsk; Attendance: 200

Game reference

Hannah Stone
Goalies
Valeria Merkusheva
Referees:
(Latvia) Agnese Kārkliņa
(Canada) Michelle Stapleton
Linesmen:
(Switzerland) Anina Egli
(Finland) Linnea Sainio

0–1	00:57 – Pavlova
0–2	11:04 – Shtaryova (Dergacheva, Shokhina)
0–3	15:49 – Shtaryova (Dergacheva, Provorova) (PP)
0–4	20:59 – Dergacheva (Falyakhova, Ganeyeva)
0–5	26:33 – Shtaryova (Dergacheva)
0–6	39:33 – Pirogova (Falyakhova) (SH)
0–7	45:15 – Shtaryova (Shokhina)
0–8	52:11 – Chistyakova (Kadirova)
0–9	59:20 – Pavlova
0–10	59:45 – Dergacheva (Shokhina, Ganeyeva)

6 min
Penalties
10 min
13
Shots
89

8 March 2019; 12:30	Japan	10–1 (2–1, 4–0, 4–0)	Switzerland	Pervomaisky Ice Arena, Krasnoyarsk; Attendance: 150

Game reference
4 min	Penalties	6 min
69	Shots	4

8 March 2019; 16:00	United States	6–1 (1–0, 3–0, 2–1)	China	Pervomaisky Ice Arena, Krasnoyarsk; Attendance: 141

Game reference
2 min	Penalties	8 min
50	Shots	13

8 March 2019; 19:30	Russia	4–2 (2–1, 1–1, 1–0)	Canada	Pervomaisky Ice Arena, Krasnoyarsk; Attendance: 200

Game reference

Valeria Tarakanova
Goalies
Maude Lévesque-Ryan
Jessica Vance
Referees:
(Latvia) Agnese Kārkliņa
(Sweden) Alexandra Köhl
Linesmen:
(United States) Erika Greenen
(China) Wang Hui

Shtaryova (Shokhina) – 01:35	1–0
	1–1	13:43 – McCann (Bouchard)
Shibanova (Falyakhova) – 14:49	2–1
Pavlova (SH) – 20:27	3–1
	3–2	34:26 – Gentile (Bouchard)
Shokhina (Ganeyeva) (PP) – 45:49	4–2

16 min
Penalties
14 min
45
Shots
20

=== Playoff round ===
==== Bracket ====
Semifinals
10 March
Russia	10
United States	0
10 March
Canada	5
Japan	1

Final
11 March
Russia	2
Canada	0
Third place
11 March
Japan (OT)	2
United States	1

==== Semifinals ====
10 March 2019; 16:00	Canada	5–1 (3–0, 1–0, 1–1)	Japan	Arena Sever, Krasnoyarsk; Attendance: 2,123

Game reference
6 min	Penalties	6 min
38	Shots	20

10 March 2019; 19:30	Russia	10–0 (4–0, 2–0, 4–0)	United States	Arena Sever, Krasnoyarsk; Attendance: 1,982

Game reference

Valeria Merkusheva
Goalies
Jazmin Malinowski
Hannah Stone
Referees:
(Latvia) Agnese Kārkliņa
(Austria) Julia Kainberger
Linesmen:
(Canada) Jessica Chartrand
(Czech Republic) Kateřina Pipková

Kulishova (Nikolaeva, Chistyakova) – 05:16	1–0
Pavlova (Kadirova, Shibanova) – 06:43	2–0
Pavlova (Pirogova, Dergacheva) – 11:02	3–0
Pavlova (Kadirova) – 19:06	4–0
Dergacheva (Kadirova, Shtaryova) – 30:33	5–0
Kadirova (Dyupina, Bratishcheva) – 36:27	6–0
Timofeyeva (Shibanova, Pavlova) – 40:08	7–0
Batalova (Kulishova) – 47:53	8–0
Kadirova (Nikolaeva, Chistyakova) – 55:41	9–0
Falyakhova – 56:16	10–0

8 min
Penalties
10 min
69
Shots
13

==== Bronze medal game ====
11 March 2019; 16:00	(bronze) Japan	2–1 OT (1–1, 0–0, 0–0) (OT: 1–0)	United States	Arena Sever, Krasnoyarsk; Attendance: 1,775

Game reference

Ayu Tonosaki
Goalies
Hannah Stone
Referees:
(Russia) Elena Ivanova
(Canada) Michelle Stapleton
Linesmen:
(Canada) Jessica Chartrand
(Switzerland) Anina Egli

	0–1	13:45 – McNamara (Ash, Reilly) (PP)
Miyazaki (Sasano, Mizuno) – 16:15	1–1
Enomoto – 60:45	2–1

8 min
Penalties
8 min
39
Shots
41

==== Gold medal game ====
11 March 2019; 19:30	(gold) Russia	2–0 (0–0, 0–0, 2–0)	Canada (silver)	Arena Sever, Krasnoyarsk; Attendance: 1,982

Game reference
Nadezhda Morozova	Goalies	Jessica Vance	Referees: (United States) Laura White (Austria) Julia Kainberger; Linesmen: (United States) Erika Greenen (Finland) Linnea Sainio
Ganeyeva (Pavlova, Kadirova) (PP) – 48:28 / 1–0; Shtaryova (Shibanova) (ENG) – 59:49 / 2–0			Referees: (United States) Laura White (Austria) Julia Kainberger; Linesmen: (United States) Erika Greenen (Finland) Linnea Sainio
2 min	Penalties	10 min	Referees: (United States) Laura White (Austria) Julia Kainberger; Linesmen: (United States) Erika Greenen (Finland) Linnea Sainio
42	Shots	34	Referees: (United States) Laura White (Austria) Julia Kainberger; Linesmen: (United States) Erika Greenen (Finland) Linnea Sainio

=== Final standings ===
1st place, gold medalist(s)	Russia
2nd place, silver medalist(s)	Canada
3rd place, bronze medalist(s)	Japan
4	United States
5	China
6	Switzerland

Source: Krasnoyarsk 2019

=== Scoring leaders ===
List shows the top skaters sorted by points, then goals.

Pos	Player	Country	GP	G	A	Pts	+/−	PIM
1	Valeria Pavlova	Russia	7	10	4	14	+13	2
2	Katryne Villeneuve	Canada	7	6	5	11	+12	8
3	Fanuza Kadirova	Russia	7	4	7	11	+12	6
4	Anna Shibanova	Russia	7	3	8	11	+21	4
5	Anna Shokhina	Russia	7	2	9	11	+14	0
6	Alevtina Shtaryova	Russia	7	6	4	10	+16	2
7	Landysh Falyakhova	Russia	7	4	6	10	+13	4
8	Elena Dergacheva	Russia	6	4	5	9	+14	2
9	Chika Otaki	Japan	7	7	1	8	+6	2
10	Nina Pirogova	Russia	7	4	3	7	+9	14

GP = Games played; G = Goals; A = Assists; Pts = Points; +/− = P Plus–minus; PIM = Penalties In Minutes
Source: Krasnoyarsk 2019
