= Torpedo Nizhny Novgorod (women) =

Former ZhHL ice hockey team in Nizhny Novgorod, Russia

ZhHK Torpedo ЖХК Торпедо
- City: Nizhny Novgorod, Russia
- League: ZhHL
- Founded: 14 July 2022
- Folded: 17 April 2025
- Home arena: KRK Nagorny
- Colours: Blue, white, red
- Owner: GAZ Group
- Head coach: Oleg Namestnikov
- Captain: Angelina Goncharenko
- Website: Official website

Franchise history
- HK SKIF
- 1995–1996: Luzhniki Moscow
- 1996–1998: CSK VVS Moscow
- 1998–2000: Viking Moscow
- 2000–2006: SKIF Moscow
- 2006–2022: SKIF Nizhny Novgorod
- ZhHK Torpedo
- 2022–2025: Torpedo Nizhny Novgorod

Women's Hockey Team Torpedo (Russian: Женская Хоккейная Команда Торпедо, romanized: Zhenskaya Khokkeynaya Komanda Torpedo) was a professional ice hockey team that played in the Zhenskaya Hockey League (ZhHL). The abbreviated form of the team name was ZhHK Torpedo (ЖХК Торпедо) or WHT Torpedo and they were alternatively known as Torpedo Nizhny Novgorod (Russian: Торпедо Нижний Новгород). They played in Nizhny Novgorod, Russia at the Culture and Entertainment Complex Nagorny (KRK Nagorny).

The team was established on 14 July 2022, when the team rights of SKIF Nizhny Novgorod were transferred to Hockey Club Torpedo, the parent club of Torpedo Nizhny Novgorod of the KHL and Chaika Nizhny Novgorod of the MHL. On 17 April 2025, HC Torpedo announced that the resources previously committed to the women's team were to be reallocated and ZhHK Torpedo was dissolved.

== History ==
Following the 2021–22 ZhHL season, SKIF Nizhny Novgorod made the decision to leave the ZhHL in favor of handing over the team, including all obligations to the players and league, to HC Torpedo. Hockey Club SKIF retained all results from previous seasons, including twelve championship victories and four European Women's Champions Cup medals.

== Season-by-season results ==
The following list includes all seasons completed by Torpedo Nizhny Novgorod.

Season	League	Regular season										Postseason results
Season	League	Finish	GP	W	OTW	OTL	L	GF	GA	Pts	Top scorer	Postseason results
2022–23	ZhHL	4th	32	15	5	4	8	84	58	59	(Russia) L. Falyakhova 46 (20+26)	Lost semifinal, 1–2 (Agidel)
2023–24	ZhHL	2nd	42	30	3	1	8	164	74	97	(Russia) L. Falyakhova 74 (33+41)	Lost semifinal, 1–3 (Biryusa)

== Team ==
=== 2024–25 roster ===
As of 22 November 2024

Italicized year indicates player was acquired by HC SKIF and has continued with the team following its transition to HC Torpedo. The last player acquired by HC SKIF was Angelina Lylova in April 2022.

No.	Nat	Player	Pos	S/G	Age	Acquired	Birthplace
91	(Russia)	Yekaterina Ananyina	D	L	34	2019	Yekaterinburg, Sverdlovsk Oblast
97	(Russia)	Yevgenia Balobanova	F	L	20	2022	Izhevsk, Udmurtia
89	(Russia)	Varvara Boriskova	F	L	23	2022	Odintsovo, Moscow Oblast
26	(Russia)	Yekaterina Chegosheva	F	L	26	2024	Pereyaslavka, Khabarovsk Krai
11	(Russia)	Darya Dutseva	F	R	18	2022	Lukoyanov, Nizhny Novgorod Oblast
2	(Russia)	Angelina Goncharenko (C)	D	L	31	2019	Moscow
26	(Russia)	Alyona Grachyova	D	L	23	2017	Dzerzhinsk, Nizhny Novgorod
30	(Russia)	Yeva Gubareva	G	L	23	2024	Samara, Samara Oblast
9	(Russia)	Anastasiya Gustomesova	D	L	17	2024	Pervouralsk, Sverdlovsk Oblast
55	(Russia)	Milana Kochemayeva	F	L	16	2023	Volzhsk, Mari El
5	(Russia)	Tatyana Korablina	F	R	24	2020	Lukoyanov, Nizhny Novgorod Oblast
7	(Russia)	Yulia Kucherenko	F	L	17	2023	Yekaterinburg, Sverdlovsk Oblast
18	(Russia)	Irina Kulagina	D	L	25	2023	Voskresensk, Moscow Oblast
43	(Russia)	Yekaterina Likhachyova	F	L	27	2014	Kirovo-Chepetsk, Kirov Oblast
71	(Russia)	Alina Malinovskaya	D	L	21	2020	Zavolzhye, Nizhny Novgorod Oblast
92	(Russia)	Nadezhda Morazova	G	L	29	2024	Moscow
10	(Russia)	Alexandra Nesterova	F	L	20	2024	Blagoveshchensk, Amur Oblast
13	(Russia)	Nina Pirogova	D	L	27	2023	Stupino, Moscow Oblast
53	(Russia)	Alexandra Polonnik	G	L	18	2023	Tyumen, Tyumen Oblast
25	(Russia)	Olga Prokopenko	F	L	22	2020	Staritsa, Tver Oblast
22	(Russia)	Alyona Starovoitova	F	L	26	2020	Korolyov, Moscow Oblast
17	(Russia)	Anna Tishkova	F	L	16	2024	Nizhny, Nizhny Novgorod Oblast
75	(Russia)	Oksana Tyshchenko	D	R	20	2022	Nizhny, Nizhny Novgorod Oblast
59	(Russia)	Yelena Zaripova	F	L	30	2023	Moscow
86	(Russia)	Darya Zubok	D	L	26	2024	Megion, Khanty-Mansia

Coaching staff and team personnel

- Head coach: Oleg Namestnikov
- Associate coach: Alexei Kokurin
- Goaltending coach: Mikhail Vorobyov
- Conditioning coach: Alexei Urazov
- Medic: Nikita Ganyushkin
- Masseur: Dmitry Goryachkin

Management

- General director of HC Tornado: Alexander Kharlamov
- Executive director: Alexandra Strogonova
- Sports director: Yulia Serova

=== Head coaches ===
- Igor Averkin, 2022–23
- Oleg Namestnikov, 2023–
