= Sergei Plotnikov =

Russian ice hockey player (born 1990)

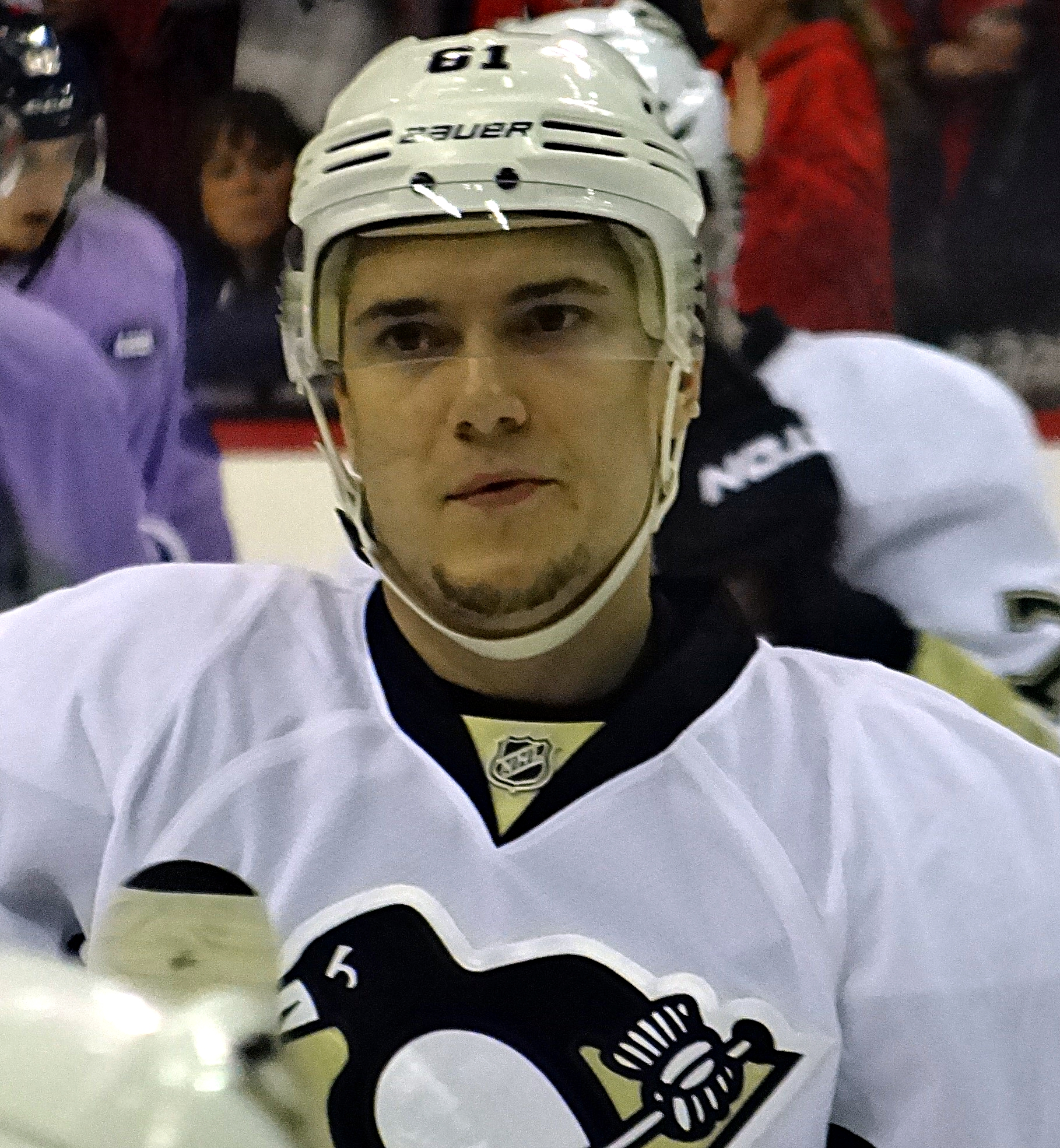
- Plotnikov in 2015 with the Pittsburgh Penguins
- Born: 3 June 1990 (age 36) Komsomolsk-on-Amur, Russian SFSR, Soviet Union
- Height: 6 ft 2 in (188 cm)
- Weight: 198 lb (90 kg; 14 st 2 lb)
- Position: Forward
- Shoots: Left
- KHL team Former teams: SKA Saint Petersburg; Amur Khabarovsk; Lokomotiv Yaroslavl; Pittsburgh Penguins; Arizona Coyotes; Metallurg Magnitogorsk; CSKA Moscow
- National team: Russia
- NHL draft: Undrafted
- Playing career: 2009–present

Sergei Sergeyevich Plotnikov (Russian: Сергей Сергеевич Плотников; born 3 June 1990) is a Russian professional ice hockey forward for SKA Saint Petersburg of the Kontinental Hockey League (KHL). Plotnikov previously played in the KHL with Amur Khabarovsk, Lokomotiv Yaroslavl and CSKA Moscow. He has played briefly in the National Hockey League (NHL) with the Pittsburgh Penguins and the Arizona Coyotes.

== Playing career ==
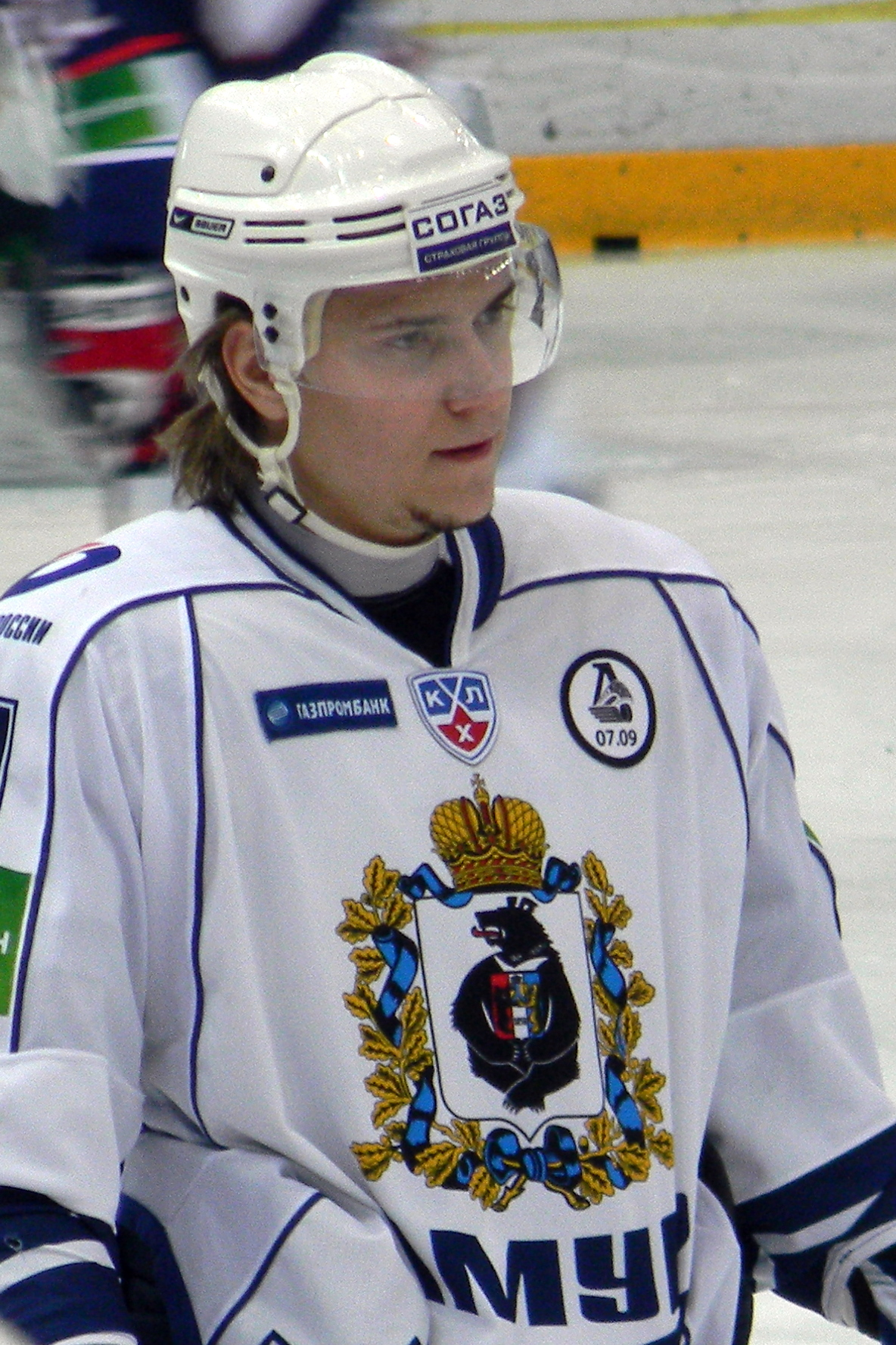

Plotnikov was not drafted by any NHL team. On 1 July 2015, Plotnikov bought out the final year of his contract with Lokomotiv Yaroslavl. He signed a one-year, entry-level contract with the NHL's Pittsburgh Penguins.

In his first North American season in 2015–16, Plotnikov scored just two points in 32 games. From December 2015, he was a healthy scratch for almost two months. Displeased with his lack of playing time, Plotnikov requested a trade and was subsequently traded to the Arizona Coyotes on 29 February 2016 in exchange for Matthias Plachta and a conditional seventh-round draft pick in 2016, dependent on if the Coyotes resigned him. Plotnikov's struggles continued with the Coyotes, unable to find his offensive touch with one assist from 13 games.

As a free agent from the Coyotes and with little success in the NHL, Plotnikov returned to Russia in agreeing to a two-year KHL contract with SKA Saint Petersburg on 1 July 2016.

Following his fourth season with SKA Saint Petersburg in the 2019–20 season, in which he served as team captain, Plotnikov was traded to his original club, Amur Khabarovsk in exchange for Igor Rudenkov on 16 May 2020. Unable to agree to terms with Amur, Plotnikov was soon traded for the second time within the month, dealt to Metallurg Magnitogorsk in exchange for four prospects and financial compensation. He was then signed to a two-year contract on 28 May 2020.

Following a lone season with Metallurg Magnitogorsk, Plotnikov left the club with a year remaining on his contract in agreeing to a one-year deal with fellow KHL club, HC CSKA Moscow, on 6 July 2021.

During his three season tenure with CSKA Moscow, Plotnikov captured two Gagarin Cup championships, before leaving as a free agent and signing a four-year contract to return to former club SKA Saint Petersburg on 24 May 2024.

== International play ==
Medal record

Men's ice hockey

Representing ROC

Olympic Games
Silver medal – second place	2022 Beijing	

Representing Russia

World Championships
Gold medal – first place	2014 Belarus	
Silver medal – second place	2015 Czech Republic	
Bronze medal – third place	2016 Russia	
Bronze medal – third place	2017 Germany/France	
Bronze medal – third place	2019 Slovakia	

Plotnikov won a gold medal with Russia at the 2014 World Championship. He finished the tournament third overall in scoring.

On 23 January 2022, Plotnikov was named to the roster to represent Russian Olympic Committee athletes at the 2022 Winter Olympics.

== Career statistics ==
=== Regular season and playoffs ===
			Regular season					Playoffs
Season	Team	League	GP	G	A	Pts	PIM	GP	G	A	Pts	PIM
2005–06	Amur–2 Khabarovsk	RUS.3	49	6	6	12	86	—	—	—	—	—
2006–07	Amur–2 Khabarovsk	RUS.3	39	12	5	17	38	—	—	—	—	—
2007–08	Amur–2 Khabarovsk	RUS.3	48	20	14	34	100	—	—	—	—	—
2008–09	Amur–2 Khabarovsk	RUS.3	6	4	2	6	18	—	—	—	—	—
2008–09	Yermak Angarsk	RUS.2	26	2	3	5	36	4	2	1	3	2
2009–10	Amur Khabarovsk	KHL	43	6	6	12	30	—	—	—	—	—
2010–11	Amurskie Tigry	MHL	16	12	22	34	32	8	1	5	6	47
2010–11	Amur Khabarovsk	KHL	45	5	8	13	36	—	—	—	—	—
2011–12	Amur Khabarovsk	KHL	53	13	7	20	70	4	0	0	0	8
2011–12	Amurskie Tigry	MHL	1	1	2	3	0	—	—	—	—	—
2012–13	Lokomotiv Yaroslavl	KHL	50	14	16	30	54	5	1	2	3	4
2013–14	Lokomotiv Yaroslavl	KHL	53	15	20	35	88	18	4	10	14	30
2014–15	Lokomotiv Yaroslavl	KHL	56	15	21	36	71	5	1	0	1	33
2015–16	Pittsburgh Penguins	NHL	32	0	2	2	20	—	—	—	—	—
2015–16	Arizona Coyotes	NHL	13	0	1	1	4	—	—	—	—	—
2016–17	SKA Saint Petersburg	KHL	46	11	18	29	53	15	3	3	6	14
2017–18	SKA Saint Petersburg	KHL	55	16	23	39	60	12	1	2	3	37
2018–19	SKA Saint Petersburg	KHL	61	19	20	39	40	18	3	11	14	23
2019–20	SKA Saint Petersburg	KHL	48	8	21	29	81	4	2	0	2	4
2020–21	Metallurg Magnitogorsk	KHL	58	13	30	43	50	12	3	6	9	28
2021–22	CSKA Moscow	KHL	43	16	11	27	23	22	6	7	13	12
2022–23	CSKA Moscow	KHL	65	23	24	47	43	27	4	7	11	18
2023–24	CSKA Moscow	KHL	66	13	13	26	43	5	0	0	0	2
2024–25	SKA Saint Petersburg	KHL	52	21	22	43	30	3	1	1	2	6
2025–26	SKA Saint Petersburg	KHL	61	18	29	47	61	5	0	3	3	4
KHL totals			855	226	289	515	833	155	29	52	81	223
NHL totals			45	0	3	3	24	—	—	—	—	—

=== International ===
Year	Team	Event	Result	GP	G	A	Pts	PIM
2014	Russia	WC	1st place, gold medalist(s)	10	6	6	12	12
2015	Russia	WC	2nd place, silver medalist(s)	10	1	1	2	2
2016	Russia	WC	3rd place, bronze medalist(s)	7	0	1	1	4
2017	Russia	WC	3rd place, bronze medalist(s)	10	3	4	7	10
2019	Russia	WC	3rd place, bronze medalist(s)	3	0	1	1	0
2022	ROC	OG	2nd place, silver medalist(s)	4	0	2	2	2
Senior totals				44	10	15	25	30

== Awards and honors ==
Award	Year	Ref
KHL
All-Star Game	2013, 2015	
Gagarin Cup champion	2017, 2022, 2023	
