= Russia national hockey team =

The Russia national hockey team may refer to:

- Russia national bandy team
- Russia women's national bandy team
- Russia men's national field hockey team
- Russia women's national field hockey team
- Russia men's national ice hockey team
  - Russia men's national junior ice hockey team
  - Russia men's national under-18 ice hockey team
- Russia women's national ice hockey team
  - Russia women's national under-18 ice hockey team

Olympic Athletes from Russia

- Olympic Athletes from Russia men's national ice hockey team
- Olympic Athletes from Russia women's national ice hockey team

Defunct

- Soviet Union national ice hockey team
  - Soviet Union national junior ice hockey team
  - Soviet Union national under-18 ice hockey team
- Unified Team national ice hockey team
