= Olympic Athletes from Russia women's national ice hockey team =

Olympic Athletes from Russia
- Head coach: Alexei Chistyakov
- Team colors
- IIHF code: N/A

Ranking
- Current IIHF: Unranked

First international
- Canada 5–0 (International Olympic Committee) OAR (Pyeongchang, South Korea; 11 February 2018)

Biggest win
- Switzerland 2–6 (International Olympic Committee) OAR (Pyeongchang, South Korea; 17 February 2018)

Biggest defeat
- Canada 5–0 (International Olympic Committee) OAR (Pyeongchang, South Korea; 11 February 2018); United States 5–0 (International Olympic Committee) OAR (Pyeongchang, South Korea; 13 February 2018)

Olympics
- Appearances: 1 (first in 2018)

International record (W–L–T)
- 1–5–0

Olympic Athlete from Russia women's national ice hockey team (OAR) is the International Olympic Committee's designation of select Russian athletes permitted to participate in the 2018 Winter Olympics in Pyeongchang, South Korea. The designation is the result of the suspension of the Russian Olympic Committee after the Olympic doping controversy.

== Women's tournament ==
Russia women's national ice hockey team qualified by finishing 4th in the 2016 IIHF World Ranking.

Team roster

The following is the Olympic Athletes from Russia roster for the women's ice hockey tournament at the 2018 Winter Olympics.

Head coach: (Russia) Alexei Chistyakov Assistant coach: (Russia) Alexander Vedernikov

No.	Pos.	Name	Height	Weight	Birthdate	Birthplace	2017–18 team
1	G	Valeria Tarakanova	1.83 m (6 ft 0 in)	89 kg (196 lb)	20 June 1998	Zavolzhye	(Russia) SKIF Nizhny Novgorod (RWHL)
2	D	Angelina Goncharenko	1.78 m (5 ft 10 in)	73 kg (161 lb)	23 May 1994	Moscow	(Russia) HC Tornado (RWHL)
10	F	Liudmila Belyakova	1.70 m (5 ft 7 in)	65 kg (143 lb)	12 August 1994	Moscow	(Russia) HC Tornado (RWHL)
11	D	Liana Ganeyeva	1.65 m (5 ft 5 in)	62 kg (137 lb)	20 December 1997	Staroe Baisarovo	(Russia) Arktik-Universitet Ukhta (RWHL)
12	D	Yekaterina Lobova	1.67 m (5 ft 6 in)	64 kg (141 lb)	25 October 1998	Novosibirsk	(Russia) Biryusa Krasnoyarsk (RWHL)
13	D	Nina Pirogova	1.73 m (5 ft 8 in)	68 kg (150 lb)	26 January 1999	Moscow	(Russia) HC Tornado (RWHL)
15	F	Valeria Pavlova	1.79 m (5 ft 10 in)	82 kg (181 lb)	15 April 1995	Tyumen	(Russia) Biryusa Krasnoyarsk (RWHL)
17	F	Fanuza Kadirova	1.62 m (5 ft 4 in)	58 kg (128 lb)	6 April 1998	Kukmor	(Russia) Arktik-Universitet Ukhta (RWHL)
18	F	Olga Sosina – C	1.63 m (5 ft 4 in)	75 kg (165 lb)	27 July 1992	Almetyevsk	(Russia) Agidel Ufa (RWHL)
22	D	Maria Batalova – A	1.73 m (5 ft 8 in)	67 kg (148 lb)	3 May 1996		(Russia) HC Tornado (RWHL)
28	F	Diana Kanayeva	1.72 m (5 ft 8 in)	63 kg (139 lb)	27 March 1997	Naberezhnye Chelny	(Russia) HC Dinamo Saint Petersburg (RWHL)
31	G	Nadezhda Alexandrova	1.72 m (5 ft 8 in)	63 kg (139 lb)	3 January 1986	Moscow, Soviet Union	(Russia) HC Tornado (RWHL)
34	D	Svetlana Tkacheva	1.69 m (5 ft 7 in)	56 kg (123 lb)	3 November 1984	Moscow, Soviet Union	(Russia) HC Tornado (RWHL)
43	F	Yekaterina Likhachyova	1.71 m (5 ft 7 in)	63 kg (139 lb)	24 August 1998	Kirovo-Chepetsk	(Russia) SKIF Nizhni Novgorod (RWHL)
44	F	Alyona Starovoitova	1.73 m (5 ft 8 in)	67 kg (148 lb)	22 October 1999	Moscow	(Russia) HC Tornado (RWHL)
59	F	Yelena Dergachyova – A	1.59 m (5 ft 3 in)	55 kg (121 lb)	8 November 1995	Moscow	(Russia) HC Tornado (RWHL)
68	F	Alevtina Shtaryova	1.73 m (5 ft 8 in)	67 kg (148 lb)	9 February 1997	Moscow	(Russia) HC Tornado
73	F	Viktoria Kulishova	1.70 m (5 ft 7 in)	60 kg (132 lb)	12 August 1999	Tyumen	(Russia) SKIF Nizhny Novgorod (RWHL)
76	D	Yekaterina Nikolayeva	1.67 m (5 ft 6 in)	65 kg (143 lb)	5 October 1995	Saratov	(Russia) HC Dinamo Saint Petersburg (RWHL)
88	F	Yekaterina Smolina	1.62 m (5 ft 4 in)	62 kg (137 lb)	8 October 1988	Ust-Kamenogorsk, Kazakh SSR, Soviet Union	(Russia) HC Dinamo Saint Petersburg (RWHL)
92	G	Nadezhda Morozova	1.70 m (5 ft 7 in)	85 kg (187 lb)	29 November 1996	Moscow	(Russia) Biryusa Krasnoyarsk (RWHL)
94	F	Yevgenia Dyupina	1.71 m (5 ft 7 in)	62 kg (137 lb)	30 June 1994	Glazov	(Russia) HC Dinamo Saint Petersburg (RWHL)
97	F	Anna Shokhina	1.70 m (5 ft 7 in)	69 kg (152 lb)	23 June 1997	Novosinkovo	(Russia) HC Tornado (RWHL)

Preliminary round

Pos	Team	Pld	W	OTW	OTL	L	GF	GA	GD	Pts	Qualification
1	Canada	3	3	0	0	0	11	2	+9	9	Semifinals
2	United States	3	2	0	0	1	9	3	+6	6	Semifinals
3	Finland	3	1	0	0	2	7	8	−1	3	Quarterfinals
4	Olympic Athletes from Russia	3	0	0	0	3	1	15	−14	0	Quarterfinals

Source: IIHF

11 February 2018; 21:10	Canada	5–0 (0–0, 3–0, 2–0)	Olympic Athletes from Russia	Kwandong Hockey Centre, Gangneung; Attendance: 3,912

Game reference

Ann-Renée Desbiens
Goalies
Nadezhda Morozova
Nadezhda Aleksandrova
Referees:
(Slovakia) Nikoleta Celárová
(Sweden) Katarina Timglas
Linesmen:
(Finland) Jenni Heikkinen
(Germany) Lisa Linnek

Johnston (Jenner, Saulnier) – 21:55	1–0
Irwin (Johnston) (PP) – 24:13	2–0
Daoust (Agosta, Poulin) – 35:58	3–0
Johnston (Lacquette, Poulin) (PP2) – 48:41	4–0
Daoust (Poulin) – 50:44	5–0

4 min
Penalties
14 min
48
Shots
18

13 February 2018; 21:10	United States	5–0 (1–0, 3–0, 1–0)	Olympic Athletes from Russia	Kwandong Hockey Centre, Gangneung; Attendance: 3,797

Game reference

Nicole Hensley
Goalies
Valeria Tarakanova
Nadezhda Morozova
Referees:
(Canada) Gabrielle Ariano-Lortie
(Sweden) Gabriella Gran
Linesmen:
(Czech Republic) Zuzana Svobodová
(Finland) Johanna Tauriainen

Bellamy (Lamoureux-Davidson, Marvin) – 08:02	1–0
Lamoureux-Davidson (Lamoureux-Morando) – 31:46	2–0
Lamoureux-Davidson – 31:52	3–0
Marvin (Pelkey, Duggan) – 34:38	4–0
Brandt (Cameranesi, Keller) – 58:23	5–0

2 min
Penalties
6 min
50
Shots
13

15 February 2018; 16:40	Olympic Athletes from Russia	1–5 (0–1, 0–2, 1–2)	Finland	Kwandong Hockey Centre, Gangneung; Attendance: 3,353

Game reference

Nadezhda Morozova
Goalies
Noora Räty
Referees:
(Germany) Nicole Hertrich
(United States) Melissa Szkola
Linesmen:
(Germany) Lisa Linnek
(Canada) Justine Todd

	0–1	17:47 – Karvinen (Hiirikoski) (PP)
	0–2	20:20 – Karvinen (Nuutinen, Välilä)
	0–3	39:08 – Välilä
Shokhina (Belyakova) – 44:50	1–3
	1–4	52:49 – Tuominen (Hiirikoski, Nieminen) (PP)
	1–5	55:33 – Nieminen

8 min
Penalties
4 min
25
Shots
37

Quarterfinal

17 February 2018; 12:10	Olympic Athletes from Russia	6–2 (1–0, 2–2, 3–0)	Switzerland	Kwandong Hockey Centre, Gangneung; Attendance: 3,903

Game reference

Nadezhda Morozova
Goalies
Florence Schelling
Referees:
(Slovakia) Nikoleta Celárová
(Sweden) Gabriella Gran
Linesmen:
(France) Charlotte Girard-Fabre
(Finland) Johanna Tauriainen

Shokhina (SH2) – 07:22	1–0
	1–1	20:48 – Müller (Meier)
	1–2	31:47 – Stalder (Stänz, Meier) (PP)
Kulishova (Smolina) – 33:53	2–2
Ganeyeva (Shokhina) (PP) – 38:53	3–2
Dergachyova (Shokhina) – 47:36	4–2
Shokhina (Dergachyova) (PP) – 53:25	5–2
Sosina (SH, ENG) – 59:08	6–2

12 min
Penalties
8 min
21
Shots
19

Semifinal

19 February 2018; 21:10	Canada	5–0 (1–0, 1–0, 3–0)	Olympic Athletes from Russia	Gangneung Hockey Centre, Gangneung; Attendance: 3,396

Game reference

Shannon Szabados
Goalies
Valeria Tarakanova
Nadezhda Alexandrova
Referees:
(United States) Katie Guay
(United States) Melissa Szkola
Linesmen:
(Germany) Lisa Linnek
(Finland) Johanna Tauriainen

Wakefield (Spooner, Turnbull) – 01:50	1–0
Poulin (Daoust) – 23:10	2–0
Wakefield (Fortino, Turnbull) – 41:59	3–0
Clark (Stacey, Mikkelson) – 42:30	4–0
Johnston (Daoust, Irwin) (PP) – 54:08	5–0

4 min
Penalties
16 min
47
Shots
14

Bronze medal game

21 February 2018; 16:40	(bronze) Finland	3–2 (1–0, 2–1, 0–1)	Olympic Athletes from Russia	Kwandong Hockey Centre, Gangneung; Attendance: 3,217

Game reference

Noora Räty
Goalies
Nadezhda Morozova
Referees:
(United States) Dina Allen
(Canada) Gabrielle Ariano-Lortie
Linesmen:
(United States) Jessica Leclerc
(Canada) Justine Todd

Nieminen (Tuominen, Tapani) (PP) – 02:23	1–0
Tapani (Karvinen) – 20:10	2–0
	2–1	22:40 – Sosina (Belyakova)
Välimäki (Hovi) – 32:18	3–1
	3–2	46:03 – Belyakova (Batalova, Shtaryova) (PP)

8 min
Penalties
35 min
22
Shots
22
