= Fanuza Kadirova =

Russian ice hockey player (born 1998)

Fanuza Kadirova Фануза Кадирова
- Born: 6 April 1998 (age 28) Kukmor, Tatarstan, Russia
- Height: 1.63 m (5 ft 4 in)
- Weight: 62 kg (137 lb; 9 st 11 lb)
- Position: Forward
- Shoots: Left
- PWHL team Former teams: Ottawa Charge: Dynamo-Neva St. Petersburg; SK Gorny; Arktik-Universitet Ukhta
- National team: Russia
- Playing career: 2013–present
Medal record
World Championship
Bronze medal – third place	2016 Kamloops
Universiade
Gold medal – first place	2019 Krasnoyarsk	Ice hockey
Gold medal – first place	2017 Astana-Almaty	Ice hockey

Fanuza Fahimovna Kadirova (Russian: Фануза Фахимовна Кадирова; born 6 April 1998) is a Russian professional ice hockey player for the Ottawa Charge of the Professional Women's Hockey League (PWHL) and member of the Russian national team.

== Playing career ==
Kadirova debuted in the Russian Women's Hockey League (RWHL) with Arktik-Universitet Ukhta during the 2013–14 season. She remained with the team as the league was reconfigured into the Zhenskaya Hockey League (ZhHL) from the 2015–16 season and the team became SK Gorny in 2018.

Ahead of the 2020–21 ZhHL season, she signed with Dynamo-Neva Saint Petersburg.

Kadirova was drafted in the sixth round, 45th overall, by the Ottawa Charge in the 2025 PWHL Draft. On 14 July 2025, both Kadirova and compatriot Anna Shokhina signed one-year contracts with the Charge for the 2025–26 season, becoming the first Russian players to sign in the PWHL.

== International play ==
Kadirova has represented Russia at five IIHF Women's World Championships (2015, 2016, 2017, 2019, 2021) and at two Universiades, winning gold in both 2017 and 2019. At the 2018 Winter Olympics, she participated in the women’s ice hockey tournament with the Olympic Athletes from Russia team.

== Career statistics ==
=== Regular season and playoffs ===
Note: GP = Games played; G = Goals; A = Assists; Pts = Points; PIM = Penalty minutes;

			Regular season					Playoffs
Season	Team	League	GP	G	A	Pts	PIM	GP	G	A	Pts	PIM
2015–16	Arktik-Universitet Ukhta	ZhHL	24	16	21	37	8	—	—	—	—	—
2016–17	Arktik-Universitet Ukhta	ZhHL	36	20	27	47	20	—	—	—	—	—
2017–18	Arktik-Universitet Ukhta	ZhHL	24	16	11	27	6	—	—	—	—	—
2018–19	SK Gorny	ZhHL	35	20	16	36	14	—	—	—	—	—
2019–20	SK Gorny	ZhHL	28	17	13	30	8	—	—	—	—	—
2020–21	Dynamo-Neva Saint Petersburg	ZhHL	28	20	11	31	18	—	—	—	—	—
2021–22	Dynamo-Neva Saint Petersburg	ZhHL	34	14	19	33	16	5	3	4	7	2
2022–23	Dynamo-Neva Saint Petersburg	ZhHL	32	19	30	49	14	10	3	10	13	6
2023–24	Dynamo-Neva Saint Petersburg	ZhHL	36	15	31	46	20	12	4	9	13	12
2024–25	Dynamo-Neva Saint Petersburg	ZhHL	42	26	31	57	32	9	5	8	13	8
2025–26	Ottawa Charge	PWHL	28	10	2	12	14	8	2	3	5	2
PWHL totals			28	10	2	12	14	8	2	3	5	2
