= Anna Timofeyeva (ice hockey) =

Russian ice hockey player

Anna Timofeyeva Анна Тимофеева
- Born: 30 November 1996 (age 29) Tver, Russia
- Height: 1.71 m (5 ft 7 in)
- Weight: 75 kg (165 lb; 11 st 11 lb)
- Position: Forward
- Shoots: Left
- Played for: SKSO Yekaterinburg; Biryusa Krasnoyarsk; SKIF Nizhny Novgorod
- National team: Russia
- Playing career: 2011–present
Medal record
Universiade
Gold medal – first place	2019 Krasnoyarsk	Ice hockey

Anna Aleksandrovna Timofeyeva (Russian: Анна Александровна Тимофеева; born 30 November 1996) is a Russian ice hockey player. She most recently played with SKSO Yekaterinburg of the Zhenskaya Hockey League (ZhHL) during the 2021–22 season.

She represented Russia at the 2019 IIHF Women's World Championship and won a gold medal with the Russian team in the women's ice hockey tournament at the 2019 Winter Universiade.
