= Alevtina Polunina =

Russian ice hockey player

Alevtina Polunina Алевтина Полунина
- Born: 9 February 1997 (age 29) Moscow, Russia
- Height: 1.73 m (5 ft 8 in)
- Weight: 65 kg (143 lb; 10 st 3 lb)
- Position: Left wing
- Shoots: Left
- ZhHL team: Tornado Dmitrov
- National team: Russia
- Playing career: 2013–present
Medal record
Representing Russia
Women's ice hockey
World Championship
Bronze medal – third place	2016 Canada
Universiade
Gold medal – first place	2019 Krasnoyarsk
Gold medal – first place	2017 Almaty

Alevtina Pavlovna Polunina, née Shtaryova (Russian: Алевтина Павловна Полунина (Штарёва); born 9 February 1997) is a Russian ice hockey player and member of the Russian national team. She most recently played with Tornado Dmitrov of the Zhenskaya Hockey League (ZhHL) in the 2019–20 season.

Polunina represented Russia at the IIHF Women's World Championships in 2016, 2017, and 2019, winning a bronze medal at the 2016 tournament, and at the Winter Universiades in 2017 and 2019, winning gold medals at both tournaments. She participated in the women's ice hockey tournament at the 2018 Winter Olympics with the Olympic Athletes from Russia team. As a member of the Russian national under-18 team, she participated in three IIHF Women's U18 World Championships during 2013 to 2015, winning a bronze medal at the 2015 tournament.

She made her debut in the Russian Championship league at age 16 with HC Tornado and has remained with the team throughout the entirety of her club career, from the 2013–14 RWHL season onward. With Tornado, Polunina is a three-time Russian Champion, three-time ZhHL All-Star, and was the league’s top goal scorer in the 2015–16 and 2017–18 seasons, scoring 29 goals and 23 goals in 24 games respectively.

The birth of her first child prompted her to sit out the 2020–21 ZhHL season.
