= Fumika Sasano =

Japanese ice hockey player

Fumika Sasano 笹野 文香
- Born: 26 June 1997 (age 29) Aomori Prefecture, Japan
- Height: 167 cm (5 ft 6 in)
- Weight: 63 kg (139 lb; 9 st 13 lb)
- Position: Defense
- Shoots: Left
- SDHL team Former teams: AIK Hockey: Malmö Redhawks; Göteborg HC; Seibu Princess Rabbits; Hachinohe Reds
- National team: Japan
- Playing career: c. 2013–present
Medal record
Universiade
Bronze medal – third place	2019 Krasnoyarsk	Ice hockey

Fumika Sasano (笹野 文香, Sasano Fumika; born 26 June 1997) is a Japanese ice hockey player and member of the Japanese national ice hockey team, currently playing in the Swedish Women's Hockey League (SDHL) with AIK Hockey.

== Playing career ==
Sasano began her career playing with the Hachinohe Reds in the All-Japan Women's Ice Hockey Championship and Group B of the Women's Japan Ice Hockey League (WJIHL).

In 2016, she joined the Seibu Princess Rabbits, the reigning champions of both the WJIHL and All-Japan Women's Ice Hockey Championship. With the Seibu Princess Rabbits, Sasano won five Japanese Championship titles as WJIHL champion in 2016–17, 2017–18, 2018–19, and 2019–20, and All-Japan tournament champion in 2018.

== International play ==
Sasano represented Japan at the 2021 IIHF Women's World Championship. She participated in the women's ice hockey tournament at the 2017 Winter Universiade and won a bronze medal in the women's ice hockey tournament at the 2019 Winter Universiade. As a junior player with the Japanese national under-18 team, she participated in the 2014 IIHF Women's U18 World Championship.
