= Chika Otaki =

Japanese ice hockey player

Chika Otaki 大滝 知香
- Born: 14 December 1998 (age 27) Hokkaido, Japan
- Height: 157 cm (5 ft 2 in)
- Weight: 50 kg (110 lb; 7 st 12 lb)
- Position: Forward
- Shoots: Right
- WJIHL team: DK Peregrine
- National team: Japan
- Playing career: c. 2014–present
Medal record
Universiade
| Bronze medal – third place | 2019 Krasnoyarsk | Ice hockey |

Chika Otaki (大滝 知香, Ōtaki Chika; born 14 December 1998) is a Japanese ice hockey player and member of the Japanese national ice hockey team, currently playing with DK Peregrine in the Women's Japan Ice Hockey League (WJIHL) and All-Japan Women's Ice Hockey Championship.

Otaki represented Japan at the 2021 IIHF Women's World Championship. She won a bronze medal in the women's ice hockey tournament at the 2019 Winter Universiade. As a junior player with the Japanese national under-18 team, she participated in the 2015 IIHF Women's U18 World Championship and the 2016 IIHF Women's U18 World Championship – Division I, Group A.
