= Nikita Kamalov =

Russian ice hockey player

- Born: August 8, 1995 (age 31) Novokuznetsk, Russia
- Height: 6 ft 0 in (183 cm)
- Weight: 176 lb (80 kg; 12 st 8 lb)
- Position: Defence
- Shoots: Left
- KHL team Former teams: Torpedo Nizhny Novgorod; Metallurg Novokuznetsk; Amur Khabarovsk; HC Sochi; SKA Saint Petersburg; Barys Astana; Metallurg Magnitogorsk; Severstal Cherepovets
- Playing career: 2013–present

Nikita Kamalov (born August 8, 1995) is a Russian ice hockey defenceman. He is currently playing for Torpedo Nizhny Novgorod of the Kontinental Hockey League (KHL).

Kamalov made his Kontinental Hockey League debut playing with Metallurg Novokuznetsk during the 2013–14 KHL season.
