= Yelena Dergachyova =

Russian ice hockey player (born 1995)

Yelena Zaripova Елена Зарипова
- Born: 8 November 1995 (age 30) Moscow, Russia
- Height: 1.57 m (5 ft 2 in)
- Weight: 55 kg (121 lb; 8 st 9 lb)
- Position: Centre
- Shoots: Left
- ZhHL team Former teams: Torpedo Nizhny Novgorod; Tornado Dmitrov; Agidel Ufa
- National team: Russia
- Playing career: 2012–present
Medal record
World Championship
Bronze medal – third place	2013 Canada
Bronze medal – third place	2016 Canada

Yelena Nikolayevna Zaripova née Dergachyova (Russian: Елена Николаевна Зарипова (Дергачёва); born 8 November 1995) is a Russian ice hockey centre and member of the Russian national team, currently playing in the Zhenskaya Hockey League (ZhHL) with Torpedo Nizhny Novgorod.

== International career ==
Dergachyova was selected for the Russian women's national ice hockey team in the 2014 Winter Olympics. She played in all six games, not recording a point.

As of 2014, Dergachyova has also appeared for Russia at one IIHF Women's World Championships. Her first appearance came in 2013, where she won a bronze medal.

Dergachyova made three appearances for the Russia women's national under-18 ice hockey team, at the IIHF World Women's U18 Championships, with the first in 2011. In 2013, she was named one of the Media all-stars of the tournament, after scoring four goals in five games.

== Career statistics ==
=== International ===
As of 4 October 2023

Year	Team	Event	Result	GP	G	A	Pts	PIM
2011	Russia U18	WW18 D1	1st	5	2	11	13	8
2012	Russia U18	WW18	7th	6	0	3	3	0
2013	Russia U18	WW18	7th	5	4	5	9	6
2013	Russia	WW	3rd place, bronze medalist(s)	6	1	0	1	2
2014	Russia	OG	DQ	6	0	0	0	0
2015	Russia U25	Uni	1st place, gold medalist(s)	4	2	7	9	2
2015	Russia	WW	4th	6	0	0	0	4
2016	Russia	WW	3rd place, bronze medalist(s)	6	0	0	0	4
2017	Russia U25	Uni	1st place, gold medalist(s)	4	3	7	10	4
2017	Russia	WW	5th	5	0	2	2	20
2018	OAR	OG	4th	6	1	1	2	4
2019	Russia U25	Uni	1st place, gold medalist(s)	6	4	5	9	2
2019	Russia	WW	4th	7	1	2	3	6
2022	ROC	OG	5th	1	0	0	0	4
Junior totals				16	6	14	20	14
Senior totals				43	3	5	8	44
