= Anastasia Chistyakova =

Russian ice hockey player

- Born: 11 February 1997 (age 28) Kolpino, Russia
- Height: 1.73 m (5 ft 8 in)
- Weight: 80 kg (176 lb; 12 st 8 lb)
- Position: Defence
- Shoots: Right
- RWHL team: HC St. Petersburg
- National team: Russia
- Playing career: 2014–present

Anastasia Chistyakova (born 11 February 1997) is a Russian ice hockey player for HC St. Petersburg and the Russian national team.

She represented Russia at the 2019 IIHF Women's World Championship.
