= Liana Ganeyeva =

Russian ice hockey player (born 1997)

Liana Ganeyeva Лиана Ганеева
- Born: 20 December 1997 (age 28) Baisarovo, Russia
- Height: 1.65 m (5 ft 5 in)
- Weight: 62 kg (137 lb; 9 st 11 lb)
- Position: Defense
- Shoots: Left
- ZhHL team Former teams: Dinamo-Neva St. Petersburg; SK Gorny; Arktik-Universitet Ukhta
- National team: Russia
- Playing career: 2012–present
Medal record
Universiade
Gold medal – first place	2017 Astana-Almaty
Gold medal – first place	2019 Krasnoyarsk

Liana Albertovna Ganeyeva (Russian: Лиана Альбертовна Ганеева, also romanized Ganeeva; born 20 December 1997) is a Russian ice hockey player and member of the Russian national ice hockey team. She plays with Dynamo-Neva Saint Petersburg in the Zhenskaya Hockey League (ZhHL).

Ganeyeva participated in the women's ice hockey tournament at the 2018 Winter Olympics with the Olympic Athletes from Russia ice hockey team and represented Russia at the IIHF Women's World Championships in 2017, 2019, and 2021.
