= Valeria Merkusheva =

Russian ice hockey player (born 1999)

Valeria Merkusheva Валерия Меркушева
- Born: 20 September 1999 (age 27) Moscow, Russia
- Height: 1.68 m (5 ft 6 in)
- Position: Goaltender
- Catches: Left
- ZhHL team Former teams: Torpedo Nizhny Novgorod: SKIF Nizhny Novgorod; Dinamo St. Petersburg; SKSO Yekaterinburg
- National team: Russia
- Playing career: 2016–present
Medal record
Universiade
Gold medal – first place	2019 Krasnoyarsk	Ice hockey

Valeria Sergeyevna Merkusheva (Russian: Валерия Сергеевна Меркушева, also romanized Valeriya Sergeevna; born 20 September 1999) is a Russian ice hockey goaltender and member of the Russian national ice hockey team, currently playing in the Zhenskaya Hockey League (ZhHL) with Torpedo Nizhny Novgorod.

Merkusheva represented Russia at the 2019 IIHF Women's World Championship and in the women's ice hockey tournament at the 2019 Winter Universiade. She played under the banner of the Russian Olympic Committee at the 2021 IIHF Women's World Championship and in the women's ice hockey tournament at the 2022 Winter Olympics in Beijing.

== Career statistics ==
=== International ===
Note: GP = Games played; Min, TOI = Minutes played; W = Wins; L = Losses; T,T/OT = Ties; OTL = Overtime losses; GA = Goals-against; GAA = Goals-against average; SO = Shutouts; SV% = Save percentage;

				Regular season
Year	Team	Event	Result	GP	W	L	T/OT	MIN	GA	SO	GAA	SV%
2022	Russia	OG	5th	2	0	2	0	119:26	4	0	2.01	0.915
