= Arena Sever =

Multi-use arena in Krasnoyarsk, Russia

- Арена-Север
- Krasnoyarsk Ice Palace
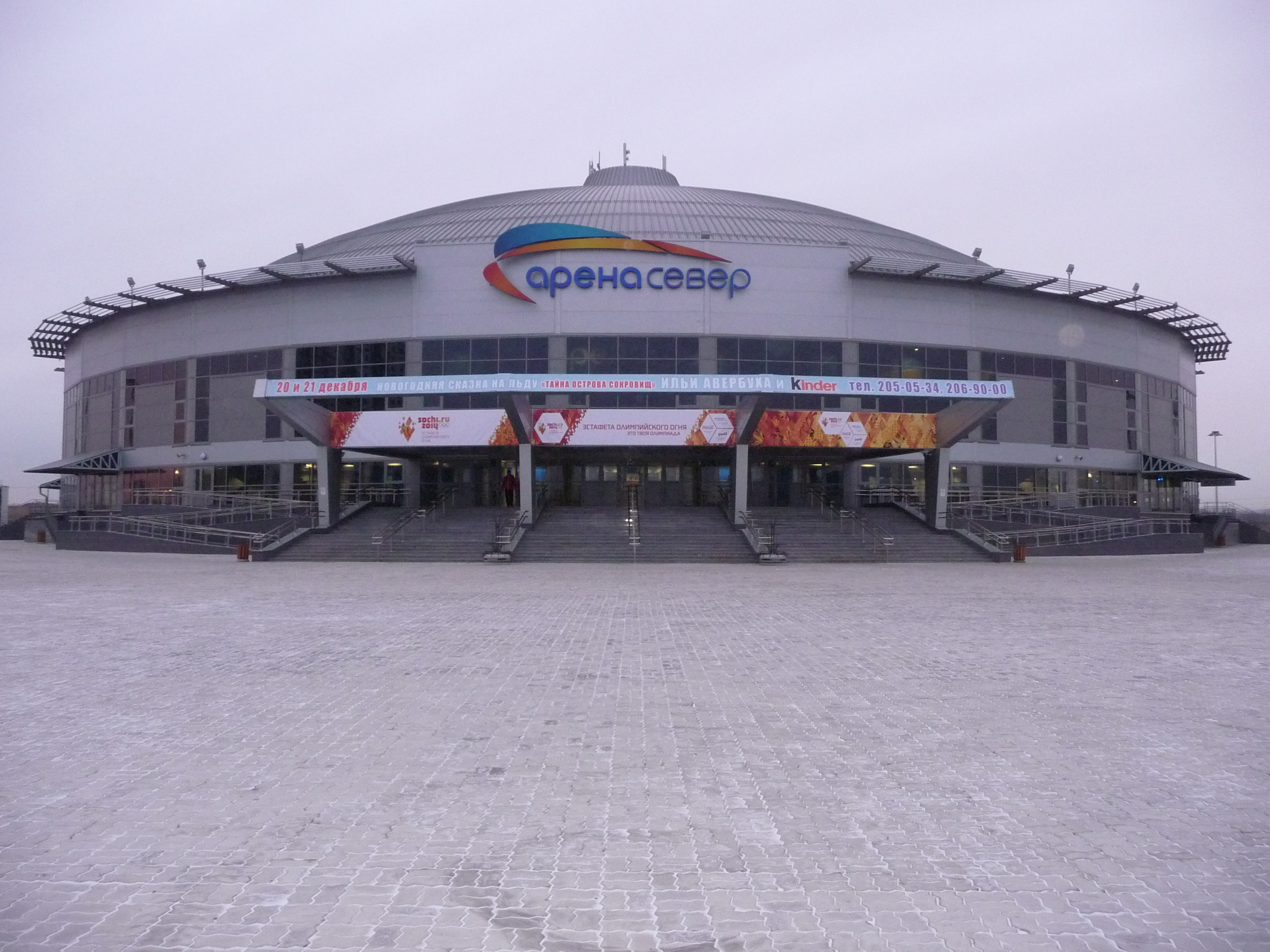
- Interactive map of Arena Sever
- Location: Krasnoyarsk, Russia
- Coordinates: 56°03′01.78″N 92°53′40.92″E
- Capacity: Ice hockey: 2,400; Basketball: 3,128

Construction
- Opened: 2011; 15 years ago

Tenants
- BC Enisey (2011–present); Sokol Krasnoyarsk (2016–present)

Arena Sever (Russian: Арена-Север, lit. 'Arena North') is a multi-use arena in Krasnoyarsk, Russia. The arena was opened in 2011 and it is mainly used for ice hockey and basketball games. It is the home arena of the basketball team BC Enisey and of the ice hockey team Sokol Krasnoyarsk.
