= Igor Rudenkov =

Russian ice hockey player

- Born: March 5, 1995 (age 30); Nizhny Novgorod, Russia
- Height: 5 ft 11 in (180 cm)
- Weight: 194 lb (88 kg; 13 st 12 lb)
- Position: Forward
- Shoots: Left
- VHL team Former teams: Metallurg Novokuznetsk; Torpedo Nizhny Novgorod; HC Sochi; Metallurg Magnitogorsk; Amur Khabarovsk; HC Vityaz
- Playing career: 2014–present

Igor Rudenkov (born March 5, 1995) is a Russian professional ice hockey player. He currently plays with Metallurg Novokuznetsk in the Supreme Hockey League (VHL).

On October 19, 2014, Rudenkov made his Kontinental Hockey League debut with Torpedo Nizhny Novgorod during the 2014–15 KHL season.
