= Yelizaveta Rodnova =

Russian ice hockey player

Yelizaveta Rodnova Елизавета Роднова
- Born: 12 July 1999 (age 25); Chebarkul, Russia
- Height: 165 cm (5 ft 5 in)
- Weight: 61 kg (134 lb; 9 st 8 lb)
- Position: Forward
- Shoots: Left
- ZhHL team Former teams: Agidel Ufa; SKIF Nizhny Novgorod
- National team: Russia
- Playing career: 2015–present

Yelizaveta Alexandrovna Rodnova (Russian: Елизавета Александровна Роднова, also romanized as Elizaveta Aleksandrovna Rodnova; born 12 July 1999) is a Russian ice hockey player and member of the Russian national ice hockey team, currently playing in the Zhenskaya Hockey League (ZhHL) with Agidel Ufa.

Rodnova represented the Russian Olympic Committee (ROC) at the 2021 IIHF Women's World Championship. As a junior player with the Russian national under-18 team, she won a bronze medal at the 2017 IIHF Women's U18 World Championship.

Rodnova made her senior club debut with SKIF Nizhny Novgorod in the 2015–16 ZhHL season. In 2018, after two seasons with SKIF, she signed with Agidel Ufa and, as of 2021, has won three Russian Championships with the team. She was selected to the 2022 ZhHL All-Star Game.
