= Nina Pirogova =

Russian ice hockey player (born 1999)

Nina Pirogova Нина Пирогова
- Born: 26 January 1999 (age 27) Stupino, Moscow Oblast, Russia
- Height: 1.73 m (5 ft 8 in)
- Weight: 68 kg (150 lb; 10 st 10 lb)
- Position: Defence
- Shoots: Left
- ZhHL team: Tornado Dmitrov
- National team: Russia
- Playing career: 2013–present
Medal record
Representing Russia
Women's ice hockey
World Championship
Bronze medal – third place	2016 Canada
Universiade
Gold medal – first place	2019 Krasnoyarsk	Ice hockey
Gold medal – first place	2017 Astana-Almaty	Ice hockey

Nina Borisovna Pirogova (Russian: Нина Борисовна Пирогова; born 26 January 1999) is a Russian ice hockey player and member of the Russian national team. She currently serves as an alternate captain of HC Tornado in the Zhenskaya Hockey League (ZhHL).

Pirogova represented Russia at the IIHF Women's World Championships in 2015, 2016, 2017, 2019, and 2021, winning a bronze medal at the 2016 tournament, and at the Winter Universiades in 2017 and 2019, winning gold medals at both tournaments. She participated in the women's ice hockey tournament at the 2018 Winter Olympics with the Olympic Athletes from Russia team. As a member of the Russian national under-18 team, she participated in four IIHF Women's U18 World Championships during 2014 to 2017, winning bronze medals at the 2015 and 2016 tournaments and serving as captain for the 2017 tournament.

At age 14, she made her debut in the Russian Championship league with HC Tornado and has remained with the team throughout the entirety of her club career, from the 2013–14 RWHL season to present.
