= Sergei Chistyakov =

Russian ice hockey player and coach

Sergei Chistyakov Сергей Чистяков
- Born: 3 May 1990 (age 34); Yekaterinburg, Russian SFSR, Soviet Union
- Height: 189 cm (6 ft 2 in)
- Weight: 79 kg (174 lb; 12 st 6 lb)
- Position: Forward
- Shot: Right
- Played for: Avtomobilist Yekaterinburg; Kazzinc-Torpedo; Sputnik Nizhny Tagil
- Current ZhHL coach: SKSO Yekaterinburg
- NHL draft: Undrafted
- Playing career: 2009–2015
- Coaching career: 2017–present

Sergei Nikolaevich Chistyakov (Russian: Сергей Николаевич Чистяков, romanized: Sergey Nikolayevich Chistyakov; born 3 May 1990) is a Russian retired ice hockey player and the current head coach of SKSO Yekaterinburg in the Zhenskaya Hockey League (ZhHL). A forward, he played with Avtomobilist Yekaterinburg of the Kontinental Hockey League (KHL) during the 2012–13 season.
