= Oksana Bratishcheva =

Russian ice hockey player (born 2000)

Oksana Bratishcheva Оксана Братищева
- Born: 5 June 2000 (age 26) Chelyabinsk, Russia
- Height: 1.65 m (5 ft 5 in)
- Weight: 54 kg (119 lb; 8 st 7 lb)
- Position: Centre
- Shoots: Left
- ZhHL team Former teams: Khimik Voskresensk: Sakhalin Yuzhno-Sakhalinsk; Dynamo-Neva St. Petersburg; SKIF Nizhny Novgorod
- National team: Russia
- Playing career: 2015–present

Oksana Aleksandrovna Bratishcheva (Russian: Оксана Александровна Братищева, also transliterated as Oxana Alexandrovna Bratisheva; born 5 June 2000) is a Russian ice hockey player and member of the Russian national ice hockey team. She has played with Khimik Voskresensk in the Zhenskaya Hockey League (ZhHL) since 2026.

Bratishcheva won the Russian Championship in 2024 with Dynamo-Neva Saint Petersburg and was selected to the ZhHL All-Star Game in 2019, 2023, and 2025.

== International career ==
As a youth player with the Russian national under-18 team, Bratishcheva participated in the Top Division tournament of the IIHF U18 Women's World Championship in 2017, where she was Russia's leading scorer and tied for tenth in scoring of all tournament skaters, with three goals and one assist in five games. Her efforts helped lead the team to a bronze medal victory and she was recognized by the coaches as a top-three player for Russia.

At the 2018 IIHF U18 Women's World Championship, she served as an alternate captain for Russia and was the team's top point earner once again, notching one goal and four assists in six games.

Bratishcheva represented Russia in the women's ice hockey tournament at the Krasnoyarsk 2019 edition of the Winter Universiade. Her five goals and eight points in seven games contributed to Russia's gold medal finish.

She made her IIHF Women's World Championship debut with the senior national team in 2019 and also participated in the 2021 tournament.

Under the banner of the Russian Olympic Committee, Bratishcheva played in the women's ice hockey tournament at the 2022 Winter Olympics in Beijing, where she recorded one assist across five games.
