= Landysh Falyakhova =

Russian ice hockey player

Landysh Falyakhova Ландыш Фаляхова
- Born: 31 August 1998 (age 28) Dva Polya Artash, Sabinsky District, Tatarstan, Russia
- Height: 158 cm (5 ft 2 in)
- Weight: 54 kg (119 lb; 8 st 7 lb)
- Position: Forward
- Shoots: Left
- ZhHL team Former teams: Torpedo Nizhny Novgorod; SKIF Nizhny Novgorod
- National team: Russia
- Playing career: 2013–present
Medal record
Universiade
Gold medal – first place	2019 Krasnoyarsk	Ice hockey

Landysh Ilsurovna Falyakhova (Russian: Ландыш Ильсуровна Фаляхова; born 31 August 1998) is a Russian ice hockey player and member of the Russian national team, currently serving as an alternate captain of Torpedo Nizhny Novgorod in the Zhenskaya Hockey League (ZhHL).

== Playing career ==
Falyakhova made her senior club debut with the secondary team of SKIF Nizhny Novgorod in the 2013–14 Russian Women's Hockey League season. She was selected to the ZhHL All-Star Games in 2019, 2020, and 2022.

=== International play ===
As a junior ice hockey player with the Russian national under-18 team, she participated in the IIHF U18 Women's World Championship tournaments in 2015 and 2016, winning a bronze medal in 2015.

Falyakhova won a gold medal with the Russian team in the women's ice hockey tournament at the 2019 Winter Universiade. She represented the Russian Olympic Committee at the 2021 IIHF Women's World Championship and in the women's ice hockey tournament at the 2022 Winter Olympics in Beijing.
