= Yelena Provorova =

Russian ice hockey player

Yelena Provorova Елена Проворова
- Born: November 22, 2001 (age 24) Nizhny Novgorod, Russia
- Height: 165 cm (5 ft 5 in)
- Weight: 58 kg (128 lb; 9 st 2 lb)
- Position: Defence
- Shoots: Left
- ZhHL team: SKIF Nizhny Novgorod
- National team: Russia
- Playing career: 2016–present
Medal record
Universiade
Gold medal – first place	2019 Krasnoyarsk	Ice hockey

Yelena Andreyevna Provorova (Russian: Елена Андреевна Проворова, also romanized as Elena Andreevna Provorova; born 22 November 2001) is a Russian ice hockey player and member of the Russian national ice hockey team, currently playing in the Zhenskaya Hockey League (ZhHL) with SKIF Nizhny Novgorod.

Provorova represented the Russian Olympic Committee at the 2021 IIHF Women's World Championship. She won a gold medal with the Russian team in the women's ice hockey tournament at the 2019 Winter Universiade. As a junior player with the Russian national under-18 team, she participated in the IIHF Women's U18 World Championship tournaments in 2017, 2018, and 2019, winning a bronze medal in 2017. At the 2018 and 2019 tournaments, she was selected by the coaches as one of the Russia's top three players.

Provorova made her senior club debut with SKIF Nizhny Novgorod in the 2016–17 ZhHL season and has played the entirety of her career with the club. She was selected to the ZhHL All-Star Game in 2020.
