= Viktoria Kulishova =

Russian ice hockey player

Viktoria Kulishova Виктория Кулишова
- Born: 12 August 1999 (age 27) Megion, Russia
- Height: 1.71 m (5 ft 7 in)
- Weight: 62 kg (137 lb; 9 st 11 lb)
- Position: Forward
- Shoots: Left
- ZhHL team Former teams: Agidel Ufa; Belye Medveditsy; SKIF Nizhny Novgorod
- National team: Russia
- Playing career: 2015–present
Medal record
Universiade
Gold medal – first place	2019 Krasnoyarsk	Ice hockey

Viktoria Igorevna Kulishova (Russian: Виктория Игоревна Кулишова; born 12 August 1999) is a Russian ice hockey player and member of the Russian national team. She has played with Agidel Ufa in the Zhenskaya Hockey League (ZhHL) since 2024.

== International play ==
Kulishova participated in the women‘s ice hockey tournament at the 2018 Winter Olympics with the Olympic Athletes from Russia team, represented Russia at the 2019 IIHF Women's World Championship and 2019 Winter Universiade, and represented the Russian Olympic Committee (ROC) at the 2021 IIHF Women's World Championship.
