= Angelina Goncharenko =

Russian ice hockey player (born 1994)

Angelina Goncharenko Ангелина Гончаренко
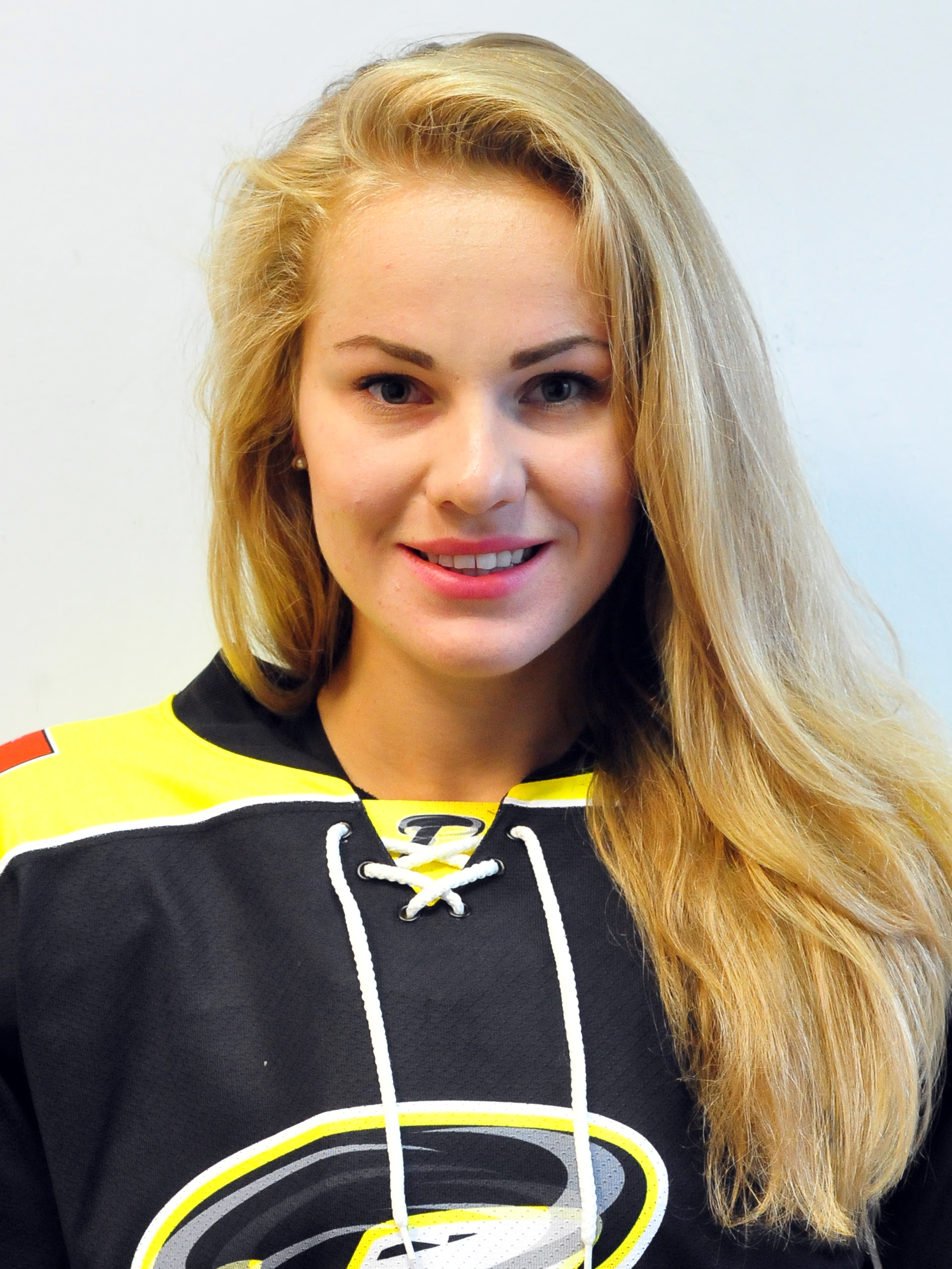
- Goncharenko with HC Tornado in 2015
- Born: 23 May 1994 (age 32) Moscow, Russia
- Height: 1.77 m (5 ft 10 in)
- Weight: 70 kg (154 lb; 11 st 0 lb)
- Position: Defense
- Shoots: Left
- ZhHL team Former teams: Torpedo Nizhny Novgorod: SKIF Nizhny Novgorod; Tornado Moscow Region; Agidel Ufa
- National team: Russia
- Playing career: 2011–present
Medal record
World Championship
| Bronze medal – third place | 2013 Canada |
| Bronze medal – third place | 2016 Canada |
Universiade
| Gold medal – first place | 2015 Granada | Ice hockey |
| Gold medal – first place | 2017 Astana-Almaty | Ice hockey |

Angelina Pavlovna Goncharenko (Russian: Ангелина Павловна Гончаренко; born 23 May 1994) is a Russian ice hockey defenseman and member of the Russian national team. She is captain of Torpedo Nizhny Novgorod in the Zhenskaya Hockey League (ZhHL).

== International career ==
Goncharenko was selected for the Russia women's national ice hockey team in the 2014 Winter Olympics. She played in all six games, not recording a point.

As of 2014, Goncharenko has also appeared for Russia at two IIHF Women's World Championships. Her first appearance came in 2012. She won a bronze medal as a part of the team in 2013.

Goncharenko made three appearances for the Russia women's national under-18 ice hockey team, at the IIHF World Women's U18 Championships, with the first in 2010.

== Career statistics ==
=== International career ===
Through 2013–14 season

| Year | Team | Event | GP | G | A | Pts | PIM |
|---|---|---|---|---|---|---|---|
| 2010 | Russia U18 | U18 | 5 | 0 | 0 | 0 | 6 |
| 2011 | Russia U18 | U18 DI | 5 | 1 | 2 | 3 | 4 |
| 2012 | Russia U18 | U18 | 6 | 0 | 1 | 1 | 0 |
| 2012 | Russia | WW | 6 | 1 | 0 | 1 | 6 |
| 2013 | Russia | WW | 6 | 0 | 0 | 0 | 2 |
| 2014 | Russia | Oly | 6 | 0 | 0 | 0 | 2 |
