= 2015 IIHF Women's World Championship rosters =

Each team's roster consisted of at least 15 skaters (forwards, and defencemen) and 2 goaltenders, and at most 20 skaters and 3 goaltenders. All eight participating nations, through the confirmation of their respective national associations, had to submit a roster by the first IIHF directorate.

Age and team as of 28 March 2015.

== Group A ==
=== Canada ===
The roster was announced on 12 March 2015. Caroline Ouellette replaced Haley Irwin, who was unable to participate through an injury, on 18 March 2015.

Head coach: Doug Derraugh

No.	Pos.	Name	Height	Weight	Birthdate	Team
3	D	Jocelyne Larocque	1.67 m (5 ft 6 in)	63 kg (139 lb)	May 19, 1988 (aged 26)	(Canada) Brampton CWHL
4	D	Brigette Lacquette	1.70 m (5 ft 7 in)	77 kg (170 lb)	November 10, 1992 (aged 22)	(United States) Univ. of Minnesota Duluth
5	D	Lauriane Rougeau – A	1.72 m (5 ft 8 in)	75 kg (165 lb)	April 12, 1990 (aged 24)	(Canada) Montreal Stars
6	F	Rebecca Johnston – A	1.75 m (5 ft 9 in)	66 kg (146 lb)	September 24, 1989 (aged 25)	(Canada) Calgary Inferno
7	F	Jamie Lee Rattray	1.68 m (5 ft 6 in)	78 kg (172 lb)	September 30, 1992 (aged 22)	(Canada) Brampton CWHL
8	D	Laura Fortino	1.62 m (5 ft 4 in)	65 kg (143 lb)	January 30, 1991 (aged 24)	(Canada) Brampton CWHL
9	F	Jenn Wakefield	1.77 m (5 ft 10 in)	75 kg (165 lb)	June 15, 1989 (aged 25)	(Sweden) IK Guts
11	F	Jillian Saulnier	1.65 m (5 ft 5 in)	65 kg (143 lb)	March 7, 1992 (aged 23)	(United States) Cornell University
13	F	Caroline Ouellette	1.80 m (5 ft 11 in)	78 kg (172 lb)	May 25, 1979 (aged 35)	(Canada) Montreal Stars
14	D	Courtney Birchard	1.75 m (5 ft 9 in)	68 kg (150 lb)	July 13, 1989 (aged 25)	(Canada) Brampton CWHL
17	F	Bailey Bram	1.70 m (5 ft 7 in)	67 kg (148 lb)	September 5, 1990 (aged 24)	(Canada) Calgary Inferno
19	F	Brianne Jenner	1.75 m (5 ft 9 in)	72 kg (159 lb)	May 1, 1991 (aged 23)	(United States) Cornell University
24	F	Natalie Spooner	1.75 m (5 ft 9 in)	84 kg (185 lb)	October 17, 1990 (aged 24)	(Canada) Toronto Furies
26	F	Jessica Campbell	1.65 m (5 ft 5 in)	62 kg (137 lb)	June 24, 1992 (aged 22)	(Canada) Calgary Inferno
27	D	Tara Watchorn	1.75 m (5 ft 9 in)	80 kg (180 lb)	May 30, 1990 (aged 24)	(United States) Boston Blades
29	F	Marie-Philip Poulin – C	1.67 m (5 ft 6 in)	72 kg (159 lb)	March 28, 1991 (aged 24)	(United States) Boston Univ.
30	G	Emerance Maschmeyer	1.68 m (5 ft 6 in)	64 kg (141 lb)	October 5, 1994 (aged 20)	(United States) Harvard Univ.
31	G	Geneviève Lacasse	1.72 m (5 ft 8 in)	67 kg (148 lb)	May 5, 1989 (aged 25)	(United States) Boston Blades
33	G	Ann-Renée Desbiens	1.75 m (5 ft 9 in)	73 kg (161 lb)	April 10, 1994 (aged 20)	(United States) Univ. of Wisconsin
37	F	Sarah Davis	1.63 m (5 ft 4 in)	76 kg (168 lb)	June 23, 1992 (aged 22)	(Canada) Calgary Inferno
38	D	Halli Krzyzaniak	1.70 m (5 ft 7 in)	73 kg (161 lb)	February 4, 1995 (aged 20)	(United States) Univ. of North Dakota
39	F	Emily Clark	1.70 m (5 ft 7 in)	59 kg (130 lb)	November 28, 1995 (aged 19)	(United States) Univ. of Wisconsin
41	F	Kelly Terry	1.68 m (5 ft 6 in)	64 kg (141 lb)	June 6, 1992 (aged 22)	(Canada) Toronto Furies

=== Finland ===
A 24-player roster was announced on 16 March 2015. The final roster was named on 24 March 2015.

Head coach: Pasi Mustonen

No.	Pos.	Name	Height	Weight	Birthdate	Team
1	G	Eveliina Suonpää	1.73 m (5 ft 8 in)	65 kg (143 lb)	April 12, 1995 (aged 19)	(United States) Univ. of Minnesota Duluth
2	D	Eve Savander	1.66 m (5 ft 5 in)	67 kg (148 lb)	September 2, 1998 (aged 16)	(Finland) Team Kuortane
4	D	Rosa Lindstedt	1.86 m (6 ft 1 in)	79 kg (174 lb)	January 24, 1988 (aged 27)	(Finland) JYP Jyväskylä
5	D	Anna Kilponen	1.69 m (5 ft 7 in)	74 kg (163 lb)	May 16, 1995 (aged 19)	(Finland) Ilves
6	D	Jenni Hiirikoski – C	1.62 m (5 ft 4 in)	60 kg (130 lb)	March 30, 1987 (aged 27)	(Finland) JYP Jyväskylä
7	D	Mira Jalosuo	1.84 m (6 ft 0 in)	84 kg (185 lb)	February 3, 1989 (aged 26)	(Russia) Nizhni Novgorod
8	D	Ronja Savolainen	1.70 m (5 ft 7 in)	57 kg (126 lb)	November 29, 1997 (aged 17)	(Finland) Espoo Blues
9	F	Jennica Haikarainen	1.74 m (5 ft 9 in)	75 kg (165 lb)	August 1, 1989 (aged 25)	(Sweden) Modo Hockey
10	F	Linda Välimäki	1.66 m (5 ft 5 in)	70 kg (150 lb)	May 31, 1990 (aged 24)	(Finland) Espoo Blues
13	F	Riikka Nieminen – A	1.63 m (5 ft 4 in)	60 kg (130 lb)	June 12, 1973 (aged 41)	(Finland) JYP Jyväskylä
14	F	Niina Mäkinen	1.70 m (5 ft 7 in)	60 kg (130 lb)	April 18, 1992 (aged 22)	(Finland) Oulun Kärpät
15	D	Minttu Tuominen	1.65 m (5 ft 5 in)	74 kg (163 lb)	January 26, 1990 (aged 25)	(Finland) Espoo Blues
16	F	Vilma Tanskanen	1.75 m (5 ft 9 in)	68 kg (150 lb)	April 14, 1995 (aged 19)	(Finland) Espoo Blues
18	G	Meeri Räisänen	1.70 m (5 ft 7 in)	67 kg (148 lb)	December 2, 1989 (aged 25)	(Russia) Nizhni Novgorod
20	F	Sari Kärnä	1.64 m (5 ft 5 in)	59 kg (130 lb)	April 2, 1988 (aged 26)	(Finland) Ilves
21	F	Michelle Karvinen – A	1.66 m (5 ft 5 in)	69 kg (152 lb)	March 27, 1990 (aged 25)	(Finland) Espoo Blues
24	F	Noora Tulus	1.65 m (5 ft 5 in)	65 kg (143 lb)	August 15, 1995 (aged 19)	(Finland) Espoo Blues
25	F	Suvi Ollikainen	1.63 m (5 ft 4 in)	64 kg (141 lb)	March 6, 1995 (aged 20)	(Finland) HC Keski-Uusimaa
27	F	Saila Saari	1.70 m (5 ft 7 in)	63 kg (139 lb)	November 1, 1989 (aged 25)	(Finland) JYP Jyväskylä
29	F	Karoliina Rantamäki	1.63 m (5 ft 4 in)	65 kg (143 lb)	February 23, 1978 (aged 37)	(Russia) Nizhni Novgorod
31	G	Vilma Vaattovaara	1.71 m (5 ft 7 in)	68 kg (150 lb)	March 10, 1993 (aged 22)	(United States) Univ. of New Hampshire
77	F	Susanna Tapani	1.77 m (5 ft 10 in)	65 kg (143 lb)	March 2, 1993 (aged 22)	(Finland) HPK
96	F	Emma Nuutinen	1.76 m (5 ft 9 in)	74 kg (163 lb)	December 7, 1996 (aged 18)	(Finland) Espoo Blues

=== Russia ===
A 30-player roster was announced on 11 March 2015, while the final roster was named on 21 March 2015.

Head coach: Mikhail Chekanov

No.	Pos.	Name	Height	Weight	Birthdate	Team
1	G	Valeria Tarakanova	1.83 m (6 ft 0 in)	83 kg (183 lb)	June 20, 1998 (aged 16)	(Russia) Nizhni Novgorod
2	D	Angelina Goncharenko	1.77 m (5 ft 10 in)	69 kg (152 lb)	May 23, 1994 (aged 20)	(Russia) Tornado Moscow
3	F	Fanuza Kadirova	1.62 m (5 ft 4 in)	64 kg (141 lb)	April 6, 1998 (aged 16)	(Russia) Arktik-Univ. Ukhta
4	D	Maria Pechnikova	1.78 m (5 ft 10 in)	60 kg (130 lb)	June 8, 1992 (aged 22)	(Russia) Nizhni Novgorod
7	F	Yevgenia Dyupina	1.70 m (5 ft 7 in)	58 kg (128 lb)	June 30, 1994 (aged 20)	(Russia) HC St. Petersburg
8	F	Iya Gavrilova – A	1.72 m (5 ft 8 in)	66 kg (146 lb)	September 3, 1987 (aged 27)	(Canada) Univ. of Calgary
9	F	Alexandra Vafina	1.63 m (5 ft 4 in)	59 kg (130 lb)	July 28, 1990 (aged 24)	(Canada) Univ. of Calgary
10	F	Liudmila Belyakova	1.70 m (5 ft 7 in)	64 kg (141 lb)	August 12, 1994 (aged 20)	(Russia) Tornado Moscow
13	D	Nina Pirogova	1.71 m (5 ft 7 in)	70 kg (150 lb)	January 26, 1999 (aged 16)	(Russia) Tornado Moscow
15	F	Valeria Pavlova	1.78 m (5 ft 10 in)	77 kg (170 lb)	April 15, 1995 (aged 19)	(Russia) Biryusa Krasnoyarsk
16	F	Yelena Silina	1.63 m (5 ft 4 in)	56 kg (123 lb)	June 20, 1987 (aged 27)	(Russia) Nizhni Novgorod
18	F	Olga Sosina	1.67 m (5 ft 6 in)	67 kg (148 lb)	July 27, 1992 (aged 22)	(Russia) Nizhni Novgorod
21	D	Anna Shukina – C	1.71 m (5 ft 7 in)	79 kg (174 lb)	November 5, 1987 (aged 27)	(Russia) Tornado Moscow
23	F	Tatiana Burina	1.63 m (5 ft 4 in)	66 kg (146 lb)	March 20, 1980 (aged 35)	(Russia) Tornado Moscow
26	F	Yelena Dergachyova	1.59 m (5 ft 3 in)	57 kg (126 lb)	November 8, 1995 (aged 19)	(Russia) Tornado Moscow
31	G	Yulia Leskina	1.78 m (5 ft 10 in)	76 kg (168 lb)	February 9, 1991 (aged 24)	(Russia) Spartak Yekaterinburg
33	G	Maria Sorokina	1.65 m (5 ft 5 in)	58 kg (128 lb)	August 19, 1995 (aged 19)	(Russia) HC St. Petersburg
34	D	Svetlana Tkacheva	1.70 m (5 ft 7 in)	68 kg (150 lb)	November 3, 1984 (aged 30)	(Russia) Tornado Moscow
44	D	Alexandra Kapustina – A	1.68 m (5 ft 6 in)	73 kg (161 lb)	April 7, 1984 (aged 30)	(Russia) Nizhni Novgorod
55	F	Galina Skiba	1.63 m (5 ft 4 in)	66 kg (146 lb)	May 9, 1984 (aged 30)	(Russia) Tornado Moscow
68	F	Tatyana Shibanova	1.63 m (5 ft 4 in)	66 kg (146 lb)	October 10, 1994 (aged 20)	(Russia) HC Agidel Ufa
70	D	Anna Shibanova	1.62 m (5 ft 4 in)	62 kg (137 lb)	November 10, 1994 (aged 20)	(Russia) HC Agidel Ufa
88	F	Yekaterina Smolina	1.62 m (5 ft 4 in)	58 kg (128 lb)	October 8, 1988 (aged 26)	(Russia) Tornado Moscow

=== United States ===
The roster was announced on 15 February 2015.

Head coach: Ken Klee

No.	Pos.	Name	Height	Weight	Birthdate	Team
2	D	Lee Stecklein	1.83 m (6 ft 0 in)	77 kg (170 lb)	April 23, 1994 (aged 20)	(United States) Univ. of Minnesota
5	D	Megan Keller	1.78 m (5 ft 10 in)	68 kg (150 lb)	May 1, 1996 (aged 18)	(United States) Boston College
7	D	Monique Lamoureux-Kolls	1.68 m (5 ft 6 in)	70 kg (150 lb)	July 3, 1989 (aged 25)	(United States) Boston Blades
8	D	Emily Pfalzer	1.58 m (5 ft 2 in)	57 kg (126 lb)	June 14, 1993 (aged 21)	(United States) Boston College
10	F	Meghan Duggan – C	1.78 m (5 ft 10 in)	77 kg (170 lb)	September 3, 1987 (aged 27)	(United States) Boston Blades
11	F	Haley Skarupa	1.68 m (5 ft 6 in)	64 kg (141 lb)	January 3, 1994 (aged 21)	(United States) Boston College
14	F	Brianna Decker – A	1.63 m (5 ft 4 in)	67 kg (148 lb)	May 13, 1991 (aged 23)	(United States) Boston Blades
15	D	Anne Schleper	1.78 m (5 ft 10 in)	77 kg (170 lb)	January 30, 1990 (aged 25)	Free agent
17	F	Jocelyne Lamoureux	1.68 m (5 ft 6 in)	70 kg (150 lb)	July 3, 1989 (aged 25)	Free agent
18	F	Stephanie Anderson	1.75 m (5 ft 9 in)	75 kg (165 lb)	November 27, 1992 (aged 22)	(United States) Bemidji State Univ.
20	F	Hannah Brandt	1.68 m (5 ft 6 in)	68 kg (150 lb)	November 27, 1993 (aged 21)	(United States) Univ. of Minnesota
21	F	Hilary Knight	1.80 m (5 ft 11 in)	78 kg (172 lb)	July 12, 1989 (aged 25)	(United States) Boston Blades
22	D	Kacey Bellamy	1.70 m (5 ft 7 in)	66 kg (146 lb)	April 22, 1987 (aged 27)	(United States) Boston Blades
23	D	Michelle Picard	1.63 m (5 ft 4 in)	68 kg (150 lb)	May 27, 1993 (aged 21)	(United States) Harvard Univ.
24	F	Dani Cameranesi	1.65 m (5 ft 5 in)	66 kg (146 lb)	June 30, 1995 (aged 19)	(United States) Univ. of Minnesota
25	F	Alexandra Carpenter – A	1.70 m (5 ft 7 in)	70 kg (150 lb)	April 13, 1994 (aged 20)	(United States) Boston College
26	F	Kendall Coyne	1.58 m (5 ft 2 in)	57 kg (126 lb)	May 25, 1992 (aged 22)	(United States) Northeastern Univ.
27	F	Annie Pankowski	1.73 m (5 ft 8 in)	70 kg (150 lb)	November 4, 1994 (aged 20)	(United States) Univ. of Wisconsin
30	G	Molly Schaus	1.75 m (5 ft 9 in)	71 kg (157 lb)	July 29, 1988 (aged 26)	Free agent
31	G	Jessica Vetter	1.73 m (5 ft 8 in)	70 kg (150 lb)	December 19, 1985 (aged 29)	Free agent
32	F	Dana Trivigno	1.63 m (5 ft 4 in)	61 kg (134 lb)	January 7, 1994 (aged 21)	(United States) Boston College
33	G	Alex Rigsby	1.70 m (5 ft 7 in)	70 kg (150 lb)	January 3, 1992 (aged 23)	Free agent
36	F	Zoe Hickel	1.68 m (5 ft 6 in)	69 kg (152 lb)	July 10, 1992 (aged 22)	(United States) Univ. of Minnesota Duluth

== Group B ==
=== Germany ===
A 26-player roster was announced on 11 March 2015. The final roster was revealed on 24 March 2015.

Head coach: Benjamin Hinterstocker

No.	Pos.	Name	Height	Weight	Birthdate	Team
1	G	Ivonne Schröder	1.78 m (5 ft 10 in)	70 kg (150 lb)	July 25, 1988 (aged 26)	(Germany) Tornado Niesky
2	F	Julia Seitz	1.74 m (5 ft 9 in)	67 kg (148 lb)	February 14, 1994 (aged 21)	(Germany) ECDC Memmingen
5	F	Eva Byszio	1.65 m (5 ft 5 in)	57 kg (126 lb)	May 25, 1993 (aged 21)	(Germany) ERC Ingolstadt
7	F	Nina Kamenik	1.61 m (5 ft 3 in)	56 kg (123 lb)	April 27, 1985 (aged 29)	(Germany) OSC Berlin
8	F	Julia Zorn – C	1.70 m (5 ft 7 in)	73 kg (161 lb)	February 6, 1990 (aged 25)	(Germany) ESC Planegg
9	D	Rebecca Graeve	1.65 m (5 ft 5 in)	65 kg (143 lb)	April 28, 1993 (aged 21)	(Germany) EC Bergkamen
10	D	Yvonne Rothemund	1.80 m (5 ft 11 in)	80 kg (180 lb)	September 23, 1992 (aged 22)	(Germany) ESC Planegg
11	F	Nicola Eisenschmid	1.66 m (5 ft 5 in)	63 kg (139 lb)	September 10, 1996 (aged 18)	(Germany) ECDC Memmingen
12	D	Anna-Marie Fiegert	1.73 m (5 ft 8 in)	70 kg (150 lb)	April 3, 1994 (aged 20)	(United States) Minnesota State
13	D	Carina Strobel	1.76 m (5 ft 9 in)	56 kg (123 lb)	September 10, 1997 (aged 17)	(Germany) ECDC Memmingen
15	F	Andrea Lanzl – A	1.63 m (5 ft 4 in)	68 kg (150 lb)	October 8, 1987 (aged 27)	(Germany) ERC Ingolstadt
17	D	Lena Düsterhöft	1.77 m (5 ft 10 in)	72 kg (159 lb)	August 26, 1996 (aged 18)	(Germany) EHC Klostersee
18	F	Bernadette Karpf	1.67 m (5 ft 6 in)	63 kg (139 lb)	July 3, 1996 (aged 18)	(Germany) TSV Erding
19	F	Kerstin Spielberger	1.68 m (5 ft 6 in)	62 kg (137 lb)	December 14, 1995 (aged 19)	(Germany) ESC Planegg
20	D	Daria Gleissner – A	1.70 m (5 ft 7 in)	69 kg (152 lb)	June 30, 1993 (aged 21)	(Germany) ECDC Memmingen
22	F	Marie Delarbre	1.70 m (5 ft 7 in)	93 kg (205 lb)	January 20, 1994 (aged 21)	(United States) Merrimack Warriors
23	D	Tanja Eisenschmid	1.71 m (5 ft 7 in)	63 kg (139 lb)	April 20, 1993 (aged 21)	(United States) Univ. of North Dakota
24	F	Lisa Schuster	1.69 m (5 ft 7 in)	70 kg (150 lb)	May 28, 1987 (aged 27)	(Germany) OSC Berlin
25	F	Laura Kluge	1.78 m (5 ft 10 in)	54 kg (119 lb)	November 6, 1996 (aged 18)	(Germany) OSC Berlin
26	F	Monika Bittner	1.56 m (5 ft 1 in)	60 kg (130 lb)	January 29, 1988 (aged 27)	(Germany) ESC Planegg
27	G	Franziska Albl	1.67 m (5 ft 6 in)	66 kg (146 lb)	April 29, 1995 (aged 19)	(Germany) ECDC Memmingen
29	D	Anne Bartsch	1.64 m (5 ft 5 in)	62 kg (137 lb)	September 22, 1995 (aged 19)	(Germany) OSC Berlin
30	G	Jennifer Harß	1.75 m (5 ft 9 in)	65 kg (143 lb)	July 14, 1987 (aged 27)	(Germany) ERC Sonthofen

=== Japan ===
The roster was announced on 11 March 2015.

Head coach: Yoshifumi Fujisawa

No.	Pos.	Name	Height	Weight	Birthdate	Team
1	G	Nana Fujimoto	1.63 m (5 ft 4 in)	54 kg (119 lb)	March 3, 1989 (aged 26)	(Japan) Vortex Sapporo
2	D	Shiori Koike	1.59 m (5 ft 3 in)	52 kg (115 lb)	March 21, 1993 (aged 22)	(Japan) Daito Perigrine
3	D	Rina Takeda	1.71 m (5 ft 7 in)	67 kg (148 lb)	January 16, 1993 (aged 22)	(Japan) Mikage Gretz
4	D	Ayaka Toko	1.61 m (5 ft 3 in)	58 kg (128 lb)	August 22, 1994 (aged 20)	(Japan) Seibu Rabbits
5	D	Kanae Aoki	1.65 m (5 ft 5 in)	60 kg (130 lb)	February 20, 1985 (aged 30)	(Japan) Daito Perigrine
6	D	Sena Suzuki	1.67 m (5 ft 6 in)	58 kg (128 lb)	August 4, 1991 (aged 23)	(Japan) Seibu Rabbits
7	D	Mika Hori	1.63 m (5 ft 4 in)	53 kg (117 lb)	February 17, 1992 (aged 23)	(Japan) Toyota Cygnus
8	D	Riko Yamaya	1.62 m (5 ft 4 in)	60 kg (130 lb)	November 27, 1995 (aged 19)	(Japan) Daito Perigrine
10	F	Haruna Yoneyama	1.60 m (5 ft 3 in)	55 kg (121 lb)	November 7, 1991 (aged 23)	(Japan) Daito Perigrine
11	F	Yurie Adachi	1.56 m (5 ft 1 in)	51 kg (112 lb)	April 26, 1985 (aged 29)	(Japan) Seibu Rabbits
12	F	Chiho Osawa – C	1.62 m (5 ft 4 in)	64 kg (141 lb)	February 10, 1992 (aged 23)	(Japan) Daito Perigrine
14	F	Haruka Toko	1.64 m (5 ft 5 in)	56 kg (123 lb)	March 16, 1997 (aged 18)	(Japan) Seibu Rabbits
15	F	Rui Ukita	1.68 m (5 ft 6 in)	71 kg (157 lb)	June 6, 1996 (aged 18)	(Japan) Daishin HC
16	F	Naho Terashima	1.57 m (5 ft 2 in)	56 kg (123 lb)	May 2, 1993 (aged 21)	(Japan) Daishin HC
17	F	Yuka Hirano – A	1.57 m (5 ft 2 in)	52 kg (115 lb)	January 26, 1987 (aged 28)	(Sweden) AIK IF
18	F	Suzuka Taka	1.60 m (5 ft 3 in)	51 kg (112 lb)	October 16, 1996 (aged 18)	(Japan) Daito Perigrine
19	F	Miho Shishiuchi	1.64 m (5 ft 5 in)	62 kg (137 lb)	August 21, 1992 (aged 22)	(Finland) HPK
20	G	Yuri Komura	1.56 m (5 ft 1 in)	52 kg (115 lb)	January 30, 1992 (aged 23)	(Japan) Toyota Cygnus
21	F	Hanae Kubo – A	1.68 m (5 ft 6 in)	63 kg (139 lb)	December 10, 1982 (aged 32)	(Japan) Seibu Rabbits
22	F	Tomomi Iwahara	1.61 m (5 ft 3 in)	61 kg (134 lb)	December 19, 1987 (aged 27)	(Japan) Seibu Rabbits
23	F	Ami Nakamura	1.62 m (5 ft 4 in)	63 kg (139 lb)	November 15, 1987 (aged 27)	(Japan) Seibu Rabbits
25	D	Yukiko Kawashima	1.64 m (5 ft 5 in)	62 kg (137 lb)	November 16, 1996 (aged 18)	(Japan) Daito Perigrine
29	G	Mai Kondo	1.65 m (5 ft 5 in)	54 kg (119 lb)	April 4, 1992 (aged 22)	(Japan) Mikage Gretz

=== Sweden ===
A 39-player roster was announced on 10 March 2015 which was trimmed to 24 on 17 March 2015.

Head coach: Leif Boork

No.	Pos.	Name	Height	Weight	Birthdate	Team
1	G	Sara Grahn	1.70 m (5 ft 7 in)	70 kg (150 lb)	September 25, 1988 (aged 26)	(Sweden) Brynäs IF
2	D	Emmy Alasalmi	1.61 m (5 ft 3 in)	65 kg (143 lb)	January 17, 1994 (aged 21)	(Sweden) AIK IF
4	F	Jenni Asserholt – C	1.72 m (5 ft 8 in)	71 kg (157 lb)	April 8, 1988 (aged 26)	(Sweden) Linkopings HC
5	D	Johanna Fällman	1.73 m (5 ft 8 in)	70 kg (150 lb)	June 21, 1990 (aged 24)	(United States) Univ. of North Dakota
6	D	Lina Bäcklin	1.69 m (5 ft 7 in)	67 kg (148 lb)	October 3, 1994 (aged 20)	(Sweden) Brynäs IF
7	D	Johanna Olofsson	1.69 m (5 ft 7 in)	66 kg (146 lb)	July 13, 1991 (aged 23)	(Sweden) Modo Hockey
8	D	Annie Svedin – A	1.63 m (5 ft 4 in)	68 kg (150 lb)	October 12, 1991 (aged 23)	(Sweden) IF Sundsvall
10	D	Emilia Andersson	1.75 m (5 ft 9 in)	70 kg (150 lb)	August 31, 1988 (aged 26)	(Sweden) Linkopings HC
13	F	Lina Wester	1.70 m (5 ft 7 in)	58 kg (128 lb)	November 7, 1992 (aged 22)	(Sweden) Leksands IF
14	F	Sabina Küller	1.76 m (5 ft 9 in)	68 kg (150 lb)	September 22, 1994 (aged 20)	(Sweden) AIK IF
16	F	Pernilla Winberg	1.65 m (5 ft 5 in)	65 kg (143 lb)	February 24, 1989 (aged 26)	(Sweden) Linkopings HC
17	D	Linnea Bäckman	1.66 m (5 ft 5 in)	67 kg (148 lb)	April 18, 1991 (aged 23)	(Sweden) AIK IF
18	F	Anna Borgqvist	1.63 m (5 ft 4 in)	63 kg (139 lb)	June 11, 1992 (aged 22)	(Sweden) Brynäs IF
19	F	Maria Lindh	1.76 m (5 ft 9 in)	63 kg (139 lb)	September 23, 1993 (aged 21)	(United States) Univ. of Minnesota Duluth
21	F	Erica Udén Johansson	1.71 m (5 ft 7 in)	76 kg (168 lb)	July 20, 1989 (aged 25)	(United States) Quinnipiac Univ.
23	F	Lisa Hedengren	1.72 m (5 ft 8 in)	78 kg (172 lb)	February 14, 1992 (aged 23)	(Sweden) AIK IF
24	F	Erika Grahm – A	1.74 m (5 ft 9 in)	74 kg (163 lb)	January 26, 1991 (aged 24)	(Sweden) Modo Hockey
26	F	Hanna Olsson	1.71 m (5 ft 7 in)	67 kg (148 lb)	January 20, 1999 (aged 16)	(Sweden) Skärgården Hockey
27	F	Emma Nordin	1.68 m (5 ft 6 in)	71 kg (157 lb)	March 22, 1991 (aged 24)	(Sweden) Modo Hockey
28	F	Michelle Löwenhielm	1.72 m (5 ft 8 in)	67 kg (148 lb)	March 22, 1995 (aged 20)	(United States) Univ. of Minnesota Duluth
29	F	Olivia Carlsson	1.74 m (5 ft 9 in)	70 kg (150 lb)	March 2, 1995 (aged 20)	(Sweden) Modo Hockey
30	G	Kim Martin Hasson	1.66 m (5 ft 5 in)	71 kg (157 lb)	February 28, 1986 (aged 29)	(Sweden) Linkopings HC
35	G	Valentina Wallner	1.70 m (5 ft 7 in)	65 kg (143 lb)	March 30, 1990 (aged 24)	(Sweden) Djurgårdens IF

=== Switzerland ===
A first roster was announced on 4 February 2015, which was trimmed to 26on 17 March 2015. The final roster was named on 26 March 2015.

Head coach: Gian-Marco Crameri

No.	Pos.	Name	Height	Weight	Birthdate	Team
1	G	Janine Alder	1.65 m (5 ft 5 in)	55 kg (121 lb)	July 5, 1995 (aged 19)	(Switzerland) EHC Winterthur
2	D	Céline Abgottspon	1.73 m (5 ft 8 in)	76 kg (168 lb)	November 24, 1995 (aged 19)	(Switzerland) HC Lugano
3	D	Sarah Forster – A	1.69 m (5 ft 7 in)	64 kg (141 lb)	March 19, 1993 (aged 22)	(Sweden) Linkopings HC
6	D	Julia Marty – C	1.69 m (5 ft 7 in)	69 kg (152 lb)	April 16, 1988 (aged 26)	(Switzerland) SC Reinach
7	F	Lara Stalder	1.67 m (5 ft 6 in)	65 kg (143 lb)	May 15, 1994 (aged 20)	(United States) Univ. of Minnesota Duluth
9	F	Stefanie Marty	1.67 m (5 ft 6 in)	70 kg (150 lb)	April 16, 1988 (aged 26)	(Sweden) Linkopings HC
10	D	Reica Staiger	1.63 m (5 ft 4 in)	63 kg (139 lb)	November 8, 1996 (aged 18)	(Switzerland) EHC Winterthur
11	D	Sabrina Zollinger	1.65 m (5 ft 5 in)	65 kg (143 lb)	March 27, 1993 (aged 22)	(Switzerland) ZSC Lions
14	F	Romy Eggimann	1.58 m (5 ft 2 in)	57 kg (126 lb)	September 29, 1995 (aged 19)	(Switzerland) HC Lugano
15	F	Monika Waidacher	1.72 m (5 ft 8 in)	70 kg (150 lb)	July 9, 1990 (aged 24)	(Switzerland) ZSC Lions
16	F	Nina Waidacher	1.70 m (5 ft 7 in)	65 kg (143 lb)	August 23, 1992 (aged 22)	(United States) College of St. Scholastica
18	F	Evelina Raselli – A	1.69 m (5 ft 7 in)	63 kg (139 lb)	May 3, 1992 (aged 22)	(Switzerland) HC Lugano
21	D	Laura Benz	1.72 m (5 ft 8 in)	63 kg (139 lb)	August 25, 1992 (aged 22)	(Switzerland) ZSC Lions
22	D	Livia Altmann	1.65 m (5 ft 5 in)	65 kg (143 lb)	December 13, 1994 (aged 20)	(Switzerland) ZSC Lions
24	D	Shannon Sigrist	1.67 m (5 ft 6 in)	62 kg (137 lb)	April 20, 1999 (aged 15)	(Switzerland) GCK Lions
25	F	Alina Müller	1.65 m (5 ft 5 in)	54 kg (119 lb)	March 12, 1998 (aged 17)	(Switzerland) Kloten Flyers
26	F	Dominique Rüegg	1.72 m (5 ft 8 in)	70 kg (150 lb)	February 5, 1996 (aged 19)	(Switzerland) EHC Uzwil
30	G	Sandra Heim	1.65 m (5 ft 5 in)	56 kg (123 lb)	June 25, 1995 (aged 19)	(Switzerland) EV Bomo Thun
41	G	Florence Schelling	1.75 m (5 ft 9 in)	65 kg (143 lb)	March 9, 1989 (aged 26)	(Switzerland) EHC Bülach
51	F	Laura Trachsel	1.61 m (5 ft 3 in)	65 kg (143 lb)	January 16, 1994 (aged 21)	(Switzerland) SC Weinfelden
63	F	Anja Stiefel	1.60 m (5 ft 3 in)	62 kg (137 lb)	August 9, 1990 (aged 24)	(Switzerland) HC Lugano
88	F	Phoebe Staenz	1.63 m (5 ft 4 in)	62 kg (137 lb)	January 7, 1994 (aged 21)	(United States) Yale Univ.
92	D	Sandra Thalmann	1.63 m (5 ft 4 in)	71 kg (157 lb)	December 18, 1992 (aged 22)	(Switzerland) SC Reinach
