= 2011 IIHF World Women's U18 Championship =

Tournament details
- Host country: Sweden
- Venue(s): Stora Mossen, Husby Ishall (in 1 host city)
- Dates: 1–8 January 2011
- Teams: 8

Final positions
- Champions: United States (3rd title)
- Runners-up: Canada
- Third place: Finland
- Fourth place: Czech Republic

Tournament statistics
- Games played: 22
- Goals scored: 138 (6.27 per game)
- Attendance: 3,146 (143 per game)
- Scoring leader: (United States) Alex Carpenter (10 points)

The 2011 IIHF World Women's U18 Championship was the fourth junior female world ice hockey championships. It was held from 1 January through 8 January 2011, in Stockholm, Sweden. The championship was the Under-18 junior ice hockey edition of the women worlds, organized by the International Ice Hockey Federation (IIHF).

== Top Division ==
=== Group stage ===
==== Group A ====
Team	Pld	W	OTW	OTL	L	GF	GA	GD	Pts	Qualification
Canada	3	3	0	0	0	23	2	+21	9	Semifinals
Germany	3	2	0	0	1	6	10	−4	6	Quarterfinals
Finland	3	1	0	0	2	4	8	−4	3	Quarterfinals
Switzerland	3	0	0	0	3	4	17	−13	0	Relegation Round

Source: IIHF

All times local (CET/UTC+1)

1 January 2011; 15:00	Canada	9–1 (2–0, 3–1, 4–0)	Switzerland	Husby Ishall; Attendance: 122

Game reference

Amanda Makela
Goalies
Sandra Heim
Referee:
(Netherlands) Debby Hengst

R. Kohler (S. Edney, C. Mercer) (PP) – 05:43	1–0
S. Bram (M. Dufault, N. Kosta) (PP) – 19:24	2–0
R. Kohler – 27:07	3–0
M. Dufault (N. Kosta) – 28:02	4–0
	4–1	28:21 – P. Stänz (L. Stalder)
C. Mercer (R. Kohler, E. Fulton) – 36:29	5–1
S. Robson (K. Josephs) – 44:08	6–1
M. Dufault (SH) – 47:19	7–1
K. Josephs – 53:27	8–1
E. Fulton (C. Mercer) – 55:29	9–1

10 min
Penalties
10 min
59
Shots
25

1 January 2011; 18:30	Germany	1–0 (0–0, 1–0, 0–0)	Finland	Husby Ishall; Attendance: 61

Game reference
Nadja Gruber	Goalies	Isabella Portnoj	Referee: (Canada) Sylena Mutsaers
E. Byszio (K-L Engel) – 39:52 / 1–0			Referee: (Canada) Sylena Mutsaers
10 min	Penalties	33 min	Referee: (Canada) Sylena Mutsaers
24	Shots	28	Referee: (Canada) Sylena Mutsaers

2 January 2011; 15:00	Germany	4–2 (3–0, 0–0, 1–2)	Switzerland	Husby Ishall; Attendance: 104

Game reference

Nadja Gruber
Goalies
Sandra Heim
Referee:
(United States) Kristine Langley

J. Janzen – 02:35	1–0
K. Port (K-L. Engel, D. Gleissner) – 07:19	2–0
J. Janzen (T. Fritz) – 10:17	3–0
	3–1	45:26 – L. Kamber (J. Bigler)
	3–2	59:11 – L. Stadler (I. Waidacher) (PP)
J. Janzen (ENG) – 59:38	4–2

8 min
Penalties
10 min
22
Shots
32

2 January 2011; 18:30	Finland	0–6 (0–2, 0–2, 0–2)	Canada	Husby Ishall; Attendance: 166

Game reference

Isabella Portnoj
Goalies
Ann-Renee Desbiens
Referee:
(Sweden) Malin Axelsson

0–1	05:34 – S. Robson (K. Josephs, J. Shields)
0–2	07:58 – L. Stacey (J. Shields, S. Edney) (PP2)
0–3	32:15 – K. Zgraja (G. Davidson) (PP)
0–4	34:52 – L. Stacey (S. MacDonnell)
0–5	49:10 – G. Davidson (L. Stacey) (PP)
0–6	58:28 – N. Kosta (M. Dufault) (PP)

22 min
Penalties
6 min
10
Shots
59

4 January 2011; 15:00	Switzerland	1–4 (1–2, 0–0, 0–2)	Finland	Husby Ishall; Attendance: 93

Game reference

Sandra Heim
Tamara Klossner
Goalies
Isabella Portnoj
Referee:
(Russia) Arina Ustinova

	0–1	00:18 – S. Valkama
	0–2	02:18 – A. Rantanen (SH)
P. Stanz (PS) – 17:09	1–2
	1–3	43:29 – S. Tapani
	1–4	54:06 – S. Tapani (SH)

16 min
Penalties
22 min
27
Shots
42

4 January 2011; 18:30	Canada	8–1 (1–0, 4–0, 3–1)	Germany	Husby Ishall; Attendance: 117

Game reference

Amanda Makela
Goalies
Franziska Albi
Referee:
(Czech Republic) Radka Ruzickova

N. Kosta (M. Dufault, G. Repaci) – 00:54	1–0
S. MacDonnell (C. Roesler) (PP) – 21:22	2–0
R. Robson (G. Davidson) – 28:24	3–0
L. Stacey (C. Roesler, S. MacDonnell) (PP) – 31:05	4–0
N. Kosta (S. Bram, M. Dufault) – 34:15	5–0
S. Edney (C. Roesler) (PP) – 44:04	6–0
	6–1	52:07 – J. Janzen (R. Graeve) (PP)
N. Kosta – 57:28	7–1
S. MacDonnell (L. Stacey) (PP) – 58:19	8–1

12 min
Penalties
22 min
75
Shots
12

==== Group B ====
Team	Pld	W	OTW	OTL	L	GF	GA	GD	Pts	Qualification
United States	3	3	0	0	0	28	1	+27	9	Semifinals
Sweden	3	2	0	0	1	5	13	−8	6	Quarterfinals
Czech Republic	3	1	0	0	2	6	15	−9	3	Quarterfinals
Japan	3	0	0	0	3	3	13	−10	0	Relegation Round

Source: IIHF

All times local (CET/UTC+1)

1 January 2011; 16:00	United States	11–0 (2–0, 5–0, 4–0)	Czech Republic	Stora Mossen; Attendance: 158

Game reference

Megan Miller
Goalies
Veronika Hladíková
Lenka Craigová
Referee:
(Sweden) Malin Axelsson

A. Pelkey – 06:12	1–0
A. Carpenter (P. Savage) (PP) – 18:03	2–0
A. Pelkey (E. Field) – 20:53	3–0
K. Sylvester – 22:00	4–0
H. Brandt A. Pelkey – 27:18	5–0
S. Daniels (D. Trivigno, A. Ness) – 27:47	6–0
A. Ness (S. Daniels, E. Pfalzer) – 32:11	7–0
A. Pelkey (H. Brandt) – 41:34	8–0
H. Brandt (M. Picard) (PP) – 46:24	9–0
S. Darkangelo (L. Marvin) – 53:04	10–0
E. Pfalzer (H. Skarupa, A. Carpenter) (PP) – 59:13	11–0

8 min
Penalties
18 min
75
Shots
8

1 January 2011; 19:30	Sweden	2–1 (1–1, 1–0, 0–0)	Japan	Stora Mossen; Attendance: 207

Game reference

Sofia Carlström
Goalies
Shizuka Takahashi
Referee:
(Czech Republic) Radka Ruzickova

L. Peterson (M. Lind, L. Hedin) – 01:10	1–0
	1–1	12:17 – R. Moritake (M. Morii)
E. Martinssom (L. Bäcklin) – 27:17	2–1

10 min
Penalties
4 min
41
Shots
19

2 January 2011; 16:00	Japan	1–7 (1–2, 0–2, 0–3)	United States	Stora Mossen; Attendance: 114

Game reference

Shizuka Takahashi
Ai Tokoro
Goalies
Shenae Lundberg
Referee:
(Russia) Arina Ustinova

A. Toko (PP) – 06:18	1–0
	1–1	07:15 – E. Field (C Burke, A. Boulier)
	1–2	18:10 – E. Pflazer (L. Stecklein)
	1–3	23:47 – S. Daniels (A. Boulier)
	1–4	31:05 – A. Carpenter (H. Skarupa, P. Savage) (PP)
	1–5	45:35 – S. Darkangelo
	1–6	45:51 – L. Marvin (S. Darkangelo)
	1–7	56:18 – M. McMillen (M. Picard) (PP)

10 min
Penalties
4 min
7
Shots
76

2 January 2011; 19:30	Sweden	3–2 (1–1, 1–1, 1–0)	Czech Republic	Stora Mossen; Attendance: 227

Game reference

Sofia Carlström
Goalies
Veronika Hladíková
Referee:
(Netherlands) Debby Hengst

	0–1	00:36 – K. Solničková (K. Chmelová, M. Vonková)
L. Peterson (A. Kjellbin, C. Lillbäck) – 07:04	1–1
E. Martinsson (A. Borgfeldt, C. Markström) – 23:49	2–1
	2–2	39:59 – K. Kaplanová (D. Křížová)
L. Bäcklin (J. Holmgren, M. Lind) (PP) – 47:26	3–2

12 min
Penalties
10 min
42
Shots
28

4 January 2011; 16:00	Czech Republic	4–1 (1–1, 2–0, 1–0)	Japan	Stora Mossen; Attendance: 53

Game reference

Veronika Hladíková
Goalies
Shizuka Takahashi
Referee:
(United States) Kristine Langley

M. Vytiskova (K. Kaplanová) – 05:34	1–0
	1–1	11:46 – R. Ukita (R. Yamaya, F. Ishiura) (PP)
K. Solničková (M. Vonková, A. Kubátová) – 34:01	2–1
K. Kaplanová (J. Fialová, D. Křížová) – 39:54	3–1
M. Vytiskova (K. Vaňoučková) – 58:03 (ENG)	4–1

6 min
Penalties
12 min
43
Shots
25

4 January 2011; 19:30	United States	10–0 (4–0, 3–0, 3–0)	Sweden	Stora Mossen; Attendance: 403

Game reference

Megan Miller
Goalies
Sofia Carlström
Elin Moberg
Referee:
(Canada) Sylena Mutsaers

H. Brandt (E. Field, A. Pelkey) – 05:31	1–0
A. Carpenter (H. Skarupa) (PP) – 05:52	2–0
A. Carpenter (C. Burke) – 10:28	3–0
H. Brandt (A. Pelkey, E. Field) (PP) – 13:27	4–0
E. Field (L. Stecklein, C. Burke) (PP) – 22:58	5–0
S. Daniels (A. Boulier, A. Ness) – 36:57	6–0
P. Savage (A. Carpenter) – 38:20	7–0
M. McMillen (A. Carpenter, P. Savage) – 45:00	8–0
L. Marvin (K. Sylvester, C. Burke) – 51:43	9–0
E. Field (H. Brandt, A. Pelkey) – 57:14	10–0

10 min
Penalties
14 min
55
Shots
4

=== Relegation round ===
Best of three.

5 January 2011; 12:00	Switzerland	4–0 (0–0, 2–0, 2–0)	Japan	Husby Ishall; Attendance: 67

Game reference

Tamara Klossner
Goalies
Shizuka Takahashi
Referee:
(Czech Republic) Radka Ruzickova

L. Stalder (S. Wuttka) (PP) – 37:41	1–0
S. Lehner (S. Forster) (PP) – 38:02	2–0
S. Zollinger (L. Altmann, S. Forster) – 48:33	3–0
L. Stalder (S. Zollinger, P. Stänz) (PP) – 53:28	4–0

12 min
Penalties
8 min
35
Shots
28

7 January 2011; 17:30	Japan	5–1 (0–1, 3–0, 2–0)	Switzerland	Husby Ishall; Attendance: 68

Game reference

Ai Tokoro
Goalies
Tamara Klossner
Referee:
(Sweden) Malin Axelsson

	0–1	J. Bigler – 14:44
30:11 – M. Odaira	1–1
34:41 – R. Takeda	2–1
39:59 – R. Moritake	3–1
43:28 – N. Abe (F. Ishiura)	4–1
55:26 – M. Morii (R. Moritake)	5–1

12 min
Penalties
4 min
30
Shots
27

8 January 2011; 12:00	Switzerland	5–1 (1–0, 3–1, 1–0)	Japan	Husby Ishall; Attendance: 58

Game reference

Tamara Klossner
Goalies
Shizuka Takahashi
Referee:
(Canada) Sylena Mutsaers

S. Zollinger (P. Stänz, L. Stalder) (SH) – 17:27	1–0
P. Stänz (S. Kamber) – 21:01	2–0
S. Zollinger (L. Stalder, P. Stänz) (PP) – 25:50	3–0
S. Zollinger (P. Stänz, S. Forster) (PP) – 35:29	4–0
	4–1	37:14 – N. Abe (F. Ishiura, M. Morii)
S. Forster (L. Stalder, S. Zollinger) (PP) – 55:08	5–1

10 min
Penalties
8 min
35
Shots
22

Japan is relegated to Division I for the 2012 IIHF World Women's U18 Championship.

=== Final Round ===
Quarterfinals
A2	Germany	1
B3	Czech Republic	3
B2	Sweden	2
A3	Finland	3*

Semifinals
B1	United States	14
B3	Czech Republic	1
A1	Canada	6
A3	Finland	1

Gold medal game
B1	United States	5
A1	Canada	2
Bronze medal game
B3	Czech Republic	0
A3	Finland	3

* Decided in Overtime.

==== Quarterfinals ====
5 January 2011; 15:30	Germany	1–3 (0–0, 0–1, 1–2)	Czech Republic	Stora Mossen; Attendance: 81

Game reference

Nadja Gruber
Goalies
Veronika Hladíková
Referee:
(United States) Kristine Langley

	0–1	30:42 – K. Solničková
	0–2	40:51 – K. Chmelová (K. Solničková, M. Vonková)
K. Spielberger (R. Gräve) – 50:22	1–2
	1–3	53:19 – A. Tejralová (K. Kaplanová) (PP)

37 min
Penalties
10 min
23
Shots
39

5 January 2011; 19:00	Sweden	2–3 OT (0–0, 1–2, 1–0) (OT: 0–1)	Finland	Stora Mossen; Attendance: 202

Game reference

Sofia Carelstrom
Goalies
Isabella Portnoj
Referees:
(Netherlands) Debby Hengst
(Canada) Sylena Mutsaers

	0–1	20:50 – N. Tulus (A. Rantanen, S. Ollikainen)
L. Bäcklin (A. Borgfeldt, A. Johansson) (PP) – 28:00	1–1
	1–2	35:55 – V. Kotkaslahti (A. Kilponen) (PP)
M. Löwenhielm (M. Hedin) – 47:54	2–2
	2–3	61:46 – S. Valkama (A. Rantanen, E. Pietikäinen) (PP)

14 min
Penalties
14 min
31
Shots
37

==== Semifinals ====
7 January 2011; 15:30	Canada	6–1 (2–0, 3–0, 1–1)	Finland	Stora Mossen; Attendance: 157

Game reference

Ann-Renee Desbiens
Goalies
Isabella Portnoj
Referee:
(Czech Republic) Radka Ruzickova

E. Fulton (E. Ambrose, R. Kohler) (PP) – 05:05	1–0
S. MacDonnell (L. Stacey) – 15:46	2–0
C. Mercer (E. Fulton, E. Ambrose) (PP) – 28:05	3–0
N. Kosta (M. Dufault) – 30:11	4–0
S. Bram (M. Dufault) – 36:28	5–0
C. Roesler (L. Stacey) (PP) – 49:01	6–0
	6–1	S. Tapani (S. Valkama) – 58:01

8 min
Penalties
12 min
64
Shots
11

7 January 2011; 19:00	United States	14–1 (2–1, 5–0, 7–0)	Czech Republic	Stora Mossen; Attendance: 152

Game reference

Megan Miller
Goalies
Lenka Craigová
Referee:
(Russia) Arina Ustinova

H. Skarupa – 06:52	1–0
	1–1	06:59 – D. Křížová (K. Chmelová)
L. Marvin (M. McMillen, K. Sylvester) – 18:47	2–1
L. Marvin (K. Sylvester) – 22:49	3–1
A. Boulier – 27:00	4–1
H. Skarupa (M. Picard) – 29:27	5–1
A. Carpenter (H. Skarupa) – 32:49	6–1
E. Field (E. Pfalzer) (PP) – 34:28	7–1
A. Ness – 43:50	8–1
M. McMillen (E. Field) – 44:54	9–1
H. Skarupa (M. McMillen) – 48:53	10–1
L. Marvin (K. Sylvester) – 50:40	11–1
P. Savage (A. Carpenter, H. Skarupa) – 55:57	12–1
A. Ness (S. Daniels) – 58:59	13–1
S. Daniels – 59:06	14–1

4 min
Penalties
10 min
61
Shots
7

==== 5th place game ====
7 January 2011; 12:00	Germany	0–2 (0–2, 0–0, 0–0)	Sweden	Stora Mossen; Attendance: 147

Game reference
Nadja Gruber	Goalies	Elin Moberg	Referee: (Canada) Sylena Mutsaers
0–1 / 01:27 – M. Löwenhielm (T. Falkeborn); 0–2 / 19:59 – M. Löwenhielm (A. Kjellbin)			Referee: (Canada) Sylena Mutsaers
4 min	Penalties	8 min	Referee: (Canada) Sylena Mutsaers
28	Shots	25	Referee: (Canada) Sylena Mutsaers

==== Bronze medal game ====
8 January 2011; 15:30	Czech Republic	0–3 (0–1, 0–2, 0–3)	Finland	Stora Mossen; Attendance: 180

Game reference

Veronika Hladíková
Goalies
Isabella Portnoj
Referee:
(United States) Kristine Langlex

0–1	11:26 – S. Tapani (M. Heikkinen)
0–2	21:52 – J. Oinonen (S. Tapani) (PP)
0–3	25:40 – S. Valkama (S. Tapani, M. Heikkinen)

8 min
Penalties
6 min
26
Shots
33

==== Gold medal game ====
8 January 2011; 19:00	United States	5–2 (2–0, 2–2, 1–0)	Canada	Stora Mossen; Attendance: 436

Game reference

Megan Miller
Goalies
Ann-Renee Desbiens
Referee:
(Netherlands) Debby Hengst

A. Carpenter (P. Savage) (PP) – 06:56	1–0
H. Brandt (E. Field, A. Pelkey) (PP) – 15:39	2–0
L. Marvin (H. Brandt, K. Sylvester) – 32:27	3–0
	3–1	35:07 – E. Fulton (C. Mercer, R. Kohler)
A. Pelkey (H. Brandt) – 35:29	4–1
	4–2	37:33 – K. Josephs (K. Zgraja, N. Kosta)
M. McMillan (M. Picard, H. Brandt) (ENG) – 59:25	5–2

2 min
Penalties
6 min
30
Shots
16

=== Final rankings ===
Pos	Grp	Team	Pld	W	OTW	OTL	L	GF	GA	GD	Pts	Final result
1	B	United States	5	5	0	0	0	47	4	+43	15	Champions
2	A	Canada	5	4	0	0	1	31	8	+23	12	Runners-up
3	A	Finland	6	2	1	0	3	11	16	−5	8	Third place
4	B	Czech Republic	6	2	0	0	4	10	33	−23	6	Fourth place
5	B	Sweden (H)	5	3	0	1	1	9	16	−7	10	Fifth place game
6	A	Germany	5	2	0	0	3	7	15	−8	6	Fifth place game
7	A	Switzerland	6	2	0	0	4	14	23	−9	6	Win Relegation game
8	B	Japan	6	1	0	0	5	9	23	−14	3	Relegation to Division I A

Source: IIHF
(H) Host

==== Scoring leaders ====
List shows the top skaters sorted by points, then goals. If the list exceeds 10 skaters because of a tie in points, all of the tied skaters are shown.

Player	GP	G	A	Pts	+/−	PIM	POS
(United States) Alex Carpenter	5	6	4	10	+4	0	FW
(United States) Hannah Brandt	5	5	5	10	+11	2	FW
(United States) Amanda Pelkey	5	4	6	10	+9	2	FW
(United States) Emily Field	5	4	5	9	+8	0	FW
(Canada) Nicole Kosta	5	5	3	8	+5	6	FW
(United States) Haley Skarupa	5	3	5	8	+5	0	FW
(Canada) Meghan Dufault	5	2	6	8	+6	2	FW
(United States) Layla Marvin	5	6	1	7	+9	2	FW
(Canada) Laura Stacey	5	3	4	7	+1	2	FW
(Switzerland) Phoebe Stänz	6	3	4	7	−4	14	FW
(Switzerland) Lara Stalder	6	3	4	7	−3	6	DF

GP = Games played; G = Goals; A = Assists; Pts = Points; +/− = Plus/minus; PIM = Penalties in minutes; POS = Position

==== Leading goaltenders ====
Only the top five goaltenders, based on save percentage, who have played 40% of their team's minutes are included in this list.

Player	TOI	GA	GAA	Sv%	SO
(Canada) Amanda Makela	120:00	2	1.00	94.59	0
(Germany) Nadja Gruber	239:27	7	1.75	94.35	1
(Switzerland) Tamara Klossner	237:34	8	2.02	92.98	1
(Finland) Isabella Portnoj	341:46	15	2.63	92.82	1
(Czech Republic) Veronika Hladíková	270:31	14	3.11	91.57	0

TOI = Time on ice (minutes:seconds); GA = Goals against; GAA = Goals against average; Sv% = Save percentage; SO = Shutouts

==== Tournament awards ====
Best players selected by the directorate:

- Best Goaltender: (Finland) Isabella Portnoj
- Best Defenceman: (United States) Milica McMillen
- Best Forward: (United States) Alex Carpenter

== Division I ==
The tournament was held in Dmitrov, Russia, from 28 March to 3 April 2011.

Team	Pld	W	OTW	OTL	L	GF	GA	GD	Pts	Promotion or relegation
Russia	5	5	0	0	0	44	2	+42	15	Promoted to the 2012 Top Division
Slovakia	5	4	0	0	1	19	11	+8	12	
Austria	5	3	0	0	2	19	14	+5	9	
Norway	5	2	0	0	3	16	11	+5	6	
France	5	1	0	0	4	5	25	−20	3	Relegated to the 2012 Qualification Tournament
Kazakhstan	5	0	0	0	5	8	48	−40	0	Relegated to the 2012 Qualification Tournament

Source: IIHF

== See also ==
- 2011 IIHF World U18 Championships (Men)
- 2011 World Junior Ice Hockey Championships (Men)
