= 2017 IIHF Women's World Championship =

2017 edition of the IIHF Women's World Championship

Tournament details
- Host country: United States
- Venue: 1 (in 1 host city)
- Dates: 31 March – 7 April 2017
- Opened by: Donald Trump
- Teams: 8

Final positions
- Champions: United States (8th title)
- Runners-up: Canada
- Third place: Finland
- Fourth place: Germany

Tournament statistics
- Games played: 22
- Goals scored: 115 (5.23 per game)
- Attendance: 20,034 (911 per game)
- Scoring leader: (United States) Kendall Coyne (12 points)

Awards
- MVP: (United States) Brianna Decker

Official website
- Official website

The 2017 IIHF Women's World Championship was the 18th edition of the Top Division of the Women's Ice Hockey World Championship organized by the International Ice Hockey Federation. The tournament was held in Plymouth Township, Michigan, United States from 31 March to 7 April 2017. The USA Hockey Arena served as the event's venue using Arena I and Arena II.

Three-time defending champions, the United States, winning their fourth consecutive and eighth overall title, after defeated Canada in the gold medal game 3–2 after overtime. Finland won the bronze medal by beating Germany 8–0.

== Venues ==
USA Hockey Arena I 3,504	USA Hockey Arena II 800

== Participating teams ==
Group A

- United States – Hosts
- Canada
- Finland
- Russia

Group B

- Sweden
- Switzerland
- Germany – Promoted from Division I Group A in 2016
- Czech Republic

== Match officials ==
10 referees and 9 linesmen were selected for the tournament.

Referees

- (United States) Dina Allen
- (Canada) Gabrielle Ariano-Lortie
- (Slovakia) Nikoleta Celárová
- (Switzerland) Anna Eskola
- (Switzerland) Drahomira Fialova
- (Sweden) Gabriella Gran
- (Germany) Nicole Hertrich
- (Norway) Aina Hove
- (Japan) Miyuki Nakayama
- (United States) Melissa Szkola

Linesmen

- (Austria) Bettina Angerer
- (Sweden) Veronica Johansson
- (Slovakia) Michaela Kúdeľová
- (United States) Jessica Leclerc
- (Germany) Lisa Linnek
- (Czech Republic) Ilona Novotná
- (Slovenia) Nataša Pagon
- (Finland) Johanna Tauriainen
- (Canada) Justine Todd

== Rosters ==
Each team's roster consists of at least 15 skaters (forwards, and defencemen) and 2 goaltenders, and at most 20 skaters and 3 goaltenders. All eight participating nations, through the confirmation of their respective national associations, had to submit a "Long List" roster no later than two weeks before the tournament, and a final roster by the Passport Control meeting prior to the start of tournament.

== Preliminary round ==
All times are local (UTC−4).

=== Group A ===
Pos	Team	Pld	W	OTW	OTL	L	GF	GA	GD	Pts	Qualification
1	United States (H)	3	3	0	0	0	14	3	+11	9	Semifinals
2	Canada	3	1	0	0	2	11	6	+5	3 (Note: Canada 3 Pts, +7 GD; Finland 3 Pts, 0 GD; Russia 3 Pts, −7 GD)	Semifinals
3	Finland	3	1	0	0	2	8	10	−2	3	Quarterfinals
4	Russia	3	1	0	0	2	2	16	−14	3	Quarterfinals

Source: IIHF
Rules for classification: 1) points; 2) head-to-head points; 3) head-to-head goal difference; 4) head-to-head number of goals scored; 5) result against closest best-ranked team outside tied teams; 6) result against second-best ranked team outside tied teams; 7) seeding before tournament.
(H) Host
Notes:

31 March 2017; 16:00	Finland	1–2 (0–0, 1–0, 0–2)	Russia	USA Hockey Arena, Plymouth; Attendance: 146

Game reference

Noora Räty
Goalies
Nadezhda Alexandrova
Referees:
(United States) Dina Allen
(Germany) Nicole Hertrich
Linesmen:
(Austria) Bettina Angerer
(United States) Jessica Leclerc

Välilä (Karvinen, Tapani) – 26:06	1–0
	1–1	42:19 – Kadirova
	1–2	59:10 – Smolentseva (Vafina, Shibanova) (PP)

14 min
Penalties
8 min
26
Shots
19

31 March 2017; 19:35	United States	2–0 (0–0, 1–0, 1–0)	Canada	USA Hockey Arena, Plymouth; Attendance: 3,152

Game reference
Nicole Hensley	Goalies	Shannon Szabados	Referees: (Sweden) Gabriella Gran (Norway) Aina Hove; Linesmen: (Slovenia) Nataša Pagon (Finland) Johanna Tauriainen
Decker (Bozek) – 37:54 / 1–0; Marvin (Stack) – 44:49 / 2–0			Referees: (Sweden) Gabriella Gran (Norway) Aina Hove; Linesmen: (Slovenia) Nataša Pagon (Finland) Johanna Tauriainen
2 min	Penalties	4 min	Referees: (Sweden) Gabriella Gran (Norway) Aina Hove; Linesmen: (Slovenia) Nataša Pagon (Finland) Johanna Tauriainen
30	Shots	18	Referees: (Sweden) Gabriella Gran (Norway) Aina Hove; Linesmen: (Slovenia) Nataša Pagon (Finland) Johanna Tauriainen

1 April 2017; 15:35	Russia	0–7 (0–1, 0–3, 0–3)	United States	USA Hockey Arena, Plymouth; Attendance: 1,919

Game reference

Maria Sorokina
Goalies
Maddie Rooney
Referees:
(Switzerland) Anna Eskola
(Switzerland) Drahomira Fialova
Linesmen:
(Czech Republic) Ilona Novotná
(Canada) Justine Todd

0–1	18:37 – Kessel (M. Lamoureux, Decker)
0–2	32:08 – Coyne (Decker, Bellamy)
0–3	33:04 – J. Lamoureux (Kessel, Pfalzer)
0–4	39:37 – J. Lamoureux (Coyne, M. Lamoureux) (PP)
0–5	49:15 – Decker (Knight)
0–6	59:39 – Coyne (Knight, M. Lamoureux)
0–7	59:53 – Decker (Bellamy, Coyne)

8 min
Penalties
8 min
14
Shots
34

1 April 2017; 19:35	Canada	3–4 (1–1, 1–2, 1–1)	Finland	USA Hockey Arena, Plymouth; Attendance: 780

Game reference

Emerance Maschmeyer
Geneviève Lacasse
Goalies
Noora Räty
Referees:
(Germany) Nicole Hertrich
(United States) Melissa Szkola
Linesmen:
(Slovakia) Michaela Kúdeľová
(Germany) Lisa Linnek

	0–1	18:42 – Hakala (Tapani)
Poulin (Ambrose, Johnston) – 19:08	1–1
	1–2	21:01 – Nieminen (Tapani, Tuominen) (PP)
Turnbull (Fortino, Rougeau) – 24:21	2–2
	2–3	26:49 – Tapani (Säkkinen)
Johnston (Poulin, Larocque) – 40:36	3–3
	3–4	58:19 – Savolainen

8 min
Penalties
12 min
38
Shots
26

3 April 2017; 15:35	Canada	8–0 (4–0, 1–0, 3–0)	Russia	USA Hockey Arena, Plymouth; Attendance: 516

Game reference

Shannon Szabados
Goalies
Maria Sorokina
Nadezhda Alexandrova
Referees:
(Slovakia) Nikoleta Celárová
(Switzerland) Anna Eskola
Linesmen:
(Slovenia) Nataša Pagon
(Finland) Johanna Tauriainen

Wakefield (Irwin, Agosta) (PP) – 14:30	1–0
Clark (Johnston, Poulin) – 15:33	2–0
Wakefield (Irwin, Krzyzaniak) – 16:51	3–0
Spooner (Potomak) – 18:37	4–0
Ambrose (Poulin, Jenner) (PP) – 31:01	5–0
Jenner (Johnstone) (PP) – 44:56	6–0
Agosta (Wakefield) – 46:41	7–0
Potomak (Larocque, Mikkelson) – 59:19	8–0

8 min
Penalties
14 min
41
Shots
16

3 April 2017; 19:35	United States	5–3 (1–1, 2–1, 2–1)	Finland	USA Hockey Arena, Plymouth; Attendance: 1,368

Game reference

Alex Rigsby
Goalies
Noora Räty
Referees:
(Switzerland) Drahomira Fialova
(Japan) Miyuki Nakayama
Linesmen:
(Austria) Bettina Angerer
(Slovakia) Michaela Kúdeľová

	0–1	04:46 – Tapani (Niskanen)
Knight (Coyne, Decker) (PP2) – 12:21	1–1
Coyne (Stack, Kessel) (PP) – 23:33	2–1
Knight (Decker, Coyne) (PP) – 35:43	3–1
	3–2	39:36 – Hiirikoski (Karvinen, Hovi)
	3–3	49:04 – Karvinen
Brandt (Marvin) – 52:25	4–3
J. Lamoureux (ENG) – 59:00	5–3

8 min
Penalties
16 min
40
Shots
24

=== Group B ===
Pos	Team	Pld	W	OTW	OTL	L	GF	GA	GD	Pts	Qualification
1	Germany	3	2	0	0	1	7	6	+1	6 (Note: Sweden 1–3 Germany)	Quarterfinals
2	Sweden	3	2	0	0	1	6	5	+1	6	Quarterfinals
3	Switzerland	3	1	1	0	1	7	5	+2	5	Relegation round
4	Czech Republic	3	0	0	1	2	3	7	−4	1	Relegation round

Source: IIHF
Rules for classification: 1) points; 2) head-to-head points; 3) head-to-head goal difference; 4) head-to-head number of goals scored; 5) result against closest best-ranked team outside tied teams; 6) result against second-best ranked team outside tied teams; 7) seeding before tournament.
Notes:

31 March 2017; 12:00	Czech Republic	1–2 GWS (0–0, 1–0, 0–1) (OT 0–0) (SO: 0–1)	Switzerland	USA Hockey Arena, Plymouth; Attendance: 428

Game reference
Klára Peslarová	Goalies	Florence Schelling	Referees: (Japan) Miyuki Nakayama (United States) Melissa Szkola; Linesmen: (Slovakia) Michaela Kúdeľová (Germany) Lisa Linnek
Vanišová (SH) – 34:18 / 1–0; / 1–1 / 56:15 – Raselli (Müller) (PP)			Referees: (Japan) Miyuki Nakayama (United States) Melissa Szkola; Linesmen: (Slovakia) Michaela Kúdeľová (Germany) Lisa Linnek
Chmelová (miss); Mrázová (miss); Pejzlová (miss); Mrázová (miss); Hymlarová (miss)	Shootout	(miss) Stalder; (miss) Bullo; (miss) Müller; (miss) Müller; Meier	Referees: (Japan) Miyuki Nakayama (United States) Melissa Szkola; Linesmen: (Slovakia) Michaela Kúdeľová (Germany) Lisa Linnek
12 min	Penalties	10 min	Referees: (Japan) Miyuki Nakayama (United States) Melissa Szkola; Linesmen: (Slovakia) Michaela Kúdeľová (Germany) Lisa Linnek
31	Shots	31	Referees: (Japan) Miyuki Nakayama (United States) Melissa Szkola; Linesmen: (Slovakia) Michaela Kúdeľová (Germany) Lisa Linnek

31 March 2017; 15:35	Sweden	1–3 (0–0, 1–3, 0–0)	Germany	USA Hockey Arena, Plymouth; Attendance: 480

Game reference

Sara Grahn
Goalies
Jennifer Harß
Referees:
(Canada) Gabrielle Ariano-Lortie
(Switzerland) Anna Eskola
Linesmen:
(Czech Republic) Ilona Novotná
(Canada) Justine Todd

	0–1	22:40 – N. Eisenschmid (Lanzl, Kluge) (PP)
L. Johansson – 26:11	1–1
	1–2	38:47 – Anwander (Strobel, Kluge)
	1–3	39:08 – Lanzl (Zorn)

4 min
Penalties
2 min
32
Shots
23

1 April 2017; 12:00	Czech Republic	1–2 (0–0, 0–1, 1–1)	Germany	USA Hockey Arena, Plymouth; Attendance: 496

Game reference

Klára Peslarová
Goalies
Ivonne Schröder
Referees:
(United States) Dina Allen
(Slovakia) Nikoleta Celárová
Linesmen:
(United States) Jessica Leclerc
(Finland) Johanna Tauriainen

	0–1	34:39 – Zorn (Kluge)
Lédlová (Polenská, Zedníková) – 49:40	1–1
	1–2	58:23 – Kluge (Delarbre)

2 min
Penalties
8 min
41
Shots
12

1 April 2017; 18:00	Switzerland	1–2 (0–1, 1–0, 0–1)	Sweden	USA Hockey Arena, Plymouth; Attendance: 168

Game reference

Florence Schelling
Goalies
Sara Grahn
Referees:
(Norway) Aina Hove
(Japan) Miyuki Nakayama
Linesmen:
(Austria) Bettina Angerer
(Slovenia) Nataša Pagon

	0–1	05:24 – Olsson
Bullo (I. Waidacher, Staenz) – 33:25	1–1
	1–2	46:48 – Johansson (Olsson, Winberg) (PP2)

18 min
Penalties
0 min
15
Shots
24

3 April 2017; 12:00	Germany	2–4 (0–3, 0–0, 2–1)	Switzerland	USA Hockey Arena, Plymouth; Attendance: 404

Game reference

Franziska Albl
Jennifer Harß
Goalies
Florence Schelling
Referees:
(Canada) Gabrielle Ariano-Lortie
(Sweden) Gabriella Gran
Linesmen:
(Sweden) Veronica Johansson
(Canada) Justine Todd

	0–1	11:22 – Stalder (Müller, Meier)
	0–2	12:00 – Müller (Stalder)
	0–3	15:05 – Müller (Stalder, Raselli) (PP)
Delarbre (Kratzer) – 40:23	1–3
Fiegert (Zorn, Anwander) (PP2) – 55:22	2–3
	2–4	59:08 – Müller (ENG)

4 min
Penalties
10 min
29
Shots
30

3 April 2017; 18:00	Sweden	3–1 (1–1, 2–0, 0–0)	Czech Republic	USA Hockey Arena, Plymouth; Attendance: 111

Game reference

Sara Grahn
Goalies
Klára Peslarová
Referees:
(United States) Dina Allen
(United States) Melissa Szkola
Linesmen:
(United States) Jessica Leclerc
(Germany) Lisa Linnek

	0–1	10:39 – Pejzlová (Tejralová) (PP)
Fallman (Lindh) – 15:48	1–1
Fallman (Nordin, Svedin) (PP) – 25:12	2–1
Rask (Lowenhielm) – 27:59	3–1

2 min
Penalties
6 min
16
Shots
20

== Relegation round ==
The third and fourth placed team from Group B played a best-of-three series to determine the relegated team. The IIHF opted to expand the World Championship to ten teams starting in 2019, so no team was relegated after all.

4 April 2017; 12:00	Switzerland	2–4 (0–2, 0–1, 2–1)	Czech Republic	USA Hockey Arena, Plymouth; Attendance: 355

Game reference

Florence Schelling
Goalies
Klára Peslarová
Referees:
(Slovakia) Nikoleta Celárová
(Germany) Nicole Hertrich
Linesmen:
(Austria) Bettina Angerer
(Finland) Johanna Tauriainen

	0–1	14:29 – Vanišová (Lédlová, Mrázová)
	0–2	18:59 – Mrázová
	0–3	30:43 – Lédlová
Stalder (Stiefel, Bullo) – 52:23	1–3
Altmann (Stalder) – 54:05	2–3
	2–4	59:42 – Lédlová (ENG)

4 min
Penalties
10 min
29
Shots
22

6 April 2017; 12:00	Czech Republic	2–3 OT (0–0, 1–2, 1–0) (OT 0–1)	Switzerland	USA Hockey Arena, Plymouth; Attendance: 478

Game reference

Klára Peslarová
Goalies
Florence Schelling
Referees:
(Germany) Nicole Hertrich
(United States) Melissa Szkola
Linesmen:
(Austria) Bettina Angerer
(Germany) Lisa Linnek

Vanišová (Lédlová) – 28:39	1–0
	1–1	32:59 – Bullo (Staenz, Raselli)
	1–2	39:47 – Stalder
Vanišová (Herzigová) – 43:55	2–2
	2–3	64:26 – Meier (Stalder, Benz)

6 min
Penalties
6 min
36
Shots
29

7 April 2017; 12:00	Switzerland	3–1 (2–1, 0–0, 1–0)	Czech Republic	USA Hockey Arena, Plymouth; Attendance: 457

Game reference

Florence Schelling
Goalies
Blanka Škodová
Referees:
(United States) Dina Allen
(Norway) Aina Hove
Linesmen:
(Sweden) Veronica Johansson
(Germany) Lisa Linnek

Rüegg (Müller, Stalder) – 07:01	1–0
Müller (Meier, Schelling) (PP) – 09:35	2–0
	2–1	11:28 – Vanišová (Lédlová)
Stalder (Müller, Meier) (PP) – 41:03	3–1

14 min
Penalties
12 min
17
Shots
19

- Switzerland won series 2–1 and finished in 7th place.

== Final round ==
=== Bracket ===
Quarterfinals
A4	Russia	1
B1	Germany	2
A3	Finland	4
B2	Sweden	0

Semifinals
A1	United States	11
B1	Germany	0
A2	Canada	4
A3	Finland	0

Final
A1	United States	3
A2	Canada	2
Bronze medal game
A3	Finland	8
B1	Germany	0

==== Quarterfinals ====
4 April 2017; 15:35	Finland	4–0 (2–0, 1–0, 1–0)	Sweden	USA Hockey Arena, Plymouth; Attendance: 397

Game reference

Noora Räty
Goalies
Sara Grahn
Referees:
(United States) Dina Allen
(Canada) Gabrielle Ariano-Lortie
Linesmen:
(United States) Jessica Leclerc
(Slovenia) Nataša Pagon

Säkkinen (Lindstedt, Karna) – 04:19	1–0
Välimäki (Tuominen, Tapani) (PP) – 06:55	2–0
Hiirikoski (Tapani) (PP) – 23:03	3–0
Tapani (Valila, Karvinen) – 48:53	4–0

8 min
Penalties
12 min
42
Shots
16

4 April 2017; 19:35	Russia	1–2 (1–0, 0–1, 0–1)	Germany	USA Hockey Arena, Plymouth; Attendance: 486

Game reference

Nadezhda Alexandrova
Goalies
Jennifer Harß
Referees:
(Switzerland) Anna Eskola
(Norway) Aina Hove
Linesmen:
(Sweden) Veronica Johansson
(Czech Republic) Ilona Novotná

Shokhina (Shtaryova, Dergachyova) – 02:36	1–0
	1–1	34:44 – Spielberger (Zorn, Fiegert) (PP2)
	1–2	49:12 – Delarbre (Graeve, Spielberger)

12 min
Penalties
6 min
24
Shots
22

==== Semifinals ====
6 April 2017; 15:35	Canada	4–0 (1–0, 2–0, 1–0)	Finland	USA Hockey Arena, Plymouth; Attendance: 1,166

Game reference

Shannon Szabados
Goalies
Noora Räty
Referees:
(United States) Dina Allen
(Sweden) Gabriella Gran
Linesmen:
(Sweden) Veronica Johansson
(United States) Jessica Leclerc

Potomak (Jenner, Spooner) – 17:35	1–0
Poulin (Spooner) – 25:08	2–0
Johnston (Poulin) (PP) – 27:33	3–0
Clark (Rougeau) (SH, ENG) – 55:31	4–0

12 min
Penalties
10 min
35
Shots
23

6 April 2017; 19:35	United States	11–0 (2–0, 5–0, 4–0)	Germany	USA Hockey Arena, Plymouth; Attendance: 1,872

Game reference

Nicole Hensley
Goalies
Jennifer Harß
Ivonne Schröder
Referees:
(Canada) Gabrielle Ariano-Lortie
(Norway) Aina Hove
Linesmen:
(Finland) Johanna Tauriainen
(Canada) Justine Todd

Knight (Coyne) – 01:06	1–0
Stack (Skarupa, M. Lamoureux) – 08:47	2–0
Coyne (Decker, M. Lamoureux) (PP) – 22:02	3–0
Pfalzer (Kessel, Keller) – 22:38	4–0
J. Lamoureux (Stack) – 23:24	5–0
Coyne (Knight, Decker) – 24:22	6–0
Keller (Kessel) – 26:15	7–0
Pelkey (Bellamy, Kessel) – 44:19	8–0
M. Lamoureux (Decker, Knight) – 53:06	9–0
Skarupa (Stack) – 54:10	10–0
Carpenter (Keller) (PP) – 59:47	11–0

2 min
Penalties
10 min
50
Shots
8

==== Fifth place game ====
6 April 2017; 17:00	Russia	4–3 GWS (0–1, 0–1, 3–1) (OT 0–0) (SO: 1–0)	Sweden	USA Hockey Arena, Plymouth; Attendance: 102

Game reference

Maria Sorokina
Nadezhda Alexandrova
Goalies
Lovisa Berndtsson
Referees:
(Slovakia) Nikoleta Celárová
(Switzerland) Drahomira Fialova
Linesmen:
(Slovakia) Michaela Kúdeľová
(Czech Republic) Ilona Novotná

	0–1	17:07 – Fallman (Udén Johansson, Lindh)
	0–2	20:42 – Fallman (Nordin) (PP2)
Belyakova (Dergachyova) – 42:30	1–2
Kadirova (Smolentseva, Pirogova) – 50:47	2–2
Sosina (Shokhina) – 53:48	3–2
	3–3	57:52 – Winberg (Nordin) (PP)

Shukina (miss)
Belyakova (miss)
Sosina
Shokhina (miss)
Kadirova
Shootout
(miss) Winberg
(miss) Johansson
(miss) Olsson
Grahm
(miss) Borgqvist
32 min
Penalties
8 min
39
Shots
23

==== Bronze medal game ====
7 April 2017; 15:35	Finland	8–0 (3–0, 5–0, 0–0)	Germany	USA Hockey Arena, Plymouth; Attendance: 836

Game reference

Noora Räty
Goalies
Jennifer Harß
Ivonne Schröder
Referees:
(Canada) Gabrielle Ariano-Lortie
(United States) Melissa Szkola
Linesmen:
(United States) Jessica Leclerc
(Canada) Justine Todd

Nieminen (Välimäki, Hiirikoski) – 00:53	1–0
Savolainen (Hovi, Tuominen) – 16:17	2–0
Hovi (Välimäki) (SH) – 17:30	3–0
Hiirikoski (Valila, Karvinen) (PP) – 21:42	4–0
Tulus (Hiirikoski, Niskanen) – 29:08	5–0
Valkama (Tulus, Lindstedt) – 31:15	6–0
Nieminen (Kilponen) – 35:15	7–0
Jalosuo (Tapani) – 39:42	8–0

6 min
Penalties
18 min
38
Shots
11

==== Final ====
7 April 2017; 19:35	United States	3–2 OT (1–1, 0–0, 1–1) (OT 1–0)	Canada	USA Hockey Arena, Plymouth; Attendance: 3,917

Game reference

Nicole Hensley
Goalies
Shannon Szabados
Referees:
(Switzerland) Anna Eskola
(Sweden) Gabriella Gran
Linesmen:
(Slovenia) Natasa Pagon
(Finland) Johanna Tauriainen

	0–1	01:01 – Agosta (Wakefield)
Bellamy (Coyne, Decker) – 04:34	1–1
Bellamy (Knight, Decker) – 40:42	2–1
	2–2	49:44 – Jenner (PP)
Knight (Coyne) – 70:17	3–2

10 min
Penalties
10 min
40
Shots
30

== Final standings ==
Rank	Team
1st place, gold medalist(s)	United States
2nd place, silver medalist(s)	Canada
3rd place, bronze medalist(s)	Finland
4	Germany
5	Russia
6	Sweden
7	Switzerland
8	Czech Republic

== Statistics and awards ==
=== Scoring leaders ===
List shows the top skaters sorted by points, then goals.

Player	GP	G	A	Pts	+/−	PIM	POS
(United States) Kendall Coyne	5	5	7	12	+10	0	F
(United States) Brianna Decker	5	3	9	12	+11	8	F
(United States) Hilary Knight	5	4	5	9	+10	0	F
(Switzerland) Lara Stalder	6	4	5	9	+5	2	F
(Finland) Susanna Tapani	6	3	6	9	0	2	F
(Switzerland) Alina Müller	6	4	4	8	+2	2	F
(Czech Republic) Aneta Lédlová	6	3	3	6	+7	12	F
(Canada) Marie-Philip Poulin	5	2	4	6	+3	2	F
(United States) Amanda Kessel	5	1	5	6	+4	0	F
(United States) Monique Lamoureux	5	1	5	6	+11	0	D

GP = Games played; G = Goals; A = Assists; Pts = Points; +/− = Plus/minus; PIM = Penalties in minutes; POS = Position
Source: IIHF.com

=== Leading goaltenders ===
Only the top five goaltenders, based on save percentage, who have played at least 40% of their team's minutes, are included in this list.

Player	TOI	GA	GAA	SA	Sv%	SO
(United States) Nicole Hensley	190:17	2	0.63	56	96.43	2
(Canada) Shannon Szabados	248:29	5	1.21	109	95.41	2
(Switzerland) Florence Schelling	368:00	11	1.79	160	93.12	0
(Finland) Noora Räty	355:03	12	2.03	157	92.36	2
(Russia) Nadezhda Alexandrova	183:18	6	1.96	70	91.43	0

TOI = Time on Ice (minutes:seconds); SA = Shots against; GA = Goals against; GAA = Goals against average; Sv% = Save percentage; SO = Shutouts
Source: IIHF.com

=== Awards ===
- Best players selected by the directorate:
  - Best Goaltender: (Finland) Noora Räty
  - Best Defenceman: (Finland) Jenni Hiirikoski
  - Best Forward: (United States) Brianna Decker

Source: IIHF.com

- All-star team
  - Goaltender: (Finland) Noora Räty
  - Defence: (United States) Monique Lamoureux, (Finland) Jenni Hiirikoski
  - Forwards: (Canada) Marie-Philip Poulin, (United States) Brianna Decker, (United States) Kendall Coyne
- MVP: (United States) Brianna Decker

Source: IIHF.com

== Threatened boycott by US players ==
On 15 March 2017, the U.S. team announced that unless concessions were made by USA Hockey, they would boycott the World Championship to protest inequitable support and conditions for women's hockey. The players were publicly supported by the players' associations for the NBA, WNBA, MLB, NFL, and the NHL.

After several days of stalled negotiations and attempts to field a team of non-boycotting players, causing concern over such a team being competitive, an agreement was struck with USA Hockey to increase player pay and support for women's development; the original players immediately agreed to play in the World Championship.
