= 2016 IIHF Women's World Championship =

2016 edition of the IIHF Women's World Championship

Tournament details
- Host country: Canada
- Venues: 2 (in 1 host city)
- Dates: 28 March – 4 April 2016
- Opened by: David Johnston
- Teams: 8

Final positions
- Champions: United States (7th title)
- Runners-up: Canada
- Third place: Russia
- Fourth place: Finland

Tournament statistics
- Games played: 21
- Goals scored: 107 (5.1 per game)
- Attendance: 41,109 (1,958 per game)
- Scoring leader: (United States) Hilary Knight (9 points)

Awards
- MVP: (United States) Hilary Knight

Official website
- Official website

The 2016 IIHF Women's World Championship was the 17th such event organized by the International Ice Hockey Federation. The tournament was played in Kamloops, Canada, from 28 March to 4 April 2016. Venues included the Sandman Centre, and the McArthur Island Sport and Event Centre.

Two-time defending champions, the United States, securing their third consecutive and seventh title overall, after defeated Canada in the gold medal game 1–0 in overtime. Russia won the bronze medal by defeating Finland in a shootout.

== Venues ==
Kamloops
Sandman Centre Capacity: 5,464	McArthur Island Sport and Event Centre Capacity: 1,000

== Participating teams ==
Group A

- United States
- Canada – Hosts
- Finland
- Russia

Group B

- Sweden
- Switzerland
- Japan
- Czech Republic – Promoted from 2015 Division I Group A

== Match officials ==
10 referees and 9 linesmen were selected for the tournament.

Referees

- (Canada) Gabrielle Ariano-Lortie
- (Canada) Melanie Bordeleau
- (Switzerland) Anna Eskola
- (Switzerland) Drahomira Fialova
- (United States) Jerilyn Glenn
- (Sweden) Gabriella Gran
- (Germany) Nicole Hertrich
- (Norway) Aina Hove
- (United States) Jamie Huntley
- (Japan) Miyuki Nakayama

Linesmen

- (Austria) Bettina Angerer
- (United States) Michaela Frattarelli
- (France) Charlotte Girard
- (Finland) Jenni Heikkinen
- (Sweden) Veronica Johansson
- (Czech Republic) Ilona Novotná
- (Slovenia) Nataša Pagon
- (Canada) Vanessa Stratton
- (Finland) Johanna Tauriainen

== Rosters ==
Each team's roster consisted of at least 15 skaters (forwards, and defencemen) and 2 goaltenders, and at most 20 skaters and 3 goaltenders. All eight participating nations, through the confirmation of their respective national associations, had to submit a roster by the first IIHF directorate.

== Preliminary round ==
The schedule was announced on 16 September 2015.

All times are local (Pacific Time Zone – UTC−7).

=== Group A ===
Pos	Team	Pld	W	OTW	OTL	L	GF	GA	GD	Pts	Qualification
1	United States	3	3	0	0	0	13	2	+11	9	Semifinals
2	Canada (H)	3	2	0	0	1	15	5	+10	6	Semifinals
3	Finland	3	1	0	0	2	7	11	−4	3	Quarterfinals
4	Russia	3	0	0	0	3	4	21	−17	0	Quarterfinals

Source: IIHF
Rules for classification: 1) points; 2) head-to-head points; 3) head-to-head goal difference; 4) head-to-head number of goals scored; 5) result against closest best-ranked team outside tied teams; 6) result against second-best ranked team outside tied teams; 7) seeding before tournament.
(H) Host

28 March 2016; 15:30	Russia	3–5 (0–1, 2–1, 1–3)	Finland	Sandman Centre, Kamloops; Attendance: 1,107

Game reference

Nadezhda Morozova
Goalies
Meeri Räisänen
Referees:
(Canada) Gabrielle Ariano-Lortie
(Germany) Nicole Hertrich
Linesmen:
(United States) Michaela Frattarelli
(France) Charlotte Girard

	0–1	18:42 – Niskanen (Saari)
Gavrilova – 31:44	1–1
	1–2	34:12 – Hiirikoski (Lindstedt, Välilä) (PP)
Shibanova (Vafina, Pirogova) (PP) – 35:43	2–2
	2–3	43:31 – Niskanen (Jalosuo) (PP)
Gavrilova (PP) – 47:05	3–3
	3–4	48:07 – Savolainen (Niskanen)
	3–5	50:35 – Tulus (Saari, Jalosuo)

8 min
Penalties
8 min
25
Shots
28

28 March 2016; 19:30	United States	3–1 (0–0, 0–0, 3–1)	Canada	Sandman Centre, Kamloops; Attendance: 5,580

Game reference

Alex Rigsby
Goalies
Emerance Maschmeyer
Referees:
(Sweden) Gabriella Gran
(Norway) Aina Hove
Linesmen:
(Czech Republic) Ilona Novotná
(Finland) Johanna Tauriainen

	0–1	40:14 – Fortino (Spooner, Poulin)
Knight (M. Lamoureux, J. Lamoureux) – 49:58	1–1
Decker (M. Lamoureux) (PP) – 53:55	2–1
Knight (Decker) (ENG) – 59:40	3–1

6 min
Penalties
12 min
38
Shots
23

29 March 2016; 15:30	Finland	1–2 (1–1, 0–1, 0–0)	United States	Sandman Centre, Kamloops; Attendance: 1,149

Game reference

Meeri Räisänen
Goalies
Jessie Vetter
Referees:
(Canada) Melanie Bordeleau
(Japan) Miyuki Nakayama
Linesmen:
(Sweden) Veronica Johansson
(Canada) Vanessa Stratton

Karvinen (Valila, Jalosuo) – 05:03	1–0
	1–1	19:02 – Knight (Stecklein)
	1–2	35:09 – J. Lamoureux (Darkangelo, Pankowski)

10 min
Penalties
2 min
7
Shots
51

29 March 2016; 19:30	Canada	8–1 (0–1, 6–0, 2–0)	Russia	Sandman Centre, Kamloops; Attendance: 4,453

Game reference

Charline Labonté
Goalies
Anna Prugova
Maria Sorokina
Referees:
(Germany) Nicole Hertrich
(United States) Jamie Huntley
Linesmen:
(Austria) Bettina Angerer
(Slovenia) Nataša Pagon

	0–1	13:29 – Gavrilova (Vafina, Smolentseva)
Johnston (Jenner, Rougeau) (SH) – 20:40	1–1
Krzyzanik (Jenner, Johnstone) – 23:07	2–1
Wakefield (Johnston) – 23:42	3–1
Mikkelson (Saulnier, Wickenheiser) – 24:42	4–1
Mikkelson (Watchorn, Johnston) (PP2) – 25:20	5–1
Krzyzaniak (Wakefield, Jenner) (PP) – 37:05	6–1
Poulin (Jenner) (SH) – 53:19	7–1
Clark (Saulnier, Turnbull) – 57:52	8–1

16 min
Penalties
10 min
33
Shots
14

31 March 2016; 15:30	United States	8–0 (3–0, 0–0, 5–0)	Russia	Sandman Centre, Kamloops; Attendance: 1,323

Game reference

Nicole Hensley
Goalies
Maria Sorokina
Referees:
(Switzerland) Anna Eskola
(Norway) Aina Hove
Linesmen:
(Austria) Bettina Angerer
(Finland) Jenni Heikkinen

Coyne (Pankowski) – 05:07	1–0
M. Lamoureux (Darkangelo, Skarupa) – 06:29	2–0
Keller (Skarupa, Carpenter) – 14:19	3–0
M. Lamoureux (Decker) (PP) – 44:54	4–0
Darkangelo (J. Lamoureux) – 46:19	5–0
Knight (Coyne) – 49:10	6–0
Knight (Coyne, Decker) (PP2) – 56:17	7–0
Pankowski (J. Lamoureux) (PP) – 57:14	8–0

4 min
Penalties
14 min
39
Shots
16

31 March 2016; 19:30	Canada	6–1 (1–0, 4–1, 1–0)	Finland	Sandman Centre, Kamloops; Attendance: 4,234

Game reference

Emerance Maschmeyer
Goalies
Meeri Räisänen
Anni Keisala
Referees:
(Switzerland) Drahomira Fialova
(United States) Jerilyn Glenn
Linesmen:
(United States) Michaela Frattarelli
(France) Charlotte Girard

Poulin (Agosta, Spooner) – 01:04	1–0
Johnston (Fortino, Wakefield) (PP) – 28:01	2–0
	2–1	28:22 – Nieminen (Välilä) (PP)
Jenner (Wakefield, Johnston) – 33:35	3–1
Saulnier (Turnbull) – 34:33	4–1
Wakefield – 36:06	5–1
Wakefield (Johnston, Watchorn) (PP) – 58:18	6–1

10 min
Penalties
12 min
41
Shots
19

=== Group B ===
Pos	Team	Pld	W	OTW	OTL	L	GF	GA	GD	Pts	Qualification
1	Sweden	3	2	1	0	0	7	3	+4	8	Quarterfinals
2	Czech Republic	3	1	1	0	1	8	6	+2	5	Quarterfinals
3	Switzerland	3	1	0	1	1	6	7	−1	4	Relegation round
4	Japan	3	0	0	1	2	4	9	−5	1	Relegation round

Source: IIHF
Rules for classification: 1) points; 2) head-to-head points; 3) head-to-head goal difference; 4) head-to-head number of goals scored; 5) result against closest best-ranked team outside tied teams; 6) result against second-best ranked team outside tied teams; 7) seeding before tournament.

28 March 2016; 13:00	Switzerland	4–2 (1–1, 1–0, 2–1)	Japan	McArthur Island Centre, Kamloops; Attendance: 1,000

Game reference

Florence Schelling
Goalies
Nana Fujimoto
Referees:
(Canada) Melanie Bordeleau
(United States) Jamie Huntley
Linesmen:
(Austria) Bettina Angerer
(Slovenia) Nataša Pagon

Meier (Stalder, Müller) (PP) – 07:33	1–0
	1–1	18:22 – Osawa (Takeda, Adachi)
Stalder (Bullo, Meier) (PP2) – 31:50	2–1
Staenz (Meier) – 41:10	3–1
Meier (Altmann, Bullo) – 47:04	4–1
	4–2	49:47 – Hirano (Yoneyama, Osawa) (PP)

8 min
Penalties
10 min
32
Shots
28

28 March 2016; 17:00	Sweden	3–2 (0–0, 1–1, 2–1)	Czech Republic	McArthur Island Centre, Kamloops; Attendance: 613

Game reference

Sara Grahn
Goalies
Klára Peslarová
Referees:
(Switzerland) Anna Eskola
(Japan) Miyuki Nakayama
Linesmen:
(Finland) Jenni Heikkinen
(Canada) Vanessa Stratton

	0–1	29:14 – Herzigová (Křížová, Hymlarová)
Küller (Rask) (SH) – 37:36	1–1
Olsson (Eliasson, L. Johansson) (PP) – 41:22	2–1
	2–2	47:58 – Lédlová (Vanišová)
Carlsson – 59:52	3–2

8 min
Penalties
6 min
31
Shots
18

29 March 2016; 13:00	Switzerland	1–3 (0–0, 1–2, 0–1)	Czech Republic	McArthur Island Centre, Kamloops; Attendance: 570

Game reference

Florence Schelling
Goalies
Klára Peslarová
Referees:
(Canada) Gabrielle Ariano-Lortie
(United States) Jerilyn Glenn
Linesmen:
(France) Charlotte Girard
(Finland) Jenni Heikkinen

	0–1	21:53 – Vanišová (Horálková) (PP)
	0–2	23:11 – Vanišová
Müller (Meier, Ruegg) (PP) – 27:50	1–2
	1–3	54:25 – Kolowratová (Polenská, Horálková) (PP)

18 min
Penalties
12 min
23
Shots
17

29 March 2016; 17:00	Japan	0–2 (0–0, 0–0, 0–2)	Sweden	McArthur Island Centre, Kamloops; Attendance: 612

Game reference
Nana Fujimoto	Goalies	Sara Grahn	Referees: (Switzerland) Drahomira Fialova (Norway) Aina Hove; Linesmen: (United States) Michaela Frattarelli (Czech Republic) Ilona Novotná
0–1 / 40:59 – Winberg; 0–2 / 45:33 – Eliasson (L. Johansson) (PP)			Referees: (Switzerland) Drahomira Fialova (Norway) Aina Hove; Linesmen: (United States) Michaela Frattarelli (Czech Republic) Ilona Novotná
6 min	Penalties	10 min	Referees: (Switzerland) Drahomira Fialova (Norway) Aina Hove; Linesmen: (United States) Michaela Frattarelli (Czech Republic) Ilona Novotná
16	Shots	35	Referees: (Switzerland) Drahomira Fialova (Norway) Aina Hove; Linesmen: (United States) Michaela Frattarelli (Czech Republic) Ilona Novotná

31 March 2016; 13:00	Czech Republic	3–2 GWS (0–1, 1–0, 1–1) (OT 0–0) (SO: 1–0)	Japan	McArthur Island Centre, Kamloops; Attendance: 782

Game reference

Klára Peslarová
Goalies
Nana Fujimoto
Referees:
(Sweden) Gabriella Gran
(Germany) Nicole Hertrich
Linesmen:
(Sweden) Veronica Johansson
(Finland) Johanna Tauriainen

	0–1	04:55 – Osawa (Shishiuchi, Yoneyama) (PP)
Polenská (Křížová, Hymlarová) – 39:19	1–1
Tejralová (Polenská, Křížová) – 47:48	2–1
	2–2	49:57 – Hori (Adachi)

Polenská (miss)
Pejzlová (miss)
Hymlarová
Povová (miss)
Hymlarová
Herzigová (miss)
Hymlarová
Shootout
(miss) Kubo
(miss) Yoneyama
Osawa
(miss) Osawa
Kubo
(miss) Ono
(miss) Ukita
8 min
Penalties
12 min
33
Shots
28

31 March 2016; 17:00	Sweden	2–1 GWS (0–1, 1–0, 0–0) (OT 0–0) (SO: 1–0)	Switzerland	McArthur Island Centre, Kamloops; Attendance: 874

Game reference
Sara Grahn	Goalies	Florence Schelling	Referees: (Canada) Melanie Bordeleau (Japan) Miyuki Nakayama; Linesmen: (Slovenia) Nataša Pagon (Canada) Vanessa Stratton
/ 0–1 / 04:21 – Raselli (Staenz); L. Johansson (Eliasson, Winberg) (PP) – 39:34 / 1–1			Referees: (Canada) Melanie Bordeleau (Japan) Miyuki Nakayama; Linesmen: (Slovenia) Nataša Pagon (Canada) Vanessa Stratton
Olsson (miss); Borgqvist	Shootout	(miss) Zollinger; (miss) Stalder; (miss) Meier	Referees: (Canada) Melanie Bordeleau (Japan) Miyuki Nakayama; Linesmen: (Slovenia) Nataša Pagon (Canada) Vanessa Stratton
6 min	Penalties	16 min	Referees: (Canada) Melanie Bordeleau (Japan) Miyuki Nakayama; Linesmen: (Slovenia) Nataša Pagon (Canada) Vanessa Stratton
39	Shots	22	Referees: (Canada) Melanie Bordeleau (Japan) Miyuki Nakayama; Linesmen: (Slovenia) Nataša Pagon (Canada) Vanessa Stratton

== Relegation round ==
The third and fourth placed team from Group B played a best-of-three series to determine the relegated team.

1 April 2016; 13:00	Switzerland	3–1 (2–1, 1–0, 0–0)	Japan	McArthur Island Centre, Kamloops; Attendance: 522

Game reference

Florence Schelling
Goalies
Nana Fujimoto
Referees:
(Canada) Gabrielle Ariano-Lortie
(Sweden) Gabriella Gran
Linesmen:
(Sweden) Veronica Johansson
(Finland) Johanna Tauriainen

	0–1	01:49 – Adachi (Hirano, Suzuki)
Stiefel (Staenz, Benz) (PP) – 06:59	1–1
Meier (Stalder, Altmann) – 18:40	2–1
Stalder (Rüegg) (PP) – 22:36	3–1

10 min
Penalties
12 min
27
Shots
15

3 April 2016; 13:00	Japan	0–4 (0–1, 0–2, 0–1)	Switzerland	McArthur Island Centre, Kamloops; Attendance: 791

Game reference

Akane Konishi
Goalies
Florence Schelling
Referees:
(Canada) Gabrielle Ariano-Lortie
(Canada) Melanie Bordeleau
Linesmen:
(Finland) Jenni Heikkinen
(Czech Republic) Ilona Novotná

0–1	08:50 – Raselli (Rüegg, Stalder) (PP)
0–2	31:16 – Stiefel (Meier, Stalder)
0–3	32:30 – Stalder (Waidacher)
0–4	59:22 – Meier (Stalder) (ENG)

6 min
Penalties
6 min
20
Shots
23

Switzerland won series 2–0; Japan were relegated to the 2017 Division I A

== Final round ==
=== Bracket ===
Quarterfinals
A4	Russia	4
B1	Sweden	1
A3	Finland	5
B2	Czech Republic	0

Semifinals
A1	United States	9
A4	Russia	0
A2	Canada	5
A3	Finland	3

Final
A1	United States (OT)	1
A2	Canada	0
Bronze medal game
A4	Russia (GWS)	1
A3	Finland	0

==== Quarterfinals ====
1 April 2016; 15:30	Russia	4–1 (2–1, 1–0, 1–0)	Sweden	Sandman Centre, Kamloops; Attendance: 1,126

Game reference

Nadezhda Morozova
Goalies
Sara Grahn
Referees:
(Switzerland) Anna Eskola
(United States) Jerilyn Glenn
Linesmen:
(Czech Republic) Ilona Novotná
(Slovenia) Nataša Pagon

Pavlova (Sosina, Goncharenko) – 03:40	1–0
	1–1	05:56 – Olofsson (Carlsson) (PP)
Sosina (Goncharenko) – 08:49	2–1
Burina (Pirogova, Sosina) (PP) – 24:49	3–1
Sosina (ENG) – 59:47	4–1

12 min
Penalties
10 min
26
Shots
27

1 April 2016; 19:30	Finland	5–0 (0–0, 3–0, 2–0)	Czech Republic	Sandman Centre, Kamloops; Attendance: 1,256

Game reference

Meeri Räisänen
Goalies
Klára Peslarová
Referees:
(Switzerland) Drahomira Fialova
(United States) Jamie Huntley
Linesmen:
(Austria) Bettina Angerer
(France) Charlotte Girard

Välilä (Karvinen) – 29:19	1–0
Niskanen (Hovi, Jalosuo) (PP) – 36:01	2–0
Hovi (Tuominen, Niskanen) – 39:37	3–0
Karvinen (Hiirikoski, Nieminen) (PP) – 42:07	4–0
Karvinen (Hiirikoski, Välilä) (PP) – 54:27	5–0

8 min
Penalties
12 min
44
Shots
8

==== Semifinals ====
3 April 2016; 15:00	United States	9–0 (5–0, 3–0, 1–0)	Russia	Sandman Centre, Kamloops; Attendance: 2,297

Game reference

Alex Rigsby
Goalies
Anna Prugova
Nadezhda Morozova
Referees:
(Switzerland) Anna Eskola
(Germany) Nicole Hertrich
Linesmen:
(Canada) Vanessa Stratton
(Finland) Johanna Tauriainen

Stack (M. Lamoureux, Pankowski) – 06:59	1–0
J. Lamoureux (Darkangelo, Bozek) – 07:36	2–0
Bozek (Pankowski) – 10:31	3–0
Knight (Bellamy, M. Lamoureux) – 11:20	4–0
Duggan (J. Lamoureux, Hickel) – 19:44	5–0
J. Lamoureux (Knight, M. Lamoureux) – 25:01	6–0
Decker (Knight) (PP) – 37:36	7–0
Stack (Skarupa, Carpenter) (PP) – 39:35	8–0
Knight (Decker, Stecklein) – 41:23	9–0

4 min
Penalties
8 min
40
Shots
17

3 April 2016; 19:30	Canada	5–3 (1–1, 1–0, 3–2)	Finland	Sandman Centre, Kamloops; Attendance: 4,007

Game reference

Charline Labonté
Goalies
Meeri Räisänen
Referees:
(Sweden) Gabriella Gran
(United States) Jamie Huntley
Linesmen:
(Austria) Bettina Angerer
(Sweden) Veronica Johansson

	0–1	07:00 – Valkama
Spooner (Lacquette, Poulin) (PP) – 12:40	1–1
Agosta (Spooner, Lacquette) – 37:29	2–1
Spooner (Poulin) (SH) – 45:38	3–1
	3–2	55:42 – Karvinen (Välilä, Nieminen) (PP, EA)
Turnbull (Fortino) (SH, ENG) – 56:56	4–2
Spooner (Poulin) (SH, ENG) – 57:43	5–2
	5–3	59:27 – Saari (Savolainen)

10 min
Penalties
6 min
39
Shots
19

==== Fifth place game ====
3 April 2016; 17:00	Sweden	4–2 (0–2, 0–0, 4–0)	Czech Republic	McArthur Island Centre, Kamloops; Attendance: 612

Game reference

Sara Grahn
Goalies
Klára Peslarová
Referees:
(United States) Jerilyn Glenn
(Japan) Miyuki Nakayama
Linesmen:
(United States) Michaela Frattarelli
(France) Charlotte Girard

	0–1	07:43 – Polenská (Křížová, Hymlarová)
	0–2	09:40 – Polenská (Ziková, Křížová) (PP)
E. Johansson (Lindh, Borgqvist) – 50:19	1–2
Borgqvist (Lindh, Eliasson) – 51:58	2–2
L. Johansson (Olsson) – 52:24	3–2
Küller (Winberg) (SH, ENG) – 59:08	4–2

10 min
Penalties
10 min
22
Shots
20

==== Bronze medal game ====
4 April 2016; 15:00	Finland	0–1 GWS (0–0, 0–0, 0–0) (OT 0–0) (SO: 0–1)	Russia	Sandman Centre, Kamloops; Attendance: 2,351

Game reference
Meeri Räisänen	Goalies	Nadezhda Morozova	Referees: (Canada) Gabrielle Ariano-Lortie (Canada) Melanie Bordeleau; Linesmen: (Czech Republic) Ilona Novotná (Canada) Vanessa Stratton
Tuominen (miss); Kärnä (miss)	Shootout	Shukina; (miss) Dergachyova; Sosina	Referees: (Canada) Gabrielle Ariano-Lortie (Canada) Melanie Bordeleau; Linesmen: (Czech Republic) Ilona Novotná (Canada) Vanessa Stratton
10 min	Penalties	4 min	Referees: (Canada) Gabrielle Ariano-Lortie (Canada) Melanie Bordeleau; Linesmen: (Czech Republic) Ilona Novotná (Canada) Vanessa Stratton
32	Shots	23	Referees: (Canada) Gabrielle Ariano-Lortie (Canada) Melanie Bordeleau; Linesmen: (Czech Republic) Ilona Novotná (Canada) Vanessa Stratton

==== Final ====
4 April 2016; 19:30	United States	1–0 OT (0–0, 0–0, 0–0) (OT 1–0)	Canada	Sandman Centre, Kamloops; Attendance: 5,850

Game reference
Alex Rigsby	Goalies	Emerance Maschmeyer	Referees: (Switzerland) Anna Eskola (Germany) Nicole Hertrich; Linesmen: (Sweden) Veronica Johansson (Finland) Johanna Tauriainen
Carpenter (J. Lamoureux, Bozek) – 72:30 / 1–0			Referees: (Switzerland) Anna Eskola (Germany) Nicole Hertrich; Linesmen: (Sweden) Veronica Johansson (Finland) Johanna Tauriainen
12 min	Penalties	6 min	Referees: (Switzerland) Anna Eskola (Germany) Nicole Hertrich; Linesmen: (Sweden) Veronica Johansson (Finland) Johanna Tauriainen
34	Shots	32	Referees: (Switzerland) Anna Eskola (Germany) Nicole Hertrich; Linesmen: (Sweden) Veronica Johansson (Finland) Johanna Tauriainen

== Final standings ==
Rank	Team
1st place, gold medalist(s)	United States
2nd place, silver medalist(s)	Canada
3rd place, bronze medalist(s)	Russia
4	Finland
5	Sweden
6	Czech Republic
7	Switzerland
8	Japan

Relegated to the 2017 Division I A

== Statistics and awards ==
=== Scoring leaders ===
List shows the top skaters sorted by points, then goals.

Player	GP	G	A	Pts	+/−	PIM	POS
(United States) Hilary Knight	5	7	2	9	+8	0	F
(Switzerland) Christine Meier	5	4	5	9	+5	0	F
(United States) Jocelyne Lamoureux	5	3	5	8	+8	2	F
(Switzerland) Lara Stalder	5	3	5	8	+5	12	F
(Canada) Rebecca Johnston	5	2	5	7	+3	0	F
(United States) Monique Lamoureux	5	2	5	7	+7	4	D
(Canada) Natalie Spooner	5	3	3	6	+3	2	F
(Canada) Jenn Wakefield	5	3	3	6	+3	4	F
(United States) Brianna Decker	5	2	4	6	+5	2	F
(Canada) Marie-Philip Poulin	5	2	4	6	+4	6	F

GP = Games played; G = Goals; A = Assists; Pts = Points; +/− = Plus/minus; PIM = Penalties in minutes; POS = Position
Source: IIHF.com

=== Leading goaltenders ===
Only the top five goaltenders, based on save percentage, who have played at least 40% of their team's minutes, are included in this list.

Player	TOI	GA	GAA	SA	Sv%	SO
(United States) Alex Rigsby	192:30	1	0.31	72	98.61	2
(Canada) Emerance Maschmeyer	191:23	4	1.25	90	95.56	0
(Switzerland) Florence Schelling	303:49	8	1.58	117	93.16	1
(Sweden) Sara Grahn	301:52	8	1.59	101	92.08	1
(Finland) Meeri Räisänen	346:07	14	2.43	176	92.05	1

TOI = Time on ice (minutes:seconds); SA = Shots against; GA = Goals against; GAA = Goals against average; Sv% = Save percentage; SO = Shutouts
Source: IIHF.com

=== Awards ===
- Best players selected by the directorate:
  - Best Goaltender: (Canada) Emerance Maschmeyer
  - Best Defenceman: (Finland) Jenni Hiirikoski
  - Best Forward: (United States) Hilary Knight

Source: IIHF.com

- All-star team
  - Goaltender: (Finland) Meeri Räisänen
  - Defence: (United States) Monique Lamoureux, (Finland) Jenni Hiirikoski
  - Forwards: (United States) Hilary Knight, (Canada) Rebecca Johnston, (Switzerland) Christine Meier
- MVP: (United States) Hilary Knight

Source: IIHF.com
