= Olivia Carlsson =

Swedish ice hockey player (born 1995)

- Born: 2 March 1995 (age 30) Karlstad, Sweden
- Height: 1.74 m (5 ft 9 in)
- Weight: 73 kg (161 lb; 11 st 7 lb)
- Position: Winger
- Shoots: Left
- SDHL team: MoDo Hockey
- National team: Sweden
- Playing career: 2011–present

Olivia Carlsson (born 2 March 1995) is a Swedish ice hockey player captain of MoDo Hockey Dam of the Swedish Women's Hockey League (SDHL). She has been a member of the Swedish national ice hockey team since 2012.

Carlsson represented Sweden in the women's ice hockey tournament at the 2018 Winter Olympics and in the IIHF Women's World Championships in 2013, 2015, 2016, 2017, and 2019.
