= Nicole Kosta =

Canadian ice hockey player

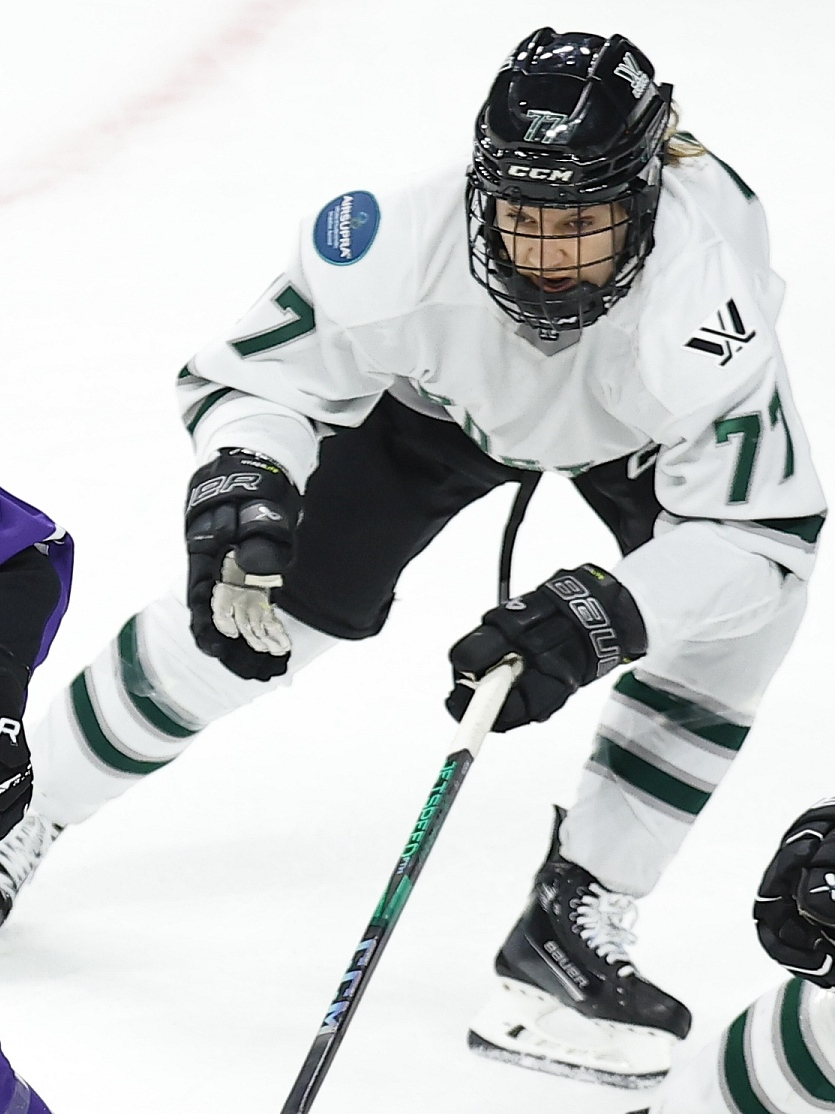
- Kosta with PWHL Boston in 2024
- Born: February 27, 1993 (age 33) Mississauga, Ontario, Canada
- Height: 5 ft 5 in (165 cm)
- Weight: 141 lb (64 kg; 10 st 1 lb)
- Position: Forward
- Shoots: Right
- PWHL team Former teams: Boston Fleet; Connecticut Whale; Markham Thunder
- National team: Canada
- Playing career: 2011–present

Nicole Kosta (born February 27, 1993) is a Canadian professional ice hockey player for the Boston Fleet of the Professional Women's Hockey League (PWHL). She previously played for the Connecticut Whale of the National Women's Hockey League (NWHL) and the Markham Thunder of the Canadian Women's Hockey League (CWHL). She played college ice hockey at Quinnipiac.

== Early life ==
Kosta was born to Steve and Kim Kosta, and has one older brother, Jeff. She attended St. Aloysius Gonzaga Secondary School where she played four sports, including basketball, hockey, soccer and softball.

== College career ==
Kosta began her collegiate career at Quinnipiac during the 2011–12 season. During her freshman year, she recorded eight goals and 25 assists in 34 games. She ranked first on the team in assists and second on the team with 33 points. Her 25 assists and 0.74 assists per game were for third most in the nation among freshmen. During the 2012–13 season, in her sophomore year, she recorded 11 goals and a team-high 28 assists in 34 games. She recorded a program record 11 game point streak from February 11, 2012, to October 13, 2012. Following the season she was named to the All-ECAC Hockey Third Team and an ECAC Hockey Best Defensive Forward award finalist. She missed the 2013–14 season due to injury. During the 2014–15 season, in her junior year, she recorded ten goals and 16 assists in 36 games. She ranked first on the team in assists and third in points with 31. Following the season she was named to the All-ECAC Hockey Third Team for the second time in her career.

During the 2015–16 season, in her senior year, she recorded ten goals and 15 assists in 33 games and helped Quinnipiac win the ECAC Hockey tournament for the first time in program history. On October 10, 2015, in a game against Maine, she became the third player in program history to record 100 career points. Following the season she was named to the All-ECAC Hockey Third Team for the third time in her career. She finished her career at Quinnipiac ranked second in program history in points (123) and assists (84).

== Professional career ==
On May 3, 2016, Kosta signed a one-year contract with the Connecticut Whale of the NWHL. During the 2016–17 season, in her first professional season, she recorded six goals and 11 assists in 18 games.

On August 20, 2017, Kosta was drafted third overall by the Markham Thunder in the 2017 CWHL Draft. During the 2017–18 season she recorded two goals and six assists in 12 games. During the 2018 Clarkson Cup she recorded one goal and three assists in three games. During the championship game she assisted on Laura Stacey's game-winning overtime goal to help the Thunder win the Clarkson Cup. During the 2018–19 season, in the final season of the CWHL, she recorded one goals and five assists in 13 games.

Following the collapse of the Canadian Women's Hockey League, Kosta played four seasons in the Professional Women's Hockey Players Association (PWHPA).

On November 10, 2023, Kosta signed a one-year contract with PWHL Boston. During the 2023–24 season, she recorded one goal and two assists in ten games. Following the PWHL's inaugural trade when Boston acquired Susanna Tapani, Kosta was released from her standard player agreement contract on February 14, 2024, but remained with the team on a reserve player contract. On March 19, 2024, she signed a ten-day standard player agreement with Boston. She appeared in three of the team's first seven games before being placed on the reserve player list. On April 20, 2024, she signed a one-year standard player agreement contract with Boston. Later that day she scored her first career PWHL goal, and had her first multi-point game in a win against PWHL New York.

== International play ==
Medal record

Representing Canada

Women's ice hockey

World U18 Championships
Silver medal – second place	2011 Sweden	

Kosta represented Canada at the 2011 IIHF World Women's U18 Championship where she led the team in scoring with five goals and three assists in five games and won a silver medal. During a preliminary round game against Germany she recorded a hat-trick.

== Personal life ==
In addition to her professional ice hockey career, Kosta is a full-time chiropractor.

== Career statistics ==
=== Regular season and playoffs ===
			Regular season					Playoffs
Season	Team	League	GP	G	A	Pts	PIM	GP	G	A	Pts	PIM
2008–09	Mississauga Jr. Chiefs	Prov. WHL	8	1	2	3	8	—	—	—	—	—
2009–10	Mississauga Jr. Chiefs	Prov. WHL	21	16	16	32	18	2	0	0	0	0
2010–11	Mississauga Jr. Chiefs	Prov. WHL	31	25	35	60	20	2	1	0	1	2
2011–12	Quinnipiac University	ECAC	34	8	25	33	16	—	—	—	—	—
2012–13	Quinnipiac University	ECAC	34	11	28	39	8	—	—	—	—	—
2014–15	Quinnipiac University	ECAC	36	10	16	26	26	—	—	—	—	—
2015–16	Quinnipiac University	ECAC	33	10	15	25	18	—	—	—	—	—
2016–17	Connecticut Whale	NWHL	18	6	11	17	6	1	0	0	0	0
2017–18	Markham Thunder	CWHL	12	2	6	8	2	3	1	3	4	2
2018–19	Markham Thunder	CWHL	13	1	5	6	2	—	—	—	—	—
2020–21	Team Sonnet	PWHPA	4	1	1	2	6	—	—	—	—	—
2021–22	Team Sonnet	PWHPA	5	0	2	2	2	—	—	—	—	—
2022–23	Team Scotiabank	PWHPA	20	4	4	8	12	—	—	—	—	—
2023–24	PWHL Boston	PWHL	10	1	2	3	2	2	0	0	0	0
CWHL totals			25	3	11	14	4	3	1	3	4	2
NWHL totals			18	6	11	17	6	1	0	0	0	0
PWHL totals			10	1	2	3	2	2	0	0	0	0

=== International ===
Year	Team	Event	Result	GP	G	A	Pts	PIM
2011	Canada	U18	2nd place, silver medalist(s)	5	5	3	8	6
Junior totals				5	5	3	8	6
