= Daria Gleißner =

German ice hockey player (born 1993)

- Born: 30 June 1993 (age 32) Kaufbeuren, Germany
- Height: 1.70 m (5 ft 7 in)
- Weight: 71 kg (157 lb; 11 st 3 lb)
- Position: Defence
- Shoots: Left
- DFEL team Former teams: ECDC Memmingen; ESC Planegg
- National team: Germany
- Playing career: 2011–present

Daria Gleißner (born 30 June 1993) is a German ice hockey player and member of the German national team, currently playing in the German Women's Ice Hockey League (DFEL) with ECDC Memmingen.

== Playing career ==
As a member of the German national under-18 team, she participated in the IIHF U18 Women's World Championship in 2009, 2010, and 2011.

Gleißner made her senior national team debut at the 2012 IIHF Women's World Championship and has gone on the represent Germany at the IIHF Women's World Championship in 2013, 2015, 2017, 2019, 2022, and 2023, and at the Group A tournament of the 2016 IIHF Women's World Championship Division I.

Named to the German roster for the women's ice hockey tournament at the 2014 Winter Olympics in Sochi, she sustained a concussion and injury to her cervical vertebrae during a pre-Olympic training match against the United States national team on 5 February 2014. Though she ultimately made a full recovery, the injury rendered her unable to play in the Olympic tournament, which began on 8 February 2014.

She was named team captain for Germany in Ice hockey at the 2026 Winter Olympics – Women's tournament.
