= Saana Valkama =

Finnish ice hockey player (born 1994)

- Born: 27 June 1994 (age 32) Pirkkala, Finland
- Height: 167 cm (5 ft 6 in)
- Weight: 68 kg (150 lb; 10 st 10 lb)
- Position: Left wing
- Shoots: Left
- Played for: AIK IF; Leksands IF; Linköping HC; Vermont Catamounts; Tampereen Ilves; Team Oriflame
- National team: Finland
- Playing career: 2010–present
Medal record
World Championship
Bronze medal – third place	2017 United States

Saana Valkama (born 27 June 1994) is a Finnish ice hockey player, a left winger. She has not played at the elite level since 2023 and was last active with AIK Hockey during the 2022–23 season of the Swedish Women's Hockey League (SDHL) with AIK Hockey.

== Playing career ==
Valkama was a part of the inaugural roster of Team Oriflame Kuortane that debuted in the 2010–11 season of the Naisten SM-sarja (NSMs; called Naisten Liiga during 2017–2024; renamed Auroraliiga in 2024), the Finnish Championship (SM) league for women's ice hockey. Across four seasons with the team, she amassed 45 goals and 34 assists for 79 points in 74 games played, an average of more than one point-per-game.

After completing her studies at the Kuortaneen urheilulukio, she joined the Tampereen Ilves for the 2014–15 Naisten SM-sarja season.

During 2015 to 2019, Valkama played college ice hockey with the Vermont Catamounts women's ice hockey program in the Hockey East (HEA) conference of the NCAA Division I.

Following her graduation from the University of Vermont, Valkama signed with Linköping HC for the 2019–20 SDHL season. She finished the season tied with Zoe Hickel as Linköping's leading goal scorer and ranked second on the team in points, with twelve goals and ten assists in 36 games.

She signed with Leksands IF for the 2020–21 SDHL season. The team struggled to produce throughout the season and, though her point total decreased by half over the previous season, Valkama ranked third of all Leksands players for scoring, with five goals and five assists in 36 games.

Valkama signed with AIK Hockey ahead of the 2021–22 SDHL season and re-signed with the club for the following season. In her first season with AIK, she ranked behind only Lisa Johansson for team scoring, with 21 points in 36 games, and was tied with Sarah-Ève Coutu-Godbout for second on the team goal scoring table, with seven goals.

A number of top players departed from AIK ahead of the 2022–23 season and the team finished second-to-last in the league. Valkama's offensive totals decreased in a reflection of the teams's hardships but she continued her streak as AIK's second leading scorer, accumulating twelve points in 32 games, and tied with teammates Agáta Sarnovská, Aino Karppinen, Isabelle Leijonhielm, and Vilma Nilsson for most goals scored, with five goals. In the relegation series against Skellefteå AIK, Valkama led all AIK players in points and goals scored, totaling three goals and three assists for six points in four games. Her efforts paved the way as AIK successfully defended its place in the SDHL.

== International play ==
As a junior player with the Finnish national under-18 team, she participated in the IIHF Women's U18 World Championship tournaments in 2011 and 2012. She won a bronze medal in 2011 and was selected as a top-three player of the tournament for Finland by the coaches.

Valkama represented Finland at the IIHF Women's World Championship in 2012, 2016, and 2017, winning a bronze medal at the 2017 tournament.
