= Michelle Picard =

American ice hockey player (born 1993)

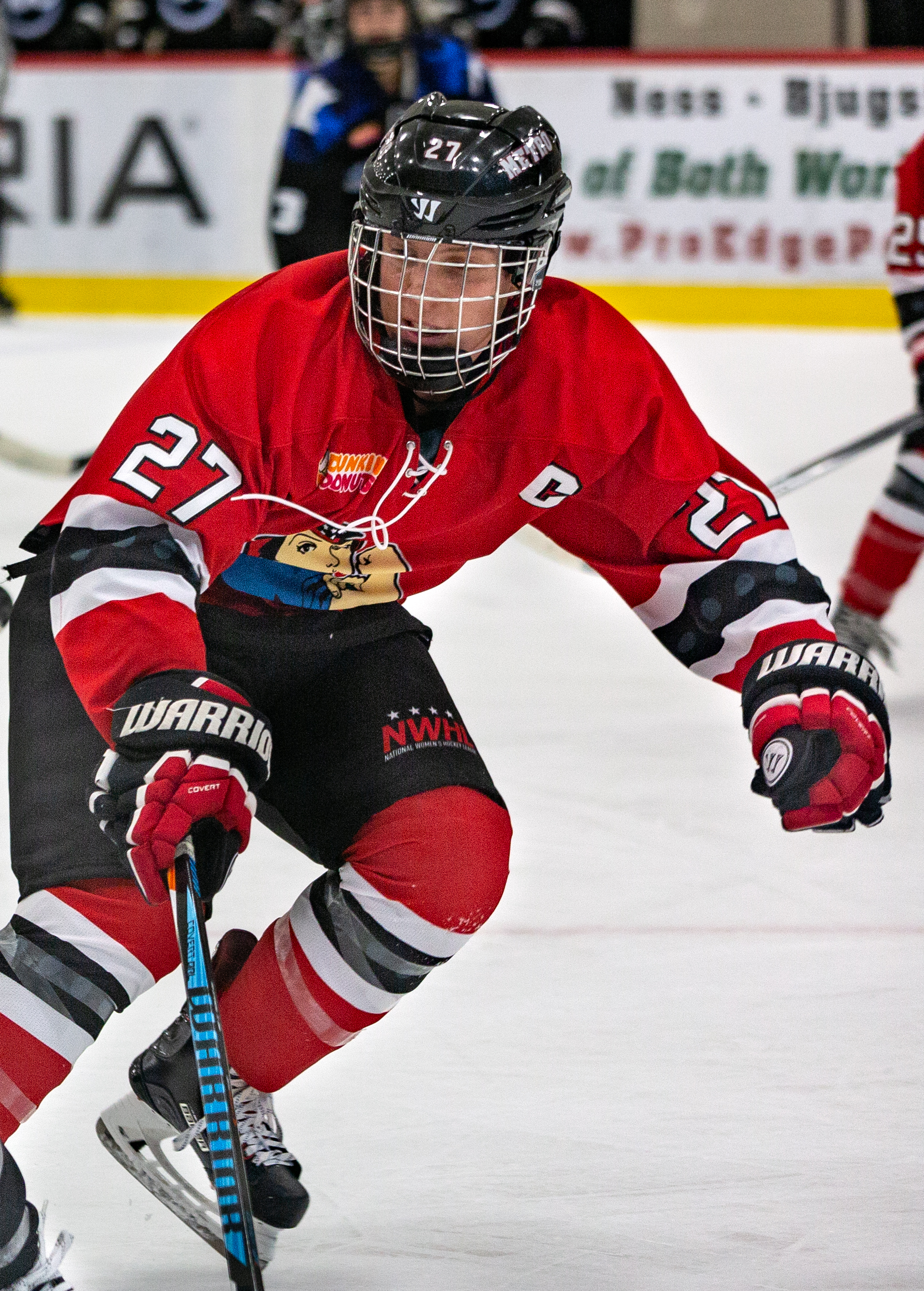
- Picard in 2018
- Born: May 27, 1993 (age 33) Fall River, Massachusetts, U.S.
- Height: 5 ft 4 in (163 cm)
- Weight: 150 lb (68 kg; 10 st 10 lb)
- Position: Defense
- Shot: Left
- Played for: Metropolitan Riveters; Harvard Crimson
- National team: United States
- Playing career: 2011–2019
Medal record
Olympic Games
Silver medal – second place	2014 Sochi	Team
World Championships
Gold medal – first place	2013 Canada
Gold medal – first place	2015 Sweden
Gold medal – first place	2016 Canada
Gold medal – first place	2019 Finland
Silver medal – second place	2012 United States

Michelle "Shelly" Picard (born May 27, 1993) is a retired American ice hockey player who played defense for the United States women's national ice hockey team. Picard also played for the Harvard Crimson and Metropolitan Riveters. She later served as deputy commissioner of the National Women's Hockey League from 2019 to 2021.

== Playing career ==
=== NCAA ===
The first point of her NCAA career came on October 29, 2011, when she assisted on the game-winning goal against the Clarkson Golden Knights. She redshirted her 2013–14 season with the Crimson to play in the 2014 Olympics under her Harvard head coach, Katey Stone. She returned for her junior 2014–15 season and was named team captain, leading the team to the 2015 national championship game where they lost to the Minnesota Golden Gophers. She was also captain in her senior 2015–16 season for the Crimson.

=== USA Hockey ===
She first made the U.S. women's national under-18 team for the 2010 IIHF World Women's U18 Championship, where the team won the silver medal. The next year, Picard was named the team captain of the gold medal-winning U.S. U18 team in the 2011 Championship. Later that year, she made her first appearance with the senior team at the 2011 4 Nations Cup. She was a member of the United States women's national ice hockey team in five IIHF Women's World Championships from 2012 to 2019, as well as the 2014 Sochi Winter Olympics.

=== NWHL ===
After leaving Harvard, Picard signed with the New York Riveters in 2016 for the second season of National Women's Hockey League. She played three seasons with the team, later rebranded as the Metropolitan Riveters, and participated in the 3rd NWHL All-Star Game.

She retired from playing in 2019 and joined the league as deputy commissioner and director of player development. In 2021, she left the league to pursue other opportunities and was replaced by Lisa Haley as director of player development.
