= Aneta Lédlová =

Czech ice hockey player

- Born: 31 December 1996 (age 29) Kadaň, Czech Republic
- Height: 1.70 m (5 ft 7 in)
- Weight: 77 kg (170 lb; 12 st 2 lb)
- Position: Forward
- Shoots: Left
- SWHL team Former teams: AIK IF; HC Litvinov; HC Slavia Praha; Robert Morris Colonials
- National team: Czech Republic
- Playing career: 2012–present

Aneta Lédlová (born 31 December 1996) is a Czech ice hockey player for AIK IF and the Czech national team.

She participated at the 2016, 2017 and 2019 IIHF Women's World Championships. Lédlová outed herself as lesbian.

== Career ==
Note: Does not include current in-progress season per Wikipedia statistics policy.

Season	Team	League	GP	G	A	Pts	PIM
2011–2012	Czech Republic U18	World Junior Classic-18	5	0	2	2	2
2012–2013	Czech Republic U18	World Junior Classic-18	6	1	2	3	10
2012–2013	Czech Republic	Olympic Qualifiers	3	3	0	3	0
2012–2013	Czech Republic	World Cup	5	0	2	2	0
2013–2014	Czech Republic U18	World Junior Classic-18	6	2	0	2	8
2013–2014	Czech Republic	World Cup	5	1	0	1	2
2014–2015	Czech Republic	World Cup Qualifying	3	0	0	0	0
2014–2015	Czech Republic	World Cup	5	2	2	4	2
2015–2016	Czech Republic	World Cup	5	1	0	1	4
2016–2017	Robert Morris	NCAA College Hockey America	31	5	4	9	20
2016–2017	Czech Republic	Olympic Qualifiers	3	2	1	3	0
2016–2017	Czech Republic	World Cup	6	3	3	6	12
2017–2018	Robert Morris	NCAA College Hockey America	23	2	7	9	10
2018–2019	AIK	SDHL	39	11	8	19	51
2018–2019	Czech Republic	World Cup	5	1	0	1	2
Czech Republic (National Team) Total			57	16	12	28	42
Robert Morris University Total			54	7	11	18	30
AIK Total			39	11	8	19	51
Career Total			150	34	31	65	123
