= Yuri Komura =

Japanese ice hockey player

- Born: January 30, 1992 (age 33)
- Height: 1.56 m (5 ft 1 in)
- Weight: 52 kg (115 lb; 8 st 3 lb)
- Position: Goaltender
- Catches: Left
- J-League team: Toyota Cygnus
- National team: Japan

Yuri Komura (born January 30, 1992) is a Japanese ice hockey player for Toyota Cygnus and the Japanese national team. She participated at the 2015 IIHF Women's World Championship.
