= Marie Delarbre =

German ice hockey player (born 1994)

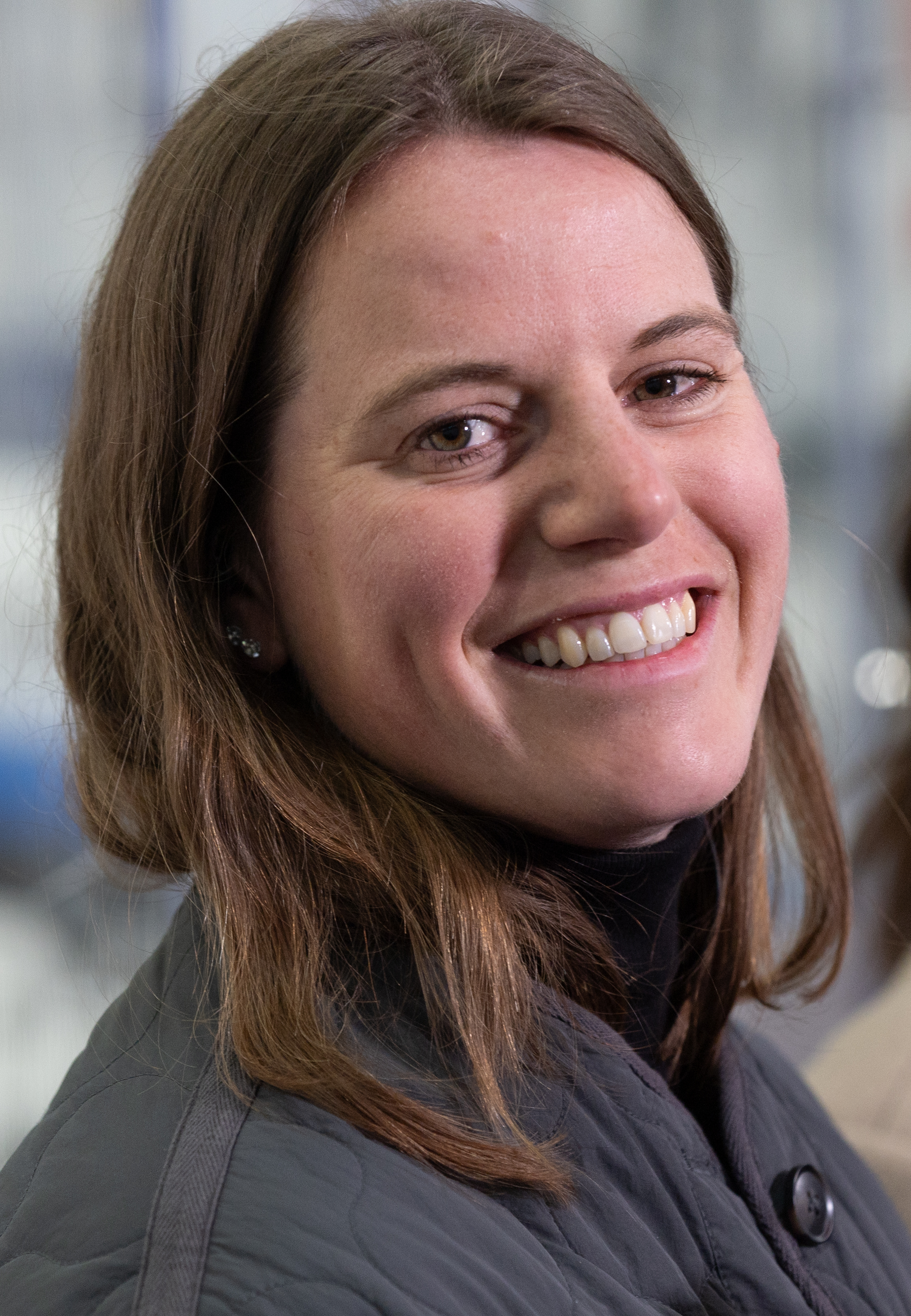
- Delarbre in 2026
- Born: 22 January 1994 (age 32) Aalen, Germany
- Height: 1.72 m (5 ft 8 in)
- Weight: 75 kg (165 lb; 11 st 11 lb)
- Position: Forward
- Shoots: Left
- SDHL team Former teams: Djurgårdens IF: ERC Ingolstadt; ECDC Memmingen; Minnesota Duluth Bulldogs; Merrimack Warriors
- National team: Germany
- Playing career: 2008–present

Marie Delarbre (born 22 January 1994) is a German ice hockey player and member of the German national team, currently playing in the Swedish Women's Hockey League (SDHL) with Djurgårdens IF Hockey Dam.

She represented Germany at the IIHF Women's World Championships in 2013, 2015, 2017, 2019, 2021, and 2022.
