= Dana Trivigno =

American ice hockey player

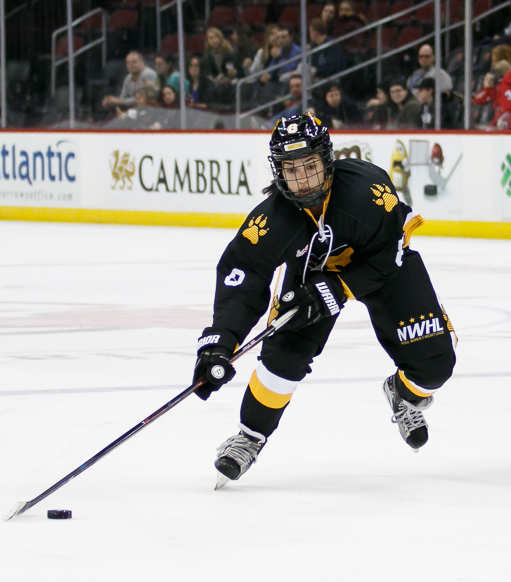
- Dana Trivigno playing for the Boston Pride in 2017
- Born: January 7, 1994 (age 32) Setauket, New York, U.S.
- Height: 5 ft 4 in (163 cm)
- Weight: 134 lb (61 kg; 9 st 8 lb)
- Position: Forward
- Shot: Right
- Played for: Buffalo Beauts; PWHPA; Boston Pride; Connecticut Whale; Boston College
- National team: United States
- Playing career: 2012–2022
Medal record
World Championship
Gold medal – first place	2015 Sweden
Gold medal – first place	2016 Canada

Dana Trivigno (born January 7, 1994) is a former American women's ice hockey player with the Premier Hockey Federation and the American national team.

== Playing career ==
Prior to competing with Boston College, Trivigno attended Shattuck St. Mary's in Faribault, Minnesota. She served as Boston captain in her final season with the university. She graduated as the sixth highest scorer in the university's history.

In the 2015 NWHL Draft, she was selected by the New York Riveters, but chose to sign with the Connecticut Whale instead. She was named to Team Kessel for the 2017 NWHL All-Star Game. After one year with the Whale, she signed for the Boston Pride. She consistently ranked as one of the top players for face-off percentage in her 3 years in the NWHL.

In May 2019, she joined the PWHPA boycott of the 2019–20 season.

In March 2022, she departed the PWHPA and signed with Buffalo of the Premier Hockey Federation (PHF) for the remainder of the 2021–2022 season.

In January 2025, she was inducted into the Women's Beanpot Hall of Fame.

=== International ===
She was named to the roster of the United States national women's ice hockey team that competed at the 2015 IIHF Women's World Championship.

== Personal life ==
Trivigno has served as a referee for Hockey East. She has a degree in finance. Her brother Bobby plays for Brynäs IF in SHL.

Mm.

== Career statistics ==
Season	'GP	G	A	Pts	PIM
2012–13	37	13	16	29	26
2013–14	33	12	16	28	54
2014–15	31	13	18	31	76
