= Suvi Ollikainen =

Finnish ice hockey player

- Born: 6 March 1995 (age 31) Kristinestad, Finland
- Height: 1.63 m (5 ft 4 in)
- Weight: 65 kg (143 lb; 10 st 3 lb)
- Position: Forward
- Shot: Left
- Played for: St. Cloud State Huskies; KJT Kerava; Team Oriflame
- National team: Finland
- Playing career: 2011–2019
Medal record
World Championships
Bronze medal – third place	2015 Sweden

Suvi Ollikainen (born 6 March 1995) is a Finnish ice hockey player. She was a member of the bronze medal-winning Finnish national team at the 2015 IIHF Women's World Championship. Ollikainen also represented Finland at the 2016 IIHF Women's World Championship and 2017 Nations Cup, where she won gold with the team.

During 2015 to 2019, Ollikainen attended St. Cloud State University in St. Cloud, Minnesota and played NCAA Division I ice hockey with the St. Cloud State Huskies, registering three goals and seven assists in 137 games played with the program. She was named to the WCHA All-Academic Team three times and was twice honored as a WCHA Scholar Athlete.

Ollikainen graduated from St. Cloud State in 2019 with a BSc in environmental science. As of 2020, she is pursuing a Master's degree in environmental engineering at Tampere University and she is not currently active with any nationally competitive ice hockey team.
