= Maria Sorokina =

Russian ice hockey player

Maria Sorokina Мария Сорокина
- Born: 19 August 1995 (age 31) Tver, Russia
- Height: 166 cm (5 ft 5 in)
- Weight: 180 kg (397 lb; 28 st 5 lb)
- Position: Goaltender
- Catches: Right
- ZhHL team Former teams: Agidel Ufa; Dynamo St. Petersburg; Connecticut Whale; Metropolitan Riveters
- National team: Russia
- Playing career: 2014–present
Medal record
World Championship
Bronze medal – third place	2016 Canada
Universiade
Gold medal – first place	2017 Astana-Almaty	Ice hockey

Maria Anatolyevna Sorokina (Russian: Мари́я Анато́льевна Соро́кина, romanized: Maríya Anatól'yevna Sorókina; born 19 August 1995) is a Russian ice hockey player and member of the Russian national team, currently playing in the Zhenskaya Hockey League (ZhHL) with Agidel Ufa.

Sorokina represented Russia at the IIHF Women's World Championships in 2015, 2016 and 2017.

== Career statistics ==
=== International ===
Note: GP = Games played; Min, TOI = Minutes played; W = Wins; L = Losses; T,T/OT = Ties; OTL = Overtime losses; GA = Goals-against; GAA = Goals-against average; SO = Shutouts; SV% = Save percentage;

				Regular season
Year	Team	Event	Result	GP	W	L	T/OT	MIN	GA	SO	GAA	SV%
2022	Russia	OG	5th	4	1	2	0	168:15	13	0	4.64	.877
