= Klára Chmelová =

Czech ice hockey player

- Born: August 15, 1995 (age 29); Kadaň, Czech Republic
- Height: 5 ft 11 in (180 cm)
- Weight: 179 lb (81 kg; 12 st 11 lb)
- Position: Forward
- Shoots: Left
- ČSLH team: HC Slavia Praha
- National team: Czech Republic
- Playing career: 2011–present

Klára Chmelová (born August 15, 1995) is a Czech ice hockey player for HC Slavia Praha and the Czech national team.

She participated at the 2017 IIHF Women's World Championship.
