= Eva Byszio =

German ice hockey player (born 1993)

- Born: 25 May 1993 (age 33)
- Height: 1.65 m (5 ft 5 in)
- Weight: 57 kg (126 lb; 9 st 0 lb)
- Position: Forward
- Shoots: Left
- DFEL team: ERC Ingolstadt
- National team: Germany

Eva Byszio (born 25 May 1993) is a German ice hockey player for ERC Ingolstadt and the German national team. She participated at the 2015 IIHF Women's World Championship.
