= Riko Yamaya =

Japanese ice hockey player

- Born: November 27, 1995 (age 29)
- Height: 1.62 m (5 ft 4 in)
- Weight: 60 kg (132 lb; 9 st 6 lb)
- Position: Defence
- Shoots: Left
- J-League team: Mitsuboshi Daito Peregrine
- National team: Japan

Riko Yamaya (山谷 理子, born November 27, 1995) is a former Japanese ice hockey player for Mitsuboshi Daito Peregrine (now Douro Kensetsu-Peregrine) and the Japanese national team. She participated in the 2015 IIHF Women's World Championship.
