= Rebecca Orendorz =

German ice hockey player (born 1993)

- Born: 28 April 1993 (age 32); Iserlohn, Germany
- Height: 1.66 m (5 ft 5 in)
- Weight: 66 kg (146 lb; 10 st 6 lb)
- Position: Defence
- Shoots: Left
- DFEL team Former teams: ESC Planegg; EC Bergkamener Bären
- National team: Germany
- Playing career: 2007–present

Rebecca Orendorz née Graeve (born 28 April 1993) is a German ice hockey player and member of the German national team, currently playing in the German Women's Ice Hockey League (DFEL) with ESC Planegg.

Active with the German national team since 2011, she participated in the IIHF Women's World Championship Top Division tournaments in 2012, 2015, 2017, 2019, and 2021.

In 2020, she married German ice hockey defenseman Dieter Orendorz.
