= Johanna Olofsson =

Swedish ice hockey player

- Born: 13 July 1991 (age 34) Storuman, Sweden
- Height: 1.69 m (5 ft 7 in)
- Weight: 71 kg (157 lb; 11 st 3 lb)
- Position: Defence
- Shoots: Left
- SDHL team: Luleå HF/MSSK
- Played for: Brynäs IF; Modo Hockey
- National team: Sweden
- Playing career: 2007–present

Eva Johanna Carolina Olofsson (born 13 July 1991) is a Swedish professional ice hockey defender for Luleå HF/MSSK in the SDHL and the Swedish national team. She currently holds the record for most games for the Modo Hockey women's team, having played for the club from 2007 to 2019.

== Career ==
Olofsson began play with Modo in the 2007–08 Riksserien season, notching one assist in 13 games. In 2013, she was named Hockey Woman of the Year by the Swedish Ice Hockey Journalists' Association. She would continue to play as one of the club's top defenders for over a decade, serving as an assistant captain from 2011 until her retirement in 2018. After a few months in retirement, however, she would make a comeback to return for the club's 2018–19 season.

In July 2019, she announced that she had signed with Brynäs IF, drawn in part by the presence of former Modo teammate Erika Grahm. After one year with Brynäs, she left the club after being unable to agree on a contract and seeking a new challenge. After speculation linking both her and departing Brynäs forward Michela Cava to a return to Modo, she would sign with Luleå ahead of the 2020–21 SDHL season.

=== International ===
Olofsson made one appearance for the Sweden women's national under-18 ice hockey team, at the IIHF World Women's U18 Championships, in 2009

Since then, Olofsson has made over 160 appearances for the national team, playing at her first World Championships in 2012.

Olofsson was selected for the Sweden women's national ice hockey team in the 2014 Winter Olympics. She played in all six games, scoring one goal. She would fail to put up any points in 6 games at the 2018 Winter Olympics.

== Career statistics ==
=== Club statistics ===
Note: the Riksserien changed its name to the SDHL in 2016.

			Regular season					Playoffs
Season	Team	League	GP	G	A	Pts	PIM	GP	G	A	Pts	PIM
2007–08	Modo Hockey	Riksserien	13	0	1	1	4	4	0	2	2	0
2008–09	Modo Hockey	Riksserien	20	2	0	2	12	7	0	2	2	2
2009–10	Modo Hockey	Riksserien	28	8	2	10	14	5	1	1	2	0
2010–11	Modo Hockey	Riksserien	26	4	8	12	20	2	0	0	0	2
2011–12	Modo Hockey	Riksserien	28	4	6	10	32	3	2	1	3	0
2012–13	Modo Hockey	Riksserien	28	2	3	5	16	3	0	0	0	2
2013–14	Modo Hockey	Riksserien	26	2	13	15	26	3	1	0	1	0
2014–15	Modo Hockey	Riksserien	28	7	14	21	34	5	1	2	3	10
2015–16	Modo Hockey	Riksserien	34	2	14	16	42	3	0	2	2	4
2016–17	Modo Hockey	SDHL	25	5	2	7	20	2	0	0	0	0
2017–18	Modo Hockey	SDHL	36	2	7	9	40	5	0	0	0	2
2018–19	Modo Hockey	SDHL	32	5	11	16	22	6	3	0	3	4
2019–20	Brynäs IF	SDHL	33	3	13	16	18	5	0	3	3	4
SDHL totals			357	46	104	150	300	53	8	13	21	30

=== International statistics ===
Through 2013–14 season

Year	Team	Event	GP	G	A	Pts	PIM
2009	Sweden U18	U18	5	0	0	0	0
2012	Sweden	WW	5	1	0	1	4
2013	Sweden	WW	4	1	0	1	8
2014	Sweden	Oly	6	1	0	1	6
