= Sandra Heim =

Swiss ice hockey goaltender

- Born: 25 June 1995 (age 31) Wilderswil, Switzerland
- Height: 1.65 m (5 ft 5 in)
- Weight: 56 kg (123 lb; 8 st 11 lb)
- Position: Goaltender
- Shoots: Left
- SWHL A team Former teams: ZHC Lions: EV Bomo Thun; MacEwan Griffins; EHC Oberlangenegg
- National team: Switzerland
- Playing career: 2008–present

Sandra "Sandy" Heim (born 25 June 1995) is a Swiss ice hockey goaltender, currently playing in the Swiss Women's League (SWHL A) with the ZHC Lions Frauen. As a member of the Swiss national team, she participated in the 2015 IIHF Women's World Championship.

Her college ice hockey career was played with the MacEwan Griffins women's ice hockey program in the Alberta Colleges Athletic Conference (ACAC) of U Sports during 2015 to 2019.
