= Maria Lindh =

Swedish ice hockey player (born 1993)

- Born: 29 September 1993 (age 33) Stockholm, Sweden
- Height: 5 ft 8 in (173 cm)
- Weight: 139 lb (63 kg; 9 st 13 lb)
- Position: Forward
- Shot: Left
- Played for: Djurgårdens IF; Minnesota Duluth Bulldogs; Modo Hockey; Segeltorps IF
- National team: Sweden
- Playing career: 2007–2018

Ida Maria Christina Lindh (born 29 September 1993) is a Swedish former ice hockey player. Her position was forward.

== International career ==
Lindh was selected for the Sweden women's national ice hockey team in the 2014 Winter Olympics. She played in all six games, recording two assists.

Lindh made one appearance for the Sweden women's national under-18 ice hockey team, at the IIHF World Women's U18 Championships in 2011.

== Career statistics ==
=== Club statistics ===
Note: Riksserien changed its name to the SDHL in 2016.

			Regular season					Playoffs
Season	Team	League	GP	G	A	Pts	PIM	GP	G	A	Pts	PIM
2007–08	Segeltorps IF	Riksserien	1	0	0	0	0	-	-	-	-	-
2009–10	Modo Hockey	Riksserien	19	1	2	3	0	5	0	0	0	0
2010–11	Modo Hockey	Riksserien	24	3	12	15	8	2	0	0	0	2
2011–12	Modo Hockey	Riksserien	28	12	8	20	26	3	2	1	3	2
2012–13	Modo Hockey	Riksserien	21	8	7	15	16	-	-	-	-	-
2013–14	Modo Hockey	Riksserien	20	9	5	14	6	3	2	3	5	2
2014–15	University of Minnesota Duluth	NCAA	15	1	1	2	4	-	-	-	-	-
2015–16	University of Minnesota Duluth	NCAA	36	6	5	11	10	-	-	-	-	-
2016–17	University of Minnesota Duluth	NCAA	37	5	10	15	8	-	-	-	-	-
2017–18	Djurgårdens IF	SDHL	27	5	5	10	10	4	1	0	1	2
SDHL totals			140	38	39	77	66	17	5	4	9	8

=== International ===
Through 2013–14 season

Year	Team	Event	GP	G	A	Pts	PIM
2008	Sweden U18	U18	5	0	2	2	0
2009	Sweden U18	U18	4	3	1	4	2
2014	Sweden	Oly	6	0	2	2	0
