= Kerstin Spielberger =

German ice hockey player (born 1995)

- Born: 14 December 1995 (age 30) Burghausen, Germany
- Height: 1.68 m (5 ft 6 in)
- Weight: 61 kg (134 lb; 9 st 8 lb)
- Position: Forward
- Shoots: Left
- DFEL team: ESC Planegg
- National team: Germany
- Playing career: 2009–present

Kerstin Spielberger (born 14 December 1995) is a German ice hockey player for ESC Planegg and the German national team.

She has participated in several international tournaments, including the 2014 Winter Olympics and the 2015 IIHF Women's World Championship.

== Early life and career ==
Spielberger was born in Burghausen, Germany.

Spielberger was selected for the Germany women's national ice hockey team in the 2014 Winter Olympics. She played in all five games, scoring one goal.

Spielberger also played for Germany in the qualifying event for the 2014 Winter Olympics

As of 2014, Spielberger has also appeared for Germany at two IIHF Women's World Championships, with the first in 2012.

Spielberger made three appearances for the Germany women's national under-18 ice hockey team, at the IIHF World Women's U18 Championships, with the first in 2011.

== Career statistics ==
Through 2013–14 season

Year	Team	Event	GP	G	A	Pts	PIM
2011	Germany U18	U18	5	1	0	1	4
2012	Germany U18	U18	6	8	0	8	4
2012	Germany U18	U18	5	4	0	4	2
2012	Germany	WW	5	0	0	0	4
2013	Germany U18	U18	5	1	3	4	4
2013	Germany	OlyQ	3	0	0	0	0
2013	Germany	WW	5	0	3	3	2
2014	Germany	Oly	5	1	0	1	2
