= Ivonne Schröder =

German ice hockey player

- Born: 25 July 1988 (age 37) Bad Muskau, East Germany
- Height: 1.78 m (5 ft 10 in)
- Weight: 68 kg (150 lb; 10 st 10 lb)
- Position: Goaltender
- Catches: Left
- DFEL team Former teams: Tornado Niesky; OSC Berlin; EHC Jonsdorfer Falken
- National team: Germany
- Playing career: 2007–present

Ivonne Schröder (born 25 July 1988) is a German ice hockey player for Tornado Niesky and the German national team.

She participated at the 2015 IIHF Women's World Championship.
