= Rina Takeda (ice hockey) =

Japanese ice hockey player

- Born: January 16, 1993 (age 33)
- Height: 1.71 m (5 ft 7 in)
- Weight: 67 kg (148 lb; 10 st 8 lb)
- Position: Defence
- Shoots: Left
- J-League team: Mikage Gretz
- National team: Japan

Rina Takeda (born January 16, 1993) is a Japanese ice hockey player for Mikage Gretz and the Japanese national team. She participated at the 2015 IIHF Women's World Championship.
