= Livia Altmann =

Swiss ice hockey player (born 1994)

- Born: 13 December 1994 (age 31) Glarus Süd, Switzerland
- Height: 1.66 m (5 ft 5 in)
- Weight: 65 kg (143 lb; 10 st 3 lb)
- Position: Defence
- Shoots: Left
- ECAC team Former teams: Colgate Raiders; EHC Chur; ZSC Lions
- National team: Switzerland
- Playing career: 2008–present
Medal record
Olympic Games
| Bronze medal – third place | 2014 Sochi | Team |

Livia Altmann (born 13 December 1994) is a Swiss ice hockey player for Colgate Raiders and the Switzerland women's national ice hockey team.

She has represented Switzerland at the Winter Olympics in 2014 and won the bronze medal after defeating Sweden in the bronze medal playoff.
