= 2017 IIHF Women's World Championship rosters =

Each team's roster consists of at least 15 skaters (forwards, and defencemen) and 2 goaltenders, and at most 20 skaters and 3 goaltenders. All eight participating nations, through the confirmation of their respective national associations, had to submit a roster by the first IIHF directorate.

== Group A ==
=== Canada ===
The roster was announced on 27 February 2017.

Head coach: Laura Schuler

No.	Pos.	Name	Height	Weight	Birthdate	Team
1	G	Shannon Szabados	1.73 m (5 ft 8 in)	66 kg (146 lb)	August 6, 1986 (aged 30)	(Canada) Fort Saskatchewan Chiefs
2	F	Meghan Agosta	1.70 m (5 ft 7 in)	67 kg (148 lb)	February 12, 1987 (aged 30)	Free agent
3	D	Jocelyne Larocque	1.68 m (5 ft 6 in)	63 kg (139 lb)	May 19, 1988 (aged 28)	(Canada) Brampton Thunder
5	D	Lauriane Rougeau	1.73 m (5 ft 8 in)	76 kg (168 lb)	April 12, 1990 (aged 26)	(Canada) Les Canadiennes
6	F	Rebecca Johnston	1.75 m (5 ft 9 in)	67 kg (148 lb)	September 24, 1989 (aged 27)	(Canada) Calgary Inferno
8	D	Laura Fortino	1.63 m (5 ft 4 in)	62 kg (137 lb)	January 30, 1991 (aged 26)	(Canada) Brampton Thunder
9	F	Jenn Wakefield	1.78 m (5 ft 10 in)	78 kg (172 lb)	June 15, 1989 (aged 27)	(Sweden) Linköpings HC
12	D	Meaghan Mikkelson	1.75 m (5 ft 9 in)	63 kg (139 lb)	January 4, 1985 (aged 32)	(Canada) Calgary Inferno
17	F	Bailey Bram	1.73 m (5 ft 8 in)	63 kg (139 lb)	September 5, 1990 (aged 26)	(Canada) Calgary Inferno
18	D	Halli Krzyzaniak	1.70 m (5 ft 7 in)	73 kg (161 lb)	February 4, 1995 (aged 22)	(United States) Univ. of North Dakota
19	F	Brianne Jenner – A	1.75 m (5 ft 9 in)	71 kg (157 lb)	May 4, 1991 (aged 25)	(Canada) Calgary Inferno
21	F	Haley Irwin – A	1.70 m (5 ft 7 in)	77 kg (170 lb)	June 6, 1988 (aged 28)	(Canada) Calgary Inferno
23	D	Erin Ambrose	1.65 m (5 ft 5 in)	60 kg (130 lb)	April 30, 1994 (aged 22)	(Canada) Toronto Furies
24	F	Natalie Spooner	1.78 m (5 ft 10 in)	82 kg (181 lb)	October 17, 1990 (aged 26)	(Canada) Toronto Furies
26	F	Emily Clark	1.70 m (5 ft 7 in)	59 kg (130 lb)	November 28, 1995 (aged 21)	(United States) Univ. of Wisconsin–Madison
29	F	Marie-Philip Poulin – C	1.70 m (5 ft 7 in)	73 kg (161 lb)	March 28, 1991 (aged 26)	(Canada) Les Canadiennes
30	G	Emerance Maschmeyer	1.68 m (5 ft 6 in)	64 kg (141 lb)	October 5, 1994 (aged 22)	(Canada) Calgary Inferno
31	G	Geneviève Lacasse	1.73 m (5 ft 8 in)	62 kg (137 lb)	May 5, 1989 (aged 27)	(Canada) Calgary Inferno
36	D	Renata Fast	1.68 m (5 ft 6 in)	65 kg (143 lb)	October 6, 1994 (aged 22)	(Canada) Toronto Furies
37	F	Sarah Davis	1.70 m (5 ft 7 in)	70 kg (150 lb)	June 23, 1992 (aged 24)	(Canada) Calgary Inferno
40	F	Blayre Turnbull	1.70 m (5 ft 7 in)	70 kg (150 lb)	July 15, 1993 (aged 23)	(Canada) Calgary Inferno
43	F	Laura Stacey	1.78 m (5 ft 10 in)	71 kg (157 lb)	May 5, 1994 (aged 22)	(Canada) Brampton Thunder
44	F	Sarah Potomak	1.65 m (5 ft 5 in)	64 kg (141 lb)	December 19, 1997 (aged 19)	(United States) Univ. of Minnesota

=== Finland ===
The roster was announced on 14 March 2017.

Head coach: Pasi Mustonen

No.	Pos.	Name	Height	Weight	Birthdate	Team
2	D	Isa Rahunen	1.65 m (5 ft 5 in)	65 kg (143 lb)	April 16, 1993 (aged 23)	(Finland) Oulun Kärpät
4	D	Rosa Lindstedt	1.86 m (6 ft 1 in)	80 kg (180 lb)	January 24, 1988 (aged 29)	(Sweden) HV71
5	D	Anna Kilponen	1.69 m (5 ft 7 in)	74 kg (163 lb)	May 16, 1995 (aged 21)	(United States) Univ. of North Dakota
6	D	Jenni Hiirikoski – C	1.62 m (5 ft 4 in)	64 kg (141 lb)	March 30, 1987 (aged 30)	(Sweden) Luleå HF
7	D	Mira Jalosuo	1.84 m (6 ft 0 in)	80 kg (180 lb)	February 3, 1989 (aged 28)	(Finland) Oulun Kärpät
8	D	Ronja Savolainen	1.75 m (5 ft 9 in)	72 kg (159 lb)	November 29, 1997 (aged 19)	(Sweden) Luleå HF
9	F	Venla Hovi	1.70 m (5 ft 7 in)	68 kg (150 lb)	October 28, 1987 (aged 29)	(Canada) Univ. of Manitoba
10	F	Linda Välimäki	1.66 m (5 ft 5 in)	70 kg (150 lb)	May 31, 1990 (aged 26)	(Finland) Espoo United
11	F	Petra Nieminen	1.68 m (5 ft 6 in)	62 kg (137 lb)	May 4, 1999 (aged 17)	(Finland) Team Kuortane
12	F	Susanna Tapani	1.77 m (5 ft 10 in)	65 kg (143 lb)	March 2, 1993 (aged 24)	(Finland) Lukko
13	F	Riikka Nieminen – A	1.63 m (5 ft 4 in)	60 kg (130 lb)	June 12, 1973 (aged 43)	(Sweden) HV71
15	D	Minttu Tuominen	1.65 m (5 ft 5 in)	72 kg (159 lb)	January 26, 1990 (aged 27)	(Sweden) Linköpings HC
19	F	Tanja Niskanen	1.76 m (5 ft 9 in)	71 kg (157 lb)	September 11, 1992 (aged 24)	(Finland) KalPa
20	F	Sari Kärnä	1.63 m (5 ft 4 in)	61 kg (134 lb)	April 2, 1988 (aged 28)	(Finland) Ilves
21	F	Michelle Karvinen – A	1.66 m (5 ft 5 in)	69 kg (152 lb)	March 27, 1990 (aged 27)	(Sweden) Luleå HF
22	F	Emma Nuutinen	1.76 m (5 ft 9 in)	74 kg (163 lb)	December 7, 1996 (aged 20)	(United States) Univ. of North Dakota
24	F	Noora Tulus	1.65 m (5 ft 5 in)	68 kg (150 lb)	August 15, 1995 (aged 21)	(Sweden) Luleå HF
26	F	Saana Valkama	1.68 m (5 ft 6 in)	68 kg (150 lb)	June 27, 1994 (aged 22)	(United States) Univ. of Vermont
28	F	Sanni Hakala	1.54 m (5 ft 1 in)	53 kg (117 lb)	October 31, 1997 (aged 19)	(Sweden) HV71
29	F	Sara Säkkinen	1.62 m (5 ft 4 in)	62 kg (137 lb)	April 7, 1998 (aged 18)	(Finland) Team Kuortane
30	G	Anni Keisala	1.75 m (5 ft 9 in)	75 kg (165 lb)	April 5, 1997 (aged 19)	(Finland) Oulun Kärpät
31	G	Eveliina Suonpää	1.74 m (5 ft 9 in)	66 kg (146 lb)	April 12, 1995 (aged 21)	(Finland) Lukko
41	G	Noora Räty	1.65 m (5 ft 5 in)	69 kg (152 lb)	May 29, 1989 (aged 27)	(Finland) Pyry Nokia

=== Russia ===
A 26-player roster was announced on 14 March 2017. The final roster was revealed on 25 March 2017.

Head coach: Mikhail Chekanov / Alexei Chistyakov

No.	Pos.	Name	Height	Weight	Birthdate	Team
2	D	Angelina Goncharenko	1.78 m (5 ft 10 in)	71 kg (157 lb)	May 23, 1994 (aged 22)	(Russia) Tornado Moscow
7	F	Elina Mitrofanova	1.64 m (5 ft 5 in)	57 kg (126 lb)	January 28, 1992 (aged 25)	(Russia) HC Agidel Ufa
8	F	Iya Gavrilova – A	1.70 m (5 ft 7 in)	67 kg (148 lb)	September 3, 1987 (aged 29)	(Canada) Calgary Inferno
9	F	Alexandra Vafina	1.65 m (5 ft 5 in)	58 kg (128 lb)	July 28, 1990 (aged 26)	(Canada) Univ. of Calgary
10	F	Liudmila Belyakova	1.70 m (5 ft 7 in)	64 kg (141 lb)	August 12, 1994 (aged 22)	(Russia) Tornado Moscow
11	D	Liana Ganeyeva	1.65 m (5 ft 5 in)	58 kg (128 lb)	December 20, 1997 (aged 19)	(Russia) Arktik-Universitet Ukhta
12	D	Yekaterina Lobova	1.67 m (5 ft 6 in)	63 kg (139 lb)	October 25, 1998 (aged 18)	(Russia) Biryusa Krasnoyarsk
13	D	Nina Pirogova	1.73 m (5 ft 8 in)	69 kg (152 lb)	January 26, 1999 (aged 18)	(Russia) Tornado Moscow
17	F	Yekaterina Smolentseva	1.70 m (5 ft 7 in)	67 kg (148 lb)	September 15, 1981 (aged 35)	(Russia) HC Agidel Ufa
18	F	Olga Sosina	1.63 m (5 ft 4 in)	73 kg (161 lb)	July 27, 1992 (aged 24)	(Russia) HC Agidel Ufa
21	D	Anna Shukina	1.71 m (5 ft 7 in)	76 kg (168 lb)	November 5, 1987 (aged 29)	(Russia) HC Agidel Ufa
22	D	Maria Batalova	1.74 m (5 ft 9 in)	70 kg (150 lb)	May 3, 1996 (aged 20)	(Russia) Tornado Moscow
24	F	Lidia Malyavko	1.67 m (5 ft 6 in)	62 kg (137 lb)	January 23, 1995 (aged 22)	(Russia) Biryusa Krasnoyarsk
27	F	Fanuza Kadirova	1.62 m (5 ft 4 in)	60 kg (130 lb)	April 6, 1998 (aged 18)	(Russia) Arktik-Universitet Ukhta
31	G	Nadezhda Alexandrova	1.72 m (5 ft 8 in)	62 kg (137 lb)	January 3, 1986 (aged 31)	(Russia) Tornado Moscow
55	F	Galina Skiba	1.63 m (5 ft 4 in)	68 kg (150 lb)	May 9, 1984 (aged 32)	(Russia) Tornado Moscow
59	F	Yelena Dergachyova – A	1.59 m (5 ft 3 in)	59 kg (130 lb)	November 8, 1995 (aged 21)	(Russia) Tornado Moscow
68	F	Alevtina Shtaryova	1.73 m (5 ft 8 in)	65 kg (143 lb)	February 9, 1997 (aged 20)	(Russia) Tornado Moscow
69	G	Maria Sorokina	1.64 m (5 ft 5 in)	62 kg (137 lb)	August 19, 1995 (aged 21)	(Russia) HC St. Petersburg
70	D	Anna Shibanova – C	1.62 m (5 ft 4 in)	62 kg (137 lb)	November 10, 1994 (aged 22)	(Russia) HC Agidel Ufa
92	G	Nadezhda Morozova	1.70 m (5 ft 7 in)	70 kg (150 lb)	November 29, 1996 (aged 20)	(Russia) Biryusa Krasnoyarsk
94	F	Yevgenia Dyupina	1.70 m (5 ft 7 in)	60 kg (130 lb)	June 30, 1994 (aged 22)	(Russia) HC St. Petersburg
97	F	Anna Shokhina	1.70 m (5 ft 7 in)	73 kg (161 lb)	June 23, 1997 (aged 19)	(Russia) Tornado Moscow

=== United States ===
The roster was announced on 8 March 2017.

Head coach: Robb Stauber

No.	Pos.	Name	Height	Weight	Birthdate	Team
2	D	Lee Stecklein	1.83 m (6 ft 0 in)	77 kg (170 lb)	April 23, 1994 (aged 22)	(United States) Univ. of Minnesota
5	D	Megan Keller	1.78 m (5 ft 10 in)	68 kg (150 lb)	May 1, 1996 (aged 20)	(United States) Boston College
6	D	Kali Flanagan	1.65 m (5 ft 5 in)	64 kg (141 lb)	September 19, 1995 (aged 21)	(United States) Boston College
7	D	Monique Lamoureux – A	1.68 m (5 ft 6 in)	70 kg (150 lb)	July 3, 1989 (aged 27)	(United States) Minnesota Whitecaps
8	D	Emily Pfalzer	1.57 m (5 ft 2 in)	57 kg (126 lb)	June 14, 1993 (aged 23)	(United States) Buffalo Beauts
9	D	Megan Bozek	1.72 m (5 ft 8 in)	77 kg (170 lb)	March 27, 1991 (aged 26)	(United States) Buffalo Beauts
10	F	Meghan Duggan – C	1.78 m (5 ft 10 in)	77 kg (170 lb)	September 3, 1987 (aged 29)	(United States) Boston Pride
11	F	Haley Skarupa	1.68 m (5 ft 6 in)	64 kg (141 lb)	January 3, 1994 (aged 23)	(United States) Connecticut Whale
12	F	Kelly Pannek	1.73 m (5 ft 8 in)	75 kg (165 lb)	December 29, 1995 (aged 21)	(United States) Univ. of Minnesota
14	F	Brianna Decker	1.63 m (5 ft 4 in)	67 kg (148 lb)	May 13, 1991 (aged 25)	(United States) Boston Pride
16	F	Kelli Stack	1.65 m (5 ft 5 in)	62 kg (137 lb)	January 13, 1988 (aged 29)	(United States) Connecticut Whale
17	F	Jocelyne Lamoureux	1.68 m (5 ft 6 in)	70 kg (150 lb)	July 3, 1989 (aged 27)	(United States) Minnesota Whitecaps
19	F	Gisele Marvin	1.73 m (5 ft 8 in)	73 kg (161 lb)	March 7, 1987 (aged 30)	(United States) Boston Pride
20	F	Hannah Brandt	1.65 m (5 ft 5 in)	68 kg (150 lb)	November 27, 1993 (aged 23)	(United States) Minnesota Whitecaps
21	F	Hilary Knight	1.80 m (5 ft 11 in)	78 kg (172 lb)	July 12, 1989 (aged 27)	(United States) Boston Pride
22	D	Kacey Bellamy – A	1.70 m (5 ft 7 in)	66 kg (146 lb)	April 22, 1987 (aged 29)	(United States) Boston Pride
25	F	Alexandra Carpenter	1.70 m (5 ft 7 in)	70 kg (150 lb)	April 13, 1994 (aged 22)	(United States) Boston Pride
26	F	Kendall Coyne	1.57 m (5 ft 2 in)	57 kg (126 lb)	May 25, 1992 (aged 24)	(United States) Minnesota Whitecaps
28	F	Amanda Kessel	1.68 m (5 ft 6 in)	59 kg (130 lb)	August 28, 1991 (aged 25)	(United States) New York Riveters
29	G	Nicole Hensley	1.68 m (5 ft 6 in)	75 kg (165 lb)	June 23, 1994 (aged 22)	Free agent
33	G	Alex Rigsby	1.70 m (5 ft 7 in)	70 kg (150 lb)	January 3, 1992 (aged 25)	(United States) Minnesota Whitecaps
35	G	Maddie Rooney	1.68 m (5 ft 6 in)	66 kg (146 lb)	July 1, 1997 (aged 19)	(United States) Univ. of Minnesota Duluth
37	F	Amanda Pelkey	1.60 m (5 ft 3 in)	59 kg (130 lb)	May 29, 1993 (aged 23)	(United States) Boston Pride

== Group B ==
=== Czech Republic ===
The roster was announced on 19 March 2017.

Head coach: Jiří Vozák

No.	Pos.	Name	Height	Weight	Birthdate	Team
1	G	Blanka Škodová	1.76 m (5 ft 9 in)	67 kg (148 lb)	October 1, 1997 (aged 19)	(Czech Republic) LHK Jestřábi Prostějov
2	D	Aneta Tejralová – A	1.64 m (5 ft 5 in)	62 kg (137 lb)	January 4, 1996 (aged 21)	(Russia) HC St. Petersburg
3	F	Klára Chmelová	1.81 m (5 ft 11 in)	81 kg (179 lb)	August 15, 1995 (aged 21)	(Czech Republic) HC Slavia Praha
4	D	Adéla Škrdlová	1.68 m (5 ft 6 in)	54 kg (119 lb)	February 16, 2001 (aged 16)	(Czech Republic) SK Horácká Slavia Třebíč
5	D	Samantha Kolowratová	1.70 m (5 ft 7 in)	68 kg (150 lb)	July 12, 1996 (aged 20)	(United States) Univ. of Vermont
6	D	Petra Herzigová	1.63 m (5 ft 4 in)	62 kg (137 lb)	January 29, 1986 (aged 31)	(Sweden) IF Sundsvall Hockey
7	D	Martina Zedníková	1.70 m (5 ft 7 in)	65 kg (143 lb)	March 28, 1998 (aged 19)	(Czech Republic) Vajgar Hradec
8	F	Kateřina Bukolská	1.70 m (5 ft 7 in)	67 kg (148 lb)	March 6, 1997 (aged 20)	(Canada) Stanstead College
9	F	Alena Polenská – C	1.73 m (5 ft 8 in)	75 kg (165 lb)	June 9, 1990 (aged 26)	(Russia) HC St. Petersburg
10	F	Denisa Křížová	1.65 m (5 ft 5 in)	65 kg (143 lb)	November 3, 1994 (aged 22)	(United States) Northeastern Univ.
11	F	Simona Studentová	1.58 m (5 ft 2 in)	52 kg (115 lb)	August 24, 1986 (aged 30)	(Germany) EC Wilhelmshaven
12	F	Klára Hymlarová	1.61 m (5 ft 3 in)	57 kg (126 lb)	February 27, 1999 (aged 18)	(Czech Republic) HC Slezan Opava
13	F	Lucie Povová	1.72 m (5 ft 8 in)	62 kg (137 lb)	September 16, 1992 (aged 24)	(Czech Republic) HC Litoměřice
15	F	Aneta Lédlová	1.70 m (5 ft 7 in)	75 kg (165 lb)	December 31, 1996 (aged 20)	(United States) Robert Morris Univ.
16	F	Kateřina Mrázová	1.63 m (5 ft 4 in)	64 kg (141 lb)	October 19, 1992 (aged 24)	(United States) Univ. od Minnesota Duluth
17	D	Pavlína Horálková – A	1.66 m (5 ft 5 in)	61 kg (134 lb)	May 24, 1991 (aged 25)	(Russia) Biryusa Krasnoyarsk
18	F	Michaela Pejzlová	1.70 m (5 ft 7 in)	60 kg (130 lb)	June 4, 1997 (aged 19)	(United States) Clarkson Univ.
20	G	Kristýna Bláhová	1.64 m (5 ft 5 in)	66 kg (146 lb)	February 10, 2000 (aged 17)	(Czech Republic) HC Tábor
21	F	Tereza Vanišová	1.69 m (5 ft 7 in)	65 kg (143 lb)	January 30, 1996 (aged 21)	(United States) Univ. of Maine
22	F	Lucie Manhartová	1.73 m (5 ft 8 in)	72 kg (159 lb)	May 14, 1991 (aged 25)	(Sweden) IF Sundsvall Hockey
26	F	Vendula Přibylová	1.71 m (5 ft 7 in)	72 kg (159 lb)	March 23, 1996 (aged 21)	(United States) Univ. of Maine
27	D	Anna Zíková	1.68 m (5 ft 6 in)	62 kg (137 lb)	May 13, 1998 (aged 18)	(Czech Republic) AZ Havířov
29	G	Klára Peslarová	1.63 m (5 ft 4 in)	63 kg (139 lb)	November 23, 1996 (aged 20)	(Sweden) SDE HF

=== Germany ===
The roster was announced on 24 March 2017.

Head coach: Benjamin Hinterstocker

No.	Pos.	Name	Height	Weight	Birthdate	Team
2	D	Tabea Botthof	1.74 m (5 ft 9 in)	69 kg (152 lb)	June 1, 2000 (aged 16)	(Germany) ESC Planegg
3	F	Sophie Kratzer	1.71 m (5 ft 7 in)	72 kg (159 lb)	April 20, 1989 (aged 27)	(Germany) ESC Planegg
5	F	Manuela Anwander	1.64 m (5 ft 5 in)	67 kg (148 lb)	January 9, 1992 (aged 25)	(Germany) Memmingen Indians
7	F	Nina Kamenik	1.61 m (5 ft 3 in)	57 kg (126 lb)	April 27, 1985 (aged 31)	(Germany) OSC Berlin
8	F	Julia Zorn – C	1.70 m (5 ft 7 in)	71 kg (157 lb)	February 6, 1990 (aged 27)	(Germany) ESC Planegg
9	D	Rebecca Graeve	1.65 m (5 ft 5 in)	67 kg (148 lb)	April 28, 1993 (aged 23)	(Germany) EC Bergkamen
10	D	Yvonne Rothemund	1.80 m (5 ft 11 in)	81 kg (179 lb)	September 23, 1992 (aged 24)	(Germany) ESC Planegg
11	F	Nicola Eisenschmid	1.66 m (5 ft 5 in)	65 kg (143 lb)	September 10, 1996 (aged 20)	(Germany) Memmingen Indians
12	D	Anna Fiegert	1.74 m (5 ft 9 in)	73 kg (161 lb)	April 3, 1994 (aged 22)	(United States) Minnesota State Univ.
13	G	Ivonne Schröder	1.77 m (5 ft 10 in)	69 kg (152 lb)	July 25, 1988 (aged 28)	(Germany) Tornado Niesky
14	D	Carina Strobel	1.72 m (5 ft 8 in)	60 kg (130 lb)	September 11, 1997 (aged 19)	(Germany) Memmingen Indians
15	F	Andrea Lanzl – A	1.63 m (5 ft 4 in)	69 kg (152 lb)	October 8, 1987 (aged 29)	(Germany) ERC Ingolstadt
17	D	Lena Düsterhöft	1.78 m (5 ft 10 in)	74 kg (163 lb)	August 26, 1996 (aged 20)	(United States) Minnesota State Univ.
18	F	Bernadette Karpf	1.67 m (5 ft 6 in)	59 kg (130 lb)	July 3, 1996 (aged 20)	(Germany) ESC Planegg
19	F	Kerstin Spielberger	1.68 m (5 ft 6 in)	62 kg (137 lb)	December 14, 1995 (aged 21)	(Germany) ESC Planegg
20	D	Daria Gleissner – A	1.71 m (5 ft 7 in)	71 kg (157 lb)	June 30, 1993 (aged 23)	(Germany) Memmingen Indians
21	D	Ronja Jenike	1.69 m (5 ft 7 in)	70 kg (150 lb)	December 28, 1989 (aged 27)	(Germany) ESC Planegg
22	F	Marie Delarbre	1.72 m (5 ft 8 in)	75 kg (165 lb)	January 22, 1994 (aged 23)	(United States) Merrimack College
23	D	Tanja Eisenschmid	1.72 m (5 ft 8 in)	69 kg (152 lb)	April 20, 1993 (aged 23)	(United States) Minnesota Whitecaps
25	F	Laura Kluge	1.78 m (5 ft 10 in)	62 kg (137 lb)	November 6, 1996 (aged 20)	(Sweden) Linköpings HC
26	D	Anne Bartsch	1.64 m (5 ft 5 in)	62 kg (137 lb)	September 22, 1995 (aged 21)	(Sweden) HV71
30	G	Jennifer Harß	1.76 m (5 ft 9 in)	64 kg (141 lb)	July 14, 1987 (aged 29)	(Germany) ERC Sonthofen
95	G	Franziska Albl	1.67 m (5 ft 6 in)	67 kg (148 lb)	April 29, 1995 (aged 21)	(Germany) TEV Miesbach

=== Sweden ===
The roster was announced on 23 March 2017.

Head coach: Leif Boork

No.	Pos.	Name	Height	Weight	Birthdate	Team
1	G	Sara Grahn	1.70 m (5 ft 7 in)	72 kg (159 lb)	September 25, 1988 (aged 28)	(Sweden) Brynäs IF
3	D	Anna Kjellbin	1.69 m (5 ft 7 in)	62 kg (137 lb)	March 16, 1994 (aged 23)	(Sweden) Linköpings HC
5	D	Johanna Fällman	1.73 m (5 ft 8 in)	72 kg (159 lb)	June 21, 1990 (aged 26)	(Sweden) Luleå HF
6	F	Sara Hjalmarsson	1.76 m (5 ft 9 in)	74 kg (163 lb)	February 8, 1998 (aged 19)	(Sweden) AIK IF
7	D	Johanna Olofsson	1.69 m (5 ft 7 in)	72 kg (159 lb)	July 13, 1991 (aged 25)	(Sweden) Modo Hockey
8	D	Annie Svedin	1.63 m (5 ft 4 in)	69 kg (152 lb)	October 12, 1991 (aged 25)	(Sweden) Modo Hockey
9	D	Jessica Adolfsson	1.75 m (5 ft 9 in)	76 kg (168 lb)	July 15, 1998 (aged 18)	(Sweden) Brynäs IF
10	D	Emilia Ramboldt – C	1.75 m (5 ft 9 in)	71 kg (157 lb)	August 31, 1988 (aged 28)	(Sweden) Linköpings HC
12	D	Maja Nylén Persson	1.62 m (5 ft 4 in)	62 kg (137 lb)	November 20, 2000 (aged 16)	(Sweden) Leksands IF
14	F	Sabina Küller	1.76 m (5 ft 9 in)	78 kg (172 lb)	September 22, 1994 (aged 22)	(Sweden) AIK IF
15	F	Lisa Johansson	1.61 m (5 ft 3 in)	58 kg (128 lb)	April 11, 1992 (aged 24)	(Sweden) AIK IF
16	F	Pernilla Winberg – A	1.65 m (5 ft 5 in)	68 kg (150 lb)	February 24, 1989 (aged 28)	(Sweden) Linköpings HC
18	F	Anna Borgqvist – A	1.63 m (5 ft 4 in)	65 kg (143 lb)	June 11, 1992 (aged 24)	(Sweden) Brynäs IF
19	F	Maria Lindh	1.72 m (5 ft 8 in)	63 kg (139 lb)	September 23, 1993 (aged 23)	(United States) Univ. of Minnesota Duluth
20	F	Fanny Rask	1.68 m (5 ft 6 in)	69 kg (152 lb)	May 21, 1991 (aged 25)	(Sweden) HV71
21	F	Erica Udén Johansson	1.71 m (5 ft 7 in)	71 kg (157 lb)	July 20, 1989 (aged 27)	(Sweden) IF Sundsvall Hockey
24	F	Erika Grahm	1.74 m (5 ft 9 in)	77 kg (170 lb)	January 26, 1991 (aged 26)	(Sweden) Modo Hockey
26	F	Hanna Olsson	1.72 m (5 ft 8 in)	69 kg (152 lb)	January 20, 1999 (aged 18)	(Sweden) Djurgårdens IF Hockey
27	F	Emma Nordin	1.68 m (5 ft 6 in)	73 kg (161 lb)	March 22, 1991 (aged 26)	(Sweden) Luleå HF
28	F	Michelle Löwenhielm	1.72 m (5 ft 8 in)	64 kg (141 lb)	March 22, 1995 (aged 22)	(United States) Univ. of Minnesota Duluth
29	F	Olivia Carlsson	1.74 m (5 ft 9 in)	70 kg (150 lb)	March 2, 1995 (aged 22)	(Sweden) Modo Hockey
30	G	Lovisa Berndtsson	1.66 m (5 ft 5 in)	66 kg (146 lb)	December 9, 1988 (aged 28)	(Sweden) Djurgårdens IF Hockey
35	G	Sarah Berglind	1.63 m (5 ft 4 in)	64 kg (141 lb)	February 10, 1996 (aged 21)	(Sweden) Modo Hockey

=== Switzerland ===
The roster was announced on 2 March 2017.

Head coach: Daniela Diaz

No.	Pos.	Name	Height	Weight	Birthdate	Team
3	D	Sarah Forster	1.69 m (5 ft 7 in)	64 kg (141 lb)	March 19, 1993 (aged 24)	(Switzerland) HC Université Neuchâtel
6	D	Céline Abgottspon	1.73 m (5 ft 8 in)	76 kg (168 lb)	November 24, 1995 (aged 21)	(Switzerland) HC Lugano
7	F	Lara Stalder	1.67 m (5 ft 6 in)	63 kg (139 lb)	May 15, 1994 (aged 22)	(United States) Univ. of Minnesota Duluth
9	D	Shannon Sigrist	1.69 m (5 ft 7 in)	62 kg (137 lb)	April 20, 1999 (aged 17)	(Switzerland) ZSC Lions
11	D	Sabrina Zollinger – A	1.65 m (5 ft 5 in)	64 kg (141 lb)	March 27, 1993 (aged 24)	(Switzerland) ZSC Lions
12	F	Lisa Rüedi	1.67 m (5 ft 6 in)	64 kg (141 lb)	November 3, 2000 (aged 16)	(Switzerland) EHC Dübendorf
14	F	Evelina Raselli – A	1.69 m (5 ft 7 in)	64 kg (141 lb)	May 3, 1992 (aged 24)	(Switzerland) HC Lugano
15	F	Monika Waidacher	1.72 m (5 ft 8 in)	70 kg (150 lb)	July 9, 1990 (aged 26)	(Switzerland) ZSC Lions
18	F	Tess Allemann	1.67 m (5 ft 6 in)	63 kg (139 lb)	April 7, 1998 (aged 18)	(Switzerland) SCL Tigers
19	D	Christine Meier	1.69 m (5 ft 7 in)	70 kg (150 lb)	May 24, 1986 (aged 30)	(Switzerland) ZSC Lions
21	D	Laura Benz	1.72 m (5 ft 8 in)	63 kg (139 lb)	August 25, 1992 (aged 24)	(Switzerland) ZSC Lions
22	D	Livia Altmann – C	1.65 m (5 ft 5 in)	64 kg (141 lb)	December 13, 1994 (aged 22)	(United States) Colgate Univ.
23	D	Nicole Bullo	1.58 m (5 ft 2 in)	55 kg (121 lb)	July 18, 1987 (aged 29)	(Switzerland) HC Lugano
24	F	Isabel Waidacher	1.62 m (5 ft 4 in)	56 kg (123 lb)	July 25, 1994 (aged 22)	(Switzerland) ZSC Lions
25	F	Alina Müller	1.67 m (5 ft 6 in)	60 kg (130 lb)	March 12, 1998 (aged 19)	(Switzerland) Kloten Flyers
26	F	Dominique Rüegg	1.73 m (5 ft 8 in)	72 kg (159 lb)	February 5, 1996 (aged 21)	(Switzerland) ZSC Lions
28	F	Rahel Enzler	1.65 m (5 ft 5 in)	65 kg (143 lb)	July 30, 2000 (aged 16)	(Switzerland) HC Innerschwyz Future
29	G	Janine Alder	1.65 m (5 ft 5 in)	60 kg (130 lb)	July 5, 1995 (aged 21)	(United States) St. Cloud State Univ.
31	G	Andrea Brändli	1.78 m (5 ft 10 in)	65 kg (143 lb)	June 5, 1997 (aged 19)	(Switzerland) Young Lions Hockey Thurgau
41	G	Florence Schelling	1.75 m (5 ft 9 in)	65 kg (143 lb)	March 9, 1989 (aged 28)	(Sweden) Linköpings HC
63	F	Anja Stiefel	1.60 m (5 ft 3 in)	62 kg (137 lb)	August 9, 1990 (aged 26)	(Sweden) Luleå HF
88	F	Phoebe Staenz	1.64 m (5 ft 5 in)	59 kg (130 lb)	January 7, 1994 (aged 23)	(United States) Yale Univ.
92	F	Sandra Thalmann	1.63 m (5 ft 4 in)	72 kg (159 lb)	December 18, 1992 (aged 24)	(Switzerland) SC Reinach
