= 2016 IIHF Women's World Championship rosters =

Each team's roster consisted of at least 15 skaters (forwards, and defencemen) and 2 goaltenders, and at most 20 skaters and 3 goaltenders. All eight participating nations, through the confirmation of their respective national associations, had to submit a roster by the first IIHF directorate.

== Group A ==
=== Canada ===
A 32-player roster was announced on 21 January 2016. The final squad was revealed on 29 February 2016.

Head coach: Laura Schuler

No.	Pos.	Name	Height	Weight	Birthdate	Team
2	F	Meghan Agosta – A	1.70 m (5 ft 7 in)	67 kg (148 lb)	February 12, 1987 (aged 29)	Free agent
3	D	Jocelyne Larocque	1.68 m (5 ft 6 in)	63 kg (139 lb)	May 19, 1988 (aged 27)	(Canada) Brampton Thunder
4	D	Brigitte Lacquette	1.68 m (5 ft 6 in)	82 kg (181 lb)	November 10, 1992 (aged 23)	(Canada) Calgary Inferno
5	D	Lauriane Rougeau	1.73 m (5 ft 8 in)	76 kg (168 lb)	April 12, 1990 (aged 25)	(Canada) Les Canadiennes
6	F	Rebecca Johnston	1.75 m (5 ft 9 in)	67 kg (148 lb)	September 24, 1989 (aged 26)	(Canada) Calgary Inferno
7	F	Jamie Lee Rattray	1.68 m (5 ft 6 in)	78 kg (172 lb)	September 30, 1992 (aged 23)	(Canada) Brampton Thunder
8	D	Laura Fortino	1.63 m (5 ft 4 in)	62 kg (137 lb)	January 30, 1991 (aged 25)	(Canada) Brampton Thunder
9	F	Jennifer Wakefield	1.78 m (5 ft 10 in)	78 kg (172 lb)	June 15, 1989 (aged 26)	(Sweden) Linköpings HC
11	F	Jillian Saulnier	1.65 m (5 ft 5 in)	65 kg (143 lb)	March 7, 1992 (aged 24)	(Canada) Calgary Inferno
12	D	Meaghan Mikkelson – A	1.75 m (5 ft 9 in)	63 kg (139 lb)	January 4, 1985 (aged 31)	(Canada) Calgary Inferno
17	F	Bailey Bram	1.73 m (5 ft 8 in)	63 kg (139 lb)	September 5, 1990 (aged 25)	(Canada) Calgary Inferno
19	F	Brianne Jenner	1.75 m (5 ft 9 in)	71 kg (157 lb)	May 4, 1991 (aged 24)	(Canada) Calgary Inferno
22	F	Hayley Wickenheiser	1.78 m (5 ft 10 in)	73 kg (161 lb)	August 12, 1978 (aged 37)	(Canada) Calgary Inferno
24	F	Natalie Spooner	1.78 m (5 ft 10 in)	82 kg (181 lb)	October 17, 1990 (aged 25)	(Canada) Toronto Furies
27	D	Tara Watchorn	1.78 m (5 ft 10 in)	80 kg (180 lb)	May 30, 1990 (aged 25)	(United States) Boston Blades
29	F	Marie-Philip Poulin – C	1.70 m (5 ft 7 in)	73 kg (161 lb)	March 28, 1991 (aged 25)	(Canada) Les Canadiennes
30	G	Emerance Maschmeyer	1.68 m (5 ft 6 in)	64 kg (141 lb)	October 5, 1994 (aged 21)	(United States) Harvard Univ.
32	G	Charline Labonté	1.75 m (5 ft 9 in)	71 kg (157 lb)	October 15, 1982 (aged 33)	(Canada) Les Canadiennes
33	G	Erica Howe	1.75 m (5 ft 9 in)	69 kg (152 lb)	July 17, 1992 (aged 23)	(Canada) Brampton Thunder
37	F	Sarah Davis	1.70 m (5 ft 7 in)	69 kg (152 lb)	June 23, 1992 (aged 23)	(Canada) Calgary Inferno
38	D	Halli Krzyzaniak	1.70 m (5 ft 7 in)	73 kg (161 lb)	February 4, 1995 (aged 21)	(United States) Univ. of North Dakota
39	F	Emily Clark	1.70 m (5 ft 7 in)	59 kg (130 lb)	November 28, 1995 (aged 20)	(United States) Univ. of Wisconsin–Madison
40	F	Blayre Turnbull	1.70 m (5 ft 7 in)	70 kg (150 lb)	July 13, 1993 (aged 22)	(Canada) Calgary Inferno

=== Finland ===
The roster was announced on 10 March 2016.

Head coach: Pasi Mustonen

No.	Pos.	Name	Height	Weight	Birthdate	Team
1	G	Tiina Ranne	1.65 m (5 ft 5 in)	62 kg (137 lb)	December 6, 1994 (aged 21)	(Finland) JYP Jyväskylä
4	D	Rosa Lindstedt	1.86 m (6 ft 1 in)	79 kg (174 lb)	January 24, 1988 (aged 28)	(Finland) JYP Jyväskylä
5	D	Anna Kilponen	1.69 m (5 ft 7 in)	74 kg (163 lb)	May 16, 1995 (aged 20)	(United States) Univ. of North Dakota
6	D	Jenni Hiirikoski – C	1.62 m (5 ft 4 in)	61 kg (134 lb)	March 30, 1987 (aged 28)	(Finland) JYP Jyväskylä
7	D	Mira Jalosuo	1.84 m (6 ft 0 in)	79 kg (174 lb)	February 3, 1989 (aged 27)	(Sweden) Luleå HF
8	D	Ronja Savolainen	1.75 m (5 ft 9 in)	69 kg (152 lb)	November 29, 1997 (aged 18)	(Finland) Espoo Blues
9	F	Venla Hovi	1.70 m (5 ft 7 in)	67 kg (148 lb)	August 1, 1989 (aged 26)	(Canada) Univ. of Manitoba
10	D	Ella Viitasuo	1.72 m (5 ft 8 in)	69 kg (152 lb)	May 27, 1996 (aged 19)	(Finland) JYP Jyväskylä
11	F	Petra Nieminen	1.69 m (5 ft 7 in)	62 kg (137 lb)	May 4, 1999 (aged 16)	(Finland) Team Kuortane
13	F	Riikka Välilä – A	1.63 m (5 ft 4 in)	60 kg (130 lb)	June 12, 1973 (aged 42)	(Finland) JYP Jyväskylä
14	F	Sanni Hakala	1.54 m (5 ft 1 in)	52 kg (115 lb)	October 31, 1997 (aged 18)	(Finland) JYP Jyväskylä
15	D	Minttu Tuominen	1.65 m (5 ft 5 in)	74 kg (163 lb)	January 26, 1990 (aged 26)	(Finland) Espoo Blues
16	F	Vilma Tanskanen	1.75 m (5 ft 9 in)	72 kg (159 lb)	April 14, 1995 (aged 20)	(United States) Univ. of North Dakota
18	G	Meeri Räisänen	1.70 m (5 ft 7 in)	64 kg (141 lb)	December 2, 1989 (aged 26)	(Finland) JYP Jyväskylä
19	F	Tanja Niskanen	1.76 m (5 ft 9 in)	72 kg (159 lb)	September 11, 1992 (aged 23)	(Finland) JYP Jyväskylä
20	F	Sari Kärnä	1.64 m (5 ft 5 in)	62 kg (137 lb)	April 2, 1988 (aged 27)	(Finland) JYP Jyväskylä
21	F	Michelle Karvinen – A	1.66 m (5 ft 5 in)	69 kg (152 lb)	March 27, 1990 (aged 26)	(Sweden) Luleå HF
23	F	Sara Säkkinen	1.62 m (5 ft 4 in)	61 kg (134 lb)	April 7, 1998 (aged 17)	(Finland) Team Kuortane
24	F	Noora Tulus	1.65 m (5 ft 5 in)	66 kg (146 lb)	August 15, 1995 (aged 20)	(Sweden) Luleå HF
25	F	Suvi Ollikainen	1.63 m (5 ft 4 in)	64 kg (141 lb)	March 6, 1995 (aged 21)	(United States) St. Cloud State Univ.
26	F	Saana Valkama	1.68 m (5 ft 6 in)	69 kg (152 lb)	June 27, 1994 (aged 21)	(United States) Univ. of Vermont
27	F	Saila Saari	1.70 m (5 ft 7 in)	63 kg (139 lb)	November 1, 1989 (aged 26)	(Finland) JYP Jyväskylä
31	G	Anni Keisala	1.75 m (5 ft 9 in)	76 kg (168 lb)	April 5, 1997 (aged 18)	(Finland) Team Kuortane

=== Russia ===
A 32-player roster was announced on 4 March 2016. The final squad was revealed on 22 March 2016.

Head coach: Mikhail Chekanov

No.	Pos.	Name	Height	Weight	Birthdate	Team
1	G	Nadezhda Morozova	1.70 m (5 ft 7 in)	70 kg (150 lb)	November 29, 1996 (aged 19)	(Russia) Biryusa Krasnoyarsk
2	D	Angelina Goncharenko	1.78 m (5 ft 10 in)	71 kg (157 lb)	May 23, 1994 (aged 21)	(Russia) Tornado Moscow
3	F	Fanuza Kadirova	1.62 m (5 ft 4 in)	60 kg (130 lb)	April 6, 1998 (aged 17)	(Russia) Arktik-Univ. Ukhta
4	D	Yekaterina Nikolayeva	1.65 m (5 ft 5 in)	66 kg (146 lb)	October 5, 1995 (aged 20)	(Russia) HC St. Petersburg
7	F	Elina Mitrofanova	1.63 m (5 ft 4 in)	55 kg (121 lb)	January 28, 1992 (aged 24)	(Russia) HC Agidel Ufa
8	F	Iya Gavrilova – A	1.73 m (5 ft 8 in)	67 kg (148 lb)	September 3, 1987 (aged 28)	(Canada) Univ. of Calgary
9	F	Alexandra Vafina	1.65 m (5 ft 5 in)	58 kg (128 lb)	July 28, 1990 (aged 25)	(Canada) Univ. of Calgary
10	F	Liudmila Belyakova	1.69 m (5 ft 7 in)	67 kg (148 lb)	August 12, 1994 (aged 21)	(United States) New York Riveters
13	D	Nina Pirogova	1.73 m (5 ft 8 in)	69 kg (152 lb)	January 26, 1999 (aged 17)	(Russia) Tornado Moscow
15	F	Valeria Pavlova	1.75 m (5 ft 9 in)	75 kg (165 lb)	April 15, 1995 (aged 20)	(Russia) Biryusa Krasnoyarsk
16	F	Yelena Silina	1.64 m (5 ft 5 in)	58 kg (128 lb)	June 20, 1987 (aged 28)	(Russia) Nizhni Novgorod
17	F	Yekaterina Smolentseva – A	1.70 m (5 ft 7 in)	67 kg (148 lb)	September 15, 1981 (aged 34)	(United States) Connecticut Whale
18	F	Olga Sosina	1.63 m (5 ft 4 in)	73 kg (161 lb)	July 27, 1992 (aged 23)	(Russia) HC Agidel Ufa
21	D	Anna Shukina – C	1.71 m (5 ft 7 in)	82 kg (181 lb)	November 5, 1987 (aged 28)	(Russia) HC St. Petersburg
23	F	Tatiana Burina	1.64 m (5 ft 5 in)	70 kg (150 lb)	March 20, 1980 (aged 36)	(Russia) Tornado Moscow
24	F	Alevtina Shtaryova	1.73 m (5 ft 8 in)	67 kg (148 lb)	February 9, 1997 (aged 19)	(Russia) Tornado Moscow
26	F	Yelena Dergachyova	1.59 m (5 ft 3 in)	59 kg (130 lb)	November 8, 1995 (aged 20)	(Russia) Tornado Moscow
31	G	Anna Prugova	1.75 m (5 ft 9 in)	62 kg (137 lb)	November 20, 1993 (aged 22)	(Russia) HC St. Petersburg
33	G	Maria Sorokina	1.65 m (5 ft 5 in)	58 kg (128 lb)	August 19, 1995 (aged 20)	(Russia) HC St. Petersburg
44	D	Alexandra Kapustina	1.68 m (5 ft 6 in)	73 kg (161 lb)	April 7, 1984 (aged 31)	(Russia) HC Agidel Ufa
55	F	Galina Skiba	1.63 m (5 ft 4 in)	68 kg (150 lb)	May 9, 1984 (aged 31)	(Russia) Tornado Moscow
70	D	Anna Shibanova	1.62 m (5 ft 4 in)	62 kg (137 lb)	November 10, 1994 (aged 21)	(Russia) HC Agidel Ufa
88	F	Yekaterina Smolina	1.62 m (5 ft 4 in)	59 kg (130 lb)	October 8, 1988 (aged 27)	(Russia) HC St. Petersburg

=== United States ===
The roster was announced on 24 February 2016.

Head coach: Ken Klee

No.	Pos.	Name	Height	Weight	Birthdate	Team
2	D	Lee Stecklein	1.83 m (6 ft 0 in)	77 kg (170 lb)	April 23, 1994 (aged 21)	(United States) Univ. of Minnesota
5	D	Megan Keller	1.77 m (5 ft 10 in)	68 kg (150 lb)	May 1, 1996 (aged 19)	(United States) Boston College
7	D	Monique Lamoureux – A	1.67 m (5 ft 6 in)	70 kg (150 lb)	July 3, 1989 (aged 26)	(United States) Minnesota Whitecaps
8	D	Emily Pfalzer	1.57 m (5 ft 2 in)	57 kg (126 lb)	June 14, 1993 (aged 22)	(United States) Buffalo Beauts
9	D	Megan Bozek	1.74 m (5 ft 9 in)	77 kg (170 lb)	March 27, 1991 (aged 25)	(United States) Buffalo Beauts
10	F	Meghan Duggan – C	1.77 m (5 ft 10 in)	73 kg (161 lb)	September 3, 1987 (aged 28)	(United States) Buffalo Beauts
11	F	Haley Skarupa	1.67 m (5 ft 6 in)	64 kg (141 lb)	January 3, 1994 (aged 22)	(United States) Boston College
14	F	Brianna Decker	1.63 m (5 ft 4 in)	67 kg (148 lb)	May 13, 1991 (aged 24)	(United States) Boston Pride
16	F	Kelli Stack	1.63 m (5 ft 4 in)	61 kg (134 lb)	January 13, 1988 (aged 28)	(United States) Connecticut Whale
17	F	Jocelyne Lamoureux	1.67 m (5 ft 6 in)	70 kg (150 lb)	July 3, 1989 (aged 26)	(United States) Minnesota Whitecaps
21	F	Hilary Knight	1.80 m (5 ft 11 in)	78 kg (172 lb)	July 12, 1989 (aged 26)	(United States) Boston Pride
22	D	Kacey Bellamy – A	1.70 m (5 ft 7 in)	66 kg (146 lb)	April 22, 1987 (aged 28)	(United States) Boston Pride
23	D	Michelle Picard	1.63 m (5 ft 4 in)	68 kg (150 lb)	June 19, 1992 (aged 23)	(United States) Harvard Univ.
24	F	Shiann Darkangelo	1.75 m (5 ft 9 in)	66 kg (146 lb)	November 28, 1993 (aged 22)	(United States) Connecticut Whale
25	F	Alexandra Carpenter	1.70 m (5 ft 7 in)	70 kg (150 lb)	April 13, 1994 (aged 21)	(United States) Boston College
26	F	Kendall Coyne	1.57 m (5 ft 2 in)	57 kg (126 lb)	May 25, 1992 (aged 23)	(United States) Northeastern Univ.
27	F	Annie Pankowski	1.74 m (5 ft 9 in)	70 kg (150 lb)	November 4, 1994 (aged 21)	(United States) Univ. of Wisconsin–Madison
30	G	Nicole Hensley	1.67 m (5 ft 6 in)	70 kg (150 lb)	June 23, 1994 (aged 21)	(United States) Lindenwood Univ.
31	G	Jessica Vetter	1.74 m (5 ft 9 in)	70 kg (150 lb)	December 19, 1985 (aged 30)	(United States) Minnesota Whitecaps
32	F	Dana Trivigno	1.63 m (5 ft 4 in)	61 kg (134 lb)	January 7, 1994 (aged 22)	(United States) Boston College
33	G	Alex Rigsby	1.70 m (5 ft 7 in)	70 kg (150 lb)	January 3, 1992 (aged 24)	(United States) Minnesota Whitecaps
36	F	Zoe Hickel	1.67 m (5 ft 6 in)	69 kg (152 lb)	July 10, 1992 (aged 23)	(United States) Boston Pride
37	F	Amanda Pelkey	1.61 m (5 ft 3 in)	59 kg (130 lb)	May 29, 1993 (aged 22)	(United States) Boston Pride

== Group B ==
=== Czech Republic ===
Head coach: Jiří Vozák

No.	Pos.	Name	Height	Weight	Birthdate	Team
1	G	Blanka Škodová	1.76 m (5 ft 9 in)	67 kg (148 lb)	October 1, 1997 (aged 18)	(Czech Republic) HC Zubr Přerov
2	D	Aneta Tejralová – A	1.64 m (5 ft 5 in)	57 kg (126 lb)	January 4, 1996 (aged 20)	(Russia) HC St. Petersburg
4	D	Kateřina Flachsová	1.70 m (5 ft 7 in)	63 kg (139 lb)	September 29, 1986 (aged 29)	(Switzerland) SC Reinach
5	D	Samantha Kolowratová	1.70 m (5 ft 7 in)	68 kg (150 lb)	July 12, 1996 (aged 19)	(United States) Univ. of Vermont
6	D	Petra Herzigová	1.63 m (5 ft 4 in)	63 kg (139 lb)	January 29, 1986 (aged 30)	(Sweden) SDE HF
7	D	Martina Zedníková	1.70 m (5 ft 7 in)	65 kg (143 lb)	March 28, 1998 (aged 18)	(Czech Republic) Vajgar Hradec
8	F	Kateřina Bukolská	1.70 m (5 ft 7 in)	67 kg (148 lb)	March 6, 1997 (aged 19)	(Canada) Stanstead College
9	F	Alena Polenská – C	1.76 m (5 ft 9 in)	68 kg (150 lb)	June 9, 1990 (aged 25)	(Russia) HC St. Petersburg
10	F	Denisa Křížová	1.65 m (5 ft 5 in)	65 kg (143 lb)	November 3, 1994 (aged 21)	(United States) Univ. of Northeastern
11	F	Simona Studentová	1.58 m (5 ft 2 in)	50 kg (110 lb)	August 24, 1986 (aged 29)	(Switzerland) SC Reinach
12	F	Klára Hymlarová	1.61 m (5 ft 3 in)	57 kg (126 lb)	February 27, 1999 (aged 17)	(Czech Republic) HC Slezan Opava
13	F	Lucie Povová	1.68 m (5 ft 6 in)	68 kg (150 lb)	September 16, 1992 (aged 23)	(Czech Republic) HC Litoměřice
15	F	Aneta Lédlová	1.68 m (5 ft 6 in)	76 kg (168 lb)	December 31, 1996 (aged 19)	(Canada) Ontario Hockey Academy
17	D	Pavlína Horálková – A	1.66 m (5 ft 5 in)	61 kg (134 lb)	May 24, 1991 (aged 24)	(Russia) HK Krasnoyarsk
19	F	Barbora Patočková	1.73 m (5 ft 8 in)	59 kg (130 lb)	September 23, 1998 (aged 17)	(Czech Republic) HC Praha
21	F	Tereza Vanišová	1.69 m (5 ft 7 in)	65 kg (143 lb)	January 30, 1996 (aged 20)	(Canada) World Hockey Centre
22	F	Lucie Manhartová	1.73 m (5 ft 8 in)	72 kg (159 lb)	May 14, 1991 (aged 24)	(Sweden) SDE HF
25	F	Michaela Pejzlová	1.70 m (5 ft 7 in)	59 kg (130 lb)	June 4, 1997 (aged 18)	(Canada) Stanstead College
26	F	Vendula Přibylová	1.71 m (5 ft 7 in)	72 kg (159 lb)	March 23, 1996 (aged 20)	(Czech Republic) Hokej Šumperk
27	D	Anna Zíková	1.68 m (5 ft 6 in)	60 kg (130 lb)	May 13, 1998 (aged 17)	(Czech Republic) AZ Havířov
28	F	Noemi Neubauerova	1.72 m (5 ft 8 in)	70 kg (150 lb)	December 15, 1999 (aged 16)	(United States) The Gunnery
29	G	Klára Peslarová	1.63 m (5 ft 4 in)	63 kg (139 lb)	November 23, 1996 (aged 19)	(Sweden) SDE HF
30	G	Barbora Dvořáková	1.78 m (5 ft 10 in)	82 kg (181 lb)	November 15, 1995 (aged 20)	(Czech Republic) SK Karviná

=== Japan ===
The roster was announced on 18 February 2016.

Head coach: Yoshifumi Fujisawa

No.	Pos.	Name	Height	Weight	Birthdate	Team
1	G	Nana Fujimoto	1.63 m (5 ft 4 in)	54 kg (119 lb)	March 3, 1989 (aged 27)	(United States) New York Riveters
2	D	Shiori Koike	1.59 m (5 ft 3 in)	52 kg (115 lb)	March 21, 1993 (aged 23)	(Japan) Daito Perigrine
3	D	Rina Takeda	1.71 m (5 ft 7 in)	67 kg (148 lb)	January 16, 1993 (aged 23)	(Japan) Mikage Gretz
4	D	Ayaka Toko	1.61 m (5 ft 3 in)	58 kg (128 lb)	August 22, 1994 (aged 21)	(Japan) Seibu Rabbits
6	D	Sena Suzuki	1.67 m (5 ft 6 in)	58 kg (128 lb)	August 4, 1991 (aged 24)	(Canada) Toronto Furies
7	D	Mika Hori	1.63 m (5 ft 4 in)	53 kg (117 lb)	February 17, 1992 (aged 24)	(Japan) Toyota Cygnus
9	D	Aina Takeuchi	1.66 m (5 ft 5 in)	63 kg (139 lb)	August 16, 1991 (aged 24)	(Canada) Calgary Inferno
10	F	Haruna Yoneyama	1.60 m (5 ft 3 in)	54 kg (119 lb)	November 7, 1991 (aged 24)	(Japan) Daito Perigrine
11	F	Yurie Adachi	1.56 m (5 ft 1 in)	51 kg (112 lb)	April 26, 1985 (aged 30)	(Japan) Seibu Rabbits
12	F	Chiho Osawa – C	1.62 m (5 ft 4 in)	64 kg (141 lb)	February 10, 1992 (aged 24)	(Japan) Victory Honda
13	F	Moeko Fujimoto	1.55 m (5 ft 1 in)	53 kg (117 lb)	August 5, 1992 (aged 23)	(Canada) Calgary Titans
14	F	Haruka Toko	1.64 m (5 ft 5 in)	56 kg (123 lb)	March 16, 1997 (aged 19)	(Japan) Seibu Rabbits
15	F	Rui Ukita	1.68 m (5 ft 6 in)	71 kg (157 lb)	June 6, 1996 (aged 19)	(Canada) Ontario Hockey Academy
16	F	Naho Terashima	1.57 m (5 ft 2 in)	56 kg (123 lb)	May 2, 1993 (aged 22)	(Japan) Daishin HC
17	F	Yuka Hirano – A	1.57 m (5 ft 2 in)	52 kg (115 lb)	January 26, 1987 (aged 29)	(Japan) Daito Perigrine
18	F	Suzuka Taka	1.60 m (5 ft 3 in)	51 kg (112 lb)	October 16, 1996 (aged 19)	(Japan) Daito Perigrine
19	F	Miho Shishiuchi	1.64 m (5 ft 5 in)	62 kg (137 lb)	August 21, 1992 (aged 23)	(Finland) HPK
21	F	Hanae Kubo – A	1.68 m (5 ft 6 in)	63 kg (139 lb)	December 10, 1982 (aged 33)	(Japan) Seibu Rabbits
22	F	Tomomi Iwahara	1.61 m (5 ft 3 in)	61 kg (134 lb)	December 19, 1987 (aged 28)	(Japan) Seibu Rabbits
27	F	Shoko Ono	1.57 m (5 ft 2 in)	58 kg (128 lb)	September 5, 1981 (aged 34)	(Japan) Mikage Gretz
28	D	Aoi Shiga	1.64 m (5 ft 5 in)	54 kg (119 lb)	July 4, 1999 (aged 16)	(Japan) Obihiro Ladies
29	G	Mai Kondo	1.65 m (5 ft 5 in)	54 kg (119 lb)	April 4, 1992 (aged 23)	(Japan) Mikage Gretz
30	G	Akane Konishi	1.66 m (5 ft 5 in)	65 kg (143 lb)	August 14, 1995 (aged 20)	(Japan) Seibu Rabbits

=== Sweden ===
The roster was announced on 15 March 2016.

Head coach: Leif Boork

No.	Pos.	Name	Height	Weight	Birthdate	Team
1	G	Sara Grahn	1.70 m (5 ft 7 in)	71 kg (157 lb)	September 25, 1988 (aged 27)	(Sweden) Brynäs IF
3	D	Anna Kjellbin	1.69 m (5 ft 7 in)	62 kg (137 lb)	March 16, 1994 (aged 22)	(Sweden) Linköpings HC
4	F	Jenni Asserholt – C	1.72 m (5 ft 8 in)	79 kg (174 lb)	April 8, 1988 (aged 27)	(Sweden) HV71
5	D	Johanna Fällman	1.73 m (5 ft 8 in)	72 kg (159 lb)	June 21, 1990 (aged 25)	(Sweden) Luleå HF
7	D	Johanna Olofsson	1.69 m (5 ft 7 in)	68 kg (150 lb)	July 13, 1991 (aged 24)	(Sweden) Modo Hockey
8	D	Annie Svedin – A	1.63 m (5 ft 4 in)	70 kg (150 lb)	October 12, 1991 (aged 24)	(Sweden) IF Sundsvall
9	D	Caroline Markström	1.70 m (5 ft 7 in)	67 kg (148 lb)	May 29, 1994 (aged 21)	(United States) Univ. of St. Cloud
10	D	Emilia Ramboldt – A	1.75 m (5 ft 9 in)	72 kg (159 lb)	August 31, 1988 (aged 27)	(Sweden) Linköpings HC
12	D	Elin Lundberg	1.63 m (5 ft 4 in)	65 kg (143 lb)	May 15, 1993 (aged 22)	(Sweden) Leksands IF
13	F	Hanna Sköld	1.68 m (5 ft 6 in)	74 kg (163 lb)	November 7, 1992 (aged 23)	(Sweden) Leksands IF
14	F	Sabina Küller	1.76 m (5 ft 9 in)	74 kg (163 lb)	September 22, 1994 (aged 21)	(Sweden) AIK IF
16	F	Pernilla Winberg	1.65 m (5 ft 5 in)	67 kg (148 lb)	February 24, 1989 (aged 27)	(Sweden) Linköpings HC
18	F	Anna Borgqvist	1.63 m (5 ft 4 in)	65 kg (143 lb)	June 11, 1992 (aged 23)	(Sweden) Brynäs IF
19	F	Maria Lindh	1.76 m (5 ft 9 in)	63 kg (139 lb)	September 23, 1993 (aged 22)	(United States) Univ. of Minnesota Duluth
20	F	Fanny Rask	1.68 m (5 ft 6 in)	60 kg (130 lb)	May 21, 1991 (aged 24)	(Sweden) HV71
21	F	Erica Udén Johansson	1.71 m (5 ft 7 in)	69 kg (152 lb)	July 20, 1989 (aged 26)	(Sweden) IF Sundsvall
22	D	Emma Eliasson	1.67 m (5 ft 6 in)	75 kg (165 lb)	June 12, 1989 (aged 26)	(Sweden) Luleå HF
23	F	Lisa Johansson	1.61 m (5 ft 3 in)	60 kg (130 lb)	April 11, 1992 (aged 23)	(Sweden) AIK IF
26	F	Hanna Olsson	1.72 m (5 ft 8 in)	69 kg (152 lb)	January 20, 1999 (aged 17)	(Sweden) Djurgårdens IF
28	F	Michelle Löwenhielm	1.72 m (5 ft 8 in)	67 kg (148 lb)	March 22, 1995 (aged 21)	(United States) Univ. of Minnesota Duluth
29	F	Olivia Carlsson	1.74 m (5 ft 9 in)	70 kg (150 lb)	March 2, 1995 (aged 21)	(Sweden) Modo Hockey
30	G	Minatsu Murase	1.68 m (5 ft 6 in)	65 kg (143 lb)	June 23, 1995 (aged 20)	(Sweden) AIK IF
35	G	Sarah Berglind	1.63 m (5 ft 4 in)	63 kg (139 lb)	February 10, 1996 (aged 20)	(Sweden) Modo Hockey

=== Switzerland ===
The roster was announced on 2 March 2016.

Head coach: Daniela Diaz

No.	Pos.	Name	Height	Weight	Birthdate	Team
1	G	Sophie Anthamatten	1.70 m (5 ft 7 in)	68 kg (150 lb)	July 26, 1991 (aged 24)	(Switzerland) EHC Saastal
3	D	Sarah Forster – A	1.69 m (5 ft 7 in)	64 kg (141 lb)	March 19, 1993 (aged 23)	(Sweden) HC Université Neuchâtel
7	F	Lara Stalder	1.67 m (5 ft 6 in)	65 kg (143 lb)	May 15, 1994 (aged 21)	(United States) Univ. of Minnesota Duluth
10	D	Reica Staiger	1.63 m (5 ft 4 in)	63 kg (139 lb)	November 8, 1996 (aged 19)	(Switzerland) ZSC Lions
11	D	Sabrina Zollinger	1.65 m (5 ft 5 in)	65 kg (143 lb)	March 27, 1993 (aged 23)	(Switzerland) ZSC Lions
12	F	Andrea Schranz	1.59 m (5 ft 3 in)	64 kg (141 lb)	April 18, 1988 (aged 27)	(Switzerland) EV Bomo Thun
13	F	Tess Allemann	1.65 m (5 ft 5 in)	60 kg (130 lb)	April 7, 1998 (aged 17)	(Switzerland) HC Dragon
14	F	Romy Eggimann	1.58 m (5 ft 2 in)	57 kg (126 lb)	September 29, 1995 (aged 20)	(Switzerland) HC Lugano
15	F	Monika Waidacher	1.72 m (5 ft 8 in)	70 kg (150 lb)	July 9, 1990 (aged 25)	(Switzerland) ZSC Lions
16	F	Nina Waidacher	1.70 m (5 ft 7 in)	65 kg (143 lb)	August 23, 1992 (aged 23)	(Switzerland) ZSC Lions
18	F	Evelina Raselli	1.69 m (5 ft 7 in)	63 kg (139 lb)	May 3, 1992 (aged 23)	(Switzerland) HC Lugano
19	F	Christine Meier	1.70 m (5 ft 7 in)	68 kg (150 lb)	May 24, 1986 (aged 29)	(Switzerland) ZSC Lions
21	D	Laura Benz	1.72 m (5 ft 8 in)	63 kg (139 lb)	August 25, 1992 (aged 23)	(Switzerland) ZSC Lions
22	D	Livia Altmann – C	1.65 m (5 ft 5 in)	65 kg (143 lb)	December 13, 1994 (aged 21)	(Switzerland) ZSC Lions
23	D	Nicole Bullo	1.60 m (5 ft 3 in)	54 kg (119 lb)	July 18, 1987 (aged 28)	(Switzerland) HC Lugano
24	D	Shannon Sigrist	1.69 m (5 ft 7 in)	62 kg (137 lb)	April 20, 1999 (aged 16)	(Switzerland) GCK Lions
25	F	Alina Müller	1.65 m (5 ft 5 in)	54 kg (119 lb)	March 12, 1998 (aged 18)	(Switzerland) Kloten Flyers
26	F	Dominique Rüegg	1.72 m (5 ft 8 in)	70 kg (150 lb)	February 5, 1996 (aged 20)	(Switzerland) EHC Uzwil
30	G	Andrea Brändli	1.69 m (5 ft 7 in)	70 kg (150 lb)	June 5, 1997 (aged 18)	(Switzerland) EHC Winterthur
41	G	Florence Schelling	1.75 m (5 ft 9 in)	65 kg (143 lb)	March 9, 1989 (aged 27)	(Sweden) Linköpings HC
63	F	Anja Stiefel – A	1.60 m (5 ft 3 in)	62 kg (137 lb)	August 9, 1990 (aged 25)	(Switzerland) HC Lugano
78	F	Isabel Waidacher	1.64 m (5 ft 5 in)	55 kg (121 lb)	July 25, 1994 (aged 21)	(Switzerland) ZSC Lions
88	F	Phoebe Staenz	1.63 m (5 ft 4 in)	62 kg (137 lb)	January 7, 1994 (aged 22)	(United States) Yale Univ.
