= Vafina =

Vafina is a surname. Notable people with the surname include:

- Alexandra Vafina (born 1990), Russian ice hockey player
- Lyubov Vafina (born 1967), Kazakh ice hockey player
