= Darya Gredzen =

Russian ice hockey player (born 2004)

- Born: 23 March 2004 (age 22) Novosibirsk, Russia
- Height: 5 ft 9 in (175 cm)
- Weight: 148 lb (67 kg; 10 st 8 lb)
- Position: Goaltender
- Catches: Right
- ZhHL team: Biryusa Krasnoyarsk
- National team: Russia
- Playing career: 2019–present

Darya Aleksandrovna Gredzen (Russian: Дарья Александровна Гредзен; born 23 March 2004) is a Russian professional ice hockey goaltender for Biryusa Krasnoyarsk of the Zhenskaya Hockey League (ZhHL).

== Playing career ==
Grezden joined Biryusa Krasnoyarsk of the ZhHL in 2019. During the 2023–24 season, she posted a 20–10–4 record during the regular season and helped Krasnoyarsk advance to the WHL Cup final for the first time in program history, finishing in second place. Following the season she was named Russia's Best Player. During the 2024–25 season, she posted a 26–12–2 record during the regular season, along with a 1.89 goals against average (GAA) and 93.9 save percentage. Following the season she was named the ZhHL Goaltender of the Year.

On 17 June 2026, Gredzen was drafted in the fourth round, 57th overall, by the Minnesota Frost in the 2026 PWHL Draft.

== International play ==
Grezden represented Russia at the 2022 Winter Olympics. On 5 February 2022, she made her Olympic debut in a game against the United States. At 17 years old, she became the youngest Russian goaltender to compete at the Olympics, surpassing the previous record held by Vladislav Tretiak.
