= Tatyana Shatalova =

Russian ice hockey player (born 1999)

Tatyana Shatalova Татьяна Шаталова
- Born: 17 August 1999 (age 25); Minsk, Belarus
- Height: 166 cm (5 ft 5 in)
- Position: Forward
- Shoots: Left
- ZhHL team Former teams: Belye Medveditsy; Metropolitan Riveters; Biryusa Krasnoyarsk
- Playing career: 2014–present

Tatyana Shatalova (Russian: Татьяна Шаталова; born 17 August 1999) is a Belarusian-born Russian ice hockey forward, currently playing with the Belye Medveditsy of the Zhenskaya Hockey League (ZhHL). She holds the record for youngest player to play in the Premier Hockey Federation (PHF; previously known as NWHL, 2015–2021).

== Playing career ==
Shatalova began playing ice hockey at the age of 6. Her parents had initially opposed her decision to start playing, but reversed their opinion after she told them she would start boxing instead. Until she turned 11, she played on the Yunost Minsk youth boys' teams and had to fill out paperwork every year to be allowed to play with boys.

At the age of 16, she contacted HC Tornado via their website and was offered a try-out. The team directed her to a different team in the Zhenskaya Hockey League, Biryusa Krasnoyarsk, with whom she would play for four seasons. She scored 7 points in 19 games during her rookie season. Across the following three years in the ZhHL, she scored an additional 29 points in 90 games.

In 2019, at the age of 19, she left Russia to move to North America and sign a contract with the Metropolitan Riveters of the National Women's Hockey League (NWHL; PHF since 2021), becoming the fourth player from Russia and the first Belarusian-born player to join the league. She put up 12 points in 23 games in her rookie season and was noted for her fast, aggressive and physical style of play, getting 29 penalty minutes and a one-game suspension for fighting. During the season, she worked on overcoming the language barrier with fellow Russian-speaking Riveters rookie Bulbul Kartanbay of Kazakhstan. She scored her first NWHL goal on 28 December 2019, the game-winning goal of the first outdoor NWHL game, the Buffalo Believes Classic, against the Buffalo Beauts. She had previously scored a shootout goal earlier in December, the game winner in a match against the Minnesota Whitecaps.

She re-signed with the Riveters for the 2020–21 NWHL season, but ultimately had to opt-out of the COVID-19 bubble.

== International career ==
Shatalova represented Russia in both the 2016 and 2017 IIHF U18 Women's World Championship, earning a bronze medal in 2017. In 2018, she was named to the senior Russian women's roster for the 2018 Winter Olympics as a reserve player, but didn't appear in any games.

== Personal life ==
Shatalova wears #17 after Soviet ice hockey star Valeri Kharlamov.

When asked about the possibility of introducing body checking to women's hockey, she stated, "I think that just like in men’s hockey that women’s hockey has emotions, too. Sometimes you want to use your hands and your body. On the ice, we don’t have to be ‘feminine’ – this is hockey."

She played for Russia at the 2018 World Ball Hockey Federation Women's World Championship in Moscow and Dmitrov, winning gold.

== Career statistics ==
			Regular season					Playoffs
Season	Team	League	GP	G	A	Pts	PIM	GP	G	A	Pts	PIM
2015-16	Biryusa Krasnoyarsk	ZhHL	19	5	2	7	12	-	-	-	-	-
2016-17	Biryusa Krasnoyarsk	ZhHL	38	5	8	13	10	-	-	-	-	-
2017-18	Biryusa Krasnoyarsk	ZhHL	23	4	7	11	57	-	-	-	-	-
2018-19	Biryusa Krasnoyarsk	ZhHL	32	4	1	5	26	2	0	0	0	2
2019-20	Metropolitan Riveters	NWHL	22	2	10	12	29	1	0	0	0	0
2020-21	Metropolitan Riveters	NWHL	-	-	-	-	-	-	-	-	-	-
NWHL totals			23	2	10	12	29	1	0	0	0	0
