= Yelena Tyushnyakova =

Russian speed skater

Personal information
- Native name: Еле́на Тюшняко́ва
- Born: Yelena Nikolayevna Goncharova; 4 January 1963 (age 63) Chelyabinsk, Russian SFSR, Soviet Union

Sport
- Country: Unified Team
- Sport: Speed skating
- Club: PR Chelyabinsk

Achievements and titles
- Personal bests: 500 m: 40.66 (1992); 1000 m: 1:22.16 (1991); 1500 m: 2:06.26 (1988); 3000 m: 4:33.29 (1983); 5000 m: 8:00.18 (1984)

Yelena Nikolayevna Tyushnyakova née Goncharova (Russian: Еле́на Никола́евна Тюшняко́ва (в девичестве — Гончаро́ва); born 4 January 1963) is a Soviet-born Russian retired speed skater and ice hockey player. She competed in two speed skating events at the 1992 Winter Olympics as a member of the Unified Team.

Tyushkanova also played ice hockey as a defenceman at the Russian national level. She served as the inaugural captain of the Russian Women's Hockey League (RWHL) team Metelitsa Chelyabinsk during the 1997–98 season. As of the 2021–22 season, she serves as the conditioning coach of the Belye Medveditsy Chelyabinsk (previously Metelitsa Chelyabinsk) in the Zhenskaya Hockey League (ZhHL; replaced RWHL in 2015).
