= Petr Novák =

Petr Novák may refer to:

- Petr Novák (musician) (1945–1997), Czech rock musician
- Petr Novák (athlete) (born 1975), Czech Paralympic athlete
- Petr Novák (skier) (born 1982), Czech skier
- Petr Novák (ice hockey) (born 1967), Czech ice hockey coach

== See also ==
- Petar Novák, Czech footballer
