= Sofiya Lifatova =

Russian ice hockey player

Sofiya Lifatova София Лифатова
- Born: 27 March 2003 (age 22); Angarsk, Irkutsk Oblast, Russia
- Height: 167 cm (5 ft 6 in)
- Weight: 56 kg (123 lb; 8 st 11 lb)
- Position: Forward
- Shoots: Left
- ZhHL team: Biryusa Krasnoyarsk
- National team: Russia
- Playing career: 2018–present

Sofiya Sergeyevna Lifatova (Russian: София Сергеевна Лифатова, also romanized Sofia Sergeevna Lifatova; born 27 March 2003) is a Russian ice hockey player and member of the Russian national ice hockey team, currently playing in the Zhenskaya Hockey League (ZhHL) with Biryusa Krasnoyarsk.

Lifatova represented the Russian Olympic Committee at the 2021 IIHF Women's World Championship. As a junior player with the Russian national under-18 team, she participated in the 2019 IIHF Women's U18 World Championship and won a bronze medal at the 2020 IIHF Women's U18 World Championship.

Lifatova made her senior club debut with Biryusa Krasnoyarsk in the 2018–19 ZhHL season and has played the entirety of her career with the club. Lifatova was selected to the 2022 ZhHL All-Star Game.
