= HC Khimik Moscow Oblast =

HC Khimik Moscow Oblast may refer to:

- Atlant Moscow Oblast, for 1998–2008
- Khimik Voskresensk (2005–), for 2011–current
