= Lidia Malyavko =

Belarusian-Russian ice hockey player

Lidia Malyavko Лідзія Маляўка
- Born: 23 January 1995 (age 31) Kolbasino, Grodno, Belarus
- Height: 167 cm (5 ft 6 in)
- Weight: 62 kg (137 lb; 9 st 11 lb)
- Position: Forward
- Shoots: Left
- ZhHL team Former teams: Tornado Dmitrov; SKSO Yekaterinburg; SKIF Nizhny Novgorod; Biryusa Krasnoyarsk; Kometa Odintsovo; HK Pantera Minsk
- National team: Russia
- Playing career: 2010–present
Medal record
Representing Russia
Universiade
Silver medal – second place	2017 Astana-Almaty	Ice hockey

Lidia Alexandrovna Malyavko (Russian: Лидия Александровна Малявко, romanized: Lidiya Aleksandrovna Malyavko) or Lidziya Aliaxandravna Maliavka (Belarusian: Лідзія Аляксандраўна Маляўка, romanized: Lidzija Aliaksandraŭna Maliaŭka; born 23 January 1995) is a Belarusian-Russian ice hockey player, currently playing in the Zhenskaya Hockey League (ZhHL) with Tornado Dmitrov. She represented Russia at the 2017 IIHF Women's World Championship and won a silver medal with the national team in the women's ice hockey tournament at the 2017 Winter Universiade.

Malyavko has previously played with HK Pantera Minsk in the Elite Women's Hockey League (EWHL) and Latvian Championship in women's ice hockey, and in the ZhHL with SKSO Yekaterinburg, SKIF Nizhny Novgorod, Biryusa Krasnoyarsk, and Kometa Odintsovo.
