= Yekaterina Dobrodeyeva =

Russian ice hockey player (born 1999)

Yekaterina Dobrodeyeva Екатерина Добродеева
- Born: 10 December 1999 (age 26) Pereyaslavka, Russia
- Height: 158 cm (5 ft 2 in)
- Weight: 59 kg (130 lb; 9 st 4 lb)
- Position: Forward
- Shoots: Left
- ZhHL team: Biryusa Krasnoyarsk
- National team: Russia
- Playing career: 2015–present
Medal record
Universiade
Gold medal – first place	2019 Krasnoyarsk	Ice hockey

Yekaterina Ruslanovna Dobrodeyeva (Russian: Екатерина Руслановна Добродеева, also romanized Ekaterina Dobrodeeva; born 10 December 1999) is a Russian ice hockey player and member of the Russian national ice hockey team, currently serving as an alternate captain of Biryusa Krasnoyarsk in the Zhenskaya Hockey League (ZhHL).

Dobrodeyeva represented the Russian Olympic Committee at the 2021 IIHF Women's World Championship. She won a gold medal with the Russian team in the women's ice hockey tournament at the 2019 Winter Universiade. As a junior player with the Russian national under-18 team, she participated in the IIHF Women's U18 World Championship tournaments in 2015, 2016, and 2017, winning bronze medals in 2015 and 2017.

Dobrodeyeva made her senior club debut with Biryusa Krasnoyarsk in the 2015–16 ZhHL season and has played the entirety of her career with the club. She was selected to the ZhHL All-Star Games in 2018, 2020, and 2022.
