= Yekaterina Lobova =

Russian ice hockey player

Yekaterina Lobova Екатерина Лобова
- Born: October 25, 1998 (age 27) Novosibirsk, Russia
- Height: 167 cm (5 ft 6 in)
- Weight: 67 kg (148 lb; 10 st 8 lb)
- Position: Defence
- Shoots: Right
- ZhHL team: Biryusa Krasnoyarsk
- National team: Russia
- Playing career: 2015–present
Medal record
Women's ice hockey
Representing Russia
Universiade
Gold medal – first place	2017 Astana-Almaty	Ice hockey

Yekaterina Aleksandrovna Lobova (Russian: Екатерина Александровна Лобова; born October 25, 1998) is a Russian ice hockey player. She most recently played with Biryusa Krasnoyarsk of the Zhenskaya Hockey League (ZhHL) in the 2020–21 season.

Lobova represented Russia at the 2017 IIHF Women's World Championship and 2017 Winter Universiade, and participated in the women’s ice hockey tournament at the 2018 Winter Olympics with the Olympic Athletes from Russia team.
