= Valeria Pavlova =

Russian ice hockey player (born 1995)

Valeria Pavlova Валерия Павлова
- Born: 15 April 1995 (age 31) Tyumen, Russia
- Height: 1.78 m (5 ft 10 in)
- Weight: 80 kg (176 lb; 12 st 8 lb)
- Position: Forward
- Shoots: Left
- ZhHL team Former teams: Biryusa Krasnoyarsk; Tyumenskie Lisitsy
- National team: Russia
- Playing career: 2011–present
Medal record
World Championship
Bronze medal – third place	2013 Canada
Bronze medal – third place	2016 Canada
Universiade
Gold medal – first place	2015 Granada	Ice hockey
Gold medal – first place	2019 Krasnoyarsk	Ice hockey

Valeria Viktorovna Pavlova (Russian: Валерия Викторовна Павлова; born 15 April 1995) is a Russian ice hockey player, a member of the Russian national team and the captain of Biryusa Krasnoyarsk in the Zhenskaya Hockey League (ZhHL).

She has been a member of the Russian national team since 2011 and has represented Russia at six IIHF Women's World Championships, in 2012, 2013, 2015, 2016, 2019, and 2021 and in the women's ice hockey tournament at the 2018 Winter Olympics, and won gold medals in the women's ice hockey tournaments at the Winter Universiades in 2015 and 2019.
