= Belye Medveditsy =

ZhHL ice hockey team in Chelyabinsk, Russia

Belye Medveditsy Chelyabinsk Белые Медведицы Челябинск
- City: Chelyabinsk, Russia
- League: Zhenskaya Hockey League
- Founded: 1997
- Operated: 1997–2015; 2021–present
- Home arena: Yunost Sport Palace
- Colours: Black, white
- Owner: Traktor Chelyabinsk
- Head coach: Igor Znarok
- Website: hctraktor.org/belye-medvedicy

Franchise history
- 1997–1998: Metelitsa Chelyabinsk
- 1998–2000: Nika Chelyabinsk
- 2000–2002: Kazak Uralsky Chelyabinsk
- 2002–2014: Fakel Chelyabinsk
- 2014–2015: Belye Medveditsy Chelyabinsk
- 2021–: Belye Medveditsy Chelyabinsk

Belye Medveditsy Chelyabinsk (Russian: Бе́лые Медве́дицы Челябинск, lit. 'Polar Bears Chelyabinsk') are an ice hockey team in the Zhenskaya Hockey League (ZhHL). They play in Chelyabinsk, Russia at the Yunost Sport Palace. The team has previously been known as Metelitsa Chelyabinsk, Nika Chelyabinsk, Kazak-Uralsky Chelyabinsk, and Fakel Chelyabinsk.

The team is a part of the Traktor Chelyabinsk hockey organization, which also operates Traktor Chelyabinsk of the Kontinental Hockey League (KHL), Chelmet Chelyabinsk of the VHL, Belye Medvedi Chelyabinsk of the MHL, and a number of youth and junior teams.

== History ==
Founded in Chelyabinsk in 1997 as Metelitsa (Russian: Метелица, lit. 'Blizzard'), the club made its debut in the second round of the 1997–98 Russian Women's Hockey League (RWHL) season. Yelena Tyushnyakova, an ice hockey defenceman better known as an Olympic speed skater, was the first captain of Metelitsa. The team struggled in their inaugural season, recording a -165 goal differential and finishing at the bottom of the league.

Prior to the 1998–99 season, the team was renamed as Nika (Russian: Ника). In 2000, the name was changed to Kazak-Uralsky (Russian: Казак-Уральский, lit. 'Cossack-Urals'). During 2002 to 2014, the team was called Fakel (Russian: Факел, lit. 'Torch').

On 5 March 2014, the team joined the HC Tractor organization and their name was changed to Belye Medveditsy. On 8 March 2015, the team was dissolved for financial reasons.

== Season-by-season results ==
This is a partial list of the last five seasons completed by Belye Medveditsy, known as Fakel Chelyabinsk during 2002 to 2014.

Note: Finish = Rank at end of regular season; GP = Games played, W = Wins (3 points), OTW = Overtime wins (2 points), OTL = Overtime losses (1 point), L = Losses, GF = Goals for, GA = Goals against, Pts = Points, Top scorer: Points (Goals+Assists)

Season	League	Regular season									
Season	League	Finish	GP	W	OTW	OTL	L	GF	GA	Pts	Top scorer
2010–11	RWHL	3rd place, bronze medalist(s)	30	16	2	0	12	116	82	52	(Russia) A. Vafina 50 (25+25)
2011–12	RWHL	4th	30	11	1	1	17	74	149	36	(Russia) O. Afonina 31 (14+17)
2012–13	RWHL	4th	48	26	1	1	20	156	139	81	(Russia) O. Afonina 50 (27+23)
2013–14	RWHL	5th	40	20	0	0	20	168	114	60	(Hungary) A. Huszak 72 (41+31)
2014–15	RWHL	8th	32	9	1	0	22	106	133	29	(Hungary) F. Gasparics 46 (28+18)

== Players and personnel ==
=== 2021–22 roster ===
As of 22 October 2021

No.	Nat	Player	Pos	S/G	Age	Acquired	Birthplace
72	(Russia)	Polina Andreyeva	G	L	21	2021	Apatity, Murmansk Oblast, Russia
41	(Russia)	Yulia Artyomova	G	L	27	2021	Sarov, Nizhny Novgorod Oblast, Russia
89	(Russia)	Varvara Boriskova	F	L	24	2021	Odintsovo, Moscow Oblast, Russia
30	(Russia)	Sofiya Boichenko	G	L	20	2021	Chelyabinsk, Chelyabinsk Oblast, Russia
47	(Russia)	Viktoria Fyodorova	F	L	21	2021	Kamensk-Uralsky, Sverdlovsk Oblast, Russia
15	(Russia)	Valeria Gorbunova	D	L	25	2021	Kramatorsk, Donetsk Oblast, Ukraine
21	(Russia)	Viktoria Kiselyova	F	L	21	2021	
11	(Russia)	Yana Krasheninina	F	R	22	2021	Chelyabinsk, Chelyabinsk Oblast, Russia
77	(Russia)	Alisa Kudelina	D	L	23	2021	Chelyabinsk, Chelyabinsk Oblast, Russia
18	(Russia)	Kamilla Mukhametdinova	F	L	23	2021	
35	(Russia)	Milana Nachyotova	D	L	21	2021	
33	(Russia)	Alina Narudinova	F	L	24	2021	Chelyabinsk, Chelyabinsk Oblast, Russia
22	(Russia)	Alina Orlova	D	L	26	2021	Stupino, Moscow Oblast, Russia
19	(Russia)	Yekaterina Osminova	D	L	22	2021	Korkino, Chelyabinsk Oblast, Russia
74	(Russia)	Yekaterina Prozorova	D	R	31	2021	
68	(Russia)	Maria Pushkar	F	L	25	2021	Kazan, Tatarstan, Russia
42	(Russia)	Anastasia Shabalina	F	L	22	2021	Chelyabinsk, Chelyabinsk Oblast, Russia
17	(Russia)	Tatyana Shatalova	F	L	26	2021	Minsk, Belarus
28	(Russia)	Kristina Smirnova	D	L	22	2021	Chelyabinsk, Chelyabinsk Oblast, Russia
27	(Russia)	Ilmira Taipova	F	L	27	2021	Kamsky Lespromkhoz, Mamadyshsky District, Tatarstan, Russia
1	(Russia)	Milena Tretyak	G	L	26	2021	Moscow, Russia
37	(Russia)	Berta Valeyeva	F	L	21	2021	Nizhnekamsk, Tatarstan, Russia
23	(Russia)	Zlata Vavilova	F	R	20	2021	Satka, Chelyabinsk Oblast, Russia
7	(Russia)	Natalya Vorontsova	D	L	31	2021	Nizhny Novgorod, Nizhny Novgorod Oblast, Russia
5	(Russia)	Valeria Zaika	F	L	20	2021	Chelyabinsk, Chelyabinsk Oblast, Russia
94	(Russia)	Yekaterina Zakharova	F	L	31	2021	Ufa, Bashkortostan, Russia
99	(Russia)	Tamara Zhordochkina	D	L	19	2021	Chelyabinsk, Chelyabinsk Oblast, Russia

Coaching staff and team personnel

- Head coach: Igor Znarok
- Assistant coach: Pyotr Pankov
- Assistant coach: Pavel Shiryayev
- Conditioning coach: Yelena Tyushnyakova

=== Team captaincy history ===
- Yelena Tyushnyakova, 1997–98
- Viktoria Tavakova, 1998–2004
- Yekaterina Vainberger, 2004–05
- Alexandra Vafina, 2008–2011
- Anastasia Vedernikova, 2011–2013
- Alexandra Vafina, 2013–14
- Anastasia Vedernikova, 2014–15

=== Head coaches ===
- Alexander Degtyaryov, 1997–98
- Vladimir Borodulin, 1998–2005
- Arkadi Belousov, 2008–2015
- Igor Znarok, 2021–

== Team honours ==
=== Russian Championship ===
- (bronze) Third Place (1): 2010–11

== All-time scoring leaders ==
The top-ten point-scorers in club history.

Note: Nat = Nationality; Pos = Position; GP = Games played; G = Goals; A = Assists; Pts = Points; P/G = Points per game; = 2021–22 Belye Medveditsy player

Scoring leaders
Nat	Player	Pos	GP	G	A	Pts	P/G
(Russia)	Yekaterina Lebedeva	F	138	62	82	144	1.043
(Russia)	Alexandra Vafina	F	78	76	63	139	1.782
(Russia)	Oxana Afonina	F	146	68	70	138	0.945
(Hungary)	Alexandra Huszak	F	72	65	45	110	1.528
(Hungary)	Fanni Gasparics	F	72	56	54	110	1.528
(Russia)	Yekaterina Anisimova	F	123	48	47	95	0.772
(Russia)	Anastasia Vedernikova	F	121	39	55	94	0.777
(Russia)	Yelena Timofeyeva	D	173	23	70	93	0.538
(Russia)	Yekaterina Skorodumova	F	190	41	48	89	0.468
(Kazakhstan)	Lyubov Vafina	F	202	37	45	82	0.406

== Notable alumni ==
Years active with Belye Medveditsy listed alongside player name.

- Yekaterina Lebedeva, 2010–2014
- Yekaterina Ananina, 2011–2014
- Yelena Tyushnyakova, 1997–98
- Alexandra Vafina, 2008–2011 & 2013–14

=== International players ===
- (Hungary) Fanni Gasparics, 2013–2015
- (Hungary) Alexandra Huszak, 2013–2015
- (Hungary) Franciska Kiss-Simon, 2013–2015
- (Kazakhstan) Varvara Piskunova, 2008–2014
- (United States) O'Hara Shipe, 2012–13
- (Kazakhstan) Lyubov Vafina, 2008–2015
