= Khimik Ice Palace =

Ice hockey arena in Voskresensk, Moscow Oblast

Nikolay Epshtein Khimik Ice Palace
- Ледовый дворец спорта «Химик» им. Н. С. Эпштейна
- LDS Khimik (ЛДС «Химик»)
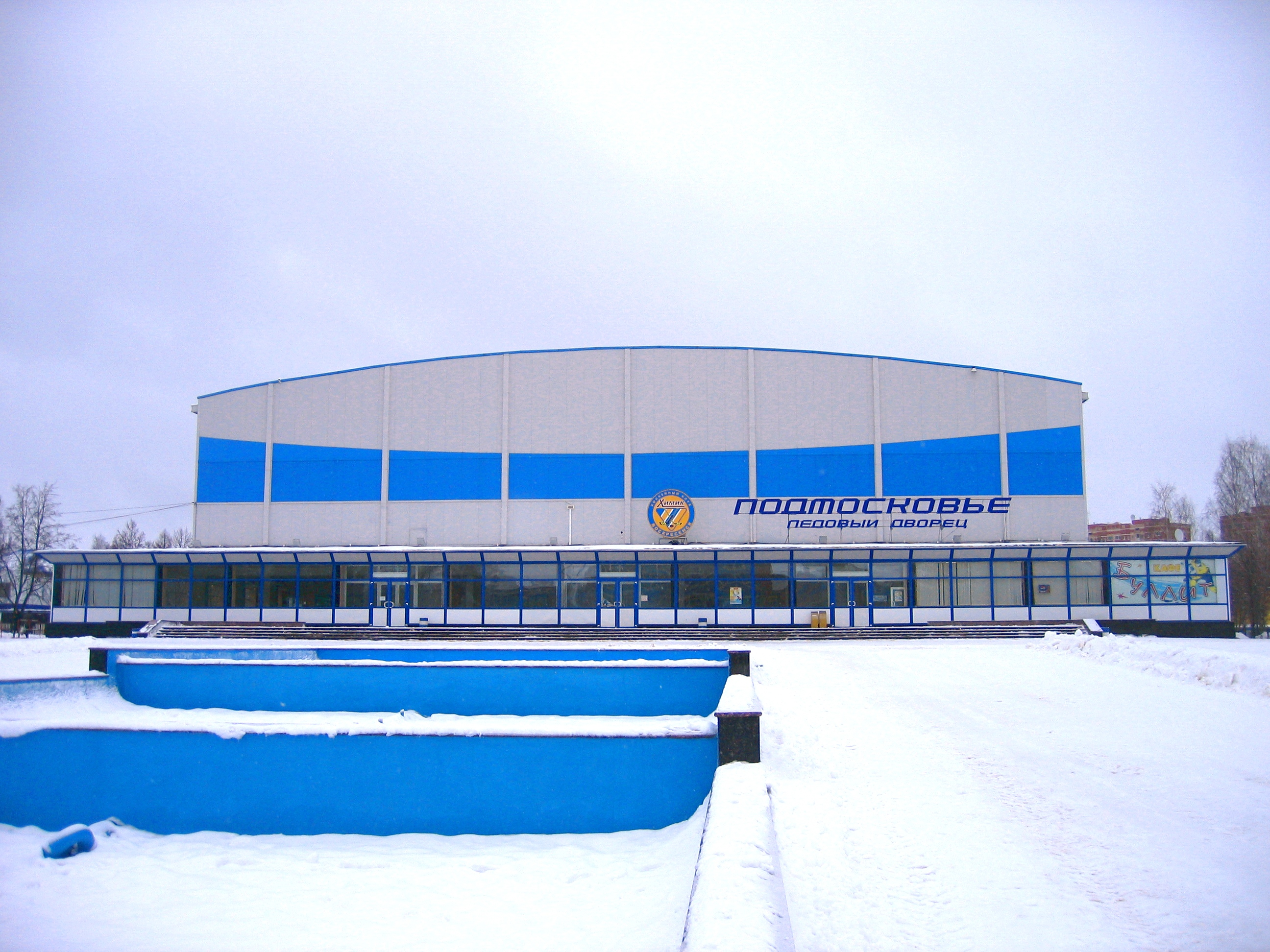
- Podmoskovie Ice Palace in 2009
- Interactive map of Nikolay Epshtein Khimik Ice Palace
- Address: Ulitsa Mendeleyeva, 2 Voskresensk, Moscow Oblast; Russia
- Coordinates: 55.323633°N 38.667829°E
- Capacity: 4,500

Construction
- Opened: 22 September 1966
- Architect: Yuri Andreyevich Regentov

Tenants
- Khimik Voskresensk; 7.62 Voskresensk

Nikolay Epshtein Khimik Ice Palace (Russian: Ледовый дворец спорта «Химик» имени Н. С. Эпштейна, romanized: Ledovyy dvorets sporta "Khimik" imeni N. S. Epshteyna), former Podmoskovye Ice Palace (Russian: Ледовый дворец «Подмосковье») – an indoor arena in Voskresensk, Moscow Oblast. It is the home arena of Khimik Voskresensk of the VHL and 7.62 of the Zhenskaya Hockey League (ZhHL).
