= Tereza Sadilová =

Czech ice hockey manager (born 1998)

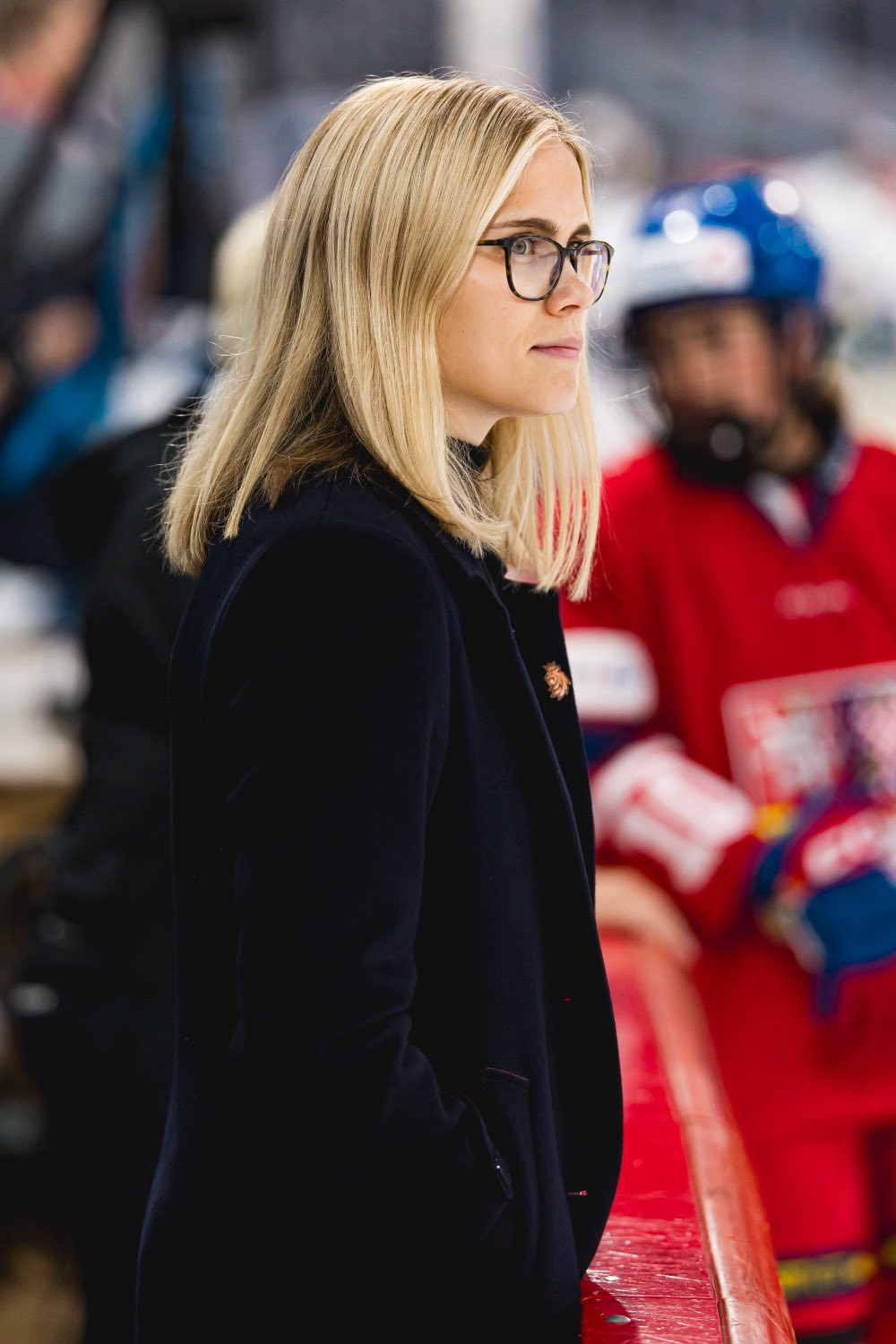
- Sadilová in 2025
- Born: 27 March 1998 (age 27) Prague, Czech Republic
- National team: Czech Republic

Tereza Sadilová (Czech pronunciation: [ˈtɛrɛza ˈsaɟɪlovaː]; born 27 March 1998) is a Czech ice hockey manager and former player, since 2022 the GM of the Czech Republic women's national ice hockey team. Her tenure saw the first medals from World Championships for Czech women's ice hockey (bronze from 2022 and 2023).
