= MSMO 7.62 =

ZhHL ice hockey club in Voskresensk, Moscow Oblast

- City: Voskresensk, Moscow Oblast, Russia
- League: Zhenskaya Hockey League
- Founded: 2020
- Home arena: Podmoskovie Ice Palace
- Colours: Purple, yellow
- General manager: Sergei Konovalov
- Head coach: Alexander Syrtsov
- Captain: Alina Ichayeva
- Website: Official website

МSМО 7.62 (Russian: МСМО 7.62) also known as WHC 7.62, or MSMO 7.62 Voskresensk (Russian: ЖХК 7.62, romanized: ZhHK 7.62; from Женский хоккейный клуб, 'Women's Hockey Club'), are an ice hockey team in the Zhenskaya Hockey League (ZhHL). They play in Voskresensk, Moscow Oblast at the Podmoskovie Ice Palace, with a capacity of 4500.

== History ==
The team was quickly formed to fill the vacancy left in the league when Dynamo St. Petersburg folded in July 2020. The team name represents the diameter of a hockey puck. The first player the team signed with previous professional experience was 18-year old Valeria Dryndina, who had previously played with HC Tornado, with the entirety of their roster for the 2020–21 ZhHL season being composed of players 18 years of age and under; the average age of the roster was approximately 16.2 years.

The team's first ZhHL match was a 3–0 loss to SKSO Yekaterinburg on 5 October 2020. The club picked up their first victory the next day, beating SKSO 2–1.

== Players and personnel ==
=== 2021–22 roster ===
As of 30 March 2022

No.	Nat	Player	Pos	S/G	Age	Acquired	Birthplace
60	(Russia)	Anna Alpatova	G	L	23	2021	Dmitrov, Moscow Oblast, Russia
62	(Russia)	Sofiya Andrianova	F	R	19	2021	
25	(Russia)	Polina Belozyorova	D	D	19	2021	
13	(Russia)	Sofiya Boriskina	F	L	20	2020	Samara, Samara Oblast, Russia
32	(Russia)	Viktoria Butorina	F	L	23	2020	Tyumen, Tyumen Oblast, Russia
2	(Russia)	Valeria Dryndina	F	L	23	2020	Yegoryevsk, Moscow Oblast, Russia
78	(Russia)	Kristina Glukharyova (A)	F	L	22	2020	Saint Petersburg, Russia
28	(Russia)	Mariya Goryacheva	F	L	22	2020	Stupino, Moscow Oblast, Russia
30	(Russia)	Alexandra Gritskova	G	L	20	2021	
17	(Russia)	Alina Ichayeva (C)	F	L	21	2020	Syktyvkar, Komi Republic, Russia
77	(Russia)	Polina Kirichenko	F	R	22	2020	Khabarovsk, Khabarovsk Krai, Russia
18	(Russia)	Irina Kulagina	D	L	25	2021	Voskresensk, Moscow Oblast, Russia
92	(Russia)	Darya Kuznetsova	D	L	21	2020	Moscow, Russia
76	(Russia)	Alina Landyreva	F	L	21	2020	Yaroslavl, Yaroslavl Oblast, Russia
97	(Russia)	Sofya Larova	G	L	21	2020	Yaroslavl, Yaroslavl Oblast, Russia
16	(Russia)	Darya Medyutova	F	L	21	2020	Saint Petersburg, Russia
87	(Russia)	Vlada Nazarenko	F	L	23	2020	Nevinnomyssk, Stavropol Krai, Russia
10	(Russia)	Anastasia Nesterova	F	L	20	2020	Blagoveshchensk, Amur Oblast, Russia
11	(Russia)	Alexandra Novikova	D	R	20	2021	
50	(Russia)	Yulia Nuyaksheva	D	L	20	2020	Dmitrov, Moscow Oblast, Russia
23	(Russia)	Anastasia Petina (A)	D	L	23	2020	Gelendzhik, Krasnodar Krai, Russia
24	(Russia)	Olga Roslyakova	D	L	20	2021	
69	(Russia)	Alina Rudenko	D	R	19	2021	
89	(Russia)	Mariya Shirshova	F	R	20	2020	Odintsovo, Moscow Oblast, Russia
14	(Russia)	Yekaterina Tishchenko	F	R	20	2020	Odintsovo, Moscow Oblast, Russia
33	(Russia)	Yelizaveta Velichko	F	L	21	2020	Odintsovo, Moscow Oblast, Russia
27	(Russia)	Olga Volodina	F	L	21	2020	Chkalovsk, Nizhny Novgorod Oblast, Russia

Coaching staff and team personnel

- Head coach: Alexander Syrtsov
- Assistant coach: Alexander Karpov
- Team manager: Roman Sasin

=== Team captaincy history ===
- Darya Kovalenko, 2020–2021
- Alina Ichayeva, 2021–

=== Head coaches ===
- Alexander Syrtsov, 2020–
