= Khimik Voskresensk (2005) =

Russian ice hockey team

- Nickname: "Chemists"
- City: Voskresensk, Moscow Oblast
- League: VHL 2015–present: MHL 2010–2015; Vysshaya Liga 2005–2008, 2009–2010; KHL 2008–2009
- Founded: 1953 (2005)
- Home arena: Khimik Ice Palace (capacity: 4,500)
- Colours
- General manager: Roman Belyayev
- Head coach: Yegor Bashkatov
- Affiliates: Spartak Moscow (KHL); JHC Spartak (MHL)
- Website: voshimik.ru

Franchise history
- HC Khimik Voskresensk

Khimik Voskrenensk (Russian: Химик Воскресенск, lit. 'Voskresensk Chemists'), also known as Moscow Hockey Club Khimik, is an ice hockey team based in Voskresensk, Moscow Oblast, Russia. The team plays its home games in the 4,500 seat Khimik Ice Palace, which was previously known as the Podmoskovye Ice Palace. It is currently playing in the VHL, the second level of ice hockey in Russia.

== History ==
This team is not to be confused with the original Khimik Voskresensk team which relocated and was replaced by in 2005. Because it was an expansion team, it was relegated to the Russian Supreme League prior to its success in the 2007–08 season and subsequent promotion to the KHL. It would last there for a year.

In July 2009, the team went bankrupt. However, later it was reported that the team would play in the Russian Major League in the 2009–10 season. The team was not accepted into the 2010–11 season of the Russian Major League and the league's management suggested that the team take a 1-year timeout. The team management decided to participate in the MHL in the 2010–11 season under the name MHC Khimik. In June 2015, the team was accepted into the VHL for the 2015–16 season.

== Honors ==
=== Runners-up ===
- (silver) Soviet League Championship (1): 1989
- (silver) Russian Superleague (1): 2007
- (bronze) Soviet League Championship (4): 1965, 1970, 1984, 1990
