= Czechia women's national ice hockey team =

Czech Republic
- Nickname: Lvice ('Lionesses')
- Association: Czech Ice Hockey Association
- General manager: Tereza Sadilová
- Head coach: Brian Idalski
- Assistants: Karolína Erbanová; Ivo Mocek
- Captain: Aneta Tejralová
- Most games: Alena Polenská (166)
- Top scorer: Alena Polenská; Tereza Vanišová (52)
- Most points: Kateřina Mrázová (112)
- IIHF code: CZE
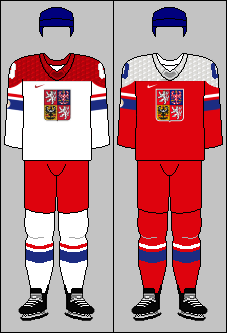

Ranking
- Current IIHF: 3 ▲1 (3 June 2026)
- Highest IIHF: 3 (2024)
- Lowest IIHF: 14 (2011)

First international
- Czech Republic 6–0 Italy (Belluno, Italy; 27 February 1993)

Biggest win
- Czech Republic 16–0 Poland (Chomutov, Czech Republic; 13 November 2021)

Biggest defeat
- Germany 11–0 Czech Republic (Plzeň, Czech Republic; 5 November 1995)

Olympics
- Appearances: 2 (first in 2022)

World Championships
- Appearances: 22 (first in 2013)
- Best result: Bronze: (2022, 2023)

International record (W–L–T)
- 207–180–17

Medal record

World Championship
Bronze medal – third place	2022 Denmark	
Bronze medal – third place	2023 Canada	

The Czech women's national ice hockey team is the national women's ice hockey team of the Czech Republic. Since 2021, the team has been officially known in English as Czechia. The women's national team is controlled by Czech Ice Hockey Association. As of 2021, Czech Republic has 4,142 female players.

== Tournament record ==
=== Olympic Games ===
- 2022 – Finished 7th
- 2026 – Finished 5th

=== World Championship ===
- 1999 – Finished 4th in Group B
- 2000 – Finished 7th in Group B
- 2001 – Finished 3rd in Division I
- 2004 – Finished 2nd in Division I
- 2005 – Finished 3rd in Division I
- 2007 – Finished 5th in Division I
- 2008 – Finished 3rd in Division I
- 2009 – Finished 5th in Division I (Demoted to Division II)
- 2011 – Finished 1st in Division II (Promoted to Division I)
- 2012 – Finished 1st in Division IA (Promoted to Top Division)
- 2013 – Finished 8th (Demoted to Division IA)
- 2014 – Finished 9th (Promoted to playoff)
- 2015 – Finished 9th (Promoted to Top Division)
- 2016 – Finished 6th
- 2017 – Finished 8th
- 2019 – Finished 6th
- 2020 – Cancelled due to the coronavirus pandemic
- 2021 – Finished 7th
- 2022 – Bronze
- 2023 – Bronze
- 2024 – Finished 4th
- 2025 – Finished 4th
- 2026 – Finished 7th

=== European Championship ===
- 1993 – Finished in 8th place (2nd in Group B)
- 1995 – Finished in 9th place (2nd in Group B)
- 1996 – Finished in 9th place (2nd in Group B)

== Team ==
=== Current roster ===
Roster for the 2026 IIHF Women's World Championship.

Head coach: Brian Idalski

No.	Pos.	Name	Height	Weight	Birthdate	Team
2	D	Aneta Tejralová – C	1.64 m (5 ft 5 in)	53 kg (117 lb)	4 January 1996 (age 30)	(United States) Seattle Torrent
3	F	Adéla Šapovalivová	1.61 m (5 ft 3 in)	58 kg (128 lb)	17 May 2006 (age 20)	(United States) Wisconsin Badgers
4	D	Daniela Pejšová	1.75 m (5 ft 9 in)	70 kg (150 lb)	14 August 2002 (age 24)	(United States) San Jose Sea Lions
6	F	Linda Vocetková	1.74 m (5 ft 9 in)	70 kg (150 lb)	22 March 2007 (age 19)	(United States) Colgate Raiders
7	D	Klára Seroiszková	1.75 m (5 ft 9 in)	73 kg (161 lb)	25 January 2001 (age 25)	(Switzerland) HC Davos
8	F	Tereza Pištěková	1.71 m (5 ft 7 in)	60 kg (130 lb)	3 June 2005 (age 21)	(Sweden) SDE HF
9	F	Tereza Gildainová	1.64 m (5 ft 5 in)	63 kg (139 lb)	31 January 2008 (age 18)	(United States) Lovell Academy Lions
11	D	Aneta Paroubková	1.60 m (5 ft 3 in)	65 kg (143 lb)	10 January 2008 (age 18)	(Canada) Stoney Creek Sabres
12	F	Klára Hymlárová	1.63 m (5 ft 4 in)	67 kg (148 lb)	27 February 1999 (age 27)	(United States) Minnesota Frost
16	F	Kateřina Mrázová	1.63 m (5 ft 4 in)	61 kg (134 lb)	19 October 1992 (age 34)	(Canada) Ottawa Charge
18	F	Michaela Pejzlová	1.69 m (5 ft 7 in)	62 kg (137 lb)	4 June 1997 (age 29)	(Sweden) Frölunda HC
19	F	Natálie Mlýnková	1.61 m (5 ft 3 in)	67 kg (148 lb)	24 May 2001 (age 25)	(United States) San Jose Sea Lions
20	F	Barbora Juříčková	1.68 m (5 ft 6 in)	60 kg (130 lb)	21 October 2006 (age 20)	(United States) St. Lawrence Saints
22	F	Tereza Plosová	1.77 m (5 ft 10 in)	64 kg (141 lb)	5 July 2006 (age 20)	(United States) Minnesota Golden Golphers
24	D	Sára Čajanová	1.70 m (5 ft 7 in)	63 kg (139 lb)	10 December 2002 (age 23)	(Sweden) Brynäs IF
26	F	Vendula Přibylová – A	1.71 m (5 ft 7 in)	78 kg (172 lb)	23 March 1996 (age 30)	(Sweden) Linköping HC
27	D	Tereza Radová	1.76 m (5 ft 9 in)	74 kg (163 lb)	22 November 2001 (age 24)	(Hungary) HK Budapest
28	D	Noemi Neubauerová – A	1.73 m (5 ft 8 in)	68 kg (150 lb)	15 December 1999 (age 26)	(United States) Seattle Torrent
29	G	Klára Peslarová	1.65 m (5 ft 5 in)	64 kg (141 lb)	23 November 1996 (age 29)	(Sweden) Brynäs IF
30	G	Daniela Nováková	1.75 m (5 ft 9 in)	70 kg (150 lb)	18 March 2007 (age 19)	(United States) St. Thomas Tommies
42	D	Ellen Jarabková	1.75 m (5 ft 9 in)	78 kg (172 lb)	21 January 2009 (age 17)	(Sweden) MoDo Hockey
44	F	Barbora Bartáková	1.68 m (5 ft 6 in)	62 kg (137 lb)	24 January 2004 (age 22)	(Sweden) Djurgårdens IF
45	G	Aneta Šenková	1.68 m (5 ft 6 in)	73 kg (161 lb)	24 June 2006 (age 20)	(United States) Clarkson Golden Knights
86	F	Anežka Čabelová	1.63 m (5 ft 4 in)	60 kg (130 lb)	21 August 2006 (age 20)	(United States) Boston University Terriers
98	F	Kristýna Kaltounková	1.74 m (5 ft 9 in)	75 kg (165 lb)	14 April 2002 (age 24)	(United States) New York Sirens

=== Head coaches ===
- Milan Koks, 1999–2000
- Jan Fidrmuc, 2001–2009
- Karel Manhart, 2009–2013
- Jiří Vozák, 2013–2017
- Petr Novák, 2018–2020
- Tomáš Pacina, 2020–2021
- Carla MacLeod, 2022–2026
- Brian Idalski, 2026–
