= Petr Novák (ice hockey) =

Czech ice hockey coach (born 1967)

Petr Novák (born 7 October 1967 in Havlíčkův Brod) is a Czech ice hockey coach, who coached the Czech national team at the 2019 IIHF Women's World Championship.
