= Lyubov Vafina =

Kazakh ice hockey player (born 1967)

Lyubov Vafina Любовь Вафина
- Born: 25 November 1967 (age 58) Alma-Ata, Kazakh SSR, Soviet Union
- Height: 156 cm (5 ft 1 in)
- Weight: 50 kg (110 lb; 7 st 12 lb)
- Position: Forward
- Shot: Left
- Played for: Team Kazakhstan; Fakel Chelyabinsk
- National team: Kazakhstan
- Playing career: 1996–2015

Lyubov Vafina (Russian: Любовь Вафина; born 25 November 1967) is a Kazakh retired ice hockey player. She represented Kazakhstan in the women's ice hockey tournament at the 2002 Winter Olympics. Her daughter is Russian national team player Alexandra Vafina.
