= Ronja Jenike =

German ice hockey player

- Born: 28 December 1989 (age 35); Hamburg, West Germany
- Height: 5 ft 7 in (170 cm)
- Weight: 154 lb (70 kg; 11 st 0 lb)
- Position: Defence
- Shoots: Left
- DFEL team Former teams: ESC Planegg; Hamburger SV
- National team: Germany
- Playing career: 2007–present

Ronja Jenike (born 28 December 1989) is a German ice hockey player for ESC Planegg and the German national team.

She participated at the 2017 IIHF Women's World Championship.
