= Anna Zíková =

Czech ice hockey player

- Born: 13 May 1998 (age 27) Český Těšín, Czech Republic
- Height: 1.68 m (5 ft 6 in)
- Weight: 60 kg (132 lb; 9 st 6 lb)
- Position: Defense
- Shoots: Left
- EŽH team Former teams: HC Falcons Karviná: HPK Hämeenlinna; Göteborg HC; Maine Black Bears; SK Karviná; AZ Havířov
- National team: Czech Republic
- Playing career: 2014–present

Anna Zíková (born 13 May 1998) is a Czech ice hockey player. Her college ice hockey career was played with the Maine Black Bears women's ice hockey program in the Hockey East (HEA) conference of the NCAA Division I during 2017 to 2021. She began the 2022–23 season with Göteborg HC, however the club withdrew from the Swedish Women's Hockey League (SDHL) in early November 2022 and she played for the rest of the season in the Finnish Naisten Liiga (NSML) with HPK Kiekkonaiset.

As a member of the Czech national team, she participated in the Top Division tournaments of the IIHF Women's World Championship in 2016, 2017, and 2019, and in the Division I Group A tournament in 2015.
