= Biryusa Krasnoyarsk =

ZhHL ice hockey team in Krasnoyarsk

Biryusa Krasnoyarsk Бирюса Красноярск
- City: Krasnoyarsk, Russia
- League: Zhenskaya Hockey League
- Founded: 1987
- Home arena: Platinum Arena Krasnoyarsk
- Colours: Navy, blue, red
- Owner: Sokol Krasnoyarsk
- General manager: Andrei Nikishov
- Head coach: Alexander Vedernikov
- Captain: Valeria Pavlova
- Website: krsksokol.ru

Franchise history
- 1987–2008: Lokomotiv Krasnoyarsk
- 2008–2012: Lokomotiv-Energiya Krasnoyarsk
- 2012–: Biryusa Krasnoyarsk

Biryusa Krasnoyarsk (Russian: Бирюса Красноярск, lit. 'Turquoise Krasnoyarsk') are a Russian ice hockey team in the Zhenskaya Hockey League (ZhHL). They play in Krasnoyarsk, the capital of Krasnoyarsk Krai in Siberia, at the Platinum Arena Krasnoyarsk and use Fakel Ice Palace as a secondary arena. The team was founded in 1987 as Lokomotiv Krasnoyarsk and was called Lokomotiv-Energiya Krasnoyarsk from 2008 to 2012.

Since 2012, Biryusa have been a part of the Hockey Club Sokol, which also operates Sokol Krasnoyarsk of the Supreme Hockey League (VHL) and the Krasnoyarskie Rysi of the Supreme Hockey League Championship (VHL-B).

== History ==
=== Lokomotiv ===
In 1987, the Lokomotiv women's team was established as a bandy team. The founders of the team were the Krasnoyarsk Railway Administration and the Road Territorial Organization of the Trade Union of the Krasnoyarsk Railway (DORPROFSOZh; Russian: Дорпрофсож). Valery Pozdnyakov became the head coach of the team. Beginning in 1987, the team participated in the Bandy Championship of the Soviet Union (USSR), the Commonwealth of Independent States (CIS), and Russia. In 1991, they were silver medalists of the USSR Championship and in 1992 they won the USSR Champion title. Lokomotiv's players were consistently selected to the national bandy team of the Soviet Union and, following the dissolution of the Soviet Union, the national bandy team of Russia.

In 1994, the International Olympic Committee (IOC) selected to include women's ice hockey in the Winter Olympic program beginning at the 1998 Winter Olympics. The team was reoriented towards ice hockey at the initiative of the Krasnoyarsk Regional Committee on Physical Culture and Sports, and were a founding team of the Russian Women’s Hockey League in 1995.

=== Lokomotiv-Energiya ===
In 2008, after being accepted into its ranks as an affiliate club of HC Energiya in Neryungri, the name of the club changed to Lokomotiv-Energiya. During the 2010–11 season, due to the emergency renovation of the Sokol Ice Palace, the team had to hold their home games and training sessions at the Fakel Sports Complex, which is located 30 kilometres (19 mi) from Krasnoyarsk in the village of Podgorny. On 1 June 2011, Lokomotiv-Energiya joined the Sokol hockey club organization. In March 2012, the team relocated to the new Pervomaisky Ice Arena in the Leninsky district of Krasnoyarsk.

=== Biryusa ===
In August 2012, after the contracts with Russian Railways and HC Energiya Neryungri expired, it was decided to rename the team. After a survey of fans and the team administration, the women's team of Krasnoyarsk was renamed "Biryusa," after the river Biryusa. At the end of 2012 the team returned to the rebuilt Sokol Ice Palace for training and home games.

In the 2015–16 season, Biryusa was a founding team of the Zhenskaya Hockey League (ZhHL), joining SKIF Nizhny Novgorod as the only teams to have participated in the inaugural season of both the Russian Women’s Hockey League and the ZhHL.

== Season-by-season results ==
This list includes all Zhenskaya Hockey League seasons completed by Biryusa since the league was established in 2015.
Note: Finish = Rank at end of regular season; GP = Games played, W = Wins (3 points), OTW = Overtime wins (2 points), OTL = Overtime losses (1 point), L = Losses, GF = Goals for, GA = Goals against, Pts = Points, Top scorer: Points (Goals+Assists)

| Season | League | Regular season | | | | | | | | | | Postseason results |
| Season | League | Finish | GP | W | OTW | OTL | L | GF | GA | Pts | Top scorer | Postseason results |
|---|---|---|---|---|---|---|---|---|---|---|---|---|
| 2015–16 | ZhHL | 3rd place, bronze medalist(s) | 24 | 14 | 2 | 2 | 6 | 92 | 57 | 48 | (Russia) V. Pavlova 43 (26+17) | – |
| 2016–17 | ZhHL | 4 | 36 | 13 | 4 | 2 | 17 | 98 | 92 | 49 | (Russia) L. Malyavko 37 (18+19) | – |
| 2017–18 | ZhHL | 5 | 24 | 12 | 1 | 0 | 11 | 82 | 58 | 38 | (Russia) V. Pavlova 33 (22+11) | Did not qualify |
| 2018–19 | ZhHL | 3 | 36 | 18 | 3 | 2 | 13 | 110 | 80 | 62 | (Russia) V. Pavlova 50 (33+17) | (bronze) Won bronze medal |
| 2019–20 | ZhHL | 4 | 28 | 12 | 2 | 2 | 12 | 82 | 69 | 42 | (Russia) V. Pavlova 39 (24+15) | (bronze) Won bronze medal |
| 2020–21 | ZhHL | 4 | 28 | 13 | 2 | 4 | 9 | 81 | 79 | 47 | (Russia) V. Pavlova 39 (16+23) | Lost semifinal, 0–2 (KRS Vanke Rays) |

== Players and personnel ==
=== 2021–22 roster ===
As of 4 October 2021

| No. | Nat | Player | Pos | S/G | Age | Acquired | Birthplace |
|---|---|---|---|---|---|---|---|
| 12 | (Russia) | Sofya Bakayeva | D | L | 22 | 2021 | |
| 94 | (Russia) | Alexandra Budanova | D | L | 25 | 2017 | Stupino, Moscow Oblast, Russia |
| 11 | (Russia) | Yekaterina Danilova | D | L | 27 | 2020 | Prokudskoye, Novosibirsk Oblast, Russia |
| 26 | (Russia) | Yekaterina Dobrodeyeva | F | L | 26 | 2015 | Pereyaslavka, Khabarovsk Krai, Russia |
| 69 | (Russia) | Polina Doyanova | F | R | 23 | 2019 | Korkino, Chelyabinsk Oblast, Russia |
| 29 | (Russia) | Darya Gredzen | G | R | 21 | 2019 | Novosibirsk, Novosibirsk Oblast, Russia |
| 20 | (Czech Republic) | Pavlína Horálková | D | R | 34 | 2014 | Benešov, Středočeský kraj, Czechoslovakia |
| 15 | (Russia) | Karina Kondratova | D | L | 21 | 2021 | |
| 17 | (Russia) | Yelena Larshina | D | L | 25 | 2019 | Moscow, Russia |
| 77 | (Russia) | Yevgenia Larshina | F | L | 21 | 2020 | Moscow, Russia |
| 83 | (Russia) | Yekaterina Lazurenko | G | L | 23 | 2020 | Krasnoyarsk, Krasnoyarsk Krai, Russia |
| 19 | (Russia) | Sofiya Lifatova | F | L | 22 | 2018 | Angarsk, Irkutsk Oblast, Russia |
| 14 | (Russia) | Yelena Mezentseva | F | L | 24 | 2016 | Chita, Zabaykalsky Krai, Russia |
| 68 | (Russia) | Oxana Mitrofanova | F | R | 25 | 2020 | Voskresensk, Moscow Oblast, Russia |
| 82 | (Russia) | Ulyana Nemilostyevaya | G | L | 21 | 2021 | Prokopyevsk, Kemerovo Oblast, Russia |
| 89 | (Russia) | Valeria Pavlova (C) | F | L | 30 | 2014 | Tyumen, Tyumen Oblast, Russia |
| 13 | (Russia) | Ksenia Rakcheyeva | F | L | 22 | 2019 | Korkino, Chelyabinsk Oblast, Russia |
| 87 | (Russia) | Valeria Samoilova | F | L | 20 | 2021 | Tyumen, Tyumen Oblast, Russia |
| 88 | (Russia) | Sofya Sychyova | D | L | 24 | 2016 | Khabarovsk, Khabarovsk Krai, Russia |
| 78 | (Russia) | Karina Verkhovtseva | F | L | 28 | 2020 | Kazan, Tatarstan, Russia |
| 72 | (Russia) | Yelizaveta Zenchenko | F | L | 27 | 2018 | Odintsovo, Moscow Oblast, Russia |
| 97 | (Russia) | Irina Zhigulina | D | L | 23 | 2019 | Vyselki, Krasnodar Krai, Russia |

Coaching staff and team personnel

- Head coach: Alexander Vedernikov
- Assistant coach: Valery Tripuzov
- Goaltending coach: Ilya Protsenko
- Team manager: Nikolai Matsuev
- Team doctor: Liliya Sergeyeva

=== Team captaincy history ===
- Oksana Tretyakova, –2017
- Valeria Pavlova, 2017–present

=== Head coaches ===
- Valery Pozdnyakov, 1987–
- Alexander Lubyagin, –2004
- Alexander Vedernikov, 2015–present

== Awards and honours ==
=== Russian Ice Hockey Championship ===
- (bronze) Third Place (10): 1995–96, 1996–97, 1998–99, 1999–2000, 2000–01, 2002–03, 2008–09, 2015–16, 2018–19, 2019–20

=== Other ===
- (gold) International Ice Hockey Tournament at Cergy-Pontoise (1): 1998
- (silver) USSR Bandy Championship Runner-up (1): 1990–91
- USSR Bandy Cup Champion (1): 1990–91

=== Player awards ===
- ZhHL Forward of the Year (Top goal scorer)
  - 2019–20: Valeria Pavlova

==== ZhHL All-Stars ====
- 2018 Astana: Yekaterina Dobrodeyeva (F), Yekaterina Lobova (D), Lydia Malyavko (F), Nadezhda Morozova (G)
- 2019 Nizhnekamsk: Pavlína Horálková (D), Nadezhda Morozova (G), Anna Timofeyeva (F), Valeria Pavlova (F)
- 2020 Moscow: Yekaterina Dobrodeyeva (F), Pavlína Horálková (D), Valeria Pavlova (F)

ZhHL Player of the Month

- Forward of the Month
  - September 2021: Valeria Pavlova

== Franchise records ==
Note: In order to present accurate statistics, only records from the Zhenskaya Hockey League are included for single-season and career records., from the inaugural ZhHL season in 2015–16 through the 2020–21 ZhHL season,

=== Single-season records ===
Regular season

- Most goals in a season: Valeria Pavlova, 33 goals (35 games; 2018–19)
- Most assists in a season: Valeria Pavlova, 23 assists (27 games; 2019–20)
- Most points in a season: Valeria Pavlova, 50 points (35 games; 2018–19)
- Most points in a season, defenceman: Yekaterina Lobova, 21 goals (games; 2016–17)
- Most penalty minutes in a season: Tatyana Shatalova, 47 PIM (23 games; 2017–18)
- Best save percentage in a season, over ten games played: Darya Gredzen, .922 SVS% (21 games; 2020–21)
- Best goals against average in a season, over ten games played: Nadezhda Morozova, 2.26 GAA (35 games; 2018–19)

Source: Elite Prospects

=== Career records ===
Regular season

- Most career goals: Valeria Pavlova, 121 goals (138 games; 2015–2021)
- Most career assists: Valeria Pavlova, 83 assists (138 games; 2015–2021)
- Most career points: Valeria Pavlova, 00 points (138 games; 2015–2021)
- Best career points per game, over 30 games played: Valeria Pavlova, 1.478 points per game (138 games; 2015–2021)
- Most career points, defenceman: Pavlína Horálková, 65 points (165 games; 2015–2021)
- Most career penalty minutes: Tatyana Shatalova, 105 PIM (109 games; 2015–2019)
- Most career games played, goaltender: Nadezhda Morozova, 135 games (2015–2020)

Source: Elite Prospects

=== All-time scoring leaders ===
The top-ten point-scorers in franchise history, from the 1995–96 RWHL season through the 2020–21 ZhHL season.

Note: Nat = Nationality; Pos = Position; GP = Games played; G = Goals; A = Assists; Pts = Points; P/G = Points per game; = 2021–22 Biryusa player; Italics indicate totals compiled from incomplete statistics

Points
| Nat | Player | Pos | GP | G | A | Pts | P/G |
|---|---|---|---|---|---|---|---|
| (Russia) | Oksana Tretyakova | F | 194 | 146 | 101 | 247 | 1.273 |
| (Russia) | Valeria Pavlova | F | 138 | 121 | 83 | 204 | 1.478 |
| (Russia) | Tatyana Burina | F | 59 | 79 | 69 | 148 | 2.508 |
| (Russia) | Yekaterina Dobrodeyeva | F | 175 | 62 | 71 | 133 | 0.760 |
| (Russia) | Irina Korotkova | F | 89 | 48 | 51 | 99 | 1.112 |
| (Russia) | Natalya Orekhova | F | 83 | 53 | 38 | 91 | 1.096 |
| (Ukraine) | Natalya Stus | F | 89 | 46 | 33 | 79 | 0.888 |
| (Russia) | Lidiya Malyavko | F | 89 | 41 | 37 | 78 | 0.876 |
| (Russia) | Yelena Mezentseva | F | 150 | 33 | 41 | 74 | 0.493 |
| (Russia) | Kristina Sherstyuk | F | 103 | 42 | 31 | 73 | 0.709 |

== Notable alumni ==
Years active with Biryusa listed alongside player name.

- Tatiana Burina, 1996–c. 2000
- Yekaterina Lobova, 2015–2019 & 2020–21
- Tatyana Shatalova, 2015–2019
- Kristina Sherstyuk, c. 2010–2015
- Anna Timofeyeva, 2018–2021
- Oksana Tretyakova, 1996–c. 2000
- Olga Volkova (née Savenkova), 1996–c. 2000

=== International players ===
- (Belarus) (Russia) Lidiya Malyavko, 2015–2019
- (Czech Republic) Lucie Manhartová, 2014–15
- (Czech Republic) Klára Peslarová, 2014–15
- (Belarus) Mariya Skvortsova, 2003–04
- (Ukraine) Natalya Stus, c. 1996–c. 2012
- (Kazakhstan) Natalya Trunova, 1996–97
