= Jiří Vozák =

Czech ice hockey player and coach

- Born: October 31, 1962 (age 62)
- Position: Forward
- Shot: Left
- Played for: HC Litvínov; HC Topoľčany; Piráti Chomutov; HC Bílí Tygři Liberec
- Playing career: 1982–1989

Jiří Vozák (born October 31, 1962) is a Czech retired ice hockey player and coach.

He coached the Czech women's national team at the 2016 IIHF Women's World Championship.
