= Alexandra Vafina =

Russian ice hockey player (born 1990)

Alexandra Vafina Александра Вафина
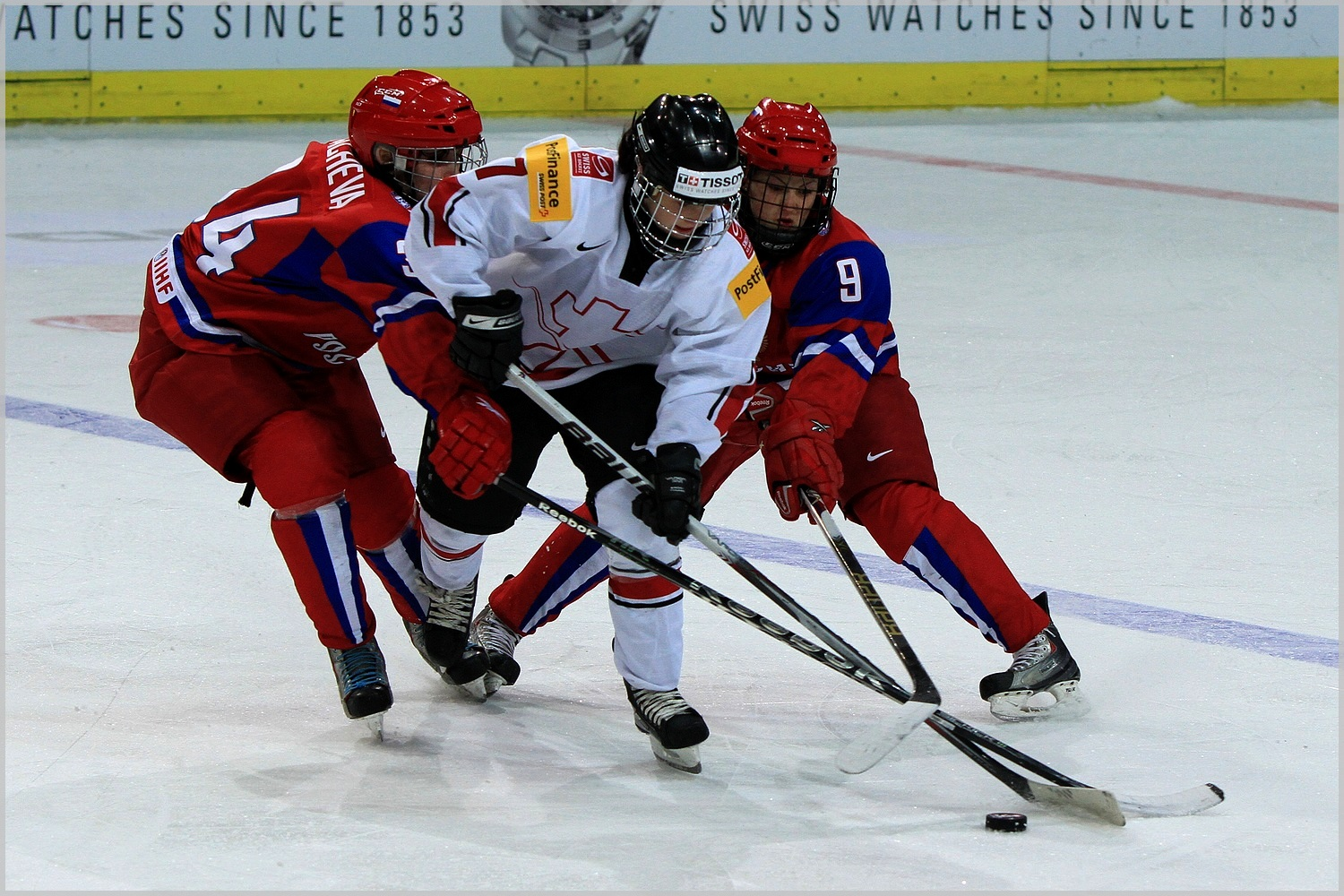
- Vafina (r) and teammate Svetlana Tkacheva (l) challenge Swiss forward Darcia Leimgruber (c) at the 2011 World Championship.
- Born: 28 July 1990 (age 36) Almaty, Kazakh ASSR, Soviet Union
- Height: 1.64 m (5 ft 5 in)
- Weight: 57 kg (126 lb; 9 st 0 lb)
- Position: Forward
- Shoots: Left
- ZhHL team Former teams: Dinamo-Neva St. Petersburg: KRS Vanke Rays; SK Gorny; SKIF Nizhny Novgorod; Agidel Ufa; Calgary Dinos; Minnesota Duluth Bulldogs; Fakel Chelyabinsk
- National team: Russia
- Playing career: 2008–present
Medal record
World Championship
| Bronze medal – third place | 2013 Canada |
| Bronze medal – third place | 2016 Canada |
Winter Universiade
| Gold medal – first place | 2015 Granada | Ice hockey |
| Gold medal – first place | 2017 Astana-Almaty | Ice hockey |

Alexandra Aleksandrovna "Sasha" Vafina (Russian: Александра Александровна Вафина, also romanized Aleksandra Aleksandrovna Vafina; born 28 July 1990) is a Russian ice hockey forward and member of the Russian national ice hockey team, currently playing in the Zhenskaya Hockey League (ZhHL) with Dinamo-Neva Saint Petersburg.

== International career ==
Vafina was selected for the Russia national women's ice hockey team in the 2010 Winter Olympics. She played in all five games, scoring one goal and two points.

Vafina has also represented Russia at ten IIHF Women's World Championships. Her first appearance came in 2008. She was a member of the team that won a bronze medal at the 2013 IIHF Women's World Championship.

At the 2015 Winter Universiade in Granada, Spain, Vafina was part of Russia's gold medal winning team, handing Canada its first-ever loss in FISU women's ice hockey.

She also competed in one IIHF Women's U18 World Championship with the Russia women's national under-18 ice hockey team, the inaugural event in 2008.

== Career statistics ==
=== International career ===
| Year | Team | Event | GP | G | A | Pts | PIM |
|---|---|---|---|---|---|---|---|
| 2008 | Russia U18 | U18 | 5 | 0 | 1 | 1 | 4 |
| 2008 | Russia | WW | 4 | 0 | 0 | 0 | 2 |
| 2009 | Russia | WW | 4 | 0 | 1 | 1 | 2 |
| 2010 | Russia | Oly | 5 | 1 | 0 | 1 | 2 |
| 2011 | Russia | WW | 6 | 2 | 1 | 3 | 4 |
| 2012 | Russia | WW | 5 | 0 | 0 | 0 | 2 |
| 2013 | Russia | WW | 6 | 3 | 1 | 4 | 4 |

== Awards and honors ==
- 2015-16 U Sports First Team All-Canadian
