= HC Dinamo Saint Petersburg =

Ice hockey club based in Saint Petersburg, Russia

HC Dynamo Saint Petersburg
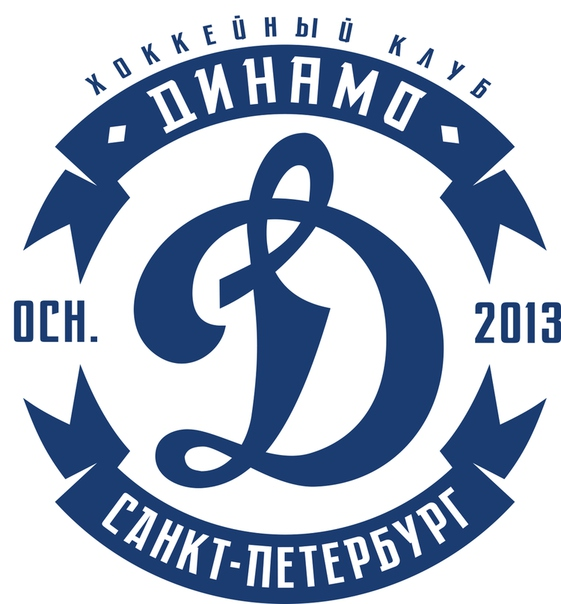
- City: Saint Petersburg, Russia
- League: VHL
- Founded: 1946/1965/2013
- Folded: 1954/1971
- Home arena: Jubilee (capacity: 7,000)
- Colours
- Head coach: Igor Grishin
- Affiliates: Dynamo Moscow (KHL); JHC Dynamo (MHL); JHC Dinamo-Karelia Kondopoga (MHL); JHC Dinamo-Junior St. Petersburg (NMHL); JHC Dinamo-576 St. Petersburg (NMHL); WHC Dinamo‑Neva (ZhHL)
- Website: Dinamo-SPb.com

Hockey Club Dynamo Saint Petersburg (Russian: Хоккейный клуб "Динамо" Санкт-Петербург) is a Russian professional ice hockey club based in Saint Petersburg, Russia. They are members of the All-Russian Hockey League (VHL). Dinamo have a farm teams in the Junior Hockey League (MHL) and National Junior Hockey League (NMHL). The club also has a women’s team in the Women’s Hockey League (ZhHL), called Dinamo‑Neva Saint Petersburg.

Their main sponsor is the Wingas company.

== History ==
The club was established in 1946, but never reached over the 5th position in the Soviet Championship League.

During the Soviet era, Dynamo belonged to the Ministry of Internal Affairs sports club system (Dynamo Sports Club) and consisted of Leningrad police officers.

In 1971, the club was dissolved and reestablished in 2013 as a junior hockey club.

== Honors ==
- Petrov Cup
  - Winners (1): 2018

== See also ==
- FC Dynamo Saint Petersburg
- BC Dynamo Saint Petersburg
