= Zhenskaya Hockey League =

Professional ice hockey league in Russia

Zhenskaya Hockey League Женская хоккейная лига
- Most recent season or competition: 2025–26 ZhHL season
- Formerly: Russian Women's Hockey League, 1995–2015
- Sport: Ice hockey
- Founded: 19 June 2015
- Founder: KHL & FHR
- Director: Alexei Morozov
- Motto: Красивая Лига (The Beautiful League)
- No. of teams: 7
- Country: Russia
- Most recent champion: Agidel Ufa (2025–26)
- Most titles: Agidel Ufa (6 titles)
- Domestic cup: Dmitry Solunsky Cup
- Website: whl.fhr.ru

The Zhenskaya Hockey League (Russian: Женская хоккейная лига, romanized: Zhenskaya khokkeynaya liga, lit. 'Women's Hockey League') or ZhHL, officially called the Women's Hockey League (WHL), is a professional ice hockey league in Russia, currently comprising seven teams. The league is also known as the PariMatch Women's Hockey League for sponsorship reasons.

The league was founded via a joint partnership of the Kontinental Hockey League (KHL) and the Ice Hockey Federation of Russia (FHR) on 19 June 2015. It replaced the Russian Women's Hockey League (RWHL), which had been founded in 1995 and was operated by the FHR alone.

== History ==
The creation of the Zhenskaya Hockey League was announced on 12 September 2014 at a meeting of Alexander Medvedev, president of the Kontinental Hockey League (KHL), and Vladislav Tretiak, president of the Ice Hockey Federation of Russia (FHR). The parties expressed their readiness to jointly establish the ZhHL and to achieve the dream of taking women's hockey in Russia to a new level of development. However, the FHR established the Zhenskaya Hockey League independently. There was a meeting with representatives of different Russian women's hockey teams on 2 July 2014. On the same day, the Honored Master of Sports, Alexei Yashin, was elected as president of the league while Yevgeny Chizhmin was appointed as the league's executive director.

However, the process of creating the league stalled because of a disagreement of the KHL with the fact that the Ice Hockey Federation of Russia established the league without reaching an agreement with the KHL, and on 22 December 2014, Alexei Yashin said in an interview with Championat.com: "While all this is a little suspended, what will happen next is hard for me to say. The management has made such a decision about changes in the KHL, which is what it is. I have a very good relationship with Alexander Ivanovich Medvedev. I think he did a lot for our hockey. I have not talked with Dmitry Chernyshenko yet. As for the women's league, when we talked, there was a certain situation that the KHL, FHR and Ruslan Gutnov would participate in the creation and development of this project. Now, while this process has slowed down, it's difficult for me to talk about terms."

The KHL, with the FHR, returned to the subject of the ZhHL in 2015. On 23 April 2015, the FHR Executive Committee voted to transfer the rights to host the women's ice hockey Russian Championship to the KHL. On 19 June 2015, the KHL established the Zhenskaya Hockey League, holding a presentation of a new league in the Ministry of Sport of Russia. On 8 September 2015, after the first matches of the championship of the ZhHL, the Board of Directors of the KHL approved the Rules of the League Championship.

Prior to the 2016–17 season, an eighth team, Dinamo Kursk, was supposed to be added to compete in the league. However, on 5 September 2016, despite the league taking all possible measures to ensure they would take part, Dinamo Kursk ultimately withdrew from the competition due to unresolved organizational and logistical issues. On 25 July 2019, the Shenzhen KRS Vanke Rays announced it was joining the ZhHL for the 2019–20 season.

== Teams ==
=== 2026–27 season ===
Location of Zhenskaya Hockey League teams in Russia
Location of ZhHL teams in Western Russia

The number of teams participating in the Zhenskaya Hockey League regular season has declined from a high of ten at the start of the 2021–22 season. Three teams ceased operations during the 2021 to 2026 period: Ice Wings Yaroslavl during the 2021–22 season and both Torpedo Nizhny Novgorod and MSMO 7.62 after the 2024–25 season. China-based KRS Shenzhen withdrew to join the Chinese Women's Ice Hockey League after the 2022–23 season. Sakhalin Yuzhno-Sakhalinsk joined the league ahead of the 2025–26 season and the league has continued with seven teams since.

HC Tornado was rebranded as Khimik Voskresensk in September 2026.

Head coach Arkadiy Belousov's contract with Belye Medveditsy was "terminated by mutual agreement" on 7 October 2026, three days before the team was scheduled to play their first game of the 2026–27 season. Belye Medveditsy assistant coach Lyubov Vafina has filled the role as head coach since Belousov's departure.

Team name	Location	Home venue	Head coach	Captain
Agidel	Ufa	City Sports Palace	Valeriy Davletshin	Maria Pechnikova
Belye Medveditsy	Chelyabinsk	Traktor Ice Arena	Lyubov Vafina	Alina Matveyeva
Biryusa	Krasnoyarsk	Platinum Arena	Aleksandr Vedernikov	Yelizaveta Zenchenko
Dynamo-Neva	Saint Petersburg	Jubilee Sports Complex	Yuriy Mamontov	Yekaterina Dobrodeyeva
Khimik	Voskresensk	Podmoskovye Ice Palace	Aleksandr Syrtsov	Yelena Zaripova
Sakhalin	Yuzhno-Sakhalinsk	Ice Palace Kristall	Aleksandr Zybin	Angelina Goncharenko
SKSO	Yekaterinburg	Ice Arena Avto	Sergey Chistyakov	Karina Akhmetova

=== Former teams ===
- MSMO 7.62, Voskresensk
- Torpedo, Nizhny Novgorod

== Russian Champions ==
- 1996 : Luzhniki Moscow
- 1997 : CSK VVS Moscow
- 1998 : CSK VVS Moscow
- 1999 : Viking Moscow
- 2000 : Spartak-Mercury Yekaterinburg
- 2001 : SKIF Moscow
- 2002 : SKIF Moscow
- 2003 : SKIF Moscow
- 2004 : SKIF Moscow
- 2005 : SKIF Moscow
- 2006 : HC Tornado
- 2007 : HC Tornado
- 2008 : SKIF Nizhny Novgorod
- 2009 : HC Tornado
- 2010 : SKIF Nizhny Novgorod
- 2011 : HC Tornado
- 2012 : HC Tornado
- 2013 : HC Tornado
- 2014 : SKIF Nizhny Novgorod
- 2015 : HC Tornado
- 2016 : HC Tornado
- 2017 : HC Tornado
- 2018 : Agidel Ufa
- 2019 : Agidel Ufa
- 2020 : KRS Vanke Rays
- 2021 : Agidel Ufa
- 2022 : KRS Vanke Rays
- 2023 : Agidel Ufa
- 2024 : Dynamo-Neva St. Petersburg
- 2025 : Agidel Ufa
- 2026 : Agidel Ufa

=== Russian Champions by season ===
Year	Champion	Runners-up	Third Place
Russian Women's Hockey League
1995–96	Luzhniki Moscow	Uralochka-Auto Yekaterinburg	Lokomotiv Krasnoyarsk
1996–97	CSK VVS Moscow	Spartak Yekaterinburg	Lokomotiv Krasnoyarsk
1997–98	CSK VVS Moscow	Spartak Yekaterinburg	Spartak Moscow
1998–99	Viking Moscow	Spartak-Mercury Yekaterinburg	Lokomotiv Krasnoyarsk
1999–2000	Spartak-Mercury Yekaterinburg	Viking Moscow	Lokomotiv Krasnoyarsk
2000–01	SKIF Moscow	Spartak-Mercury Yekaterinburg	Lokomotiv Krasnoyarsk
2001–02	SKIF Moscow	Spartak-Mercury Yekaterinburg	Lokomotiv Krasnoyarsk
2002–03	SKIF Moscow	Spartak-Mercury Yekaterinburg	Lokomotiv Krasnoyarsk
2003–04	SKIF Moscow	HC Tornado	Spartak-Mercury Yekaterinburg
2004–05	SKIF Moscow	HC Tornado	Spartak-Mercury Yekaterinburg
2005–06	HC Tornado	SKIF Moscow	Spartak-Mercury Yekaterinburg
2006–07	HC Tornado	SKIF Nizhny Novgorod	Spartak-Mercury Yekaterinburg
2007–08	SKIF Nizhny Novgorod	HC Tornado	Spartak-Mercury Yekaterinburg
2008–09	HC Tornado	SKIF Nizhny Novgorod	Lokomotiv-Energia Krasnoyarsk
2009–10	SKIF Nizhny Novgorod	HC Tornado	Spartak-Mercury Yekaterinburg
2010–11	HC Tornado	SKIF Nizhny Novgorod	Fakel Chelyabinsk
2011–12	HC Tornado	SKIF Nizhny Novgorod	Agidel Ufa
2012–13	HC Tornado	SKIF Nizhny Novgorod	Agidel Ufa
2013–14	SKIF Nizhny Novgorod	HC Tornado	Agidel Ufa
2014–15	HC Tornado	SKIF Nizhny Novgorod	Agidel Ufa
Zhenskaya Hockey League
2015–16	HC Tornado	Agidel Ufa	Biryusa Krasnoyarsk
2016–17	HC Tornado	Agidel Ufa	Dinamo Saint Petersburg
2017–18	Agidel Ufa	HC Tornado	SKIF Nizhny Novgorod
2018–19	Agidel Ufa	Dinamo Saint Petersburg	SKIF Nizhny Novgorod
2019–20	KRS Vanke Rays	Agidel Ufa	HC Tornado/Biryusa Krasnoyarsk
2020–21	Agidel Ufa	KRS Vanke Rays	SKIF Nizhny Novgorod/Biryusa Krasnoyarsk
2021–22	KRS Vanke Rays	SKIF Nizhny Novgorod	HC Tornado/Dynamo-Neva St. Petersburg
2022–23	Agidel Ufa	Dynamo-Neva St. Petersburg	Biryusa Krasnoyarsk/Torpedo Nizhny Novgorod
2023–24	Dynamo-Neva St. Petersburg	Biryusa Krasnoyarsk	Agidel Ufa/Torpedo Nizhny Novgorod
2024–25	Agidel Ufa	Dynamo-Neva St. Petersburg	Torpedo Nizhny Novgorod
2025–26	Agidel Ufa	Torpedo Nizhny Novgorod	Biryusa Krasnoyarsk

=== All-time Russian Championship titles ===
Team	Titles	Years won
HC SKIF	12	1996, 1997, 1998, 1999, 2001, 2002, 2003, 2004, 2005, 2008, 2010, 2014
HC Tornado	9	2006, 2007, 2009, 2011, 2012, 2013, 2015, 2016, 2017
Agidel Ufa	6	2018, 2019, 2021, 2023, 2025, 2026
KRS Shenzhen	2	2020, 2022
Spartak-Mercury Yekaterinburg	1	2000
Dynamo-Neva St. Petersburg	1	2024
