= Ice hockey at the 2017 Winter Universiade =

Tournament details
- Host country: Kazakhstan
- Venues: 2 (in 1 host city)
- Dates: January 28 – February 8 (men); January 28 – February 6 (women)

Official website
- FISU.net

Ice hockey at the 2017 Winter Universiade comprised two ice hockey tournaments – a men's tournament and a women's tournament – during the Almaty 2017 edition of the Universiade (renamed FISU World University Games in 2020). The men's tournament was held from January 28 through February 8 at Halyk Arena and the women's tournament was held from January 28 to February 6 at Baluan Sholak Sports Palace.

The selection of participating teams - twelve in the men's tournament and seven in the women's tournament, including the hosting Kazakhstan sides in both cases - was announced on July 25, 2016 while the draw to place the teams into their assigned pools took place on September 18, 2016.

== Venues ==
Almaty
| Men | Women |
| Halyk Arena; Capacity: 3000 | Baluan Sholak Sports Palace; Capacity: 5000 |

== Men ==
2017 Winter Universiade men's tournament
Tournament details
- Venue: 1 (in 1 host city)
- Dates: January 28 – February 8
- Teams: 12

Final positions
- Champions: Russia (7th title)
- Runners-up: Kazakhstan
- Third place: Canada
- Fourth place: Czech Republic

Tournament statistics
- Games played: 34
- Goals scored: 304 (8.94 per game)
- Attendance: 83,693 (2,462 per game)
- Scoring leader: (Russia) Andrei Alekseev (13 points)

Official website
- FISU.net

=== Preliminary round ===
Twelve participating teams were placed in the following three groups. After playing a round-robin within the group, the teams ranked 1st through 8th overall advanced to the quarterfinals.

Teams received 3 points for a regulation win, 2 points for an overtime/shootout win and 1 point for an overtime/shootout loss. They were then seeded for the playoff round by points per game played, then by goal differential.

All game box scores via wuni2017.sportresult.com

==== Group A ====
| Team | Pld | W | OTW | OTL | L | GF | GA | GD | Pts | Qualification |
|---|---|---|---|---|---|---|---|---|---|---|
| Kazakhstan | 3 | 3 | 0 | 0 | 0 | 35 | 0 | +35 | 9 | Advanced to quarterfinals |
| Czech Republic | 3 | 2 | 0 | 0 | 1 | 20 | 8 | +12 | 6 | Advanced to quarterfinals |
| Sweden | 3 | 1 | 0 | 0 | 2 | 15 | 10 | +5 | 3 | Advanced to quarterfinals |
| China | 3 | 0 | 0 | 0 | 3 | 0 | 52 | −52 | 0 | 9th–12th placement round |

All times are local (UTC+6).

| January 28, 2017; 19:30 | Kazakhstan | 22–0 (9–0, 6–0, 7–0) | China | Halyk Arena, Almaty; Attendance: 3040 |

Game reference

Sergey Kudryavtsev
Pavel Poluektov
Goalies
Wu Juankun
Referee:
Chrisoffe Holm (SWE)
Alexey Roshchyn (ESP)
Linesmen:
Choi Sukbae (KOR)
Patrick Richardson (USA)

| 1:12 – V. Grebenshchikov (K. Savitskiy, A. Petrov) | 1–0 |
| 1:39 – A. Assetov (A. Pissarev) | 2–0 |
| 5:17 – A. Sagadeyev (A. Assetov) | 3–0 |
| 8:51 – D. Grents (I. Stepanenko, N. Mikhailis) (PP) | 4–0 |
| 10:15 – V. Nikulin | 5–0 |
| 10:48 – A. Burdelev (P. Akolzin, A. Nurek) | 6–0 |
| 11:36 – K. Savitskiy (M. Rakhmanov, V. Grebenshchikov) | 7–0 |
| 12:39 – A. Burdelev (K. Savenkov, P. Akolzin) | 8–0 |
| 19:59 – A. Antsiferov (A. Assetov, M. Ibraibekov) | 9–0 |
| 20:58 – A. Burdelev (K. Savenkov) | 10–0 |
| 26:18 – M. Rakhmanov (K. Savitskiy, A. Petrov) | 11–0 |
| 29:46 – A. Sagadeyev (SH) | 12–0 |
| 34:53 – A. Burdelev (K. Savenkov, A. Nurek) | 13–0 |
| 37:00 – A. Assetov (A. Sagadeyev) | 14–0 |
| 39:42 – A. Assetov (A. Antsiferov) | 15–0 |
| 41:56 – K. Savitskiy (V. Nikulin, S. Zinchenko) (PP) | 16–0 |
| 44:28 – A. Burdelev (K. Savenkov, A. Nurek) | 17–0 |
| 46:35 – I. Stepanenko (M. Ibraibekov, Y. Yevdokimov) | 18–0 |
| 51:56 – K. Savenkov (G. Dulnev, V. Nikulin) | 19–0 |
| 52:37 – M. Rakhmanov (S. Zinchenko, K. Savitskiy) | 20–0 |
| 53:53 – D. Grents (N. Mikhailis) | 21–0 |
| 56:54 – Y. Yevdokimov (M. Ibraibekov, D. Grents) | 22–0 |

4 min
Penalties
4 min
102
Shots
10

| January 30, 2017; 16:00 | Sweden | 0–5 (0–1, 0–4, 0–0) | Czech Republic | Halyk Arena, Almaty; Attendance: 3000 |

Game reference

Joakim Moritz
Goalies
Jaroslav Brazdil
Referee:
Patrick Fichtner (AUS)
Lucas Martin (USA)
Linesmen:
Mike Harrington (CAN)
Patrick Richardson (USA)

| 0–1 | 7:47 – O. Krpata |
| 0–2 | 21:21 – P. Hucko (D. Novak, M. Zboril) |
| 0–3 | 35:03 – J. Muller (SH) |
| 0–4 | 35:26 – D. Arnost (D. Steiner, J. Muller) (SH) |
| 0–5 | 39:30 – M. Kaluza (D. Novak, D. Zachar) (PP) |

12 min
Penalties
14 min
12
Shots
46

| January 31, 2017; 19:30 | Kazakhstan | 5–0 (2–0, 1–0, 2–0) | Sweden | Halyk Arena, Almaty; Attendance: 2800 |

Game reference

Pavel Poluektov
Goalies
Daniel Hansen
Referee:
Lucas Wilcox (USA)
Vladimir Snasel (SVK)
Linesmen:
Choi Sukbae (KOR)
Nikita Viliugin (RUS)

| 2:06 – K. Savitskiy (M. Rakhmanov, V. Grebenshchikov) | 1–0 |
| 17:10 – Y. Yevdokimov (D. Grents, I. Stepanenko) (PP) | 2–0 |
| 35:10 – K. Savenkov (A. Petrov) | 3–0 |
| 49:11 – A. Sagadeyev (A. Antsiferov) | 4–0 |
| 56:57 – D. Grents (K. Savitskiy, N. Mikhailis) (PP) | 5–0 |

14 min
Penalties
12 min
55
Shots
11

| February 1, 2017; 19:30 | Czech Republic | 15–0 (6–0, 3–0, 6–0) | China | Halyk Arena, Almaty; Attendance: 1700 |

Game reference

Josef Novak
Goalies
Wu Jiankun
Referee:
Stefan Hogarth (GBR)
Arkadiy Subbotin (KAZ)
Linesmen:
Choi Sukbae (KOR)
Christopher Wells (GBR)

| 1:36 – D. Arnost (J. Sedlak) | 1–0 |
| 2:26 – T. Stastny (M. Brzobohaty) | 2–0 |
| 5:07 – D. Arnost (M. Kaluza) (PP) | 3–0 |
| 10:42 – F. Svaricek | 4–0 |
| 11:29 – J. Kadlec | 5–0 |
| 16:54 – D. Ballner (M. Bail, D. Kafka) (PP) | 6–0 |
| 20:32 – D. Steiner (M. Gutwald, D. Arnost) (PP) | 7–0 |
| 25:24 – T. Stastny (F. Matula, M. Brzobohaty) (PP) | 8–0 |
| 38:38 – P. Hucko (M. Kaluza, D. Novak) (PP) | 9–0 |
| 40:18 – D. Kafka (J. Sedlak, D. Zachar) | 10–0 |
| 48:51 – D. Ballner (D. Zachar, M. Bail) | 11–0 |
| 52:53 – F. Matula | 12–0 |
| 53:35 – D. Kafka (D. Ballner, D. Zachar) | 13–0 |
| 55:06 – P. Hucko (D. Zachar, M. Kaluza) (PP) | 14–0 |
| 55:28 – M. Brzobohaty (F. Matula) | 15–0 |

12 min
Penalties
16 min
84
Shots
7

| February 2, 2017; 19:30 | China | 0–15 (0–5, 0–6, 0–4) | Sweden | Halyk Arena, Almaty; Attendance: 2271 |

Game reference

Wu Jiankun
Zhou Tongzhe
Goalies
Joakim Moritz
Referee:
Alexey Roshchyn (ESP)
Arkadiy Subbotin (KAZ)
Linesmen:
Patrick Richardson (USA)
Michal Zika (CZE)

| 0–1 | 0:49 – D. Pettersson |
| 0–2 | 3:06 – D. Pettersson (O. Eriksson, V. Hjartquist) |
| 0–3 | 4:12 – O. Eriksson (E. Piscator, D. Pettersson) |
| 0–4 | 12:03 – L. Lundberg (H. Gronlund) |
| 0–5 | 12:24 – E. Lyrvall (O. Eriksson) |
| 0–6 | 20:16 – D. Pettersson |
| 0–7 | 20:59 – J. Saldeen (D. Pettersson, E. Lyrvall) (PP) |
| 0–8 | 23:51 – L. Lundberg (V. Anderberg, A. Gronros) |
| 0–9 | 25:49 – V. Anderberg (A. Gronros, G. Werneman) |
| 0–10 | 30:20 – O. Eriksson (D. Pettersson) |
| 0–11 | 39:32 – L. Lundberg (G. Werneman) (SH) |
| 0–12 | 46:30 – A. Gronros (D. Pettersson) |
| 0–13 | 50:58 – M. Ortevall (J. Vestberg) (PP) |
| 0–14 | 57:58 – O. Eriksson (J. Vestberg) (PP) |
| 0–15 | 58:49 – H. Gronlund (G. Werneman) |

12 min
Penalties
6 min
6
Shots
65

| February 3, 2017; 19:30 | Czech Republic | 0–8 (0–1, 0–3, 0–4) | Kazakhstan | Halyk Arena, Almaty; Attendance: 3091 |

Game reference

Jaroslav Brazdil
Josef Novak
Goalies
Sergey Kudryavtsev
Referee:
Alexey Roshchyn (ESP)
Vladimir Snasel (SVK)
Linesmen:
Tomas Regec (SVK)
Christopher Wells (GBR)

| 0–1 | 15:42 – K. Savenkov (G. Dulnev, A. Nurek) |
| 0–2 | 23:12 – A. Burdelev (K. Savenkov, P. Akolzin) |
| 0–3 | 24:59 – D. Grents (A. Antsiferov) |
| 0–4 | 36:46 – N. Mikhailis (D. Grents, K. Savitskiy) (PP) |
| 0–5 | 40:15 – K. Savenkov (P. Akolzin, G. Dulnev) |
| 0–6 | 50:25 – A. Petrov (SH) |
| 0–7 | 51:43 – K. Savitskiy (N. Mikhailis, Y. Yevdokimov) (PP) |
| 0–8 | 52:25 – A. Burdelev (A. Nurek, P. Akolzin) (PP) |

18 min
Penalties
16 min
21
Shots
46

==== Group B ====
| Team | Pld | W | OTW | OTL | L | GF | GA | GD | Pts | Qualification |
|---|---|---|---|---|---|---|---|---|---|---|
| Canada | 3 | 3 | 0 | 0 | 0 | 25 | 3 | +22 | 9 | Advanced to quarterfinals |
| Slovakia | 3 | 2 | 0 | 0 | 1 | 16 | 6 | +10 | 6 | Advanced to quarterfinals |
| United States | 3 | 1 | 0 | 0 | 2 | 11 | 11 | 0 | 3 | 9th–12th placement round |
| Great Britain | 3 | 0 | 0 | 0 | 3 | 1 | 33 | −32 | 0 | 9th–12th placement round |

All times are local (UTC+6).

| January 28, 2017; 12:30 | Slovakia | 9–0 (3–0, 2–0, 4–0) | Great Britain | Halyk Arena, Almaty; Attendance: 1600 |

Game reference

Juraj Halo
Samuel Kosut
Goalies
Adam Long
Matthew Croyle
Referee:
Arkadiy Subbotin (KAZ)
Michael Tscherrig (SUI)
Linesmen:
Mike Harrington (CAN)
David Laksola (SWE)

| 2:53 – E. Piacka (R. Gabor, M. Uhnak) (SH) | 1–0 |
| 4:11 – I. Jakubic (M. Kabac, M. Uhnak) | 2–0 |
| 18:42 – T. Hluch (P. Gapa, J. Tomcak) | 3–0 |
| 20:38 – E. Piacka (M. Pichnarcik, M. Uhnak) | 4–0 |
| 28:07 – M. Pichnarcik (E. Piacka, M. Uhnak) (PP) | 5–0 |
| 43:07 – I. Brezniak (J. Loydl, A. Sucharda) (PP) | 6–0 |
| 53:11 – I. Jakubic (M. Kabac, I. Brezniak) | 7–0 |
| 53:44 – T. Hluch (P. Gapa, J. Tomcak) | 8–0 |
| 56:57 – I. Jakubic (I. Brezniak, A. Sucharda) | 9–0 |

12 min
Penalties
14 min
61
Shots
13

| January 30, 2017; 19:30 | United States | 0–6 (0–1, 0–3, 0–2) | Canada | Halyk Arena, Almaty; Attendance: 3000 |

Game reference

Jordan Gluck
Goalies
Kevin Bailie
Referee:
Christoffe Holm (SWE)
Vladimir Snasel (SVK)
Linesmen:
Nikita Viliugin (RUS)
Michal Zika (CZE)

| 0–1 | 0:30 – B. Pedersen (S. Simmonds, E. Boutet) |
| 0–2 | 24:58 – B. Pedersen (E. Boutet) |
| 0–3 | 27:01 – B. Welychka (M. Lefebvre, M. McNamee) (PP) |
| 0–4 | 33:38 – S. Abraham |
| 0–5 | 47:28 – B. Welychka (M. Lefebvre, M. McNamee) (PP) |
| 0–6 | 58:11 – S. Abraham (M. Pompei) |

14 min
Penalties
24 min
17
Shots
40

| January 31, 2017; 16:00 | Slovakia | 4–1 (2–1, 1–0, 1–0) | United States | Halyk Arena, Almaty; Attendance: 1774 |

Game reference

Peter Putec
Goalies
Joseph Olen
Referee:
Stefan Hogarth (GBR)
Alexey Roshchyn (ESP)
Linesmen:
Christopher Wells (GBR)
Michal Zika (CZE)

| 6:45 – M. Uhnak (M. Pichnarcik, R. Gabor) (PP) | 1–0 |
| 7:02 – I. Jakubik (I. Brezniak) | 2–0 |
| | 2–1 | 9:12 – T. Herndon (A. Uglem, M. Anders) (PP) |
| 26:58 – P. Gapa | 3–1 |
| 59:35 – I. Brezniak (J. Tomcak) (SH, EN) | 4–1 |

26 min
Penalties
16 min
28
Shots
30

| February 1, 2017; 16:00 | Canada | 14–0 (6–0, 3–0, 5–0) | Great Britain | Halyk Arena, Almaty; Attendance: 2200 |

Game reference

Sebastien Auger
Goalies
Matthew Croyle
Referee:
Patrick Fichtner (AUT)
Christian Persson (SWE)
Linesmen:
Tomas Regec (SVK)
Patrick Richardson (USA)

| 0:45 – S. Abraham (R. Van Stralen, A. Basso) | 1–0 |
| 3:23 – G. Asselin (M. McNamee) | 2–0 |
| 5:47 – B. Pedersen (S. Simmonds, R. Van Stralen) | 3–0 |
| 7:43 – G. Asselin (M. Pompei, S. Doggett) (PP) | 4–0 |
| 14:25 – B. Welychka (S. Doggett, M. Lefebvre) (PP) | 5–0 |
| 17:31 – T. Giroux (E. Ming) | 6–0 |
| 22:24 – O. Hinse (E. Ming) | 7–0 |
| 23:58 – B. Welychka (P. Morin, M. McNamee) (PP) | 8–0 |
| 30:10 – P. Morin (N. Chiarlitti, M. Lefebvre) | 9–0 |
| 45:37 – M. McNamee (G. Asselin, M. Pompei) | 10–0 |
| 48:40 – M. Lefebvre (B. Welychka, T. Giroux) (PP) | 11–0 |
| 50:32 – P. Morin (E. Boutet, T. Giroux) | 12–0 |
| 52:39 – S. Abraham (G. Asselin, S. Doggett) | 13–0 |
| 54:41 – C. Durocher (M. McNamee) | 14–0 |

14 min
Penalties
14 min
74
Shots
9

| February 2, 2017; 12:30 | Great Britain | 1–10 (1–3, 0–4, 0–3) | United States | Halyk Arena, Almaty; Attendance: 1836 |

Game reference

Adam Long
Matthew Croyle
Goalies
Jordan Gluck
Referee:
Christoffe Holm (SWE)
Christian Persson (SWE)
Linesmen:
David Laksola (SWE)
Vladimir Yefremov (KAZ)

| | 0–1 | 3:14 – M. Cummings (A. Temby) (PP) |
| | 0–2 | 4:14 – J. Hall (T. Groat, A. Wilk) |
| | 0–3 | 15:43 – M. Anders (A. Temby, J. Breslin) |
| 17:02 – L. Charnock (C. Cooke) (PP) | 1–3 |
| | 1–4 | 20:58 – T. Groat (J. Uglem) |
| | 1–5 | 25:23 – J. Breslin (T. Groat) |
| | 1–6 | 35:42 – M. Anders (J. Uglem) |
| | 1–7 | 36:48 – J. McGing (S. Murphy) |
| | 1–8 | 42:31 – T. Herndon (J. Breslin, J. Uglem) |
| | 1–9 | 50:52 – J. Breslin (J. Uglem, T. Opilka) (PP) |
| | 1–10 | 54:15 – M. Anders (T. Herndon, J. McGing) |

20 min
Penalties
10 min
13
Shots
78

| February 3, 2017; 12:30 | Canada | 5–3 (1–0, 3–2, 1–1) | Slovakia | Halyk Arena, Almaty; Attendance: 2571 |

Game reference

Kevin Bailie
Goalies
Samuel Kosut
Referee:
Lucas Martin (USA)
Michael Tscherrig (SUI)
Linesmen:
David Laksola (SWE)
Nikita Viliugin (RUS)

| 6:42 – P. Morin (B. Welychka, T. Giroux) (PP) | 1–0 |
| | 1–1 | 21:12 – E. Piacka (I. Jakubic) (PP) |
| 23:21 – M. Lefebvre (A. Basso, M. Pompei) (PP) | 2–1 |
| | 2–2 | 27:59 – I. Brezniak (M. Kabac) |
| 34:47 – S. Abraham (S. Doggett) (PP) | 3–2 |
| 35:48 – P. Morin (M. McNamee, B. Welychka) (PP) | 4–2 |
| | 4–3 | 49:34 – P. Gapa (S. Ivanic, T. Hluch) (PP) |
| 52:39 – S. Doggett (R. Van Stralen, E. Ming) | 5–3 |

24 min
Penalties
22 min
35
Shots
26

==== Group C ====
| Team | Pld | W | OTW | OTL | L | GF | GA | GD | Pts | Qualification |
|---|---|---|---|---|---|---|---|---|---|---|
| Russia | 3 | 3 | 0 | 0 | 0 | 35 | 1 | +34 | 9 | Advanced to quarterfinals |
| Latvia | 3 | 1 | 1 | 0 | 1 | 11 | 12 | −1 | 5 | Advanced to quarterfinals |
| Japan | 3 | 1 | 0 | 1 | 1 | 8 | 20 | −12 | 4 | Advanced to quarterfinals |
| South Korea | 3 | 0 | 0 | 0 | 3 | 4 | 25 | −21 | 0 | 9th–12th placement round |

All times are local (UTC+6).

| January 28, 2017; 16:00 | Japan | 3–4 OT (2–1, 0–2, 1–0) (OT: 0–1) | Latvia | Halyk Arena, Almaty; Attendance: 1580 |

Game reference

Shun Furukawa
Goalies
Reinis Petkus
Referee:
Stefan Hogarth (GBR)
Christian Persson (SWE)
Linesmen:
Tomas Regec (SVK)
Vladimir Yefremov (KAZ)

| 0:29 – S. Hitosato (K. Deguchi) | 1–0 |
| 8:13 – K. Suzuki (S. Sato) (PP) | 2–0 |
| | 2–1 | 18:34 – O. Aploks (O. Sislannikovs, I. Makarovs) (PP) |
| | 2–2 | 29:39 – K. Apsitis (I. Makarovs, O. Sislannikovs) (PP) |
| | 2–3 | 32:39 – S. Grinbergs (SH) |
| 54:40 – K. Deguchi (S. Hitosato) | 3–3 |
| | 3–4 | 60:18 – M. Mezulis (S. Zolmanis, M. Dilevka) |

18 min
Penalties
22 min
28
Shots
40

| January 30, 2017; 12:30 | South Korea | 0–14 (0–4, 0–6, 0–4) | Russia | Halyk Arena, Almaty; Attendance: 3000 |

Game reference

Lee Han-back
Lee Chang-hun
Goalies
Ilia Andriukhov
Referee:
Christian Persson (SWE)
Arkadiy Subbotin (KAZ)
Linesmen:
Christopher Wells (GBR)
Vladimir Yefremov (KAZ)

| 0–1 | 6:07 – A. Erofeev (V. Efremov) (SH) |
| 0–2 | 8:00 – N. Sirotkin (I. Ivanov, D. Ilyin) |
| 0–3 | 8:36 – D. Kirillov (A. Erofeev) |
| 0–4 | 8:52 – V. Shutov (S. Zabornikov, D. Kirillov) |
| 0–5 | 23:53 – A. Alekseev (PS) |
| 0–6 | 26:44 – D. Ilyin (D. Kirillov) |
| 0–7 | 27:13 – K. Pilipenko (D. Kirillov) |
| 0–8 | 28:13 – S. Zabornikov (M. Kudriashov) (PP) |
| 0–9 | 28:35 – M. Orlov (R. Tatalin) |
| 0–10 | 38:20 – K. Pilipenko |
| 0–11 | 42:35 – D. Kirillov |
| 0–12 | 45:09 – V. Efremov (K. Pilipenko) |
| 0–13 | 52:54 – A. Tarasov (A. Osipov, A. Alekseev) |
| 0–14 | 58:17 – A. Osipov (R. Tatalin, M. Orlov) |

8 min
Penalties
4 min
10
Shots
73

| January 31, 2017; 12:30 | Japan | 5–2 (0–1, 2–1, 3–0) | South Korea | Halyk Arena, Almaty; Attendance: 933 |

Game reference

Shotaro Kaneko
Goalies
Lee Han-back
Referee:
Patrick Fichtner (AUT)
Michael Tscherrig (SUI)
Linesmen:
David Laksola (SWE)
Tomas Regec (SVK)

| | 0–1 | 5:57 – Chang Y-w. (Jung J-h., Lee K-s.) (PP) |
| 23:53 – S. Kawaguchi (J. Inui) | 1–1 |
| | 1–2 | 32:39 – Choi Y-i. |
| 35:11 – K. Kawamura (K. Matsumoto) (SH) | 2–2 |
| 55:56 – K. Tanaka (R. Katsuragawa, R. Matsumoto) | 3–2 |
| 59:03 – K. Kawamura (K. Suzuko) (EN) | 4–2 |
| 59:27 – S. Hitosato (J. Inui) | 5–2 |

14 min
Penalties
12 min
40
Shots
19

| February 1, 2017; 12:30 | Russia | 7–1 (2–0, 1–1, 4–0) | Latvia | Halyk Arena, Almaty; Attendance: 1700 |

Game reference

Ilia Andriukhov
Goalies
Reinis Petkus
Referee:
Christoffe Holm (SWE)
Michael Tscherrig (SUI)
Linesmen:
Mike Harrington (CAN)
Vladimir Yefremov (KAZ)

| 1:37 – R. Kudinov (N. Sirotkin) | 1–0 |
| 4:46 – A. Alekseev (Y. Kozlovskiy) | 2–0 |
| | 2–1 | 28:36 – O. Aploks (O. Sislannikovs) (PP) |
| 31:33 – N. Sirotkin (I. Ivanov, M. Orlov) | 3–1 |
| 43:05 – N. Sirotkin (R. Kudinov, I. Ivanov) (PP) | 4–1 |
| 43:54 - A. Osipov (D. Kirillov, S. Zabornikov) | 5–1 |
| 57:41 – A. Tarasov (A. Alekseev) (SH) | 6–1 |
| 59:16 – D. Ilyin (I. Ivanov, S. Zabornikov) (PP) | 7–1 |

18 min
Penalties
12 min
47
Shots
24

| February 2, 2017; 16:00 | Latvia | 6–2 (4–0, 1–2, 1–0) | South Korea | Halyk Arena, Almaty; Attendance: 1940 |

Game reference

Reinis Petkus
Goalies
Lee Han Back
Lee Chang Hun
Referee:
Lucas Wilcox (USA)
Vladimir Snasel (SVK)
Linesmen:
Mike Harrington (CAN)
Nikita Viliugin (RUS)

| 5:58 – J. Ziemins (S. Zolmanis) (PP) | 1–0 |
| 10:49 – R. Rosinskis (A. Ogorodnikovs, S. Grinbergs) | 2–0 |
| 14:32 – O. Sislannikovs (O. Aploks) | 3–0 |
| 18:48 – J. Ziemins (V. Minajevs, S. Zolmanis) (PP) | 4–0 |
| | 4–1 | 26:11 – Kim Y-h. (Choi Y-i., Song H-c.) |
| 28:15 – O. Sislannikovs (O. Aploks) | 5–1 |
| | 5–2 | 35:32 – Hwang D-h. (Son T-k., Kim D-h.) (PP) |
| 52:08 – J. Bullitis (R. Rosinskis, K. Millers) | 6–2 |

14 min
Penalties
10 min
46
Shots
16

| February 3, 2017; 16:00 | Russia | 14–0 (5–0, 1–0, 8–0) | Japan | Halyk Arena, Almaty; Attendance: 2800 |

Game reference

Ilia Andriukhov
Alexander Samonov
Goalies
Shun Furukawa
Shotaro Kaneko
Referee:
Patrick Fichtner (AUT)
Stefan Hogarth (GBR)
Linesmen:
Choi Sukbae (KOR)
Michal Zika (CZE)

| 2:39 – I. Ivanov | 1–0 |
| 3:31 – V. Shutov (M. Orlov, V. Efremov) | 2–0 |
| 13:49 – A. Alekseev (A. Tarasov) (PP) | 3–0 |
| 15:49 – D. Kirillov (A. Alekseev, S. Zabornikov) | 4–0 |
| 19:37 – I. Ivanov (M. Kudriashov) | 5–0 |
| 23:16 – M. Orlov (V. Efremov, K. Pilipenko) (PP) | 6–0 |
| 43:45 – R. Tatalin (V. Efremov) (SH) | 7–0 |
| 50:19 – R. Tatalin | 8–0 |
| 50:58 – A. Alekseev (S. Zabornikov) | 9–0 |
| 51:11 – M. Orlov (R. Tatalin, V. Efremov) | 10–0 |
| 56:24 – A. Alekseev (V. Shutov, D. Kirillov) | 11–0 |
| 59:10 – V. Shutov (A. Alekseev, A. Tarasov) (PP) | 12–0 |
| 59:31 – A. Erofeev (M. Orlov) | 13–0 |
| 59:53 – N. Sirotkin | 14–0 |

10 min
Penalties
16 min
54
Shots
8

=== 9th–12th placement round ===
All times are local (UTC+6).

| February 4, 2017; 12:30 | United States | 17–1 (5–0, 5–1, 7–0) | China | Halyk Arena, Almaty; Attendance: 2861 |

Game reference

Joseph Olen
Goalies
Wu Jiankun
Zhou Tongzhe
Referee:
Patrick Fichtner (AUT)
Stefan Hogarth (GBR)
Linesmen:
Choi Sukbae (KOR)
Christopher Wells (GBR)

| 7:43 – J. McGing (T. Herndon, A. Temby) (PP) | 1–0 |
| 12:06 – A. Uglem (M. Cummings) | 2–0 |
| 13:33 – T. Groat (J. Hall, A. Temby) | 3–0 |
| 14:02 – T. Groat (T. Opilka, J. Simmonds) | 4–0 |
| 16:26 – S. Murphy (A. Wilk, J. McGing) | 5–0 |
| 27:03 – T. Herndon (A. Wilk, J. Hall) (PP) | 6–0 |
| 27:24 – M. Rudin (J. Uglem, A. Wilk) | 7–0 |
| 31:29 – M. Rudin (J. Breslin, A. Wilk) | 8–0 |
| 34:32 – S. Murphy (J. McGing) | 9–0 |
| | 9–1 | 37:07 – Yue X. (Qian J., Ji P.) (PP) |
| 38:19 – S. Murphy (J. Uglem, A. Wilk) | 10–1 |
| 41:34 – M. Rudin (A. Wilk) | 11–1 |
| 44:34 – M. Cummings (M. Hartman, A. Uglem) (PP) | 12–1 |
| 45:33 – J. McGing (M. Anders, T. Opilka) | 13–1 |
| 51:11 – T. Herndon (A. Wilk) | 14–1 |
| 51:35 – J. Hall (T. Groat, T. Opilka) | 15–1 |
| 53:11 – J. Simmonds (R. Urso) (PP) | 16–1 |
| 55:22 – J. McGing (N. Zern) (PP) | 17–1 |

8 min
Penalties
20 min
87
Shots
9

| February 5, 2017; 12:30 | South Korea | 1–3 (0–1, 0–1, 1–1) | Great Britain | Halyk Arena, Almaty; Attendance: 2548 |

Game reference

Lee Han-back
Goalies
Adam Long
Referee:
Christian Persson (SWE)
Arkadiy Subbotin (KAZ)
Linesmen:
Tomas Regec (SVK)
Patrick Richardson (USA)

| | 0–1 | 5:07 – L. Charnock (S. Mogg) (PP) |
| | 0–2 | 26:09 – D. Rose (I. Antonov) |
| 41:57 – Kim D-h. (Son T-k.) | 1–2 |
| | 1–3 | 59:51 – I. Antonov (EN) |

8 min
Penalties
8 min
39
Shots
17

==== 11th place match ====
| February 6, 2017; 09:00 | South Korea | 7–2 (3–0, 2–1, 2–1) | China | Halyk Arena, Almaty; Attendance: 2312 |

Game reference

Lee Chang-hun
Goalies
Wu Jiankun
Zhou Tongzhe
Referee:
Christoffe Holm (SWE)
Lucas Martin (USA)
Linesmen:
Patrick Richardson (USA)
Nikita Viliugin (RUS)

| 0:37 – Kim D-h. (Hwang D-h.) | 1–0 |
| 4:11 – Hwang D-h. (Jung J-h., Son T-k.) | 2–0 |
| 7:26 – Choi Y-i. | 3–0 |
| | 3–1 | 22:38 – Zhang P. (PP) |
| 27:50 – Choi Y-i. (Kim Y-h., Song H-c.) | 4–1 |
| 38:45 – Song H-c. (Choi Y-i.) | 5–1 |
| 41:17 – Kim S-w. (Mun J-y.) | 6–1 |
| 44:28 – Kim Y-h. (SH) | 7–1 |
| | 7–2 | 58:41 – Bao J. (Yu M., Ji P.) (PP) |

16 min
Penalties
54 min
45
Shots
16

==== 9th place match ====
| February 6, 2017; 12:30 | United States | 10–1 (1–0, 6–0, 3–1) | Great Britain | Halyk Arena, Almaty; Attendance: 2603 |

Game reference

Jordan Gluck
Goalies
Adam Long
Thomas Hovell
Referee:
Christian Persson (SWE)
Vladimir Snasel (SVK)
Linesmen:
Vladimir Yefremov (KAZ)
Michal Zika (CZE)

| 15:46 – J. Breslin (N. Zern, R. Urso) | 1–0 |
| 23:05 – S. Murphy (J. McGing) | 2–0 |
| 29:12 – S. Murphy | 3–0 |
| 33:03 – A. Uglem (M. Cummings, T. Opilka) | 4–0 |
| 33:58 – J. Uglem (J. Hall) | 5–0 |
| 37:01 – J. Breslin (T. Herndon) | 6–0 |
| 39:22 – S. Murphy (J. McGing) | 7–0 |
| 40:30 – J. Simmonds (N. Zern, R. Urso) | 8–0 |
| | 8–1 | 40:51 – L. Branin |
| 43:44 – N. Zern (R. Urso, J. Simmonds) | 9–1 |
| 50:02 – M. Anders (T. Herndon) (PP) | 10–1 |

6 min
Penalties
10 min
68
Shots
7

=== Playoff round ===
Quarterfinals
1 | Kazakhstan | 4
8 | Sweden | 0
4 | Czech Republic | 4*
5 | Slovakia | 3
2 | Russia | 9
7 | Japan | 2
3 | Canada | 5
6 | Latvia | 2

Semifinals
1 | Kazakhstan | 4
4 | Czech Republic | 1
2 | Russia | 4
3 | Canada | 1

Gold Medal
1 | Kazakhstan | 0
2 | Russia | 1
Bronze Medal
3 | Canada | 4
4 | Czech Republic | 3

* denotes shootout victory

All times are local (UTC+6).

==== Quarterfinals ====
| February 4, 2017; 16:00 | Russia | 9–2 (1–0, 3–2, 5–0) | Japan | Halyk Arena, Almaty; Attendance: 2764 |

Game reference

Ilia Andriukhov
Goalies
Shotaro Kaneko
Referee:
Vladimir Snasel (SVK)
Arkadiy Subbotin (KAZ)
Linesmen:
Tomas Regec (SVK)
Michal Zika (CZE)

| 19:14 – A. Erofeev (V. Efremov, K. Pilipenko) | 1–0 |
| 24:52 – A. Erofeev (R. Tatalin, V. Efremov) (PP) | 2–0 |
| | 2–1 | 30:00 – H. Matsui (K. Deguchi, R. Katsuragawa) (PP) |
| | 2–2 | 32:26 – T. Shibata (PS) |
| 34:05 – S. Zabornikov (D. Kirillov, A. Alekseev) (PP) | 3–2 |
| 34:30 – R. Kudinov (D. Ilyin, N. Sirotkin) | 4–2 |
| 45:30 – S. Zabornikov (D. Kirillov, A. Alekseev) (PP) | 5–2 |
| 52:33 – D. Kirillov (K. Pilipenko, S. Zabornikov) | 6–2 |
| 53:11 – A. Osipov (D. Kirillov, A. Alekseev) | 7–2 |
| 57:05 – K. Pilipenko (V. Efremov) (PP) | 8–2 |
| 58:22 – I. Ivanov (D. Ilyin, N. Sirotkin) | 9–2 |

30 min
Penalties
20 min
61
Shots
13

| February 4, 2017; 19:30 | Canada | 5–2 (2–0, 1–2, 2–0) | Latvia | Halyk Arena, Almaty; Attendance: 2867 |

Game reference

Kevin Bailie
Goalies
Ints Bikars
Referee:
Christian Persson (SWE)
Alexey Roshchyn (ESP)
Linesmen:
Patrick Richardson (USA)
Vladimir Yefremov (KAZ)

| 7:29 – P. Morin (A. Basso, T. Giroux) | 1–0 |
| 18:29 – C. Durocher (S. Simmonds, A. Basso) | 2–0 |
| | 2–1 | 30:12 – O. Sislannikovs (M. Dilevka) |
| | 2–2 | 38:52 – O. Aploks (O. Sislannikovs) |
| 39:51 – M. McNamee | 3–2 |
| 49:59 – S. Doggett (S. Abraham, G. Asselin) (PP) | 4–2 |
| 57:13 – M. McNamee (C. Beaudoin, M. Lefebvre) | 5–2 |

14 min
Penalties
10 min
38
Shots
23

| February 5, 2017; 16:00 | Czech Republic | 4–3 SO (2–0, 0–1, 1–2) (OT: 0–0) (SO: 1–0) | Slovakia | Halyk Arena, Almaty; Attendance: 2794 |

Game reference

Jaroslav Brazdil
Goalies
Peter Putec
Referee:
Christoffe Holm (SWE)
Lucas Martin (USA)
Linesmen:
David Laksola (SWE)
Nikita Viliugin (RUS)

| 4:05 – D. Novak (F. Matula, P. Hucko) | 1–0 |
| 4:37 – J. Muller (D. Ballner) | 2–0 |
| | 2–1 | 27:37 – J. Zlocha (N. Ketner, M. Uhnak) |
| | 2–2 | 42:14 – P. Gapa (T. Hluch, J. Loydl) |
| 51:41 – D. Zachar | 3–2 |
| | 3–3 | 52:22 – T. Hluch (J. Tomcak, P. Gapa) |

T. Stastny
D. Kafka
D. Zachar
J. Muller (miss)
Shootout
M. Uhnak
P. Gapa
(miss) E. Piacka
(miss) I. Jakubik
(miss) J. Zlocha
8 min
Penalties
14 min
44
Shots
35

| February 5, 2017; 19:30 | Kazakhstan | 4–0 (1–0, 0–0, 3–0) | Sweden | Halyk Arena, Almaty; Attendance: 2763 |

Game reference

Pavel Poluektov
Goalies
Daniel Hansen
Referee:
Patrick Fichtner (AUT)
Michael Tscherrig (SUI)
Linesmen:
Choi Sukbae (KOR)
Mike Harrington (CAN)

| 10:15 – K. Savenkov (A. Burdelev) | 1–0 |
| 42:14 – K. Savitskiy (I. Stepanenko, D. Grents) (PP) | 2–0 |
| 47:51 – N. Mikhailis (K. Savitskiy, D. Grents) (PP) | 3–0 |
| 57:12 – A. Antsiferov (A. Assetov) | 4–0 |

10 min
Penalties
10 min
42
Shots
8

==== 5th–8th placement matches ====
| February 6, 2017; 16:00 | Slovakia | 4–2 (1–0, 3–0, 0–2) | Sweden | Halyk Arena, Almaty; Attendance: 2621 |

Game reference

Samuel Kosut
Goalies
Joakim Moritz
Referee:
Patrick Fichtner (AUT)
Stefan Hogarth (GBR)
Linesmen:
Choi Sukbae (KOR)
Mike Harrington (CAN)

| 15:08 – M. Indrych (A. Sucharda) | 1–0 |
| 34:40 – J. Tomcak (T. Hluch) | 2–0 |
| 35:40 – A. Sucharda (M. Indrych, M. Pichnarcik) | 3–0 |
| 39:29 – A. Sucharda (R. Gabor) | 4–0 |
| | 4–1 | 46:12 – M. Ortevall (V. Hjartquist, O. Eriksson) (PP) |
| | 4–2 | 50:30 – G. Werneman (V. Hjartquist, O. Eriksson) (PP) |

14 min
Penalties
4 min
35
Shots
35

| February 6, 2017; 19:30 | Latvia | 7–3 (3–0, 3–1, 1–2) | Japan | Halyk Arena, Almaty; Attendance: 2253 |

Game reference

Reinis Petkus
Goalies
Shun Furukawa
Shotaro Kaneko
Referee:
Alexey Roshchyn (ESP)
Michael Tscherrig (SUI)
Linesmen:
David Laksola (SWE)
Christopher Wells (GBR)

| 1:21 – V. Freijs (A. Ogorodnikovs) | 1–0 |
| 3:49 – V. Freijs (V. Minajevs) (PP) | 2–0 |
| 14:57 – J. Ziemins (S. Grinbergs) | 3–0 |
| 21:12 – Maris Dilevka (V. Minajevs, O. Sislannikovs) | 4–0 |
| 25:53 – V. Freijs (V. Minajevs) | 5–0 |
| | 5–1 | 30:58 – K. Kawamura (K. Matsumoto) (SH) |
| 37:42 – R. Nekludovs (Maris Dilevka, I. Makarovs) | 6–1 |
| | 6–2 | 40:43 – K. Matsumoto (K. Abe, K. Kawamura) |
| 47:48 – E. Jansons (O. Sislannikovs) | 7–2 |
| | 7–3 | 57:08 – R. Katsuragawa (H. Matsui, J. Inui) (PP) |

14 min
Penalties
16 min
35
Shots
25

==== 7th place match ====
| February 7, 2017; 09:00 | Japan | 4–5 (1–3, 2–1, 1–1) | Sweden | Halyk Arena, Almaty; Attendance: 2573 |

Game reference

Shotaro Kaneko
Goalies
Daniel Hansen
Referee:
Patrick Fichtner (AUT)
Arkadiy Subbotin (KAZ)
Linesmen:
Vladimir Yefremov (KAZ)
Michal Zika (CZE)

| | 0–1 | 6:49 – J. Fransson (D. Ostlin, M. Ortevall) |
| | 0–2 | 7:00 – M. Emanuelsson (J. Fransson, L. Lundberg) |
| 7:11 – K. Deguchi (S. Hitosato, S. Furukawa) | 1–2 |
| | 1–3 | 7:22 – J. Saldeen (D. Pettersson) |
| | 1–4 | 20:58 – D. Pettersson (O. Eriksson, O. Dahlbom) |
| 25:25 – K. Matsukane (S. Hitosato, S. Furukawa) | 2–4 |
| 35:24 – T. Shibata (T. Koizumi) (SH) | 3–4 |
| 47:12 – S. Hitosato (K. Deguchi) | 4–4 |
| | 4–5 | 53:21 – D. Pettersson (H. Gronlund) (PP) |

10 min
Penalties
4 min
33
Shots
20

==== 5th place match ====
| February 7, 2017; 12:30 | Slovakia | 5–4 (1–2, 2–1, 2–1) | Latvia | Halyk Arena, Almaty; Attendance: 2593 |

Game reference

Peter Putec
Samuel Kosut
Goalies
Ints Bikars
Reinis Petkus
Referee:
Stefan Hogarth (GBR)
Christian Persson (SWE)
Linesmen:
Nikita Viliugin (RUS)
Christopher Wells (GBR)

| | 0–1 | 4:10 – V. Freijs |
| | 0–2 | 7:55 – K. Millers (J. Ziemins, S. Grinbergs) |
| 19:03 – T. Hluch (J. Tomcak, P. Gapa) | 1–2 |
| | 1–3 | 24:46 – O. Sislannikovs (I. Makarovs) (PP) |
| 38:10 – E. Piacka (M. Pichnarcik, M. Uhnak) (PP) | 2–3 |
| 38:46 – A. Sucharda (M. Indrych) (PP) | 3–3 |
| 48:54 – P. Bustin (P. Gapa, I. Jakubic) | 4–3 |
| 50:15 – E. Piacka (M. Uhnak, R. Gabor) | 5–3 |
| | 5–4 | 54:03 – K. Millers (O. Sislannikovs, S. Grinbergs) |

16 min
Penalties
14 min
28
Shots
29

==== Semifinals ====
| February 7, 2017; 16:00 | Russia | 4–1 (1–0, 1–0, 2–1) | Canada | Halyk Arena, Almaty; Attendance: 2597 |

Game reference

Ilia Andriukhov
Goalies
Kevin Bailie
Referee:
Christoffe Holm (SWE)
Lucas Martin (USA)
Linesmen:
Tomas Regec (SVK)
Patrick Richardson (USA)

| 4:18 – S. Zabornikov (A. Tarasov, D. Kirillov) (PP) | 1–0 |
| 26:12 – A. Osipov (A. Alekseev, S. Zabornikov) | 2–0 |
| 54:30 – A. Erofeev (D. Kirillov, V. Efremov) (PP) | 3–0 |
| 58:33 – I. Ivanov (N. Sirotkin, D. Ilyin) (EN) | 4–0 |
| | 4–1 | 59:45 – G. Asselin (A. Basso) |

16 min
Penalties
20 min
34
Shots
16

| February 7, 2017; 19:30 | Kazakhstan | 4–1 (1–1, 2–0, 1–0) | Czech Republic | Halyk Arena, Almaty; Attendance: 2625 |

Game reference

Sergey Kudryavtsev
Goalies
Josef Novak
Referee:
Alexey Roshchyn (ESP)
Vladimir Snasel (SVK)
Linesmen:
Mike Harrington (CAN)
David Laksola (SWE)

| | 0–1 | 16:14 – D. Arnost (T. Stastny, D. Kafka) |
| 17:40 – K. Savenkov (A. Pissarev) | 1–1 |
| 30:59 – D. Grents (N. Mikhailis, M. Ibraibekov) | 2–1 |
| 31:43 – P. Akolzin (K. Savenkov) | 3–1 |
| 42:40 – A. Antsiferov (A. Assetov, A. Sagadeyev) | 4–1 |

6 min
Penalties
14 min
30
Shots
20

==== Bronze medal match ====
| February 8, 2017; 11:00 | Canada | 4–3 (3–1, 1–2, 0–0) | Czech Republic | Halyk Arena, Almaty; Attendance: 2850 |

Game reference

Kevin Bailie
Sebastien Auger
Goalies
Jaroslav Brazdil
Referee:
Christoffe Holm (SWE)
Vladimir Snasel (SVK)
Linesmen:
Patrick Richardson (USA)
Nikita Viliugin (RUS)

| 1:17 – T. Giroux (P. Morin) | 1–0 |
| 3:28 – P. Morin (M. McNamee, M. Lefebvre) (PP) | 2–0 |
| | 2–1 | 8:33 – D. Kafka (M. Gutwald, T. Stastny) |
| 9:14 – B. Welychka (M. McNamee, R. Van Stralen) | 3–1 |
| | 3–2 | 22:43 – D. Ballner (F. Svaricek) |
| 23:41 – T. Giroux (G. Asselin, P. Morin) | 4–2 |
| | 4–3 | 28:52 – D. Zachar (M. Bail) |

6 min
Penalties
10 min
30
Shots
34

==== Gold medal match ====
| February 8, 2017; 15:00 | Kazakhstan | 0–1 (0–0, 0–0, 0–1) | Russia | Halyk Arena, Almaty; Attendance: 3233 |

Game reference
| Sergey Kudryavtsev | Goalies | Ilia Andriukhov | Referee: Lucas Wilcox (USA); Michael Tscherrig (SUI); Linesmen: Mike Harrington (CAN); David Laksola (SWE) |
| 0–1 / 41:32 – D. Ilyin (N. Sirotkin, V. Repin) | | | Referee: Lucas Wilcox (USA); Michael Tscherrig (SUI); Linesmen: Mike Harrington (CAN); David Laksola (SWE) |
| 8 min | Penalties | 14 min | Referee: Lucas Wilcox (USA); Michael Tscherrig (SUI); Linesmen: Mike Harrington (CAN); David Laksola (SWE) |
| 21 | Shots | 35 | Referee: Lucas Wilcox (USA); Michael Tscherrig (SUI); Linesmen: Mike Harrington (CAN); David Laksola (SWE) |

=== Final standings ===
| 1st place, gold medalist(s) | Russia |
| 2nd place, silver medalist(s) | Kazakhstan |
| 3rd place, bronze medalist(s) | Canada |
| 4 | Czech Republic |
| 5 | Slovakia |
| 6 | Latvia |
| 7 | Sweden |
| 8 | Japan |
| 9 | United States |
| 10 | (United Kingdom) Great Britain |
| 11 | South Korea |
| 12 | China |

=== Scoring leaders ===
List shows the top skaters sorted by points, then goals.

| Player | GP | G | A | Pts | +/− | PIM | POS |
|---|---|---|---|---|---|---|---|
| (Russia) Andrei Alekseev | 6 | 5 | 8 | 13 | +11 | 6 | F |
| (Kazakhstan) Konstantin Savenkov | 6 | 6 | 6 | 12 | +13 | 0 | F |
| (Russia) Dmitrii Kirillov | 6 | 4 | 8 | 12 | +9 | 4 | F |
| (Kazakhstan) Kirill Savitskiy | 6 | 5 | 6 | 11 | +5 | 2 | F |
| (Latvia) Olegs Sislannikovs | 6 | 4 | 7 | 11 | +5 | 4 | F |
| (Russia) Stanislav Zabornikov | 6 | 4 | 7 | 11 | +10 | 12 | D |
| (Canada) Michael McNamee | 6 | 3 | 8 | 11 | +9 | 0 | F |
| (Kazakhstan) Dmitriy Grents | 6 | 5 | 5 | 10 | +4 | 4 | F |
| (Sweden) Daniel Pettersson | 6 | 5 | 5 | 10 | +6 | 2 | F |
| (Canada) Pierre-Olivier Morin | 6 | 6 | 3 | 9 | +2 | 16 | F |
| (United States) James McGing | 5 | 4 | 5 | 9 | +6 | 2 | D |
| (Russia) Nikita Sirotkin | 6 | 4 | 5 | 9 | +11 | 4 | F |
| (Russia) Vladislav Efremov | 6 | 1 | 8 | 9 | +9 | 2 | F |

GP = Games played; G = Goals; A = Assists; Pts = Points; +/− = Plus/minus; PIM = Penalties in minutes; POS = Position
Source: almaty2017.com

=== Leading goaltenders ===
Only the top six goaltenders, based on save percentage, who have played at least 40% of their team's minutes, are included in this list.

| Player | TOI | GA | GAA | SA | Sv% | SO |
|---|---|---|---|---|---|---|
| (Kazakhstan) Sergey Kudryavtsev | 218:34 | 2 | 0.55 | 83 | 97.59 | 1 |
| (Russia) Ilia Andriukhov | 340:00 | 4 | 0.71 | 90 | 95.56 | 2 |
| (Slovakia) Samuel Kosut | 175:14 | 8 | 2.74 | 93 | 91.40 | 0 |
| (Slovakia) Peter Putec | 154:46 | 8 | 3.10 | 86 | 90.70 | 0 |
| (Canada) Kevin Bailie | 268:26 | 11 | 2.46 | 117 | 90.60 | 1 |
| (Sweden) Daniel Hansen | 180:00 | 13 | 4.33 | 130 | 90.00 | 0 |

TOI = Time on ice (minutes:seconds); SA = Shots against; GA = Goals against; GAA = Goals against average; Sv% = Save percentage; SO = Shutouts
Source: almaty2017.com

== Women ==
2017 Winter Universiade women's tournament
Tournament details
- Venue: 1 (in 1 host city)
- Dates: January 28 – February 6
- Teams: 7

Final positions
- Champions: Russia (2nd title)
- Runners-up: Canada
- Third place: United States
- Fourth place: China

Tournament statistics
- Games played: 16
- Goals scored: 136 (8.5 per game)
- Attendance: 33,471 (2,092 per game)
- Scoring leader: (Canada) Alexandra Labelle (13 points)

Official website
- FISU.net

=== Preliminary round ===
Seven participating teams were placed in the following two groups. After playing a round-robin, the teams ranked first and second in each group advanced to the semifinals.

Teams received 3 points for a regulation win, 2 points for an overtime/shootout win and 1 point for an overtime/shootout loss.

All game box scores via wuni2017.sportresult.com.

==== Group A ====
| Team | Pld | W | OTW | OTL | L | GF | GA | GD | Pts | Qualification |
|---|---|---|---|---|---|---|---|---|---|---|
| Canada | 3 | 3 | 0 | 0 | 0 | 34 | 1 | +33 | 9 | Advanced to semifinals |
| China | 3 | 2 | 0 | 0 | 1 | 17 | 10 | +7 | 6 | Advanced to semifinals |
| Kazakhstan | 3 | 1 | 0 | 0 | 2 | 12 | 15 | −3 | 3 | 5th–7th placement round |
| Great Britain | 3 | 0 | 0 | 0 | 3 | 0 | 37 | −37 | 0 | 5th–7th placement round |

All times are local (UTC+6).

| January 28, 2017; 16:30 | Canada | 9–1 (3–0, 4–1, 2–0) | China | Baluan Sholak Sports Palace, Almaty; Attendance: 1504 |

Game reference

Valerie Lamenta
Goalies
He Siye
Wang Yuqing
Referee:
Terese Bergecliff (SWE)
Olga Steinberg (RUS)
Linesmen:
Lorna Beresford (GBR)
Oksana Shestakova (KAZ)

| 3:42 – K. Bailey (M. Bouchard, D. Oddy) | 1–0 |
| 6:08 – M. Bouchard (K. Willoughby, A. Sharman) | 2–0 |
| 8:33 – A. Sharman (M. Bouchard, K. Willoughby) | 3–0 |
| 23:02 – J. Magwood (K. Gavelin, K. Gosling) | 4–0 |
| 24:38 – A. Labelle (J. Cormier) | 5–0 |
| 31:51 – M. Bouchard (K. Willoughby) | 6–0 |
| | 6–1 | 33:21 – Fang X. |
| 39:25 – K. Gribbons (K. Apperson, D. Oddy) (PP) | 7–1 |
| 50:48 – R. Marriott (K. Apperson, B. Iazzolino) | 8–1 |
| 57:57 – D. Oddy (M. Laramee, J. Magwood) | 9–1 |

14 min
Penalties
8 min
55
Shots
5

| January 28, 2017; 20:00 | Kazakhstan | 11–0 (4–0, 4–0, 3–0) | Great Britain | Baluan Sholak Sports Palace, Almaty; Attendance: 2990 |

Game reference

Referee:
Kelly Cooke (USA)
Maria Råbye Fuchsel (DEN)
Linesmen:
Fu Yue (CHN)
Kristin Moore (USA)

| 1:46 – K. Felzink (G. Nurgaliyeva) | 1–0 |
| 6:20 – M. Aldabergenova (M. Ryspek) (PP) | 2–0 |
| 12:36 – A. Khamimuldinova (M. Ryspek) (PP) | 3–0 |
| 18:01 – G. Nurgaliyeva (E. Ramazanova) | 4–0 |
| 22:54 – B. Kartanbayeva (A. Shegebayeva, A. Olzhabayeva) | 5–0 |
| 29:50 – M. Ryspek (M. Aldabergenova, A. Orlova) (PP) | 6–0 |
| 32:58 – P. Ashimova (A. Feklistova, A. Khamimuldinova) (PP) | 7–0 |
| 34:39 – A. Orlova (M. Ryspek, A. Olzhabayeva) (PP) | 8–0 |
| 48:05 – A. Shegebayeva (G. Nurgaliyeva) (SH) | 9–0 |
| 53:34 – K. Felzink (A. Olzhabayeva) | 10–0 |
| 58:23 – B. Kartanbayeva (A. Orlova) (SH) | 11–0 |

10 min
Penalties
45 min
63
Shots
11

| January 30, 2017; 16:30 | Canada | 14–0 (8–0, 5–0, 1–0) | Great Britain | Baluan Sholak Sports Palace, Almaty; Attendance: 462 |

Game reference

Stephanie Sluys
Goalies
Samantha Bolwell
Holly Steeples
Referee:
Terese Bergecliff (SWE)
Maria Råbye Fuchsel (DEN)
Linesmen:
Fu Yue (CHN)
Oksana Shestakova (KAZ)

| 3:54 – K. Bailey | 1–0 |
| 4:41 – A. Larson (K. Murray) | 2–0 |
| 7:50 – A. Labelle | 3–0 |
| 12:46 – M. Laramee (K. Gribbons, E. Rieder) (PP) | 4–0 |
| 14:07 – M. Bouchard (A. Sharman, K. Willoughby) | 5–0 |
| 16:09 – A. Poznikoff (M. Laramee, J. Magwood) | 6–0 |
| 18:42 – J. Cormier (C. DuBois, A. Larson) | 7–0 |
| 19:31 – M. Laramee (A. Poznikoff) | 8–0 |
| 27:06 – J. Magwood (K. Gavelin, M. Laramee) (PP) | 9–0 |
| 28:22 – M. Bouchard (A. Sharman, K. Murray) | 10–0 |
| 31:18 – M. Bouchard (K. Willoughby, A. Sharman) | 11–0 |
| 32:48 – B. Iazzolino (A. Labelle) (PP) | 12–0 |
| 39:08 – J. Cormier (A. Labelle, M. Laramee) | 13–0 |
| 50:35 – A. Labelle (A. Larson, B. Iazzolino) (PP) | 14–0 |

6 min
Penalties
18 min
77
Shots
0

| January 30, 2017; 20:00 | China | 4–1 (1–0, 2–1, 1–0) | Kazakhstan | Baluan Sholak Sports Palace, Almaty; Attendance: 3027 |

Game reference

He Siye
Goalies
Darya Dmitriyeva
Referee:
Kelly Cooke (USA)
Michelle Stapleton (CAN)
Linesmen:
Lorna Beresford (GBR)
Kristin Moore (USA)

| 19:49 – Di D. (Zhao Q., Kong M.) (PP) | 1–0 |
| 21:41 – Zhang M. | 2–0 |
| | 2–1 | 25:07 – M. Aldabergenova (PP) |
| 35:54 – He X. (Fang X.) (PP) | 3–1 |
| 47:14 – Fang X. (Kong M., He X.) | 4–1 |

4 min
Penalties
14 min
40
Shots
22

| February 1, 2017; 16:30 | Great Britain | 0–12 (0–5, 0–3, 0–4) | China | Baluan Sholak Sports Palace, Almaty; Attendance: 489 |

Game reference

Holly Steeples
Samantha Bolwell
Goalies
Jiang Yue
Referee:
Kelly Cooke (USA)
Michelle Stapleton (CAN)
Linesmen:
Kristin Moore (USA)
Oksana Shestakova (KAZ)

| 0–1 | 4:47 – Lyu Y. |
| 0–2 | 11:02 – Ju J. (Guan Y., Lyu Y.) |
| 0–3 | 14:49 – Zhang M. (Kong M., Tian N.) |
| 0–4 | 16:33 – Zhao Q. (Liu S.) |
| 0–5 | 17:55 – Fang X. (Zhao Q., Kong M.) (PP) |
| 0–6 | 20:12 – He X. (Wen L.) |
| 0–7 | 25:28 – Zhang M. (Zhao Q., Fang X.) (PP) |
| 0–8 | 31:39 – Fang X. (SH) |
| 0–9 | 44:23 – Jiang B. (Guan Y.) (PP) |
| 0–10 | 49:19 – He X. (Du J., Guan Y.) |
| 0–11 | 50:48 – Lyu Y. (Tian N., )Guan Y. |
| 0–12 | 59:59 – Zhang M. (Fang X., Zhao Q.) |

18 min
Penalties
6 min
7
Shots
65

| February 1, 2017; 20:00 | Kazakhstan | 0–11 (0–3, 0–3, 0–5) | Canada | Baluan Sholak Sports Palace, Almaty; Attendance: 2920 |

Game reference

Darya Dmitriyeva
Goalies
Stephanie Sluys
Referee:
Maria Råbye Fuchsel (DEN)
Olga Steinberg (RUS)
Linesmen:
Fu Yue (CHN)
Greta Johansson (SWE)

| 0–1 | 11:11 – J. Magwood (K. Bailey, A. Sharman) (PP) |
| 0–2 | 14:17 – B. Iazzolino (C. DuBois) |
| 0–3 | 17:39 – C. DuBois (B. Iazzolino, K. Apperson) |
| 0–4 | 30:48 – D. Oddy (B. Iazzolino, J. Cormier) |
| 0–5 | 35:20 – K. Apperson (K. Gavelin) |
| 0–6 | 38:33 – A. Labelle (D. Oddy) |
| 0–7 | 41:50 – A. Labelle (K. Bailey, K. Murray) |
| 0–8 | 52:07 – K. Gosling (A. Labelle, K. Bailey) |
| 0–9 | 52:26 – A. Labelle (K. Gosling, K. Murray) |
| 0–10 | 54:11 – K. Apperson (C. DuBois, M. Laramee) |
| 0–11 | 57:40 – J. Magwood (C. DuBois, K. Gosling) |

10 min
Penalties
4 min
16
Shots
72

==== Group B ====
| Team | Pld | W | OTW | OTL | L | GF | GA | GD | Pts | Qualification |
|---|---|---|---|---|---|---|---|---|---|---|
| Russia | 2 | 2 | 0 | 0 | 0 | 17 | 2 | +15 | 6 | Advanced to semifinals |
| United States | 2 | 1 | 0 | 0 | 1 | 4 | 9 | −5 | 3 | Advanced to semifinals |
| Japan | 2 | 0 | 0 | 0 | 2 | 3 | 13 | −10 | 0 | 5th–7th placement round |

All times are local (UTC+6).

| January 29, 2017; 12:30 | United States | 1–7 (0–3, 1–3, 0–1) | Russia | Baluan Sholak Sports Palace, Almaty; Attendance: 3025 |

Game reference

Amber Greene
Goalies
Maria Sorokina
Referee:
Anniina Nurmi (FIN)
Michelle Stapleton (CAN)
Linesmen:
Jennifer Guenette (CAN)
Greta Johansson (SWE)

| | 0–1 | 2:53 – A. Shokhina (Y. Dergachyova) (PP) |
| | 0–2 | 4:48 – F. Kadirova (Y. Dyupina, L. Malyavko) |
| | 0–3 | 10:30 – F. Kadirova (L. Maliavko, Y. Lobova) |
| | 0–4 | 22:04 – A. Shokhina (A. Goncharenko) (PP) |
| 22:46 – K. Ash (B. Lanzilli, K. Augustine) | 1–4 |
| | 1–5 | 29:07 – O. Sosina (L. Belyakova, A. Vafina) |
| | 1–6 | 34:50 – A. Vafina (O. Sosina, M. Batalova) (PP) |
| | 1–7 | 45:17 – Y. Dyupina (F. Kadirova, A. Shibanova) |

18 min
Penalties
10 min
9
Shots
65

| January 31, 2017; 20:00 | Japan | 2–3 (0–1, 1–2, 1–0) | United States | Baluan Sholak Sports Palace, Almaty; Attendance: 1219 |

Game reference

Amika Yoshida
Goalies
Amber Greene
Referee:
Anniina Nurmi (FIN)
Olga Steinberg (RUS)
Linesmen:
Greta Johansson (SWE)
Jennifer Guenette (CAN)

| | 0–1 | 15:28 – L. MacArthur (N. Matthews, R. Booth) |
| | 0–2 | 27:00 – K. Myers (A. Brown) |
| 27:38 – A. Ota (Y. Kawashima) | 1–2 |
| | 1–3 | 32:55 – K. Myers (S. Camp) |
| 48:16 – S. Taka (A. Sonoda) (PP) | 2–3 |

12 min
Penalties
18 min
34
Shots
27

| February 2, 2017; 20:00 | Russia | 10–1 (5–0, 2–1, 3–0) | Japan | Baluan Sholak Sports Palace, Almaty; Attendance: 1879 |

Game reference

Nadezhda Morozova
Goalies
Amika Yoshida
Referee:
Terese Bergecliff (SWE)
Anniina Nurmi (FIN)
Linesmen:
Lorna Beresford (GBR)
Jennifer Guenette (CAN)

| 3:52 – O. Sosina (A. Shibanova, L. Belyakova) | 1–0 |
| 9:24 – O. Sosina (L. Belyakova, A. Shibanova) | 2–0 |
| 11:29 – A. Shibanova (L. Belyakova) | 3–0 |
| 15:09 – Y. Dergachyova (A. Goncharenko) (PP) | 4–0 |
| 16:54 – Y. Dyupina (F. Kadirova) | 5–0 |
| 21:02 – A. Shibanova (A. Shtaryova) | 6–0 |
| | 6–1 | 31:02 – M. Sakamoto (N. Hattori, S. Taka) (PP) |
| 36:39 – O. Sosina (A. Vafina, A. Shibanova) (PP) | 7–1 |
| 53:33 – A. Shtaryova (A. Shokhina, Y. Dergachyova) (PP) | 8–1 |
| 57:32 – Y. Dergachyova (A. Shtaryova, A. Shokhina) (PP) | 9–1 |
| 59:44 – A. Shibanova (A. Shokhina, M. Batalova) | 10–1 |

16 min
Penalties
20 min
66
Shots
10

=== 5th–7th placement round ===
| Team | Pld | W | OTW | OTL | L | GF | GA | GD | Pts |
|---|---|---|---|---|---|---|---|---|---|
| Japan | 2 | 2 | 0 | 0 | 0 | 13 | 2 | +11 | 6 |
| Kazakhstan | 2 | 1 | 0 | 0 | 1 | 6 | 4 | +2 | 3 |
| Great Britain | 2 | 0 | 0 | 0 | 2 | 2 | 15 | −13 | 0 |

All times are local (UTC+6).

| February 3, 2017; 20:00 | Japan | 4–0 (0–0, 2–0, 2–0) | Kazakhstan | Baluan Sholak Sports Palace, Almaty; Attendance: 2783 |

Game reference

Amika Yoshida
Mifuyu Sakashita
Goalies
Darya Dmitriyeva
Referee:
Kelly Cooke (USA)
Olga Steinberg (RUS)
Linesmen:
Jennifer Guenette (CAN)
Kristin Moore (USA)

| 28:06 – Y. Ota (M. Sakamoto) | 1–0 |
| 34:43 – N. Sugisawa (A. Ota, Y. Ota) | 2–0 |
| 45:58 – Y. Ota (Y. Kawashima, A. Ota) (PP) | 3–0 |
| 56:59 – A. Ota (Y. Ota, N. Sugisawa) | 4–0 |

8 min
Penalties
8 min
37
Shots
17

| February 5, 2017; 13:00 | Great Britain | 2–9 (0–4, 0–2, 2–3) | Japan | Baluan Sholak Sports Palace, Almaty; Attendance: 1741 |

Game reference

Holly Steeples
Goalies
Mifuyu Sakashita
Referee:
Anniina Nurmi (FIN)
Olga Steinberg (RUS)
Linesmen:
Greta Johansson (SWE)
Oksana Shestakova (KAZ)

| | 0–1 | 3:19 – Y. Kawashima (N. Sugisawa) (PP) |
| | 0–2 | 3:41 – C. Miyazaki (S. Taka, M. Sakamoto) |
| | 0–3 | 9:23 – M. Sakamoto (S. Taka, C. Miyazaki) |
| | 0–4 | 17:33 – C. Miyazaki (M. Sakamoto, N. Hattori) |
| | 0–5 | 22:40 – M. Ushikubo (M. Mizuno) |
| | 0–6 | 32:59 – Y. Ota (N. Sugisawa) (SH) |
| 40:08 – J. Browne (S. Allen) (PP) | 1–6 |
| 40:27 – E. Milne (L. Lickman, L. Kendall) | 2–6 |
| | 2–7 | 53:04 – S. Taka (C. Miyazaki, M. Sakamoto) |
| | 2–8 | 55:29 – M. Sakamoto (S. Taka) (PP) |
| | 2–9 | 56:48 – M. Mizuno |

14 min
Penalties
10 min
8
Shots
78

| February 6, 2017; 13:00 | Kazakhstan | 6–0 (1–0, 3–0, 2–0) | Great Britain | Baluan Sholak Sports Palace, Almaty; Attendance: 811 |

Game reference

Darya Dmitriyeva
Goalies
Samantha Bolwell
Referee:
Terese Bergecliff (SWE)
Olga Steinberg (RUS)
Linesmen:
Fu Yue (CHN)
Jennifer Guenette (CAN)

| 15:42 – B. Kartanbayeva (M. Tursynova, A. Shegebayeva) | 1–0 |
| 24:47 – M. Aldabergenova (G. Nurgaliyeva) | 2–0 |
| 25:14 – A. Shegebayeva (M. Tursynova, T. Likhaus) | 3–0 |
| 35:43 – M. Ryspek (A. Orlova) | 4–0 |
| 43:30 – E. Ramazanova (L. Myngzhassarova) | 5–0 |
| 49:32 – B. Kartanbayeva (M. Aldabergenova, M. Ryspek) | 6–0 |

8 min
Penalties
4 min
49
Shots
12

=== Playoff round ===
Semifinals
1A | Canada | 8
2B | United States | 1
1B | Russia | 10
2A | China | 1

Gold Medal
1A | Canada | 1
1B | Russia | 4
Bronze Medal
2A | China | 0
2B | United States | 3

All times are local (UTC+6).

==== Semifinals ====
| February 4, 2017; 16:30 | Canada | 8–1 (3–0, 2–1, 3–0) | United States | Baluan Sholak Sports Palace, Almaty; Attendance: 2424 |

Game reference

Valerie Lamenta
Goalies
Lauren Allen
Referee:
Terese Bergecliff (SWE)
Maria Råbye Fuchsel (DEN)
Linesmen:
Lorna Beresford (GBR)
Fu Yue (CHN)

| 10:24 – J. Cormier (K. Gosling, Brianna Iazzolino) (PP) | 1–0 |
| 15:16 – R. Marriott (A. Poznikoff, K. Gavelin) | 2–0 |
| 16:10 – E. Rieder (D. Oddy, A. Labelle) | 3–0 |
| 29:25 – C. DuBois (K. Bailey, K. Apperson) (PP) | 4–0 |
| 30:14 – A. Labelle (K. Murray, A. Sharman) (PP) | 5–0 |
| | 5–1 | 36:40 – R. Senden (N. Matthews, K. Myers) (SH) |
| 43:26 – K. Willoughby (M. Bouchard) | 6–1 |
| 46:07 – A. Labelle (A. Sharman, D. Oddy) | 7–1 |
| 55:57 – A. Labelle (D. Oddy, J. Cormier) | 8–1 |

12 min
Penalties
18 min
58
Shots
12

| February 4, 2017; 20:00 | Russia | 10–1 (7–0, 3–1, 0–0) | China | Baluan Sholak Sports Palace, Almaty; Attendance: 1907 |

Game reference

Valeria Tarakanova
Goalies
He Siye
Wang Yuqing
Referee:
Anniina Nurmi (FIN)
Michelle Stapleton (CAN)
Linesmen:
Jennifer Guenette (CAN)
Kristin Moore (USA)

| 1:37 – M. Batalova (L. Belyakova) | 1–0 |
| 2:43 – A. Shtaryova (N. Pirogova, Y. Dergachyova) | 2–0 |
| 4:46 – Y. Dergachyova (A. Shokhina) (PP) | 3–0 |
| 5:14 – L. Malyavko (Y. Dyupina, Y. Lobova) | 4–0 |
| 7:14 – O. Sosina (M. Batalova, A. Shibanova) | 5–0 |
| 10:23 – A. Shtaryova (Y. Dergachyova) | 6–0 |
| 14:42 – N. Pirogova (A. Shokhina, Y. Dergachyova) | 7–0 |
| | 7–1 | 22:07 – Guan Y. (Ju J.) |
| 30:18 – F. Kadirova (M. Batalova, L. Belyakova) | 8–1 |
| 33:01 – A. Shokhina (Y. Dergachyova, M. Batalova) | 9–1 |
| 34:21 – F. Kadirova (Y. Lobova, L. Belyakova) | 10–1 |

6 min
Penalties
2 min
50
Shots
16

==== Bronze medal match ====
| February 6, 2017; 16:30 | China | 0–3 (0–0, 0–0, 0–3) | United States | Baluan Sholak Sports Palace, Almaty; Attendance: 1793 |

Game reference

He Siye
Goalies
Amber Greene
Referee:
Anniina Nurmi (FIN)
Michelle Stapleton (CAN)
Linesmen:
Lorna Beresford (GBR)
Oksana Shestakova (KAZ)

| 0–1 | 41:24 – K. Myers (N. Matthews, R. Booth) |
| 0–2 | 44:30 – L. MacArthur (J. Anderson, N. Matthews) |
| 0–3 | 48:19 – M. Wolsmann (A. Visalli) |

6 min
Penalties
8 min
28
Shots
36

==== Gold medal match ====
| February 6, 2017; 20:00 | Canada | 1–4 (0–2, 1–1, 0–1) | Russia | Baluan Sholak Sports Palace, Almaty; Attendance: 4497 |

Game reference

Valerie Lamenta
Goalies
Maria Sorokina
Referee:
Kelly Cooke (USA)
Maria Råbye Fuchsel (DEN)
Linesmen:
Greta Johansson (SWE)
Kristin Moore (USA)

| | 0–1 | 11:45 – O. Sosina (L. Belyakova) (PP) |
| | 0–2 | 18:23 – L. Belyakova (O. Sosina, E. Lobova) |
| 31:12 – K. Apperson (J. Magwood) | 1–2 |
| | 1–3 | 35:55 – O. Sosina |
| | 1–4 | 51:08 – A. Shtaryova (Y. Dergachyova, A. Shokhina) (PP) |

12 min
Penalties
40 min
26
Shots
36

=== Final standings ===
| 1st place, gold medalist(s) | Russia |
| 2nd place, silver medalist(s) | Canada |
| 3rd place, bronze medalist(s) | United States |
| 4 | China |
| 5 | Japan |
| 6 | Kazakhstan |
| 7 | (United Kingdom) Great Britain |

=== Scoring leaders ===
List shows the top skaters sorted by points, then goals.

| Player | GP | G | A | Pts | +/− | PIM | POS |
|---|---|---|---|---|---|---|---|
| (Canada) Alexandra Labelle | 5 | 9 | 4 | 13 | +12 | 0 | F |
| (Russia) Yelena Dergachyova | 4 | 3 | 7 | 10 | +5 | 4 | F |
| (Russia) Olga Sosina | 4 | 7 | 2 | 9 | +8 | 4 | F |
| (Russia) Anna Shokhina | 4 | 3 | 6 | 9 | +7 | 6 | F |
| (Russia) Liudmila Belyakova | 4 | 1 | 8 | 9 | +11 | 4 | F |
| (Canada) Melodie Bouchard | 5 | 5 | 3 | 8 | +6 | 0 | F |
| (Russia) Anna Shibanova | 4 | 3 | 5 | 8 | +13 | 18 | D |
| (Canada) Daley Oddy | 5 | 2 | 6 | 8 | +9 | 2 | F |
| (Canada) Alanna Sharman | 5 | 1 | 7 | 8 | +7 | 2 | F |
| (China) Fang Xin | 5 | 4 | 3 | 7 | 0 | 0 | F |
| (Canada) Jaycee Magwood | 5 | 4 | 3 | 7 | +10 | 2 | F |
| (Japan) Mayo Sakamoto | 4 | 3 | 4 | 7 | +2 | 4 | F |
| (Canada) Kelty Apperson | 5 | 3 | 4 | 7 | +5 | 2 | F |
| (Canada) Brianna Iazzolino | 5 | 2 | 5 | 7 | +9 | 8 | D |
| (Canada) Maude Laramee | 5 | 2 | 5 | 7 | +5 | 12 | D |

GP = Games played; G = Goals; A = Assists; Pts = Points; +/− = Plus/minus; PIM = Penalties in minutes; POS = Position
Source: almaty2017.com

=== Leading goaltenders ===
Only the top five goaltenders, based on save percentage, who have played at least 40% of their team's minutes, are included in this list.

| Player | TOI | GA | GAA | SA | Sv% | SO |
|---|---|---|---|---|---|---|
| (Canada) Stephanie Sluys | 120:00 | 0 | 0.00 | 16 | 100.00 | 2 |
| (Russia) Maria Sorokina | 125:56 | 2 | 0.95 | 38 | 94.74 | 0 |
| (United States) Amber Greene | 180:00 | 9 | 3.00 | 127 | 92.91 | 1 |
| (Kazakhstan) Darya Dmitriyeva | 294:31 | 19 | 3.87 | 172 | 88.95 | 1 |
| (Canada) Valerie Lamenta | 177:20 | 6 | 2.03 | 53 | 88.68 | 0 |

TOI = Time on ice (minutes:seconds); SA = Shots against; GA = Goals against; GAA = Goals against average; Sv% = Save percentage; SO = Shutouts
Source: almaty2017.com

== Medalists ==
| Event | Gold | Silver | Bronze |
|---|---|---|---|
| Men | Russia (RUS); 1 Alexander Samonov; 3 Andrei Shcherbov; 7 Yury Kozlovskiy; 13 Stanislav Zabornikov (A); 15 Ivan Ivanov (A); 19 Andrei Alekseev; 21 Mikhail Orlov; 24 Nikita Sirotkin; 26 Daniil Ilyin; 30 Timur Bilyalov; 31 Ilia Andriukhov; 44 Roman Kudinov; 45 Vladislav Efremov; 47 Dmitrii Kirillov (C); 52 Artem Osipov; 55 Vladimir Repin; 57 Andrei Erofeev; 63 Kirill Pilipenko; 73 Sergei Smurov; 77 Maksim Kudriashov; 87 Aleksandr Tarasov; 93 Vadim Shutov; 98 Roman Tatalin | Kazakhstan (KAZ); 1 Pavel Poluektov; 3 Georgiy Dulnev; 4 Madiyar Ibraibekov (A); 7 Vladimir Grebenshchikov; 8 Kirill Savitskiy; 9 Anton Sagadeyev; 10 Nikita Mikhailis; 11 Alexandr Pissarev; 12 Alexey Antsiferov; 13 Stanislav Zinchenko; 14 Alexandr Nurek; 15 Yaroslav Yevdokimov; 17 Alikhan Assetov; 18 Konstantin Savenkov (C); 19 Mikhail Rakhmanov; 20 Sergey Kudryavtsev; 21 Vladislav Nikulin; 22 Ivan Stepanenko; 23 Anton Petrov; 25 Artem Burdelev; 28 Pavel Akolzin (A); 29 Dmitriy Grents; 30 Maxim Gryaznov | Canada (CAN); 1 Kevin Bailie; 2 Etienne Boutet; 4 Michael Moffat; 5 Alexander Basso; 6 Martin Lefebvre (A); 7 Nathan Chiarlitti (A); 8 Charles-David Beaudoin; 9 Brett Welychka; 11 Olivier Hinse (C); 13 Tommy Giroux; 15 Guillaume Asselin; 16 Pierre-Olivier Morin; 18 Slater Doggett; 19 Brent Pedersen; 20 Corey Durocher; 22 Mathieu Pompei; 23 Eric Ming; 24 Spencer Abraham; 25 Ryan Van Stralen; 26 Scott Simmonds; 27 Michael McNamee; 31 Sebastien Auger |
| Women | Russia (RUS); 1 Valeria Tarakanova; 2 Angelina Goncharenko; 7 Elina Mitrofanova; 9 Alexandra Vafina; 10 Liudmila Belyakova; 11 Liana Ganeyeva; 12 Yekaterina Lobova; 13 Nina Pirogova; 18 Olga Sosina (C); 22 Maria Batalova; 24 Lidia Malyavko; 27 Fanuza Kadirova; 43 Aleksandra Vovrushko; 59 Yelena Dergachyova (A); 68 Alevtina Shtaryova; 69 Maria Sorokina; 70 Anna Shibanova (A); 76 Yekaterina Nikolayeva; 77 Inna Dyubanok; 88 Elena Podkamennaia; 92 Nadezhda Morozova; 94 Yevgenia Dyupina; 97 Anna Shokhina | Canada (CAN); 1 Stephanie Sluys; 2 Alexis Larson; 3 Maude Laramee; 4 Daley Oddy; 6 Kelly Murray; 7 Erica Rieder; 8 Kelly Gribbons; 9 Alexandra Labelle; 10 Kaitlin Willoughby (A); 11 Kelty Apperson; 13 Kylie Gavelin; 14 Alanna Sharman; 15 Jaycee Magwood; 16 Alexandra Poznikoff; 18 Rachel Marriott; 19 Catherine DuBois; 20 Melodie Bouchard; 21 Brianna Iazzolino; 22 Katherine Bailey; 25 Katelyn Gosling (C); 26 Jessica Cormier (A); 30 Valerie Lamenta | United States (USA); 2 Rebecca Senden; 3 Nicole Matthews; 4 Cassandra Dunne (C); 8 Kelsey Jaeckle; 10 Rachael Booth; 11 Brittani Lanzilli; 12 Jessica Rushing (C); 14 Alyssa Visalli; 16 Brittany Levasseur; 17 Lyndsay Oden; 18 Sabrena Camp; 19 Kendra Myers; 20 Leah MacArthur; 21 Kathleen Ash; 22 Madeline Wolsmann; 23 Jordan Anderson; 24 Alexandra Brown; 25 Katelyn Augustine (A); 26 Livia Twohig; 30 Amber Greene; 31 Lauren Allen |

== Medal table ==
| Rank | Nation | Gold | Silver | Bronze | Total |
|---|---|---|---|---|---|
| 1 | Russia | 2 | 0 | 0 | 2 |
| 2 | Canada | 0 | 1 | 1 | 2 |
| 3 | Kazakhstan | 0 | 1 | 0 | 1 |
| 4 | United States | 0 | 0 | 1 | 1 |
| Totals (4 entries) | | 2 | 2 | 2 | 6 |
