= Halyk =

Halyk may refer to:

- Halyk Bank, Kazakh commercial savings bank
- Halyk Arena, a sports venue in Almaty, Kazakhstan
