= Ketner =

Ketner is a surname. Notable people with the surname include:

- Kenneth Laine Ketner, American philosopher
- Lari Ketner (1977–2014), American basketball player
- Nikolas Ketner (born 1991), Czech ice hockey defenceman
- Ralph Ketner (1920–2016), American businessman and philanthropist
