= Akolzin =

Akolzin is a surname. Notable people with the surname include:

- Pavel Akolzin (born 1990), Russian ice hockey player
- Vadim Akolzin (born 1982), Israeli pair skater
