= Maria Batalova =

Russian ice hockey player (born 1996)

Maria Batalova Мария Баталова
- Born: 3 May 1996 (age 30) Mezhdurechye, Alatyrsky District, Chuvash Republic, Russia
- Height: 1.73 m (5 ft 8 in)
- Weight: 69 kg (152 lb; 10 st 12 lb)
- Position: Defence
- Shoots: Left
- ZhHL team Former teams: Agidel Ufa; Tyumenskie Lisitsy; Tornado Moscow Region
- National team: Russia
- Playing career: 2013–present
Medal record
Universiade
| Gold medal – first place | 2015 Granada | Ice hockey |
| Gold medal – first place | 2017 Astana-Almaty | Ice hockey |
| Gold medal – first place | 2019 Krasnoyarsk | Ice hockey |

Maria Viktorovna Batalova (Russian: Мария Викторовна Баталова; born 3 May 1996) is a Russian ice hockey player and member of the Russian national ice hockey team, currently playing in the Zhenskaya Hockey League (ZhHL) with Agidel Ufa.

Batalova participated in the women's ice hockey tournament at the 2018 Winter Olympics with the Olympic Athletes from Russia team and in the IIHF Women's World Championships in 2017, 2019, and 2021. She won gold medals with the Russian team at the Universiades in 2015, 2017, and 2019.
