= Alexandra Labelle =

Canadian ice hockey player (born 1996)

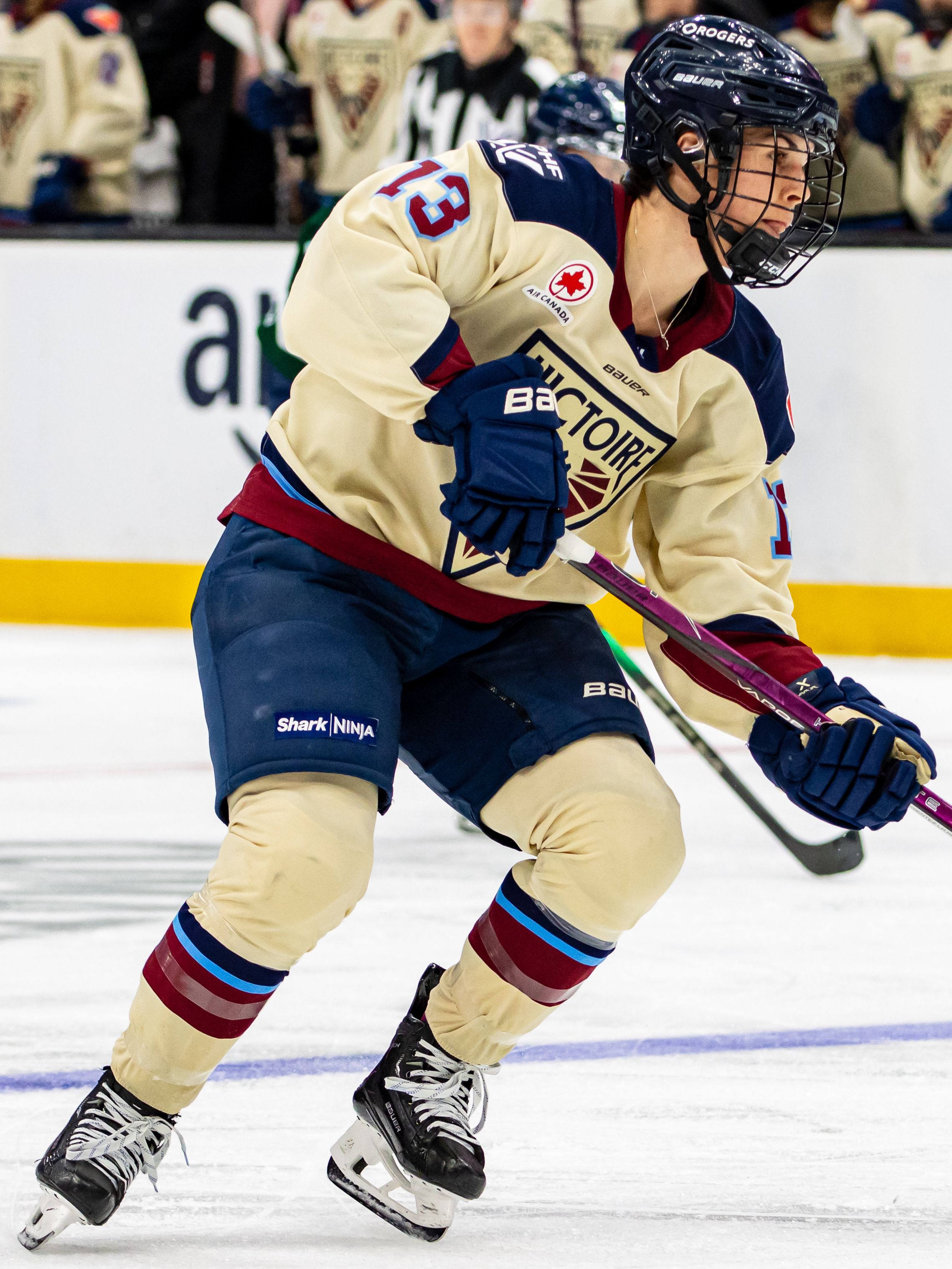
- Labelle with the Montreal Victoire in 2025
- Born: February 27, 1996 (age 30) Saint-Louis-de-Gonzague, Quebec, Canada
- Height: 5 ft 7 in (170 cm)
- Weight: 154 lb (70 kg; 11 st 0 lb)
- Position: Forward
- Shoots: Left
- PWHL team Former teams: Montreal Victoire; PWHL New York; Montreal Force
- Playing career: 2015–present

Alexandra Labelle (born February 27, 1996) is a Canadian professional ice hockey player who is a forward for the Montreal Victoire of the Professional Women's Hockey League (PWHL). She previously played for PWHL New York of the PWHL, and the Montreal Force of the Premier Hockey Federation (PHF).

== Playing career ==
Labelle attended the Université de Montréal where she played ice hockey for the Montreal Carabins from 2015 to 2020. She scored 90 points in 97 games, ranking fifth in team history in points. During the gold medal game at the 2016 CIS Women's Ice Hockey Championship, she recorded a hat-trick, helping lead the Carabins to the championship.

On July 25, 2022, Labelle signed with the Montreal Force of the PHF. During the 2022–23 season, she recorded six goals and seven assists in 24 games. On May 10, 2023, she re-signed with the Force. The PHF ceased operations on June 29, 2023.

On September 18, 2023, Labelle was drafted in the fifteenth round, 88th overall by PWHL New York in the 2023 PWHL Draft. On November 9, 2023, she signed a one-year contract with New York. During the 2023–24 season, she recorded one goal and two assists in 24 games for New York. In October 2024, she was invited to the Montreal Victoire's training camp. On November 26, 2024, she signed with the Victoire. During the 2024–25 season, she recorded one goal and three assists in 19 games. On July 21, 2025, she signed a one-year contract extension with the Victoire. During the 2025–26 season, she recorded four assists in 28 regular season games and helped the Victoire win their first Walter Cup in franchise history. On June 20, 2026, she signed a one-year contract extension with the Victoire.

== International play ==
Medal record

Representing Canada

Ice hockey

Universiade
Silver medal – second place	2017 Almaty	

World U18 Championships
Gold medal – first place	2014 Hungary	

Labelle represented Canada at the 2014 IIHF World Women's U18 Championship where she recorded one goal and three assists in five games and won a gold medal.

She represented Canada at the 2017 Winter Universiade in ice hockey, where she led the tournament in scoring with nine goals and four assists in five games and won a silver medal.

== Career statistics ==
=== Regular season and playoffs ===
			Regular season					Playoffs
Season	Team	League	GP	G	A	Pts	PIM	GP	G	A	Pts	PIM
2015–16	Université de Montréal	RSEQ	20	8	11	19	2	—	—	—	—	—
2016–17	Université de Montréal	RSEQ	19	5	13	18	10	—	—	—	—	—
2017–18	Université de Montréal	RSEQ	20	9	14	23	2	6	2	4	6	6
2018–19	Université de Montréal	RSEQ	20	9	8	17	6	4	3	1	4	4
2019–20	Université de Montréal	RSEQ	18	6	7	13	8	5	0	5	5	4
2020–21	Team Bauer	PWPHA	4	1	2	3	2	—	—	—	—	—
2021–22	Team Bauer	PWPHA	6	0	2	2	0	—	—	—	—	—
2022–23	Montreal Force	PHF	24	6	7	13	12	—	—	—	—	—
2023–24	PWHL New York	PWHL	24	1	2	3	4	—	—	—	—	—
2024–25	Montreal Victoire	PWHL	19	1	3	4	2	—	—	—	—	—
2025–26	Montreal Victoire	PWHL	28	0	4	4	4	9	0	0	0	2
PHF totals			24	6	7	13	12	—	—	—	—	—
PWHL totals			71	2	9	11	10	9	0	0	0	2

=== International ===
Year	Team	Event	Result	GP	G	A	Pts	PIM
2014	Canada	U18	1st place, gold medalist(s)	5	1	3	4	0
Junior totals				5	1	3	4	0

== Awards and honours ==
Honours	Year
PWHL
Walter Cup champion	2026
