= Kelly Murray =

Canadian ice hockey player

- Born: April 26, 1994 (age 32) Medicine Hat, Alberta, Canada
- Height: 170 cm (5 ft 7 in)
- Weight: 75 kg (165 lb; 11 st 11 lb)
- Position: Defence
- Shoots: Left
- Played for: SDE Hockey; Calgary Inferno; UBC Thunderbirds; Cornell Big Red
- Playing career: 2012–present
Medal record
Representing Canada
Women's ice hockey
Universiade
Silver medal – second place	2017 Almaty	Ice hockey

Kelly Murray (born April 26, 1994) is a Canadian ice hockey defenceman.

== Playing career ==
During 2012 to 2014, Murray played college ice hockey with the Cornell Big Red women's ice hockey program in the ECAC Hockey and Ivy League conferences of the NCAA Division I. Injuries limited her number of games played and she appeared in only 37 games across two seasons with the Big Red, amassing a total of 12 points on a goal and 11 assists.

Murray left Cornell to join the UBC Thunderbirds women's ice hockey program of Canadian Interuniversity Sport (CIS; renamed U Sports in 2016) ahead of the 2014–15 season. She played for the team until 2017, serving as an alternate captain for the team and recording 52 points in 80 games. She was named to the 2017 USports women's all-star team.

She was drafted 12th overall by the Calgary Inferno in the 2017 CWHL draft. She signed her first professional contract with the Inferno ahead of the 2017–18 season. She would win the Clarkson Cup with the team the following year.

After the collapse of the CWHL in May 2019, she left North America to sign with SDE Hockey in Sweden. She served as an alternate captain for the team in her first SDHL season, during which she scored 13 points in 34 games as SDE made the playoffs for the first time in history. She scored her first SDHL goal in a 6–0 victory against Göteborg HC on November 17, 2019.

=== International ===
Murray represented Canada in the women's ice hockey tournament at the 2017 Winter Universiade in Almaty. She contributed 5 assists in five games to Canada's silver medal effort.

== Personal life ==
Her sister, Eden Murray, also played professionally with the Inferno. Her uncle, Andy Murray, is a former NHL head coach, her cousins Brady Murray and Jordy Murray both played professional hockey in Switzerland, and her cousin Sarah Murray was head coach of the unified Korean team at the 2018 Winter Olympics.
