= Kaitlin Willoughby =

Canadian ice hockey player (born 1995)

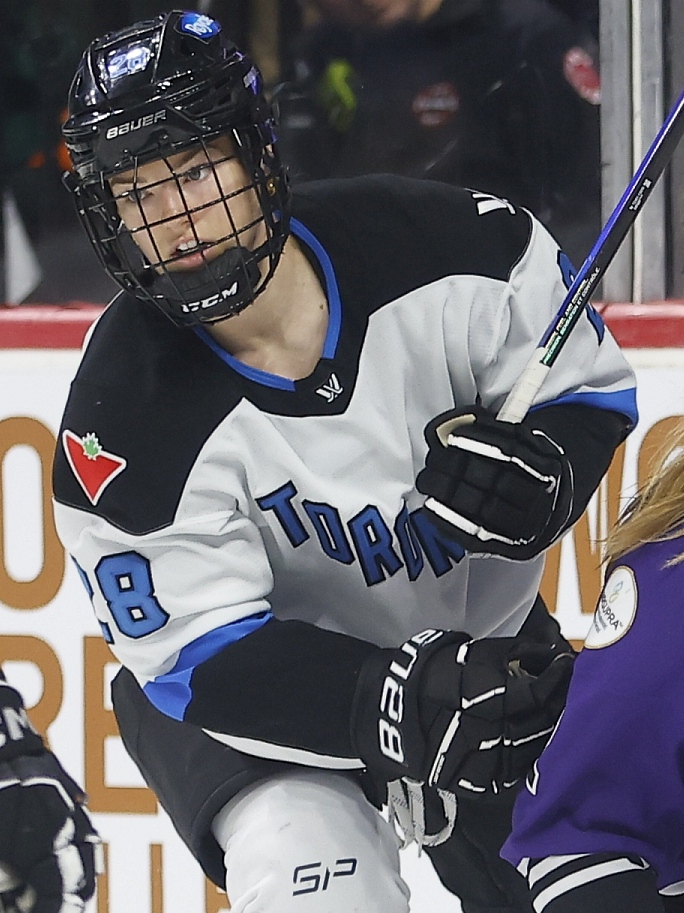
- Willoughby with PWHL Toronto in 2024
- Born: March 26, 1995 (age 31) Prince Albert, Saskatchewan, Canada
- Height: 167 cm (5 ft 6 in)
- Position: Forward
- Shoots: Right
- PWHL team Former teams: Montreal Victoire; Calgary Inferno; Toronto Sceptres
- Playing career: 2013–present

Kaitlin Willoughby (born March 26, 1995) is a Canadian professional ice hockey forward for the Montreal Victoire of the Professional Women's Hockey League (PWHL).

== Career ==
=== USports ===
In high school, Willoughby played for the Prince Albert Bears in her hometown, where she served as team captain. After graduating, she moved to Saskatoon to attend the University of Saskatchewan. Across 132 USports games with the Saskatchewan Huskies, she scored 111 points. After scoring 25 points in 28 games in her rookie university season, she was named USports Rookie of the Year and was named to the 2013-14 Canada West All-Rookie Team. That year, she would also score the game-winning goal as the university won the Canada West conference championship for the first time in history. She would lead the team in scoring for three of the next four seasons and was twice named to the Canada West All-Star Team. She graduated with a degree in Nursing.

=== CWHL ===
She was drafted 37th overall by the Calgary Inferno in the 2018 CWHL Draft. In her rookie CWHL season, she scored 6 points in 27 games, as the Inferno won the Clarkson Cup.

=== PWHPA ===
After the collapse of the CWHL in May 2019, she joined the PWHPA. She was awarded Goal of the Game at the Unifor Women's Hockey Showcase in September 2019, playing for Team Johnston as it lost to Team Jenner 4–3. She earned an assist the next day of the Showcase, as Team Johnston beat Team Knox 6–5 in shootouts. She played for Team Bellamy at the Secret Showcase in January 2020. She would stay with the organisation for the 2020–21 season, being named to the roster for the Calgary section.

=== PWHL ===
Willoughby declared for the 2023 PWHL draft, but went unselected. She signed with PWHL Toronto prior to the 2023–24 season after being invited to their training camp. She recorded one assist in 23 games that season, and then re-signed with Toronto for the 2024–25 season.

On March 13, 2025, she was traded to the Montreal Victoire in exchange for Anna Kjellbin. Prior to being traded she was scoreless in 20 games with the Sceptres. She finished the season with one assist in seven games with the Victoire. On July 8, 2025, she signed a one-year contract extension with the Victoire. She was part of the team which won three games to the Ottawa Charge's one to win the 2026 Walter Cup, becoming the first player born in Saskatchewan to win the championship. Following the victory in the Walter Cup, Willoughby signed a two year contract extension with the Victoire on June 19, 2026.

== International play ==
Willoughby was invited to the 2016 Hockey Canada's Women's Development Camp. She represented Canada at the 2017 and 2019 Winter Universiade, winning silver both times. She served as team captain in 2019.

== Personal life ==
She has a degree in nursing. Her sister, Morgan Willoughby, also played hockey at the University of Saskatchewan.

== Awards and honours ==
Honours	Year
PWHL
Walter Cup champion	2026
