= Martin Lefebvre =

Canadian ice hockey defenceman

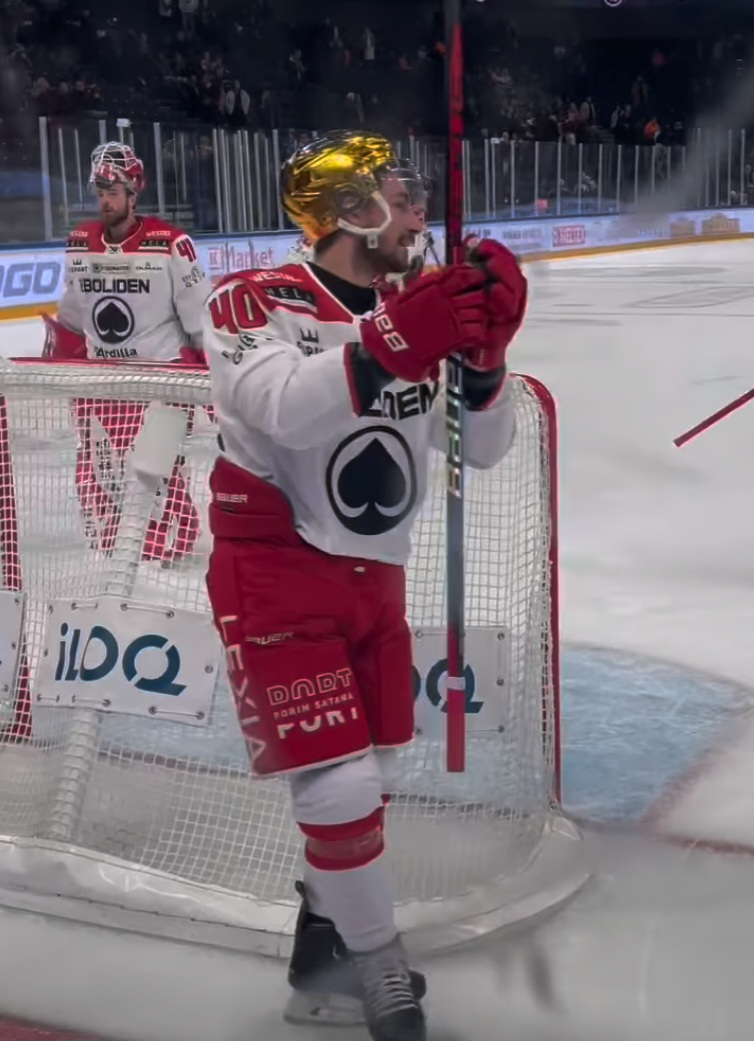
- Lefebvre with Porin Ässät in 2023 wearing the top scorer's golden helmet
- Born: June 23, 1992 (age 33) Terrebonne, Quebec, Canada
- Height: 5 ft 11 in (180 cm)
- Weight: 185 lb (84 kg; 13 st 3 lb)
- Position: Defence
- Shoots: Left
- Slovak team Former teams: HK Poprad; Gwinnett Gladiators; Cincinnati Cyclones; Aalborg Pirates; Krefeld Pinguine; Stavanger Oilers; Porin Ässät; Kunlun Red Star
- NHL draft: Undrafted
- Playing career: 2017–present

Martin Lefebvre (born June 23, 1992) is a Canadian professional ice hockey defenceman who plays for HK Poprad in the Slovak Extraliga. Lefebvre has previously played for Porin Ässät of the SM-liiga, Krefield Pinguine of the DEL, Aalborg Pirates of the Metal Ligaen and Stavanger Oilers of the Fjordkraftligaen. His achievements in said teams include Danish Championship, Danish Cup Championship, Danish League All-Star Team selection, two Norwegian Championships and Fjordjraftligaen Player of the Year award.

== Playing career ==
=== Junior ===
During the 2007–08 season Martin Lefebvre played for Crabtree Draveurs in the QMAAA as a 15 year old. Lefebvre put up 5 goals and 13 assists in 44 games. Lefebvre played 3 playoff games with 2 points.

The next season Lefebvre continued to represent the Collège Esther-Blondin Draveurs in the QMAA. Lefebvre put up 30 points in 34 games. Lefebvre played 15 playoff games with 11 points and won the QMAA Top Defenceman award. He moved to he Quebec Remparts of the QMJHL before the season ended and played 7 games without any points. Lefebvre got to represent the Canada Québec team at the 2009 WHC-17 for 5 games where he scored 6 points.

In the 2013–14 season Lefebvre moved to the Gwinnett Gladiators of the ECHL but he only got to play 14 games before moving to play for UQTR Patriotes in the CIS men's ice hockey league. Lefebvre played 7 games with 8 points.

In the 2016–17 season Lefebvre played for the UQTR Patriotes in the U Sports men's ice hockey league for 22 games putting up 25 points. Lefebvre moved to play for the Cincinnati Cyclones of the ECHL in the middle of the season. Lefebvre played 11 games and put up 7 points. Lefebvre represented Canada at the 2017 Winter Universidade for 6 games where he scored 8 points.

=== Professional ===
In the 2017–18 season Lefebvre moved to Denmark to play for the Aalborg Pirates. Lefebvre played 48 regular season games and put up 36 points. Lefebvre won the Danish Championship and the Danish Cup with the Pirates while also being chosen to the All-Star team.

In the 2018–19 season Lefebvre played for the Krefeld Pinguine in the DEL for 52 games to put up 23 points.

Martin Lefebvre moved to Norway to play for the Stavanger Oilers in the Fjordkraftligaen for the 2021–22 season. Lefebvre put up 39 points in 47 total games. The Oilers went on to win the Norwegian Championship.

Lefebvre was supposed to play for the Bratislava Capitals of the ICEHL for the 2022–23 season, but after the Slovak team decided to not take part in the league, Lefebvre continued to play for the Oilers. Lefebvre had a successful season as he put up 71 points in 59 total games, playoffs included. The Stavanger-based team went on to win their 9th championship and the 2nd in a row. Lefebvre himself won the player of the year award as he led all defencemen in regular season assists (35), goals (17) and points (52). Lefebvre also played 6 Champions Hockey League (CHL) games with the Oilers.

Martin Lefebvre signed a one-year contract with the Porin Ässät for the 2023–24 SM-liiga season. Lefebvre's playing surprised many, as he had scored 12 points in his first 15 SM-liiga games. He was called the most surprising player of the season start by news outlets.

For 2024–25, Lefebvre left Porin Ässät, signing with Kunlun Red Star of the Kontinental Hockey League.

On 4 October 2025, Lefebvre signed with HK Poprad of the Slovak Extraliga.

== Career statistics ==
=== Regular season and playoffs ===
			Regular season					Playoffs
Season	Team	League	GP	G	A	Pts	PIM	GP	G	A	Pts	PIM
2007–08	Crabtree Draveurs	QMAAA	44	5	13	18	36	3	0	2	2	0
2008–09	Collège Esther-Blondin Draveurs	QMAAA	34	15	15	30	26	15	4	7	11	8
2008–09	Quebec Remparts	QMJHL	7	0	0	0	4	—	—	—	—	—
2009–10	Quebec Remparts	QMJHL	55	5	23	28	20	9	0	3	3	6
2010–11	Quebec Remparts	QMJHL	65	10	45	55	20	14	1	9	10	8
2011–12	Quebec Remparts	QMJHL	66	12	39	51	31	11	4	8	12	10
2012–13	Quebec Remparts	QMJHL	56	7	33	40	16	11	1	3	4	0
2013–14	Gwinnett Gladiators	ECHL	14	0	2	2	4	—	—	—	—	—
2013–14	U. of Québec-Trois-Rivières	CIS	7	4	4	8	0	—	—	—	—	—
2014–15	U. of Québec-Trois-Rivières	CIS	14	6	14	20	4	7	2	3	5	2
2015–16	U. of Québec-Trois-Rivières	CIS	28	9	24	33	20	7	2	4	6	2
2016–17	U. of Québec-Trois-Rivières	USports	5	0	1	1	2	—	—	—	—	—
2016–17	Cincinnati Cyclones	ECHL	11	3	4	7	4	—	—	—	—	—
2017–18	Aalborg Pirates	DEN	48	9	27	36	12	17	10	6	16	4
2018–19	Krefeld Pinguine	DEL	52	3	20	23	20	—	—	—	—	—
2019–20	Aalborg Pirates	DEN	8	2	2	4	0	—	—	—	—	—
2020–21	Aalborg Pirates	DEN	19	7	13	20	2	16	5	6	11	4
2021–22	Stavanger Oilers	NOR	35	7	23	30	14	12	3	6	9	0
2022–23	Stavanger Oilers	NOR	44	17	35	52	6	15	4	15	19	6
2023–24	Ässät	Liiga	46	4	23	27	12	—	—	—	—	—
2024–25	Kunlun Red Star	KHL	55	4	8	12	10	—	—	—	—	—
Norway totals			79	24	58	82	20	27	7	21	28	6
Liiga totals			46	4	23	27	12	—	—	—	—	—

=== International ===
Year	Team	Event	Result	GP	G	A	Pts	PIM
2009	Canada Quebec	U17	5th	5	1	5	6	2
Junior totals				5	1	5	6	2
