= Katelyn Gosling =

Canadian women's ice hockey player

- Born: October 5, 1993 (age 32) London, Ontario, Canada
- Height: 5 ft 5 in (165 cm)
- Position: Defence
- Shot: Left
- Played for: Calgary Inferno
- National team: Canada
- Playing career: 2011–2023

Medal record

Women's ice hockey

Representing Canada

Winter Universiade
Silver medal – second place	2015 Spain	Tournament
Silver medal – second place	2017 Kazakhstan	Tournament

Nations Cup
Gold medal – first place	2016 Germany	Tournament
Silver medal – second place	2017 Germany	Tournament

4 Nations Cup
Silver medal – second place	2018 Canada	

Katelyn Gosling (born May 8, 1993) is a Canadian women's ice hockey player. Having earned Canadian Interuniversity Sport All-Canadian honours while competing for the Western Mustangs women's ice hockey program, Gosling was claimed by the Calgary Inferno in the 2016 CWHL Draft. She also competed with Canada's national team at the Winter Universiade, serving as Canada's captain at the 2017 tournament.

== Early life ==
Raised in London, Ontario, Katelyn emerged as a promising hockey player at just six years old. In high school she was the captain of the Mother Teresa Catholic Secondary School hockey team.

== Playing career ==
During her teens, Katelyn played in the Provincial Women's Hockey League for the London Devilettes.

=== Western Mustangs ===
In the aftermath of the 2012-13 season, Gosling was named to the CIS First Team All-Canadians. Among the other players named as First Team All-Canadians were Melodie Daoust and Hayley Wickenheiser.

Katelyn was a co-captain of the Mustangs program that captured the gold medal at the 2015 CIS women's ice hockey national championships. Her sister, Cassidy Gossling was also a member of the championship team. In her final season with the Western Mustangs, Gosling was named a First Team All-Canadian.

=== International play ===
Katelyn was a member of the Team Canada squad that captured a silver medal at the 2015 Winter Universiade Games in Spain. She served as Team Canada's captain for the 2017 Winter Universiade in Kazakhstan, as Canada obtained another silver medal.

In May 2015, Katelyn was invited to Team Canada's Development Team Conditioning camp.

Competing with Canada's Under-22 national team at the 2016 Nations Cup, Gosling scored her first international goal, which took place in a 4-2 win against Russia, which also stood as the game-winning tally. The win allowed Canada to advance to the gold medal game.

Gosling competed for the Canadian Under-22 national team that competed at the 2017 Nations Cup. Gosling and her Canadian teammates emerged with a silver medal at the Nations Cup, losing to Finland by a 1-0 tally.

Gosling was named to the Canadian roster that played at the 2018 4 Nations Cup.

=== CWHL ===
Selected by the Calgary Inferno in the second round of the 2016 CWHL Draft, Gosling made her debut with the club on October 9, 2016, a contest against the Brampton Thunder. Gosling also earned her first CWHL point in the contest, gaining an assist on a goal scored by Jillian Saulnier.

Gosling's first CWHL goal took place in only her second career game. An October 29 tilt with the Boston Blades saw her score in the third period against goaltender Lauren Dahm. Earning the assist on her goal was Rhianna Kurio.

Named as one of the participants in the 3rd CWHL All-Star Game, Gosling appeared for Team Blue in a 9-5 loss. She also appeared with the Inferno in the 2019 Clarkson Cup finals, capturing her first championship in the CWHL.

== Personal life ==
Gosling's cousins, Julia Gosling and Nicole Gosling are both ice hockey players.

== Career statistics ==
			Regular season					Playoffs
Season	Team	League	GP	G	A	Pts	PIM	GP	G	A	Pts	PIM
2008–09	London Jr. Devilettes	Prov. WHL	34	0	3	3	40	3	0	0	0	10
2009–10	London Jr. Devilettes	Prov. WHL	34	2	10	12	26	2	0	0	0	2
2010–11	London Jr. Devilettes	Prov. WHL	36	3	12	15	22	3	1	2	3	0
2011–12	University of Western Ontario	OUA	26	2	11	13	18	7	0	5	5	4
2012–13	University of Western Ontario	OUA	26	7	19	26	14	7	4	1	5	4
2013–14	University of Western Ontario	OUA	18	3	8	11	10	3	2	3	5	2
2014–15	University of Western Ontario	OUA	20	4	11	15	4	5	0	5	5	2
2015–16	University of Western Ontario	OUA	24	4	14	18	20	—	—	—	—	—
2016–17	Calgary Inferno	CWHL	19	6	5	11	4	—	—	—	—	—
2017–18	Calgary Inferno	CWHL	28	7	11	18	18	3	0	0	0	0
2018–19	Calgary Inferno	CWHL	25	9	7	16	12	4	0	2	2	2
2020–21	Calgary	PWHPA	4	0	2	2	2	—	—	—	—	—
2021–22	Calgary	PWHPA	10	1	5	6	4	—	—	—	—	—
2022–23	Team Scotiabank	PWHPA	9	0	2	2	2	—	—	—	—	—
CWHL totals			72	22	23	45	34	7	0	2	2	2

== Awards and honours ==
- 2012, OUA All Rookie Team
- 2013, CIS First Team All-Canadian
- 2013, OUA First Team All Star
- 2014, OUA First Team All Star
- 2014, Western Women's Hockey Team MVP
- 2015, CIS Nationals Tournament All-Star Team
- 2015, CIS Second Team All-Canadian
- 2015, OUA First Team All Star
- 2016, CIS First-Team All-Canadian
- Participant, 3rd CWHL All-Star Game
