= Kevin Bailie =

Canadian ice hockey player

- Born: January 3, 1992 (age 34) Belleville, Ontario, Canada
- Height: 6 ft 3 in (191 cm)
- Weight: 209 lb (95 kg; 14 st 13 lb)
- Position: Goaltender
- Shot: Left
- Played for: Oshawa Generals; London Knights; Queen's University
- National team: Canada
- NHL draft: Undrafted
- Playing career: 2007–2019

Kevin Bailie (born January 3, 1992) is a former Canadian ice hockey player and current corporate lawyer. He played hockey for the Oshawa Generals and London Knights in the Ontario Hockey League prior to attending Queen's University. During both his undergraduate and graduate studies he continued playing for the Gaels at Queen's University and had brief tryouts with the Ottawa Senators and Montreal Canadiens before ultimately retiring in favour of a career in law.

== Playing career ==
=== Major junior ===
Bailie was drafted in the first round, 16th overall by the Oshawa Generals in the 2008 OHL Draft.

Notable moments in Bailie's OHL career include playing alongside Toronto Maple Leaf superstar John Tavares, helping propel the London Knights to a 24-game winning streak, and winning a record setting 19-round shootout against the Mississauga Steelheads.

=== Collegiate ===
During his time at Queen's University Bailie was distinguished several times for both academic and athletic achievements.

In 2015 Bailie was named the 30th recipient of the Robinson-Kelleher Memorial Award which is presented by the City of Belleville annually to the individual selected as its athlete of the year. Past winners include other local hockey players Andrew Raycroft and Andrew Shaw.

== Career statistics ==
| | | | Regular season | | | | | | | | | Playoffs |
| Season | Team | League | GP | W | L | T/OT | MIN | GA | SO | GAA | SV% | GP | W | L | MIN | GA | SO | GAA | SV% |
|---|---|---|---|---|---|---|---|---|---|---|---|---|---|---|---|---|---|---|---|
| 2007–08 | Quinte Red Devils Minor Mdgt AAA | ETAMMHL | 43 | — | — | — | — | — | — | 1.81 | — | — | — | — | — | — | — | — | — |
| 2008–09 | Oshawa Generals | OHL | 13 | 5 | 4 | 1 | 512 | 34 | 0 | 3.98 | .882 | — | — | — | — | — | — | — | — |
| 2009–10 | Oshawa Generals | OHL | 34 | 10 | 11 | 2 | 1578 | 116 | 0 | 4.41 | .871 | — | — | — | — | — | — | — | — |
| 2010–11 | Oshawa Generals | OHL | 20 | 7 | 8 | 3 | 1036 | 64 | 1 | 3.71 | .875 | 1 | 0 | 0 | — | — | — | 3.84 | .871 |
| 2011–12 | Oshawa Generals | OHL | 42 | 20 | 14 | 4 | 2361 | 124 | 1 | 3.15 | .910 | 2 | 0 | 2 | — | — | — | 8.25 | .804 |
| 2012–13 | London Knights | OHL | 27 | 18 | 4 | 1 | 1465 | 61 | 2 | 2.50 | .921 | — | — | — | — | — | — | — | — |
| 2012–13 | Summerside Western Capitals | MHL | 11 | 10 | 1 | 0 | — | — | — | 1.90 | .929 | 11 | 10 | 1 | — | — | — | 1.81 | .934 |
| 2013–14 | Queen's U | U Sports | 20 | 11 | 9 | 0 | 1180 | 39 | 2 | 1.98 | .934 | 5 | 3 | 2 | — | — | — | — | — |
| 2014–15 | Queen's U | U Sports | 24 | 10 | 13 | 0 | 1388 | 60 | 1 | 2.59 | .922 | 5 | 2 | 3 | — | — | — | — | — |
| 2015–16 | Queen's U | U Sports | 23 | 14 | 9 | 0 | 1406 | 51 | 3 | 2.18 | .942 | 3 | 1 | 2 | — | — | — | — | — |
| 2016–17 | Queen's U | U Sports | 14 | 8 | 6 | 0 | 856 | 33 | 3 | 2.31 | .925 | 9 | 6 | 3 | — | — | — | 1.39 | .960 |
| 2017–18 | Queen's U | U Sports | 13 | 10 | 3 | 0 | 784 | 33 | 1 | 2.53 | .920 | 5 | — | — | — | — | — | 1.90 | .942 |
| 2018–19 | Laval Rocket | AHL | — | — | — | — | — | — | — | — | — | — | — | — | — | — | — | — | — |
| AHL totals | | | — | — | — | — | — | — | — | — | — | — | — | — | — | — | — | — | — |

=== Tournament ===
| Year | Team | Event | Result | GP | W | L | T/OT | MIN | GA | SO | GAA | SV% |
|---|---|---|---|---|---|---|---|---|---|---|---|---|
| 2013 | Summerside Western Capitals | RBC Cup | 2nd place, silver medalist(s) | 5 | — | — | — | — | — | — | 2.03 | — |
| 2014 | Queen's U | Carr-Harris Cup | 1st place, gold medalist(s) | 1 | — | — | — | — | — | — | 2.00 | .956 |
| 2015 | Queen's U | Carr-Harris Cup | 1st place, gold medalist(s) | 1 | — | — | — | — | — | — | 1.00 | .952 |

=== International ===
| Year | Team | Event | Result | GP | W | L | T/OT | MIN | GA | SO | GAA | SV% |
|---|---|---|---|---|---|---|---|---|---|---|---|---|
| 2017 | Canada | FISU Games | 3rd place, bronze medalist(s) | 5 | — | — | — | — | — | — | 2.46 | .906 |

== Awards and honours ==
| Award | Year |
OHL
| CHL Goalie of the Week | 2012 |
MHL
| RBC Cup Top Goaltender | 2013 |
| MHL Best GAA (1.90) | 2013 |
| MHL Best SVS% (9.29) | 2013 |
| MHL Champion | 2013 |
U Sports
| OUA All-Rookie Team | 2014 |
| OUA First Team All-Star | 2014, 2016 |
| OUA MVP | 2014 |
| OUA Rookie of the Year | 2014 |
| U Sports All-Canadian Rookie Team | 2014 |
| Clare Drake Award | 2014 |
| U Sports Second Team All-Canadian | 2016 |
| OUA Second Team All-Star | 2018 |
| OUA Champion | 2019 |
International
| Universiade Bronze Medal | 2017 |
