= Roman Kudinov =

Russian ice hockey player

- Born: June 23, 1992 (age 32); Moscow, Russia
- Height: 5 ft 11 in (180 cm)
- Weight: 187 lb (85 kg; 13 st 5 lb)
- Position: Defence
- Shoots: Left
- VHL team Former teams: Dynamo St. Petersburg; HC Vityaz
- NHL draft: Undrafted
- Playing career: 2011–present

Roman Kudinov (born June 23, 1992) is a Russian professional ice hockey defenceman currently playing for Dynamo St. Petersburg in the Supreme Hockey League (VHL).

Kudinov played with HC Vityaz Podolsk of the Kontinental Hockey League (KHL) during the 2012–13 season.
