= Halyk Arena =

Sports arena in Almaty, Kazakhstan

Coordinates: 43.2869°N 76.9898°E

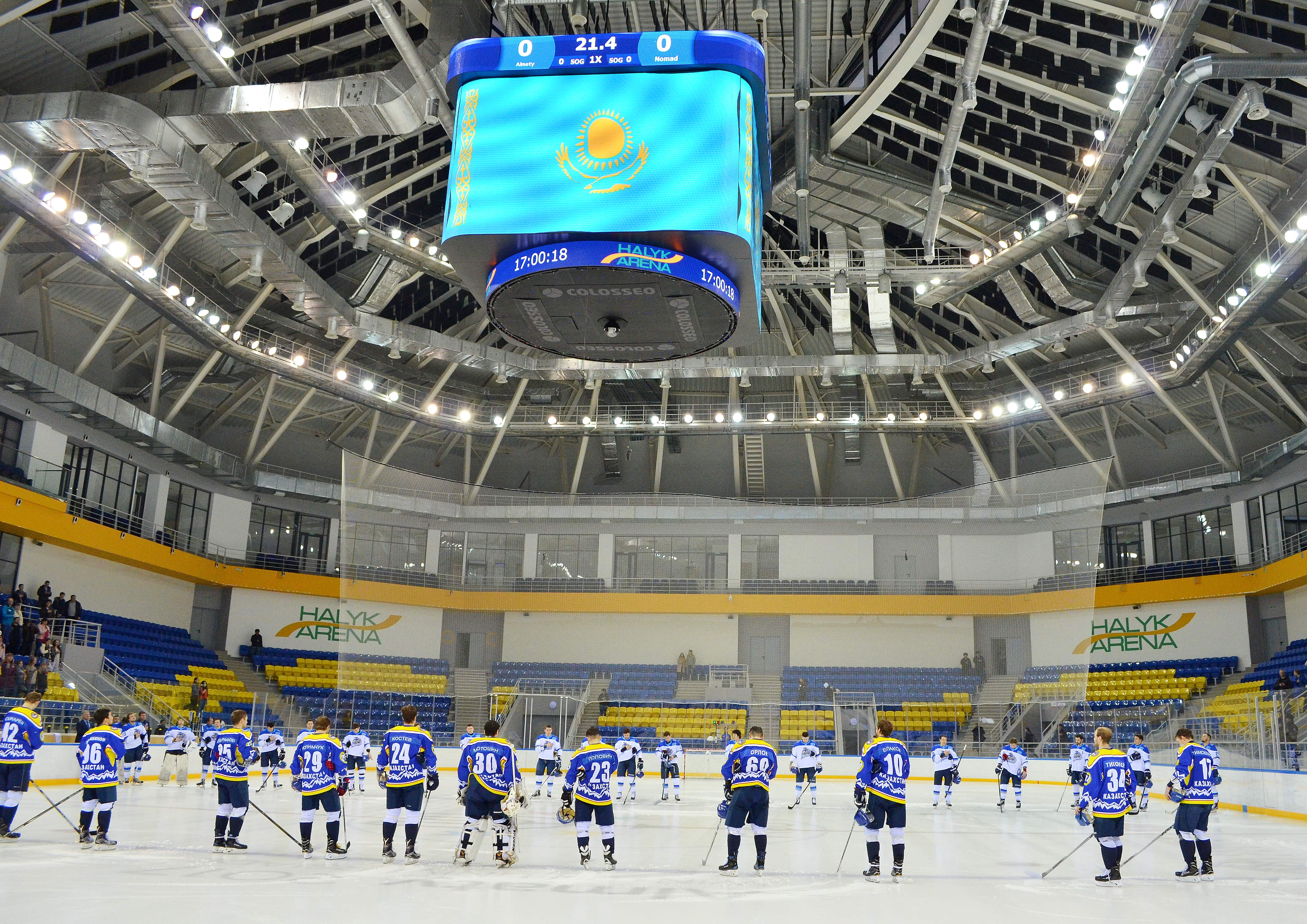
- Interactive map of Halyk Arena
- Address: Almaty; Kazakhstan

Construction
- Opened: 2016
- Construction cost: 23,4 billion KZT

Tenants
- HC Almaty

Halyk Arena Ice Palace (Russian: Халык Арена, tr. halyk arena) is a palace of sports and culture in Almaty, Kazakhstan, built in 2016 for the 2017 Winter Universiade. The venue is designed for such sports events as ice hockey, figure skating and other sports.

== History ==
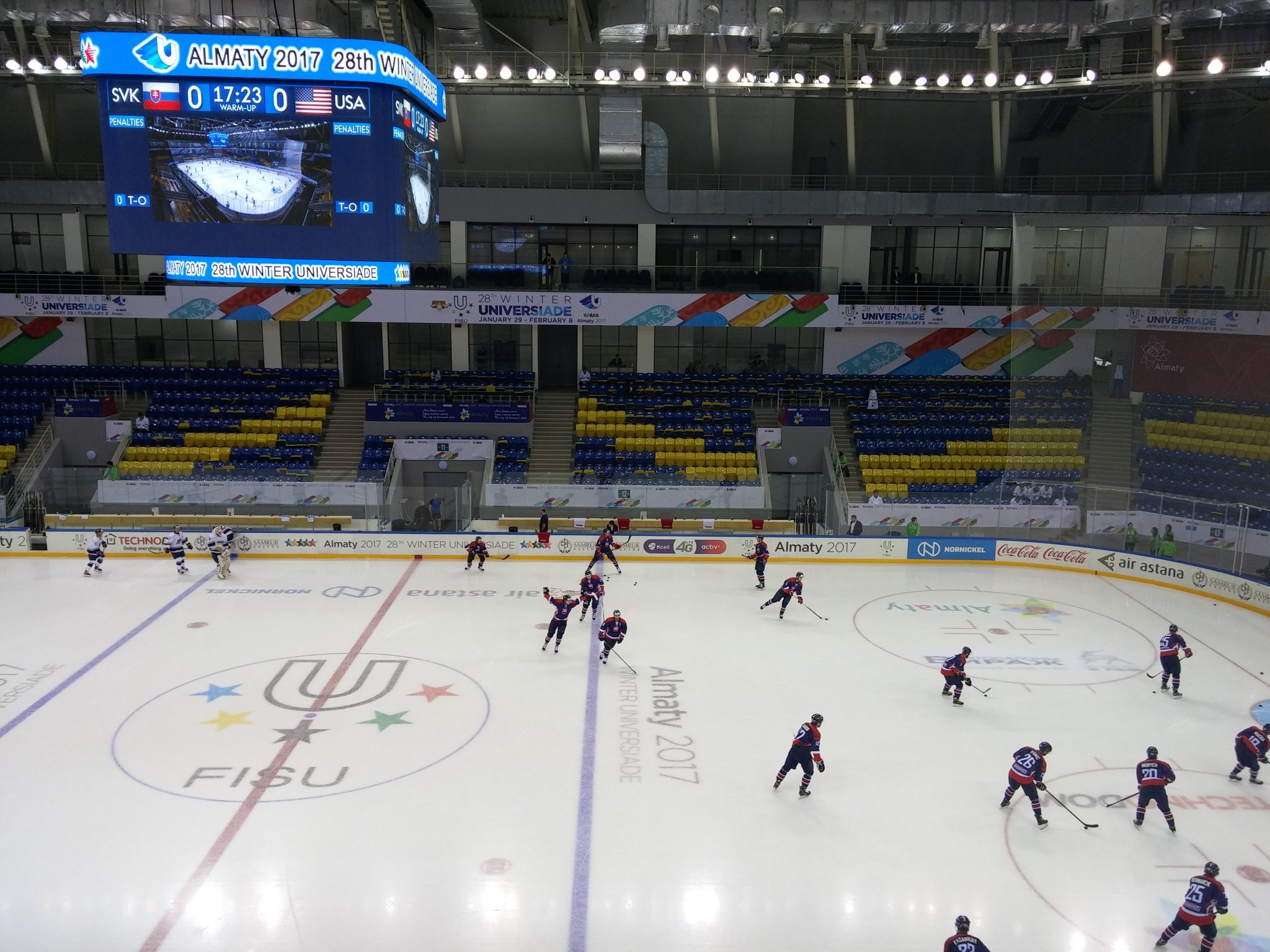
The 2017 Universiade Ice Hockey Tournament Match

After Almaty won the bid to host the 2017 Winter Universiade and submitted a bid to host the 2022 Winter Olympics, the city authorities faced the need to build a new ice arena for curling competitions. On 27 March 2014, Akim Akhmedjan Essimov announced the construction of a new arena for 3,000 spectators with a training rink.

On 19 September 2016, Halyk Arena was officially opened in the presence of former Kazakhstan President Nursultan Nazarbayev. In honor of the arena's opening, the bronze medalist of the 2014 Winter Olympics in figure skating, Denis Ten, conducted a master class.

Children's sections for swimming, wrestling and other sports have been opened in the complex.

Since the beginning of the COVID-19 pandemic in 2020, the building has been used as a hospital for the treatment of Almaty residents. The capacity of "Halyk Arena" is 7011 beds and 250 intensive care beds.

== Characteristics ==
The ice arena is located on an area of 11 hectares near the intersection of the Kuldzhinskiy tract and the Eastern bypass road in the Medeu District of Almaty. Kazakhstani building materials, including energy-saving glass, were mainly used in the construction, and only the roof was made of special steel profiled sheeting made in Germany. The Kazakhstani content accounts for approximately 60% of the construction. The ice arena consists of three blocks - main, auxiliary and administrative. The core of the building is a hockey arena with the size of 61 x 30 meters with a capacity of 3,207 spectators. All necessary conditions for athletes, referees, media representatives and doping control are provided here. Arena is designed so that a hockey court can be transformed into a platform for many individual and team sports - volleyball, basketball, futsal, wrestling, boxing. Protection of ice in this case provides a special thermal coating. Technical equipment of the complex allows holding major concerts and entertainment events. The complex is designed for concerts, cultural events and is equipped with the most modern lighting and sound equipment, and can accommodate more than 150 thousand visitors per year.

== Title ==
The title sponsor of the arena was the National Bank of Kazakhstan (Halyk Bank). It is noted that this is the first such experience in Kazakhstan, when a sports facility in Kazakhstan was named after the sponsor. In September 2016, Äkim of Almaty Bauyrjan Baibek said that "for the first time in Kazakhstan, commercial naming of sports facilities of the Universiade, that is, the temporary assignment of the name of the facility for a fixed annual fee. Advertising market experts note that in Kazakhstan, as well as in the Commonwealth of Independent States, space naming is not particularly in demand.

== Events ==
=== Sports events ===
- 2017, February - Men's Ice Hockey Tournament of the 2017 Winter Universiade
- 2018, August - Futsal World Championship among students
- 2018, 7–9 December - 2018–19 ISU Short Track Speed Skating World Cup stage
- 2019, 30 March - MMA QAZAQSTANDA (Mixed martial arts in Kazakhstan).

=== Music events ===
- 2017, 9 April - Scriptonite concert (Kazakhstan)
- 2017, 22 October - Max Korzh concert (Belarus)
- 2018, 22 September - Gala concert of the national selection "Junior Eurovision 2018".
- 2018, 4 November - Max Korzh concert (Belarus)
- 2019, 14 April - Oxxxymiron concert (RF)

== See also ==
- List of indoor arenas in Kazakhstan
