= Guillaume Asselin =

Canadian ice hockey player

- Born: September 9, 1992 (age 33) Québec City, Québec, Canada
- Height: 5 ft 11 in (180 cm)
- Weight: 194 lb (88 kg; 13 st 12 lb)
- Position: Right wing
- Shoots: Right
- SL team Former teams: EHC Olten; HC Banska Bystrica; HC Sierre; HC Ajoie
- Playing career: 2017–present

Guillaume Asselin (born September 9, 1992) is a Canadian professional ice hockey right winger who currently plays for EHC Olten of the Swiss League (SL). He previously played with HC Banska Bystrica of the Slovak Extraliga, with HC Sierre of the SL and with HC Ajoie of the National League (NL).

== Playing career ==
Asselin played junior hockey with the Chicoutimi Saguenéens of the Quebec Major Junior Hockey League (QMJHL) before enrolling at Université du Québec à Trois-Rivières where he played hockey with the UQTR Patriotes. Asselin briefly played in the ECHL at the conclusion of his college career before signing a one-year deal with HC Banska Bystrica of the Slovak Extraliga on October 31, 2017. He went on to win the Slovak championship and agreed to a one-year contract extension with the team on July 10, 2018.

On June 4, 2019, Asselin signed a one-year contract with HC Sierre of the Swiss League (SL). On February 4, 2020, Asselin agreed to a two-year contract extension with HC Sierre through the 2021-22 season. On January 14, 2021, Asselin was loaned to Genève-Servette HC of the National League (NL). He made his NL debut the next day on January 15, 2021 against the ZSC Lions and scored an OT game-winning goal. He returned to Sierre following that game and was back in the lineup with the SL side the next day. On March 5, 2021, with two games remaining in the SL regular season and with Sierre having already clinched a playoffs spot, Asselin was again loaned to Servette for the next three games, allowing him to return to Sierre for the start of the playoffs. Before rejoining HC Sierre, Asselin scored his first NL hat trick on March 7, 2021, in a 5–1 win against Lausanne HC at the Patinoire des Vernets. On March 18, 2021, Asselin was retroactively issued a game misconduct and a CHF 800 fine for spearing EHC Olten's David Stämpfli in game 1 of the playoffs 1/4 finals on March 17, 2021. Once Sierre got eliminated from the SL playoffs, Asselin joined Servette's reserve squad for their playoffs run in the NL. Asselin only played one game when he stepped in as a replacement for Linus Omark in game 1 of the NL final.

On May 20, 2021, Asselin joined newly promoted HC Ajoie on a two-year deal. On March 31, 2023, Asselin was signed to a one-year contract extension with HC Ajoie for the 2023/24 season.

On March 26, 2024, Asselin agreed to a two-year contract with EHC Olten to return to the SL.

== Personal life ==
On February 3, 2021, Asselin and his wife welcomed their first child.
