= Roman Tatalin =

Russian ice hockey player

- Born: November 19, 1992 (age 32); Novosibirsk, Russia
- Height: 5 ft 11 in (180 cm)
- Weight: 152 lb (69 kg; 10 st 12 lb)
- Position: Defence
- Shoots: Right
- VHL team Former teams: Humo Tashkent; HC Vityaz; Spartak Moscow; Metallurg Novokuznetsk; Admiral Vladivostok
- Playing career: 2012–present

Roman Tatalin (born November 19, 1992) is a Russian professional ice hockey defenceman currently playing with Humo Tashkent in the Supreme Hockey League (VHL).

Tatalin played with HC Vityaz Podolsk of the Kontinental Hockey League (KHL) during the 2012–13 season.
