= Madiyar Ibraibekov =

Kazakhstani ice hockey player

- Born: September 4, 1995 (age 29); Moscow, Russia
- Height: 6 ft 2 in (188 cm)
- Weight: 174 lb (79 kg; 12 st 6 lb)
- Position: Defence
- Shoots: Left
- KHL team: Barys Astana
- National team: Kazakhstan
- NHL draft: Undrafted
- Playing career: 2014–present

Madiyar Sandybaiuly Ibraibekov (Kazakh: Мадияр Сандыбайұлы Ибрайбеков; born September 4, 1995) a Kazakh professional ice hockey defenceman who played for Barys Astana of the Kontinental Hockey League (KHL).

== Career statistics ==
=== Regular season and playoffs ===
			Regular season					Playoffs
Season	Team	League	GP	G	A	Pts	PIM	GP	G	A	Pts	PIM
2011–12	Nomad Astana	KAZ	54	0	4	4	24	—	—	—	—	—
2012–13	Snezhnye Barsy Astana	MHL	51	0	2	2	58	—	—	—	—	—
2013–14	Snezhnye Barsy Astana	MHL	56	3	7	10	52	3	0	0	0	0
2014–15	Barys Astana	KHL	14	0	0	0	2	—	—	—	—	—
2014–15	Nomad Astana	KAZ	15	0	3	3	18	—	—	—	—	—
2014–15	Snezhnye Barsy Astana	MHL	19	0	4	4	16	5	1	3	4	24
KHL totals			14	0	0	0	2	—	—	—	—	—

=== International ===
Year	Team	Comp	GP	G	A	Pts	PIM
2012	Kazakhstan U18	U18 (Div I)	2	0	1	1	25
2013	Kazakhstan U18	U18 (Div I)	5	1	3	4	2
2013	Kazakhstan U20	WJC (Div I)	5	0	0	0	0
2014	Kazakhstan U20	WJC (Div I)	5	1	4	5	6
2015	Kazakhstan U20	WJC (Div I)	5	0	5	5	2
Junior int'l totals			22	2	13	15	35
