= Kim Do-hyung =

South Korean footballer (born 1990)

Personal information
- Date of birth: 6 October 1990 (age 36)
- Place of birth: Ulsan, South Korea
- Height: 1.82 m (6 ft 0 in)
- Position: Forward

Team information
- Current team: Busan I'Park FC
- Number: 6

Youth career
- 2001–2002: Ulsan Hyundai
- 2003–2004: Masan Jungang Middle School
- 2005: Hyojung Middle School
- 2006–2008: Gyeongnam Information High School
- 2009–2012: Dong-a University

Senior career*
Years	Team	Apps	(Gls)
2013	Busan IPark	2	(0)
2013–2014	Jeonju Citizen		
2014–2015	Yanbian Funde	18	(2)
2015–2016	Chungju Hummel	53	(8)
2016–2018	Gimcheon Sangmu	23	(4)
2018–2020	Pohang Steelers	19	(2)
2020	Daejeon Korail	2	(0)
2020–2021	Suwon	6	(0)
2021	Hwaseong	23	(0)
2022-	Busan I'Park FC	9	(0)
- * Club domestic league appearances and goals as of 10 October 2022

- Kim Do-hyung
- Hangul: 김도형
- Hanja: 金度亨
- RR: Gim Dohyeong
- MR: Kim Tohyŏng

Kim Do-hyung (Korean: 김도형; born 6 October 1990) is a South Korean footballer who plays as a forward for Busan I'Park FC.

== Career statistics ==
=== Club ===
As of 27 August 2021.

Club	Season	League			Cup		Other		Total	
Club	Season	Division	Apps	Goals	Apps	Goals	Apps	Goals	Apps	Goals
Busan IPark	2013	K League Classic	2	0	1 (Note: Appearances in the Korean FA Cup)	0	0	0	3	0
Yanbian Funde	2014	China League One	18	2	1 (Note: Appearances in the Chinese FA Cup)	0	0	0	19	2
Chungju Hummel	2015	K League Challenge	19	5	0	0	0	0	2	0
Chungju Hummel	2016	K League Challenge	34	3	0	0	0	0	2	0
Chungju Hummel	Total		53	8	0	0	0	0	53	8
Gimcheon Sangmu	2017	K League Classic	2	0	1	0	0	0	3	0
Gimcheon Sangmu	2018	K League 1	21	4	0	0	0	0	21	4
Gimcheon Sangmu	Total		23	4	1	0	0	0	24	4
Pohang Steelers	2018	K League 1	10	2	0	0	0	0	10	2
Pohang Steelers	2018	K League 1	9	0	0	0	0	0	9	0
Pohang Steelers	Total		19	2	0	0	0	0	19	2
Daejeon Korail	2020	K3 League	2	0	1	0	0	0	3	0
Suwon	2020	K League 2	6	0	1	0	0	0	7	0
Hwaseong	2021	K3 League	16	0	1	0	0	0	17	0
Career total			139	16	6	0	0	0	145	16
