= Vladimir Grebenshchikov =

Kazakhstani ice hockey player

- Born: August 14, 1992 (age 33); Temirtau, Kazakhstan
- Height: 5 ft 11 in (180 cm)
- Weight: 172 lb (78 kg; 12 st 4 lb)
- Position: Defence
- Shoots: Left
- KAZ team Former teams: Arlan Kokshetau; Barys Astana
- NHL draft: Undrafted
- Playing career: 2010–present

Vladimir Andreyevich Grebenshchikov (Russian: Владимир Андреевич Гребенщиков; born August 14, 1992) is a Kazakhstani professional ice hockey defenceman who is currently playing with Arlan Kokshetau in the Kazakhstan Hockey Championship (KAZ). He has formerly played with Barys Astana in the Kontinental Hockey League (KHL).

== Career statistics ==
=== Regular season ===
			Regular season					Playoffs
Season	Team	League	GP	G	A	Pts	PIM	GP	G	A	Pts	PIM
2007–08	Nomad Astana	RUS-3	48	1	8	9	94	—	—	—	—	—
2009–10	Nomad Astana	KAZ	54	1	3	4	80	—	—	—	—	—
2010–11	Snezhnye Barsy Astana	MHL	56	3	10	13	52	—	—	—	—	—
2011–12	Nomad Astana	KAZ	50	3	9	12	72	15	1	1	2	24
2012–13	Nomad Astana	KAZ	40	2	5	7	52	5	0	0	0	4
2013–14	Barys Astana	KHL	28	2	3	5	16	3	0	0	0	2
2013–14	Nomad Astana	KAZ	5	1	1	2	4	—	—	—	—	—
2014–15	Barys Astana	KHL	7	0	0	0	10	—	—	—	—	—
2014–15	Nomad Astana	KAZ	32	1	12	13	44	—	—	—	—	—
2015–16	Nomad Astana	KAZ	23	5	4	9	28	—	—	—	—	—
2015–16	Kulager Petropavl	KAZ	28	2	7	9	28	5	0	1	1	29
2016–17	Yertis Pavlodar	KAZ	34	3	6	9	47	6	0	0	0	6
2017–18	Nomad Astana	KAZ	49	5	15	20	30	16	2	1	3	10
2018–19	Altay-Torpedo	KAZ	36	1	10	11	16	—	—	—	—	—
2019–20	Arlan Kokshetau	KAZ	51	3	19	22	38	—	—	—	—	—
KHL totals			35	2	3	5	26	3	0	0	0	2

=== International ===
Year	Team	Event	GP	G	A	Pts	PIM
2009	Kazakhstan U18	U18 (Div I)	5	0	1	1	4
2010	Kazakhstan U18	U18 (Div I)	5	0	1	1	4
2011	Kazakhstan U20	WJC (Div I)	5	0	3	3	6
2012	Kazakhstan U20	WJC (Div I)	5	1	1	2	8
Junior int'l totals			20	1	6	6	22

== Awards ==
- Named KHL Rookie of the Week on November 5, 2013.
