= Yukiko Kawashima =

Japanese ice hockey player

- Born: November 16, 1996 (age 29) Hokkaido, Japan
- Height: 1.64 m (5 ft 5 in)
- Weight: 62 kg (137 lb; 9 st 11 lb)
- Position: Defence
- Shot: Left
- J-League team: Mitsuboshi Daito Perigrine
- National team: Japan
- Playing career: 2015–2022

Yukiko Kawashima (川島 有紀子, Kawashima Yukiko; born November 16, 1996) is a Japanese ice hockey player for Mitsuboshi Daito Perigrine and the Japanese national team. She participated at the 2015 IIHF Women's World Championship.
