= Māris Diļevka =

Latvian ice hockey player

- Born: March 3, 1992 (age 33); Riga, Latvia
- Height: 5 ft 10 in (178 cm)
- Weight: 176 lb (80 kg; 12 st 8 lb)
- Position: Forward
- Shoots: Left
- BXL team: HK Liepājas Metalurgs
- NHL draft: Undrafted
- Playing career: 2008–present

Māris Diļevka (born March 3, 1992) is a Latvian professional ice hockey player. He is currently playing for HK Liepājas Metalurgs of the Belarusian Extraleague.

He participated at the 2012 World Junior Ice Hockey Championships as a member of the Latvia men's national junior ice hockey team.
