= Christian Persson =

Swedish equestrian

Personal information
- Full name: Gert Christian Persson
- Nationality: Swedish
- Born: 6 May 1957 (age 69) Önnestad, Kristianstad, Skåne, Sweden

Sport
- Sport: Equestrian
Medal record
Equestrian
Representing Sweden
European Championships
Gold medal – first place	1983 Frauenfeld	Team eventing
Bronze medal – third place	1983 Frauenfeld	Individual eventing

Gert Christian Persson (born 6 May 1957 in Önnestad) is a Swedish equestrian. He competed in two events at the 1984 Summer Olympics.
