= Dominik Kafka =

Czech ice hockey player

- Born: 2 February 1996 (age 29) Czech Republic
- Height: 170 cm (5 ft 7 in)
- Weight: 68 kg (150 lb; 10 st 10 lb)
- Position: Forward
- Shoots: Right
- Czech4 team Former teams: HC Frýdek-Místek B HC Vítkovice
- Playing career: 2015–present

Dominik Kafka (born 2 February 1996) is a Czech ice hockey forward currently playing for HC Frýdek-Místek B of the Czech4.
