= Daniil Ilyin =

Russian ice hockey player (born 1995)

- Born: June 17, 1995 (age 29); Penza, Russia
- Height: 5 ft 11 in (180 cm)
- Weight: 187 lb (85 kg; 13 st 5 lb)
- Position: Forward
- Shoots: Left
- KHL team Former teams: Free Agent; Torpedo Nizhny Novgorod; HC Yugra; Traktor Chelyabinsk; HC Sochi; Admiral Vladivostok
- Playing career: 2014–present

Daniil Ilyin (born June 17, 1995) is a Russian professional ice hockey player. He is currently an unrestricted free agent who most recently played with Admiral Vladivostok of the Kontinental Hockey League (KHL).

On February 24, 2015, Ilyin made his Kontinental Hockey League debut playing with Torpedo Nizhny Novgorod during the 2014–15 KHL season.
