= Anton Sagadeyev =

- Born: 6 September 1993 (age 31); Temirtau, Kazakhstan
- Height: 1.80 m (5 ft 11 in)
- Weight: 86 kg (190 lb; 13 st 8 lb)
- Position: Centre
- Shoots: Left
- KHL team Former teams: Admiral Vladivostok; Barys Astana; Lokomotiv Yaroslavl; HC Sochi
- National team: Kazakhstan
- Playing career: 2014–present

Anton Olegovich Sagadeyev (Russian: Антон Олегович Сагадеев; born 6 September 1993) is a Kazakhstani ice hockey player for Admiral Vladivostok in the Kontinental Hockey League (KHL) and the Kazakhstani national team.

He represented Kazakhstan at the 2021 IIHF World Championship.
