= Nikolas Ketner =

Czech ice hockey player

- Born: February 13, 1991 (age 34)
- Height: 6 ft 2 in (188 cm)
- Weight: 187 lb (85 kg; 13 st 5 lb)
- Position: Defence
- Shoots: Left
- Slovak Extraliga team: HC ’05 Banská Bystrica
- NHL draft: Undrafted
- Playing career: 2010–present

Nikolas Ketner (born February 13, 1991) is a Slovak professional ice hockey defenceman who played with HC Slovan Bratislava in the Slovak Extraliga during the 2010–11 season.
