= Pavel Akolzin =

Kazak ice hockey player (born 1990)

- Born: 25 November 1990 (age 35) Moscow, Russian SFSR, USSR
- Height: 6 ft 3 in (191 cm)
- Weight: 190 lb (86 kg; 13 st 8 lb)
- Position: Right wing
- Shoots: Left
- KHL team Former teams: Free agent Barys Nur-Sultan; Metallurg Magnitogorsk; SKA Saint Petersburg; Shanghai Dragons
- National team: Kazakhstan
- Playing career: 2007–present

Pavel Sergeevich Akolzin (Cyrillic: Павел Сергеевич Акользин; born 25 November 1990) is a Russian professional ice hockey player. He is currently an unrestricted free agent who most recently played under contract with the Shanghai Dragons in the Kontinental Hockey League (KHL).

== Playing career ==
Akolzin formerly played with Barys Nur-Sultan in the KHL and Beibarys Atyrau, Arlan Kokshetau and Nomad Astana of the Kazakhstan Hockey Championship.

Following four seasons in the KHL with Barys Nur-Sultan, Akolzin left the club as a free agent and was signed to a two-year contract to continue in the KHL with Russian club, Metallurg Magnitogorsk on 1 May 2021.

After a brief stint with SKA Saint Petersburg, Akolzin was signed to a two-year contract with newly rebranded club, Shanghai Dragons, on 15 August 2025.

== Career statistics ==
=== International ===
Year	Team	Event	Result	GP	G	A	Pts	PIM
2018	Kazakhstan	WC-D1	19th	5	1	0	1	6
2019	Kazakhstan	WC-D1	17th	5	1	0	1	2
2020	Kazakhstan	OGQ	DNQ	3	0	1	1	0
2021	Kazakhstan	WC	10th	7	1	0	1	2
2022	Kazakhstan	WC	14th	7	1	2	3	11
Senior totals				27	4	3	7	21

== Awards and honors ==
Award	Year
KHL
Gagarin Cup (Metallurg Magnitogorsk)	2024
