= 2021–22 Women's League season =

- League: Women's League
- Sport: Ice hockey
- Duration: 11 September 2021 – 27 February 2022
- Games: 75
- Teams: 6

Regular Season
- Season champions: ZSC Lions Frauen
- Top scorer: (United States) Sidney Morin (HC Ladies Lugano)

Women's League playoff champion
- Champions: ZSC Lions
- Runners-up: HC Ladies Lugano

Women's League seasons
- ← 2020–21 2022–23 →

The 2021–22 Swiss League season was the 36th ice hockey season of the Swiss Women's League.

== Teams ==
Swiss League teams for the 2021–22 season

Team	Trainer	City	Arena	Capacity
Ladies Team Lugano	Benjamin Rogger, Pasi Koppinen	Lugano	La Resega	7,200
HC Université Neuchâtel Dames	Yan Gigon, Mike Gosselin, Thierry Bourquin	Neuchâtel	Patinoire du Littoral	7,000
SC Reinach Damen	Sean Huber, Peter Küng, Urs Kleeb	Reinach	Kunsteisbahn Oberwynental	-
EV Bomo Thun	Thomas Zwahlen, Petra Melicherikova	Thun	Kunsteisbahn Grabengut	4,000
Hockey Team Thurgau Indien Ladies	Matthias Rehmann, Anja Stiefel	Kreuzlingen	Bodensee-Arena	4,300
ZSC Lions Frauen	Andrin Christen, Ramon Christen	Zürich	Kunsteisbahn Oerlikon	1,700

== Regular season ==
The regular season started on 11 September 2021 and ended on 27 February 2022. The regular season is played at the national level in the form of a round of five matches, that is to say that each of the six teams plays 25 matches. The first four in the ranking in the regular season compete in the playoffs (best of 5), the two last team compete in the playouts (best of 5). The Swiss SWHL-B champions will be promoted directly to the WL for the 2022/23 season. The SWHL-B runner-up plays a league qualifier against the loser of the WL playouts. If the SWHL-B champion does not wish to be promoted, the runner-up will be promoted directly and no WL member will be relegated. If SWHL-B champions and runners-up do not wish to be promoted, there will be no promotion or relegation from WL to SWHL-B. The 2021/22 match schedule is characterized by two interruptions. There will generally be no matches from December 7 to 21 due to the Winter Universiade in Lucerne. The WL will take a break from January 22 to February 20, 2022 due to the Olympic Games.

Pos	Team	Pld	W	OTW	OTL	L	GF	GA	GD	Pts	Qualification
1	ZSC Lions Frauen	25	19	1	3	2	95	35	+60	62	Advance to Playoffs
2	Ladies Team Lugano	25	14	4	2	5	103	43	+60	52	Advance to Playoffs
3	HC Université Neuchâtel Dames	25	14	0	0	11	67	68	−1	42	Advance to Playoffs
4	EV Bomo Thun	25	9	3	2	11	66	58	+8	35	Advance to Playoffs
5	Hockey Team Thurgau Indien Ladies	25	7	1	4	13	55	93	−38	27	
6	SC Reinach Damen	25	1	2	0	22	35	124	−89	7	

Rules for classification: 1) points; 2) a higher number of wins in the regular time; 3) a higher number of wins in overtime and shootouts; 4) goal difference; 5) number of goals scored; 6) drawing of lots.

=== Statistics ===
==== Scoring leaders ====
The following shows the top ten players who led the league in points, at the conclusion of the regular season. If two or more skaters are tied (i.e. same number of points, goals and played games), all of the tied skaters are shown.

Player	Team	GP	G	A	Pts	PIM
(United States) Sidney Morin	Ladies Team Lugano	25	20	38	58	2
(Switzerland) Dominique Rüegg	ZSC Lions Frauen	23	27	25	52	18
(Switzerland) Laura Zimmermann	EV Bomo Thun	25	21	18	39	40
(Sweden) Ronja Mogren	Ladies Team Lugano	25	22	16	38	20
(Canada) Coralie Larose	HC Université Neuchâtel Dames	25	20	12	32	14
(Switzerland) Sinja Leemann	ZSC Lions Frauen	23	13	19	32	8
(Switzerland) Nicole Bullo	Ladies Team Lugano	22	6	24	30	30
(Switzerland) Romy Eggimann	Ladies Team Lugano	22	12	16	28	8
(France) Betty Jouanny	EV Bomo Thun	24	9	19	28	8
(Switzerland) Stefanie Marty	EV Bomo Thun	22	15	11	26	12

==== Leading goaltenders ====
The following shows the top five goaltenders who led the league in goals against average, provided that they have played at least 40% of their team's minutes, at the conclusion of the regular season.

Player	Team(s)	GP	TOI	GA	GAA
(France) Caroline Baldin	ZSC Lions Frauen	22	1220	29	1,43
(Switzerland) Alexandra Lehmann	Ladies Team Lugano	11	667	18	1,62
(Switzerland) Sofia Decristophoris	Ladies Team Lugano	14	830	23	1,66
(Switzerland) Nina Paiva	HC Université Neuchâtel Dames	21	1151	41	2,14
(Switzerland) Sandy Heim	EV Bomo Thun	22	1296	52	2,41

== Playoffs ==
Due to the uncertain situation linked to the COVID-19 pandemic, the national cup final is postponed until after the Olympic Games. This postponement directly affects the first round of the playoffs, canceling the first weekend. The first round is therefore played to the best of 3, rather than the best of 5 as initially planned.

=== Bracket ===
Semi-finals (best-of-5)
1	ZSC Lions Frauen	2
4	EV Bomo Thun	0
2	Ladies Team Lugano	2
3	HC Université Neuchâtel Dames	0

Finals (best-of-5)
1	ZSC Lions Frauen	3
2	Ladies Team Lugano	0
Game for 3rd place (best-of-1)
3	HC Université Neuchâtel Dames	1
4	EV Bomo Thun	4

=== Semi-Finals ===
==== (1) ZSC Lions Frauen vs. (4) EV Bomo Thun ====
12 March	ZSC Lions Frauen	3-1	EV Bomo Thun	Kunsteisbahn Oerlikon, Zürich	Recap
No scoring		First period	No scoring
Leemann (Rüegg, S. Bachmann) - 26:40; Rüegg (Leemann, Hauser) - 33:47		Second period	No scoring
Rüedi (N. Bachmann, Frey) - 45:06		Third period	55:24 - Zimmermann (S. Marty)
Caroline Baldin		Goalie stats	Sandy Heim

13 March	EV Bomo Thun	2-4	ZSC Lions Frauen	Kunsteisbahn Grabengut, Thun	Recap
13:40 - Zimmermann (J. Marty, S. Marty) (PP1)		First period	Rüegg (Schlegel) - 10:14
No scoring		Second period	Rüegg (Leemann) - 33:22; Rüegg (Rüedi) - 39:34
53:39 - Rossel (Zimmermann) (SH1)		Third period	Hauser (EN) - 58:40
Sandy Heim		Goalie stats	Caroline Baldin

ZSC Lions Frauen won the series 2–0.

==== (2) Ladies Team Lugano vs. (3) HC Université Neuchâtel Dames ====
12 March	Ladies Team Lugano	5-3	HC Université Neuchâtel Dames	La Resega, Lugano	Recap
Morin - 16:48		First period	19:53 - Joray (Gendarme, Larose)
Morin (Bullo) (PP1) - 25:24; Desboeufs (Luraschi, Dalessi) - 26:35; Morin - 28:52		Second period	31:18 - Wood (Ryser, Larose) (PP2)
Mogren (Lutz, Morin) (PP1) - 58:36		Third period	45:03 - Joray (Ryser, Larose) (PP1)
Alexandra Lehmann		Goalie stats	Nina Paiva

13 March	HC Université Neuchâtel Dames	4-5	Ladies Team Lugano	Patinoire du Littoral, Neuchâtel	Recap
15:29 - Larose (Ryser); 16:52 - Ryser (Larose)		First period	No scoring
22:08 - Pélissou (Jobin, Dale) (PP1); 31:15 - Larose (Jobin)		Second period	Gaberell (Desboeufs, Lutz) - 35:01; Gaberell (Dalessi, Gianettoni) - 36:57; Mogren (Morin, Bullo) - 37:31
No scoring		Third period	Gaberell (Eggimann, Abatangelo) (PP1) - 42:37; Morin (Lutz) - 47:04
Nina Paiva		Goalie stats	Alexandra Lehmann; Sofia Decristophoris

Ladies Team Lugano won the series 2–0.

=== Game for 3rd place ===
19 March	HC Université Neuchâtel Dames	1-4	EV Bomo Thun	Patinoire du Littoral, Neuchâtel	Recap
No scoring		First period	1:07 - Gerber (Ujcik, Rensch)
No scoring		Second period	39:08 - Zimmermann (Jouanny)
Larose (Joray) (SH1) - 45:18		Third period	58:06 - Ujcik (Gerber); 58:17 - Zimmermann (Jouanny)
Nina Paiva		Goalie stats	Sandy Heim

EV Bomo Thun won the game and finish at the 3rd place.

=== Finals ===
19 March	ZSC Lions Frauen	5-1	Ladies Team Lugano	Kunsteisbahn Oerlikon, Zürich	Recap
No scoring		First period	No scoring
Rüedi (Frey, Marti) - 30:15; Marti (Grascher) - 31:48		Second period	33:51 - Morin (Desboeufs)
Schlegel (Leemann, Hauser) - 45:14; Rüegg (Frey, N. Bachmann) (PP1) - 57:31; Rüegg (Leemann, Schlegel) - 59:39		Third period	No scoring
Caroline Baldin		Goalie stats	Sofia Decristophoris

20 March	Ladies Team Lugano	2-5	ZSC Lions Frauen	La Resega, Lugano	Recap
2:44 - Desboeufs (Morin, Mogren) (PP1)		First period	Schlegel (Hauser, Rüegg) - 0:43; Leemann (Rüegg) (PP1) - 17:29; Schlegel (Christen, Hauser) - 18:57
25:52 - Desboeufs (Mogren, Bullo)		Second period	Leemann (SH1) - 37:51
No scoring		Third period	Leemann (Christen, Rüegg) (PP1) - 45:43
Alexandra Lehmann		Goalie stats	Caroline Baldin

26 March	ZSC Lions Frauen	4-3	Ladies Team Lugano	Kunsteisbahn Oerlikon, Zürich	Recap
Leemann (Rüegg, Schlegel) - 15:00; Leemann (Rüegg, Schlegel) - 16:03		First period	4:21 - Odermatt (Luraschi, Mogren); 13:11 - Lutz (Mogren)
Rüedi (Marti) - 39:18		Second period	25:02 - Desboeufs (Mogren)
Baechler (Christen, Rüedi) - 47:09		Third period	No scoring
Caroline Baldin		Goalie stats	Alexandra Lehmann

ZSC Lions Frauen won the series 3–0.

=== Team of Swiss champions ===
Goalkeepers: Caroline Baldin, Alisha Berger, Laura De Bastiani, Nadia Häner

Defense: Nele Bachmann, Alessia Baechler, Lara Christen, Tamara Grascher, Nina Harju, Janine Hauser, Aurela Thalmann

Offense: Sara Bachmann, Raschelle Bräm, Chiara Eggli, Mara Frey, Nora Harju, Naemi Herzig, Sinja Leemann, Renee Lendi, Alina Marti, Lisa Rüedi, Dominique Rüegg, Dominique Scheurer, Jessica Schlegel

Coaching: Andrin Christen, Ramon Christen

== Awards ==
- Most Valuable Player : Sidney Morin (Ladies Team Lugano)
- Best forward : Laura Zimmermann (EV Bomo Thun)
- Best defender : Sidney Morin and Nicole Bullo (Ladies Team Lugano)
- Best goalkeeper : Caroline Baldin (ZSC Lions Frauen)
- Best rookie : Laura Zimmermann (EV Bomo Thun)
- Best coach : Benjamin Rogger (Ladies Team Lugano)

== Play-outs ==
13 March	Hockey Team Thurgau Indien Ladies	3-2	SC Reinach Damen	Güttingersreuti, Weinfelden	Recap
No scoring		First period	19:39 - Kleeb (Waser, Maskalova)
No scoring		Second period	No scoring
Balzer (Staub, Merz) - 43:45; Grascher (Büchi) - 55:06; Rumanova (Zogg) - 55:09		Third period	44:24 - Christmann (Maskalova)
Caroline Lambert		Goalie stats	Jade Dübi

17 March	SC Reinach Damen	1-3	Hockey Team Thurgau Indien Ladies	Kunsteisbahn Oberwynental, Reinach	Recap
No scoring		First period	Rumanova - 0:16
33:13 - Waser (Maskalova)		Second period	No scoring
No scoring		Third period	Grascher (Büchi) - 52:44; Grascher (SH1) - 58:22
Jade Dübi		Goalie stats	Caroline Lambert

Hockey Team Thurgau Indien Ladies won the series 2–0.

Hockey Team Thurgau Indien Ladies saves its place in SWHL A by winning the Play-outs.

== Promotion/Relegation ==
Winning the SWHL-B championship, the HC Ambrì-Piotta Girls is promoted to SWHL-A. The finalist, SC Langenthal Ladies takes part in a qualifying round against SC Reinach Damen.

26 March	SC Reinach Damen	1-2	SC Langenthal Ladies	Kunsteisbahn Oberwynental, Reinach	Recap
Kleeb (Hofstetter, Waser) - 4:25		First period	No scoring
No scoring		Second period	No scoring
No scoring		Third period	42:54 - Allemann; 57:13 - Allemann (Kozuh)
Jade Dübi		Goalie stats	Caroline Spies

27 March	SC Langenthal Ladies	3-1	SC Reinach Damen	Schoren Halle, Langenthal	Recap
No scoring		First period	No scoring
28:34 - Hess; 34:54 - Brunner		Second period	Waser (Kleeb) - 26:43
59:02 - Cornova (EN)		Third period	No scoring
Caroline Spies		Goalie stats	Jade Dübi

SC Langenthal Ladies won the series 2–0.

SC Reinach Damen, losing to SC Langenthal Ladies, is relegated to SWHL-B. SC Reinach had been present in SWHL-A since 1996 and were champions 3 times between 2001 and 2003. On April 12, the Reinach club announced the dissolution of its women's team due to the departure of most of their players and sponsors.
