= 2023–24 Women's League season =

- League: Women's League
- Sport: Ice hockey
- Duration: 16 September 2023 – 25 February 2024
- Games: 104
- Teams: 8

Regular Season
- Season champions: SC Bern
- Top scorer: (France) Estelle Duvin (SC Bern)

Women's League playoff champion
- Champions: ZSC Lions
- Runners-up: SC Bern

Women's League seasons
- ← 2022–23 2024–25 →

The 2022–23 Women's League season was the 37th ice hockey season of the Swiss Women's League. The regular season was played from 16 September 2023 to 25 February 2024. SC Bern were the regular season champions.

In the playoffs, ZSC Lions claimed the twelfth Swiss Championship title in franchise history after beating SC Bern in the playoff finals.

== Teams ==
Winning the SWHL-B championship, the HC Fribourg-Gottéron Ladies is promoted to SWHL-A

The major Swiss hockey clubs are showing more and more interest in women's hockey. The EV Zug created a women's team with an impressive budget of 1.2 million CHF. The League authorizes them to take part in the SWHL-B championship. In response, SC Bern took EV Bomo Thun under its wing. SC Bern Frauen will now play at the PostFinance Arena. The HC Davos also agrees with the HC Thurgau to move its team from the Indians to the Eisstadion Davos, under the name HC Davos Ladies.

Swiss League teams for the 2023–24 season

Team	City	Arena	Head coach
HC Ambrì-Piotta Girls	Quinto	Nuova Valascia	Benjamin Rogger
SC Bern Frauen	Bern	PostFinance Arena	Thomas Zwahlen
HC Davos Ladies	Davos	Eisstadion Davos	Andrea Kröni
HC Fribourg-Gottéron Ladies	Fribourg	BCF Arena	Valentin Dufour
SC Langenthal Ladies	Langenthal	Schoren Halle	Jürg Langenegger
Ladies Team Lugano	Lugano	Cornèr Arena	Massimo Fedrizzi
HC Université Neuchâtel Dames	Neuchâtel	Patinoire du Littoral	Yan Gigon
ZSC Lions Frauen	Zürich	Kunsteisbahn Oerlikon	Angela Frautschi

== Regular season ==
The regular season started on 16 September 2023 and ended on 25 February 2024. The regular season is played at the national level in the form of a round of five matches, that is to say that each of the eight teams plays 28 matches. The first four in the ranking in the regular season compete in the playoffs (best of 5), the four last team compete in a ranking round. The Swiss SWHL-B champions will be promoted directly to the WL for the 2024/25 season. The SWHL-B runner-up plays a league qualifier against the loser of the WL ranking round. If the SWHL-B champion does not wish to be promoted, the runner-up will be promoted directly and no WL member will be relegated. If SWHL-B champions and runners-up do not wish to be promoted, there will be no promotion or relegation from WL to SWHL-B.

Pos	Team	Pld	W	OTW	OTL	L	GF	GA	GD	Pts	Qualification
1	SC Bern Frauen	28	23	1	1	3	139	47	+92	72	Advance to Playoffs
2	ZSC Lions Frauen	28	21	2	1	4	122	47	+75	68	Advance to Playoffs
3	HC Ambrì-Piotta Girls	28	19	1	1	7	123	66	+57	60	Advance to Playoffs
4	HC Université Neuchâtel Dames	28	13	1	2	12	86	82	+4	43	Advance to Playoffs
5	HC Davos Ladies	28	11	2	1	14	69	76	−7	38	Advance to Ranking Round
6	HC Fribourg-Gottéron Ladies	28	9	1	0	18	75	112	−37	29	Advance to Ranking Round
7	Ladies Team Lugano	28	5	0	2	21	45	150	−105	17	Advance to Ranking Round
8	SC Langenthal Ladies	28	3	0	0	25	27	106	−79	9	Advance to Ranking Round

Rules for classification: 1) points; 2) a higher number of wins in the regular time; 3) a higher number of wins in overtime and shootouts; 4) goal difference; 5) number of goals scored; 6) drawing of lots.

=== Statistics ===
==== Scoring leaders ====
The following shows the top ten players who led the league in points, at the conclusion of the regular season. If two or more skaters are tied (i.e. same number of points, goals and played games), all of the tied skaters are shown.

Player	Team	GP	G	A	Pts	PIM
(France) Estelle Duvin	SC Bern Frauen	28	35	32	67	18
(Finland) Maija Otamo	SC Bern Frauen	28	22	36	58	8
(Sweden) Fanny Rask	HC Ambrì-Piotta Girls	28	18	37	55	34
(Switzerland) Sinja Leemann	ZSC Lions Frauen	28	25	27	52	8
(United States) Theresa Knutson	HC Ambrì-Piotta Girls	28	30	19	49	6
(United States) Eleri MacKay	HC Fribourg-Gottéron Ladies	28	19	21	40	6
(Switzerland) Emma Ingold	SC Bern Frauen	28	15	21	36	8
(Switzerland) Romy Eggimann	HC Ambrì-Piotta Girls	27	19	16	35	34
(Finland) Jenna Suokko	SC Bern Frauen	27	16	16	32	37
(Finland) Jenna Kaila	HC Ambrì-Piotta Girls	25	21	10	31	12

==== Leading goaltenders ====
The following shows the top five goaltenders who led the league in goals against average, provided that they have played at least 40% of their team's minutes, at the conclusion of the regular season.

Player	Team(s)	GP	TOI	GA	GAA
(Switzerland) Sandy Heim	ZSC Lions Frauen	16	824	17	1,24
(Switzerland) Alexandra Lehmann	SC Bern Frauen	14	787	18	1,37
(Switzerland) Laura De Bastiani	ZSC Lions Frauen	17	864	27	1,88
(Switzerland) Saskia Maurer	SC Bern Frauen	15	864	27	1,88
(Switzerland) Sofia Decristophoris	HC Ambrì-Piotta Girls	23	1363	46	2,03

== Playoffs ==
=== Bracket ===
Semi-finals (best-of-5)
1	SC Bern Frauen	3
4	HC Université Neuchâtel Dames	0
2	ZSC Lions Frauen	3
3	HC Ambrì-Piotta Girls	1

Finals (best-of-5)
1	SC Bern Frauen	2
2	ZSC Lions Frauen	3
Game for 3rd place (best-of-1)
3	HC Ambrì-Piotta Girls	5
4	HC Université Neuchâtel Dames	4

=== Semi-Finals ===
==== (1) SC Bern Frauen vs. (4) HC Université Neuchâtel Dames ====
2 March	SC Bern Frauen	4-0	HC Université Neuchâtel Dames	PostFinance Arena, Bern	Recap
Allemann (Ryser, Rossel) - 3:44		First period	No scoring
Duvin (Ingold, Suokko) (PP1) - 25:07		Second period	No scoring
Ingold (Duvin, Aymon) - 40:23; Duvin (PS) - 56:26		Third period	No scoring
Saskia Maurer		Goalie stats	Nina Paiva

3 March	HC Université Neuchâtel Dames	1-4	SC Bern Frauen	Patinoire du Littoral, Neuchâtel	Recap
No scoring		First period	Otamo (Aymon) - 0:22; Christen (Allemann) - 9:29
No scoring		Second period	Suokko (Rossel, Joray) (PP1) - 37:50
50:55 - Bourquin (Fornasier, Bargo Cuns)		Third period	Pélissou (Otamo) - 42:49
Nina Paiva		Goalie stats	Saskia Maurer

9 March	SC Bern Frauen	2-1	HC Université Neuchâtel Dames	PostFinance Arena, Bern	Recap
Suokko (Joray, S. Marty) - 14:12		First period	No scoring
Otamo (Duvin) - 32:52		Second period	32:23 - Fornasier (Brauen)
No scoring		Third period	No scoring
Saskia Maurer		Goalie stats	Nina Paiva

SC Bern Frauen won the series 3–0.

==== (2) ZSC Lions Frauen vs. (3) HC Ambrì-Piotta Girls ====
2 March	ZSC Lions Frauen	1-3	HC Ambrì-Piotta Girls	Kunsteisbahn Oerlikon, Zürich	Recap
No scoring		First period	No scoring
No scoring		Second period	No scoring
Rüedi (Scheurer, Lendi) - 58:21		Third period	42:24 - Luraschi (Holmgren, Andenmatten); 51:37 - Kaila (Knutson, Rask) (PP1); 53:51 - Kaila (Knutson, Rask) (PP2)
Sandy Heim		Goalie stats	Sofia Decristophoris

3 March	HC Ambrì-Piotta Girls	1-2	OT	ZSC Lions Frauen	Nuova Valascia, Quinto	Recap
No scoring		First period		Baechler (Leemann) - 15:19
No scoring		Second period		No scoring
41:32 - Knutson (Kaila, Montalbetti)		Third period		No scoring
No scoring		First overtime period		Baechler (Rüedi) - 61:29
Sofia Decristophoris		Goalie stats		Sandy Heim

9 March	ZSC Lions Frauen	5-2	HC Ambrì-Piotta Girls	Kunsteisbahn Oerlikon, Zürich	Recap
Rüedi (Scheurer) - 16:38		First period	No scoring
Marti (Lendi) - 22:48; Baechler (Rüedi) - 35:08		Second period	34:37 - Merz (Andenmatten, Holmgren); 36:31 - Rask (Knutson) (PP1)
Kontny (Harju, Thalmann) - 45:51; Kontny - 51:43		Third period	No scoring
Sandy Heim		Goalie stats	Sofia Decristophoris

10 March	HC Ambrì-Piotta Girls	0-3	ZSC Lions Frauen	Nuova Valascia, Quinto	Recap
No scoring		First period	No scoring
No scoring		Second period	Baechler (Rüedi) (PP1) - 28:30
No scoring		Third period	Marti - 58:15; Leemann (Rüedi) (EN) - 59:43
Sofia Decristophoris		Goalie stats	Sandy Heim

ZSC Lions Frauen won the series 3–1.

=== Game for 3rd place ===
17 March	HC Ambrì-Piotta Girls	5-4	OT	HC Université Neuchâtel Dames	Nuova Valascia, Quinto	Recap
Rask (Luraschi, Eggimann) - 3:36; Eggimann (Rask) - 5:44		First period		1:10 - Kunz (Carpenter-Boesch, Gilomen)
Rask (Desboeufs) - 26:01; Kaila (Knutson, Holmgren) (SH1) - 31:50		Second period		No scoring
No scoring		Third period		41:37 - Bourquin (Menoud, Fornasier); 49:54 - Guerriero (Carpenter-Boesch) (PP1); 57:40 - Truax (Kunz)
Eggimann (Rask, Kaila) (PP1) - 75:06		First overtime period		No scoring
Sofia Decristophoris		Goalie stats		Nina Paiva

HC Ambrì-Piotta Girls won the game and finish at the 3rd place.

=== Finals ===
16 March	SC Bern Frauen	2-3	OT	ZSC Lions Frauen	PostFinance Arena, Bern	Recap
Otamo (Duvin) - 8:40		First period		No scoring
Otamo (Duvin) - 33:47		Second period		25:44 - Bachmann (Rüedi, Scheurer); 34:11 - Lendi (Marti)
No scoring		Third period		No scoring
No scoring		First overtime period		64:00 - Leemann (PS)
Saskia Maurer		Goalie stats		Sandy Heim

17 March	ZSC Lions Frauen	1-2	SC Bern Frauen	Kunsteisbahn Oerlikon, Zürich	Recap
2:09 - Thalmann		First period	No scoring
No scoring		Second period	No scoring
No scoring		Third period	Christen (PP1) - 54:04 Ingold (Allemann) - 55:19
Sandy Heim		Goalie stats	Saskia Maurer

20 March	SC Bern Frauen	1-2	ZSC Lions Frauen	PostFinance Arena, Bern	Recap
No scoring		First period	No scoring
Rossel (Suokko, Duvin) - 39:59		Second period	30:05 - Sigrist (Fontaine) (PP1); 36:15 - Leemann (Marti, Lendi)
No scoring		Third period	No scoring
Saskia Maurer		Goalie stats	Sandy Heim

23 March	ZSC Lions Frauen	0-1	SC Bern Frauen	Kunsteisbahn Oerlikon, Zürich	Recap
No scoring		First period	Otamo (Pélissou, Duvin) - 2:46
No scoring		Second period	No scoring
No scoring		Third period	No scoring
Sandy Heim		Goalie stats	Saskia Maurer

24 March	SC Bern Frauen	0-3	ZSC Lions Frauen	PostFinance Arena, Bern	Recap
No scoring		First period	3:17 - Schaefer (Fontaine)
No scoring		Second period	39:47 - Scheurer (Baechler, Rüedi)
No scoring		Third period	44:38 - Rüedi (Baechler) (PP1)
Saskia Maurer		Goalie stats	Sandy Heim

ZSC Lions Frauen won the series 3–2.

=== Team of Swiss champions ===
Goalkeepers: Laura De Bastiani, Sandy Heim

Defense: Alessia Baechler, Christine Deaudelin, Skylar Fontaine, Zoé Mächler, Jana Peter, Shannon Sigrist, Aurela Thalmann

Offense: Jil Aschwanden, Sara Bachmann, Mara Frey, Nora Harju, Kristina Kontny, Tereza Lahova, Sinja Leemann, Renee Lendi, Alina Marti, Lisa Rüedi, Vanessa Schaefer, Dominique Scheurer

Coaching: Angela Frautschi, Cyndy Kenyon

== Awards ==
- Most Valuable Player : Estelle Duvin (SC Bern Frauen)
- Best forward : Estelle Duvin (SC Bern Frauen) and Fanny Rask (HC Ambrì-Piotta Girls)
- Best defender : Josefine Holmgren (HC Ambrì-Piotta Girls)
- Best goalkeeper : Saskia Maurer (SC Bern Frauen)
- Best rookie : Leoni Balzer (HC Davos Ladies)
- Best coach : Thomas Zwahlen (SC Bern Frauen)

== Ranking Round ==
Pos	Team	Pld	W	OTW	OTL	L	GF	GA	GD	Pts	Qualification
1	HC Davos Ladies	6	5	0	0	1	22	9	+13	15	Saison Ended
2	HC Fribourg-Gottéron Ladies	6	5	0	0	1	33	9	+24	15	Saison Ended
3	SC Langenthal Ladies	6	2	0	0	4	16	17	−1	6	Saison Ended
4	Ladies Team Lugano	6	0	0	0	6	1	37	−36	0	Advance to Relegation round

Rules for classification: 1) points; 2) a higher number of wins in the regular time; 3) a higher number of wins in overtime and shootouts; 4) goal difference; 5) number of goals scored; 6) drawing of lots.

The Ladies Team Lugano, after having recorded numerous departures at the start of this season, has experienced a lot of difficulty during this season. Finishing last in the championship with a very limited contingent, the leaders preferred to give up playing in the relegation round and accepted being relegated to the green carpet. The champion of the SWHL-B, the EV Zug Women therefore advances to the SWHL-A.
