= 2018–19 SWHL A season =

- League: Swiss Women's Hockey League A
- Sport: Ice hockey
- Duration: 15 September 2018 – 2 February 2019
- Games: 60
- Teams: 6

Regular Season
- Season Champions: Ladies Team Lugano
- Top scorer: (Switzerland) Phoebe Stänz

SWHL A playoff champion
- Champions: Ladies Team Lugano
- Runners-up: ZSC Lions Frauen

Swiss Women's Hockey League A seasons
- ← 2017–18 2019–20 →

The 2018–19 SWHL A season was the 33rd ice hockey season of the Swiss Women's Hockey League A (SWHL A).

== Teams ==
Swiss League teams for the 2018–19 season

Team	Trainer	City	Arena	Capacity
Ladies Team Lugano	Steve Huard, Nenad Ilic	Lugano	La Resega	7,200
HC Université Neuchâtel Dames	Yan Gigon, Thierry Bourquin	Neuchâtel	Patinoire du Littoral	7,000
SC Reinach Damen	Melanie Häfliger, Simon Theiler	Reinach	Kunsteisbahn Oberwynental	-
EV Bomo Thun	Bruno Allemann	Thun	Kunsteisbahn Grabengut	4,000
SC Weinfelden Ladies	Andrea Kröni	Weinfelden	Güttingersreuti	3,100
ZSC Lions Frauen	Georg Taferner, Diane Michaud	Zürich	Kunsteisbahn Oerlikon	1,700

== Regular season ==
The regular season started on 15 September 2018 and ended on 2 February 2019. The SWHL A game mode provides a preliminary round (phase 1) with 10 matches per team and a Masterround with 10 additional matches per team. The top 4 teams qualify for the playoffs and the bottom two compete for a play-off against relegation. The loser must face the SWHLB champion.

Pos	Team	Pld	W	OTW	OTL	L	GF	GA	GD	Pts	Qualification
1	Ladies Team Lugano	20	16	2	1	1	131	41	+90	53	Advance to Playoffs
2	SC Reinach Damen	20	13	1	1	5	89	45	+44	42	Advance to Playoffs
3	ZSC Lions Frauen	20	12	0	3	5	67	47	+20	39	Advance to Playoffs
4	HC Université Neuchâtel Dames	20	8	1	1	10	54	56	−2	27	Advance to Playoffs
5	EV Bomo Thun	20	3	1	1	15	22	100	−78	12	
6	SC Weinfelden Ladies	20	1	2	0	17	32	106	−74	7	

Rules for classification: 1) points; 2) a higher number of wins in the regular time; 3) a higher number of wins in overtime and shootouts; 4) goal difference; 5) number of goals scored; 6) drawing of lots.

=== Statistics ===
==== Scoring leaders ====
The following shows the top ten players who led the league in points, at the conclusion of the regular season. If two or more skaters are tied (i.e. same number of points, goals and played games), all of the tied skaters are shown.

Player	Team	GP	G	A	Pts	PIM
(Switzerland) Phoebe Stänz	Ladies Team Lugano	19	30	22	52	10
(Switzerland) Romy Eggimann	Ladies Team Lugano	20	19	31	50	16
(United States) Kate Leary	Ladies Team Lugano	20	33	16	49	16
(Switzerland) Rahel Enzler	SC Reinach Damen	20	23	24	47	6
(Switzerland) Evelina Raselli	SC Reinach Damen	19	18	16	34	30
(Switzerland) Dominique Rüegg	ZSC Lions Frauen	20	22	9	31	18
(Switzerland) Ophélie Ryser	Ladies Team Lugano	20	20	7	27	14
(Czech Republic) Simona Grascher	HC Université Neuchâtel Dames	20	15	12	27	20
(Switzerland) Noemi Ryhner	SC Reinach Damen	20	15	10	25	16
(Switzerland) Nina Waidacher	ZSC Lions Frauen	18	9	16	25	28

==== Leading goaltenders ====
The following shows the top five goaltenders who led the league in goals against average, provided that they have played at least 40% of their team's minutes, at the conclusion of the regular season.

Player	Team(s)	GP	TOI	GA	GAA
(Switzerland) Jade Dübi	Ladies Team Lugano	19	1147	39	2,04
(France) Caroline Baldin	ZSC Lions Frauen	19	1101	39	2,13
(Switzerland) Nina Paiva	HC Université Neuchâtel Dames	19	1102	49	2,67
(Switzerland) Laura De Bastiani	SC Reinach Damen	13	721	35	2,91
(France) Caroline Lambert	SC Weinfelden Ladies	18	987	95	5,78

== Playoffs ==
=== Bracket ===
Semi-finals (best-of-5)
1	Ladies Team Lugano	3
4	HC Université Neuchâtel Dames	1
2	SC Reinach Damen	1
3	ZSC Lions Frauen	3

Finals (best-of-5)
1	Ladies Team Lugano	3
3	ZSC Lions Frauen	0
Game for 3rd place (best-of-1)
2	SC Reinach Damen	1
4	HC Université Neuchâtel Dames	7

=== Semi-Finals ===
==== (1) Ladies Team Lugano vs. (4) HC Université Neuchâtel Dames ====
16 February	Ladies Team Lugano	3-0	HC Université Neuchâtel Dames	La Resega, Lugano	Recap
Gianettoni (Eggimann, Stänz) (PP2) - 17:41		First period	No scoring
Ryser (Eggimann, Leary) - 39:49		Second period	No scoring
Stänz (Leary) (SH1) - 50:17		Third period	No scoring
Jade Dübi		Goalie stats	Nina Paiva

17 February	HC Université Neuchâtel Dames	1-4	Ladies Team Lugano	Patinoire du Littoral, Neuchâtel	Recap
15:56 - Desvignes (SH1)		First period	Leary - 11:23
No scoring		Second period	Ryser (Escudero, Desboeufs) - 22:06; Stänz (Leary) - 23:01; Escudero (Stänz) - 36:51
No scoring		Third period	No scoring
Nina Paiva		Goalie stats	Giulia Mazzocchi

23 February	Ladies Team Lugano	1-2	HC Université Neuchâtel Dames	La Resega, Lugano	Recap
No scoring		First period	No scoring
Eggimann (Escudero, Bullo) - 34:19		Second period	32:53 - Grascher (Steele); 34:56 - Steele (Jobin)
No scoring		Third period	No scoring
Jade Dübi; Giulia Mazzocchi		Goalie stats	Nina Paiva

24 February	HC Université Neuchâtel Dames	0-4	Ladies Team Lugano	Patinoire du Littoral, Neuchâtel	Recap
No scoring		First period	Leary (PP1) - 3:15
No scoring		Second period	Stänz (Leary) - 28:10
No scoring		Third period	Stänz (Vallario) - 52:27; Escudero (Orlandini) - 57:30
Nina Paiva		Goalie stats	Jade Dübi

Ladies Team Lugano won the series 3–1.

==== (2) SC Reinach Damen vs. (3) ZSC Lions Frauen ====
16 February	SC Reinach Damen	4-5	ZSC Lions Frauen	Kunsteisbahn Oberwynental, Reinach	Recap
10:02 - R. Bräm (Enzler) (PP1)		First period	No scoring
32:41 - Kleeb (Enzler); 37:11 - Enzler (Bräm)		Second period	No scoring
53:32 - Raselli (Enzler)		Third period	Neuenschwander (Schlegel) - 41:57; Hochuli (Christen) - 48:54; Rüegg (N. Waidacher, M. Waidacher) - 53:09; Zimmermann (Fäsch) - 56:24; Hauser (Rüedi, Neuenschwander) (PP1) - 57:53
Vanessa Bolinger		Goalie stats	Caroline Baldin

17 February	ZSC Lions Frauen	1-3	SC Reinach Damen	Kunsteisbahn Oerlikon, Zürich	Recap
No scoring		First period	C. Bräm (Ryhner) (PP1) - 7:45; C. Bräm (R. Bräm) (PP1) - 12:06
25:26 - N. Waidacher (Punnett)		Second period	No scoring
No scoring		Third period	Kleeb (Enzler) - 44:31
Caroline Baldin		Goalie stats	Vanessa Bolinger

23 February	SC Reinach Damen	2-3	2OT	ZSC Lions Frauen	Kunsteisbahn Oberwynental, Reinach	Recap
No scoring		First period		18:10 - N. Waidacher (Zollinger, M. Waidacher)
No scoring		Second period		No scoring
Enzler (PS) - 58:21; Ryhner (Raselli, C. Bräm) - 59:52		Third period		45:55 - Schlegel (PP1)
No scoring		Second overtime period		Shootout - Rüedi (PS); Shootout - Rüegg (PS)
Vanessa Bolinger		Goalie stats		Caroline Baldin

24 February	ZSC Lions Frauen	2-1	OT	SC Reinach Damen	Kunsteisbahn Oerlikon, Zürich	Recap
No scoring		First period		No scoring
22:37 - Neuenschwander (Schlegel, Benz)		Second period		Raselli (Enzler, C. Bräm) - 28:04
No scoring		Third period		No scoring
74:09 - Rüegg (Punnett)		First overtime period		No scoring
Caroline Baldin		Goalie stats		Vanessa Bolinger

ZSC Lions Frauen won the series 3–1.

=== Game for 3rd place ===
3 March	SC Reinach Damen	1-7	HC Université Neuchâtel Dames	Kunsteisbahn Oberwynental, Reinach	Recap
C. Bräm (Enzler) (PP1) - 4:48		First period	6:10 - Grascher (Joray, Graf); 10:58 - Graf (Broad); 12:28 - Grascher (Joray)
No scoring		Second period	27:03 - Joray (Broad); 29:11 - Grascher (Gremaud); 30:08 - Grascher (Desvignes)
No scoring		Third period	53:02 - Jobin (Grascher, Steele)
Laura De Bastiani; Vanessa Bolinger		Goalie stats	Nina Paiva

HC Université Neuchâtel Dames won the game and finish at the 3rd place.

=== Finals ===
2 March	Ladies Team Lugano	5-2	ZSC Lions Frauen	La Resega, Lugano	Recap
Leary (Stänz) - 10:31		First period	0:49 - Rüegg (N. Waidacher)
No scoring		Second period	21:36 - Rüedi (Rüegg)
Escudero (Stänz, Desboeufs) - 45:22; Escudero (Vallario) - 46:54; Desboeufs (Stänz) - 52:00; Leary (Stänz) (EN) - 59:38		Third period	No scoring
Giulia Mazzocchi		Goalie stats	Caroline Baldin

3 March	ZSC Lions Frauen	2-4	Ladies Team Lugano	Kunsteisbahn Oerlikon, Zürich	Recap
6:25 - Zimmermann (Fäsch, Hochuli)		First period	Eggimann (Stänz, Poletti) - 9:45
No scoring		Second period	Eggimann (Leary, Bullo) - 30:14; Leary (Eggimann) - 34:43; Eggimann (Stänz) (PP1) - 35:55
46:53 - M. Waidacher (N. Waidacher)		Third period	No scoring
Caroline Baldin		Goalie stats	Giulia Mazzocchi

9 March	Ladies Team Lugano	4-1	ZSC Lions Frauen	La Resega, Lugano	Recap
No scoring		First period	No scoring
26:26 - Desboeufs (Stänz); 36:47 - Poletti (Desboeufs)		Second period	Schlegel (Rüedi) (PP1) - 21:24
45:04 - Stänz (Bullo, Leary) (PP1); 59:57 - Leary		Third period	No scoring
Jade Dübi		Goalie stats	Caroline Baldin

Ladies Team Lugano won the series 3–0.

=== Team of Swiss champions ===
Goalkeepers: Jade Dübi, Giulia Mazzocchi

Defense: Nicole Bullo, Jasmine Fedulov, Federica Galtieri, Nicla Gianettoni, Emma Montalbetti, Gaia Mottis, Anneke Orlandini, Lisa Poletti, Nicole Vallario

Offense: Nicole Andenmatten, Laura Desboeufs, Romy Eggimann, Lara Escudero, Kate Leary, Alicia Pagnamenta, Ophélie Ryser, Phoebe Stänz

Coaching: Nenad Ilic

== Play-outs ==
16 February	EV Bomo Thun	3-4	SC Weinfelden Ladies	Kunsteisbahn Grabengut, Thun	Recap
Brand (Schranz, Hänggi) - 3:22; Buxman (Gerber, Schranz) - 17:28		First period	18:20 - Michielin (Leemann)
No scoring		Second period	28:10 - Müller; 32:53 - Stejskal (Krause); 39:38 - Confidenti (Ehrbar, Michielin)
Buxman (L. Ingold) - 58:00		Third period	No scoring
Saskia Maurer		Goalie stats	Caroline Lambert

17 February	SC Weinfelden Ladies	3-2	EV Bomo Thun	Güttingersreuti, Weinfelden	Recap
16:21 - Müller (Wetli, Gianola) (PP1)		First period	No scoring
29:29 - Confidenti		Second period	Schranz (S. Minder) (PP1) - 23:08
49:18 - Müller (Stejskal)		Third period	Gerber - 42:21
Caroline Lambert		Goalie stats	Caroline Spies

23 February	EV Bomo Thun	6-1	SC Weinfelden Ladies	Kunsteisbahn Grabengut, Thun	Recap
Bachmann (Schranz) - 17:30		First period	2:14 - Confidenti
Zimmermann (L. Ingold) (SH1) - 24:34; Buxman (Schranz) - 26:59; Schranz (Buxman) - 30:09; Spiess (Brand) - 35:12		Second period	No scoring
Brand (E. Ingold) (PP1) - 56:23		Third period	No scoring
Saskia Maurer		Goalie stats	Caroline Lambert

24 February	SC Weinfelden Ladies	4-2	EV Bomo Thun	Güttingersreuti, Weinfelden	Recap
6:00 - Confidenti (Gianola) (PP1); 7:12 - Confidenti (Michielin); 8:34 - Michielin (Gianola)		First period	Zimmermann (Gerber) - 3:05; Buxman (Gerber, Schranz) (PP1) - 11:57
No scoring		Second period	No scoring
46:35 - Lötscher (Confidenti, Ruh)		Third period	No scoring
Caroline Lambert		Goalie stats	Caroline Spies

SC Weinfelden Ladies won the series 3–1.

SC Weinfelden Ladies saves its place in SWHL A by winning the Play-outs.

== Promotion/Relegation ==
16 March	SC Brandis Ladies	1-4	EV Bomo Thun	Sportbetriebe Brünnli, Hasle bei Burgdorf	Recap
17:21 - Melicherikova (M. Hofmann) (PP1)		First period	E. Ingold (Gerber) - 11:33; Zimmermann (N. Minder) - 12:01
No scoring		Second period	Zimmermann (N. Minder, S. Minder) - 36:22
No scoring		Third period	Schranz (EN) - 59:35
Jeannine Bürki; Franziska Walther		Goalie stats	Saskia Maurer

17 March	SC Brandis Ladies	8-1	EV Bomo Thun	Sportbetriebe Brünnli, Hasle bei Burgdorf	Recap
No scoring		First period	Zimmermann (S. Minder) (PP1) - 19:53
26:49 - Melicherikova		Second period	Spiess (S. Minder) (PP1) - 29:44; Schranz - 31:44; Brand (S. Minder) - 35:25; Zimmermann (Bachmann) - 37:06
No scoring		Third period	L. Ingold (Zimmermann) - 48:29; Buxman (S. Minder, Schranz) - 48:53; Zimmermann - 50:40
Dunja Fasel; Sandy Aebi		Goalie stats	Saskia Maurer; Caroline Spies

EV Bomo Thun won the series 2–0.
