= 2020–21 Women's League season =

- League: Women's League
- Sport: Ice hockey
- Duration: 26 September 2020 – 21 February 2021
- Games: 60
- Teams: 6

Regular Season
- Season champions: ZSC Lions
- Season MVP: (Finland) Michelle Karvinen (HC Ladies Lugano)
- Top scorer: (Finland) Michelle Karvinen (49 pts)

Women's League playoff champion
- Champions: HC Ladies Lugano
- Runners-up: ZSC Lions

Women's League seasons
- ← 2019–20 2021–22 →

The 2020–21 Women's League season was the 35th ice hockey season of the Swiss Women's League.

== Rules ==
The game mode of the Women's League provides for qualification with 20 games per team. The teams in places 1 to 4 then play play-offs with semi-finals, finals (both in best-of-five mode) and a game for third place. The teams in places 5 and 6 compete in a playout round (best-of -Five) the participant in the league relegation between the Women's League and SWHL B. Due to the interruption of qualification, the relegations between the leagues of the Regio League were suspended.

== Teams ==
Swiss League teams for the 2020–21 season

Team	Trainer	City	Arena	Capacity
Ladies Team Lugano	Pasi Koppinen, Vasco Soldini	Lugano	La Resega	7,200
HC Université Neuchâtel Dames	Yan Gigon, Thierry Bourquin	Neuchâtel	Patinoire du Littoral	7,000
SC Reinach Damen	Sean Huber	Reinach	Kunsteisbahn Oberwynental	-
EV Bomo Thun	Jakob Kölliker / Björn Schärer, Petra Melicherikova	Thun	Kunsteisbahn Grabengut	4,000
Hockey Team Thurgau Indien Ladies	Matthias Rehmann, Anja Stiefel	Kreuzlingen	Bodensee-Arena	4,300
ZSC Lions Frauen	Andrin Christen, Ramon Christen	Zürich	Kunsteisbahn Oerlikon	1,700

== Regular season ==
The regular season started on 26 September 2020 and ended on 21 February 2021. The SWHL A game mode provides a preliminary round (phase 1) with 10 matches per team and a Masterround with 10 additional matches per team. The top 4 teams qualify for the playoffs and the bottom two compete for a play-off against relegation. The loser must face the SWHLB champion.

Pos	Team	Pld	W	OTW	OTL	L	GF	GA	GD	Pts	Qualification
1	ZSC Lions Frauen	20	15	2	1	2	78	24	+54	50	Advance to Playoffs
2	Ladies Team Lugano	20	14	0	1	5	89	51	+38	43	Advance to Playoffs
3	Hockey Team Thurgau Indien Ladies	20	11	0	1	8	70	48	+22	34	Advance to Playoffs
4	EV Bomo Thun	20	7	3	0	10	62	77	−15	27	Advance to Playoffs
5	HC Université Neuchâtel Dames	20	5	1	1	13	38	66	−28	18	
6	SC Reinach Damen	20	2	0	2	16	36	107	−71	8	

Rules for classification: 1) points; 2) a higher number of wins in the regular time; 3) a higher number of wins in overtime and shootouts; 4) goal difference; 5) number of goals scored; 6) drawing of lots.

=== Statistics ===
==== Scoring leaders ====
The following shows the top ten players who led the league in points, at the conclusion of the regular season. If two or more skaters are tied (i.e. same number of points, goals and played games), all of the tied skaters are shown.

Player	Team	GP	G	A	Pts	PIM
(Finland) Michelle Karvinen	Ladies Team Lugano	16	27	22	49	20
(Switzerland) Phoebe Stänz	Hockey Team Thurgau Indien Ladies	18	23	14	37	18
(Switzerland) Evelina Raselli	Ladies Team Lugano	20	14	19	33	32
(Czech Republic) Simona Grascher	Hockey Team Thurgau Indien Ladies	20	18	14	32	8
(Switzerland) Noemi Ryhner	Ladies Team Lugano	18	13	19	32	2
(Switzerland) Laura Zimmermann	EV Bomo Thun	20	22	2	24	46
(Slovakia) Viktoria Maskalova	EV Bomo Thun	20	8	12	20	8
(Poland) Kamila Wieczorek	EV Bomo Thun	20	12	7	19	20
(Switzerland) Isabel Waidacher	ZSC Lions Frauen	11	8	11	19	14
(Switzerland) Lisa Rüedi	ZSC Lions Frauen	18	8	10	18	30

==== Leading goaltenders ====
The following shows the top five goaltenders who led the league in goals against average, provided that they have played at least 40% of their team's minutes, at the conclusion of the regular season.

Player	Team(s)	GP	TOI	GA	GAA
(France) Caroline Baldin	ZSC Lions Frauen	15	809	12	0,89
(Switzerland) Janine Alder	Hockey Team Thurgau Indien Ladies	16	943	38	2,42
(Switzerland) Nina Paiva	HC Université Neuchâtel Dames	19	1111	60	3,24
(Italy) Giulia Mazzocchi	Ladies Team Lugano	11	663	36	3,26
(Switzerland) Sandy Heim	EV Bomo Thun	12	728	40	3,30

== Playoffs ==
=== Bracket ===
Semi-finals (best-of-5)
1	ZSC Lions Frauen	3
4	EV Bomo Thun	0
2	Ladies Team Lugano	3
3	Hockey Team Thurgau Indien Ladies	1

Finals (best-of-5)
2	Ladies Team Lugano	3
1	ZSC Lions Frauen	1
Game for 3rd place (best-of-1)
3	Hockey Team Thurgau Indien Ladies	3
4	EV Bomo Thun	0

=== Semi-Finals ===
==== (1) ZSC Lions Frauen vs. (4) EV Bomo Thun ====
27 February	ZSC Lions Frauen	1-0	EV Bomo Thun	Kunsteisbahn Oerlikon, Zürich	Recap
No scoring		First period	No scoring
Christen (Marti, Scheurer) - 34:01		Second period	No scoring
No scoring		Third period	No scoring
Caroline Baldin		Goalie stats	Saskia Maurer

28 February	EV Bomo Thun	1-2	OT	ZSC Lions Frauen	Kunsteisbahn Grabengut, Thun	Recap
10:39 - Schranz (Minder, Zimmermann) (PP1)		First period		No scoring
No scoring		Second period		Shashkina (Waidacher, Lasis) (PP2) - 38:57
No scoring		Third period		No scoring
No scoring		First overtime period		Lasis (Rüedi, Waidacher) (PP1) - 63:05
Saskia Maurer		Goalie stats		Caroline Baldin

6 March	ZSC Lions Frauen	5-0	EV Bomo Thun	Kunsteisbahn Oerlikon, Zürich	Recap
Scheurer - 15:49; Grascher (Schlegel, Thalmann) (PP1) - 19:45		First period	No scoring
Waidacher (Baechler, Hauser) (SH1) - 32:48		Second period	No scoring
Rüedi (Lasis) (PP2) - 55:20; Rüedi (Zimmermann) (PP1) - 59:59		Third period	No scoring
Caroline Baldin		Goalie stats	Saskia Maurer

ZSC Lions Frauen won the series 3–0.

==== (2) Ladies Team Lugano vs. (3) Hockey Team Thurgau Indien Ladies ====
27 February	Ladies Team Lugano	4-3	OT	Hockey Team Thurgau Indien Ladies	La Resega, Lugano	Recap
Karvinen - 12:38		First period		14:29 - Stänz
No scoring		Second period		No scoring
Moy (Karvinen, Raselli) - 40:40; Moy (Karvinen, Raselli) - 42:27		Third period		45:09 - Grascher (Vallario, Stänz); 48:38 - Grascher
Karvinen (Moy, Raselli) (PP1) - 65:50		First overtime period		No scoring
Alexandra Lehmann		Goalie stats		Roxanne Kis

28 February	Hockey Team Thurgau Indien Ladies	2-3	Ladies Team Lugano	Güttingersreuti, Weinfelden	Recap
No scoring		First period	No scoring
33:46 - Stänz (Grascher) (SH1)		Second period	Eggimann (Ryhner, Orlandini) - 25:45
40:41 - Grascher (Stänz, Kutzer)		Third period	Desboeufs (Moy) - 44:50; Karvinen (Poletti, Ryhner) - 45:30
Janine Alder		Goalie stats	Alexandra Lehmann

6 March	Ladies Team Lugano	1-2	Hockey Team Thurgau Indien Ladies	La Resega, Lugano	Recap
Stocker (Raselli) - 4:39		First period	No scoring
No scoring		Second period	No scoring
No scoring		Third period	42:35 - Grascher (Wetli, Stänz); 57:42 - Michielin (Stiefel)
Alexandra Lehmann		Goalie stats	Janine Alder

7 March	Hockey Team Thurgau Indien Ladies	3-5	Ladies Team Lugano	Güttingersreuti, Weinfelden	Recap
10:57 - Vallario		First period	Eggimann (Abatangelo) - 10:29
No scoring		Second period	Ryhner (Raselli, Karvinen) - 39:37
43:12 - Stänz; 48:07 - Merz (Michielin)		Third period	Poletti (Ryhner, Raselli) - 52:56; Moy (Raselli, Ryhner) (PP1) - 56:27; Niccolai (PP1) - 59:09
Janine Alder		Goalie stats	Alexandra Lehmann

Ladies Team Lugano won the series 3–1.

=== Game for 3rd place ===
13 March	Hockey Team Thurgau Indien Ladies	3-1	EV Bomo Thun	Güttingersreuti, Weinfelden	Recap
Stiefel (Staub, Michielin) - 11:18		First period	No scoring
Wetli (Stänz, Grascher) - 36:42		Second period	No scoring
Vallario (Kutzer) - 59:28		Third period	No scoring
Janine Alder		Goalie stats	Saskia Maurer

Hockey Team Thurgau Indien Ladies won the game and finish at the 3rd place.

=== Finals ===
20 March	ZSC Lions Frauen	2-3	Ladies Team Lugano	Kunsteisbahn Oerlikon, Zürich	Recap
Scheurer (Marti, Waidacher) - 10:58		First period	5:04 - Moy (Karvinen, Ryhner) (PP1); 19:42 - Raselli (Ryhner) (PP1)
Marti (Christen, Grascher) (PP1) - 23:29		Second period	No scoring
No scoring		Third period	51:57 - Karvinen
Nadia Häner		Goalie stats	Alexandra Lehmann

21 March	Ladies Team Lugano	1-3	ZSC Lions Frauen	La Resega, Lugano	Recap
No scoring		First period	No scoring
No scoring		Second period	Shashkina (Christen) - 25:20
53:00 - Ryhner (Karvinen, Bullo) (PP1)		Third period	Shashkina (SH1) - 45:22; Shashkina (EN) - 59:28
Alexandra Lehmann		Goalie stats	Nadia Häner

27 March	ZSC Lions Frauen	0-2	Ladies Team Lugano	Kunsteisbahn Oerlikon, Zürich	Recap
No scoring		First period	No scoring
No scoring		Second period	20:17 - Raselli (Ryhner, Karvinen); 37:26 - Raselli (Karvinen)
No scoring		Third period	No scoring
Caroline Baldin		Goalie stats	Alexandra Lehmann

28 March	Ladies Team Lugano	1-0	ZSC Lions Frauen	La Resega, Lugano	Recap
No scoring		First period	No scoring
No scoring		Second period	No scoring
51:57 - Karvinen (Ryhner, Bullo)		Third period	No scoring
Alexandra Lehmann		Goalie stats	Caroline Baldin

Ladies Team Lugano won the series 3–1.

=== Team of Swiss champions ===
Goalkeepers: Alexandra Lehmann, Giulia Mazzocchi

Defense: Celine Abgottspon, Nicole Bullo, Nathalie Buser, Elena Gaberell, Federica Galtieri, Nicla Gianettoni, Anneke Orlandini, Lisa Poletti, Franziska Stocker

Offense: Aurora Abatangelo, Laura Desboeufs, Romy Eggimann, Michelle Karvinen, Lucia Luraschi, Keely Moy, Greta Niccolai, Andrea Odermatt, Evelina Raselli, Noemi Ryhner

Coaching: Vasco Soldini, Pasi Koppinen

== Awards ==
- Most Valuable Player : Michelle Karvinen (Ladies Team Lugano)
- Best forward : Michelle Karvinen (Ladies Team Lugano)
- Best defender : Nicole Vallario (Hockey Team Thurgau Indien Ladies)
- Best goalkeeper : Janine Alder (Hockey Team Thurgau Indien Ladies)
- Best rookie : Alina Marti (ZSC Lions Frauen)
- Best coach : Andrin Christen (ZSC Lions Frauen)
