= 2022–23 Women's League season =

37th ice hockey season of the Swiss Women's League

- League: Women's League
- Sport: Ice hockey
- Duration: 17 September 2022 – 19 February 2023
- Games: 83
- Teams: 7

Regular Season
- Season Champions: ZSC Lions Frauen
- Season MVP: (Finland) Maija Otamo (EV Bomo Thun)

Women's League champion
- Champions: ZSC Lions Frauen
- Runners-up: EV Bomo Thun

Women's League seasons
- ← 2021–22 2023–24 →

The 2022–23 Women's League season was the 37th ice hockey season of the Swiss Women's League (abbreviated PFWL or SWHL A).

== Teams ==
Women's League teams for the 2022–23 season

After winning the 2022 SWHL B championship, the HC Ambrì-Piotta Girls (HCAP Girls) were promoted to the Women's League.

Team	Coach(es)	Location	Arena	Capacity
HC Ambrì-Piotta Girls	Dmitri Zygurow, Mario Gendotti	Quinto	Nuova Valascia	6,675
SC Langenthal Ladies	Ruedi Minder, Nicola Minder	Langenthal	Schoren Halle	4,320
Ladies Team Lugano	Benjamin Rogger, Pasi Koppinen	Lugano	Cornèr Arena	7,200
HC Université Neuchâtel Dames	Yan Gigon, Mike Gosselin, Thierry Bourquin	Neuchâtel	Patinoire du Littoral	7,000
EV Bomo Thun	Thomas Zwahlen, Petra Melicheríková	Thun	Kunsteisbahn Grabengut	4,000
Hockey Team Thurgau Indien Ladies	Emanuel Karrer, Monika Leuenberger	Kreuzlingen	Bodensee-Arena	4,300
ZSC Lions Frauen	Angela Frautschi, Christoph Scherrer	Zürich	Kunsteisbahn Oerlikon	1,700

== Regular season ==
The regular season started on 17 September 2022 and ended on 19 February 2023. The regular season was played four-cycle round-robin, that is to say that each of the seven teams played four games against each opponent for a total of 24 matches. The first four teams in the regular season ranking went on to compete in the best-of-five playoffs.

In the postseason, the three teams at the bottom of the table competed in a ranking round. Unlike previous seasons, the champion of the SWHL B was given the opportunity to be promoted directly to the Women's League for the 2023–24 season, in order to raise the number of participating teams to eight. The runner-up of the SWHL B championship played a league qualifier against the loser of the Women's League ranking round. In the event the SWHL B champion did not wish to be promoted, the runner-up would have had the option to be promoted directly and no Women's League team would be relegated. In the event both the SWHL B champion and runner-up did not wish to be promoted, there would have been no relegation from Women's League to SWHL-B.

Pos	Team	Pld	W	OTW	OTL	L	GF	GA	GD	Pts	Qualification
1	ZSC Lions Frauen	24	20	1	1	2	122	39	+83	63	Advance to Playoffs
2	EV Bomo Thun	24	19	1	1	3	109	30	+79	60	Advance to Playoffs
3	Ladies Team Lugano	23	11	1	4	7	61	48	+13	39	Advance to Playoffs
4	HT Thurgau Ladies	24	8	3	3	10	61	78	−17	33	Advance to Playoffs
5	SC Langenthal Ladies	24	7	4	1	12	47	66	−19	30	Advance to Ranking Round
6	HC Université Neuchâtel Dames	23	5	1	1	16	52	89	−37	18	Advance to Ranking Round
7	HC Ambrì-Piotta Girls	24	1	1	1	21	44	146	−102	6	Advance to Ranking Round

Source: Swiss Ice Hockey Federation
Rules for classification: 1) points; 2) a higher number of wins in the regular time; 3) a higher number of wins in overtime and shootouts; 4) goal difference; 5) number of goals scored; 6) drawing of lots.

=== Statistics ===
==== Scoring leaders ====
The following table shows the top-ten point scorers at the conclusion of the regular season. If two or more skaters are tied (i.e. same number of points, goals, and played games), all of the tied skaters are shown.

Player	Team	GP	G	A	Pts	PIM
(Finland) Maija Otamo	EV Bomo Thun	24	26	27	53	14
(France) Estelle Duvin	EV Bomo Thun	23	20	27	47	37
(United States) Skylar Fontaine	ZSC Lions Frauen	23	15	24	39	9
(Switzerland) Sinja Leemann	ZSC Lions Frauen	24	15	21	36	10
(Switzerland) Lisa Rüedi	ZSC Lions Frauen	24	11	25	36	36
(Switzerland) Alina Marti	ZSC Lions Frauen	24	12	19	31	12
(United States) Katie Cipra	ZSC Lions Frauen	24	16	10	26	8
(Switzerland) Stefanie Marty	EV Bomo Thun	18	8	17	25	8
(Switzerland) Cindy Joray	EV Bomo Thun	23	11	13	24	18
(Czech Republic) Simona Grascher	Hockey Team Thurgau Indien Ladies	22	15	8	23	14

==== Leading goaltenders ====
The following table shows the five goaltenders who led the league in goals against average while playing at least 40% of their team's minutes, at the conclusion of the regular season.

Player	Team(s)	GP	TOI	GA	GAA
(Switzerland) Alexandra Lehmann	EV Bomo Thun	13	632	11	1.05
(Switzerland) Jade Dübi	EV Bomo Thun	16	812	19	1.41
(Switzerland) Sandy Heim	ZSC Lions Frauen	17	864	24	1.67
(Switzerland) Sofia Decristophoris	Ladies Team Lugano	20	1216	37	1.83
(Switzerland) Caroline Spies	SC Langenthal Ladies	24	1404	59	2.52

== Playoffs ==
=== Bracket ===
Semi-finals (best-of-5)
1	ZSC Lions Frauen	3
4	Hockey Team Thurgau Indien Ladies	0
2	EV Bomo Thun	3
3	Ladies Team Lugano	1

Finals (best-of-5)
1	ZSC Lions Frauen	3
2	EV Bomo Thun	2
Game for 3rd place (best-of-1)
3	Ladies Team Lugano	1
4	Hockey Team Thurgau Indien Ladies	3

=== Semi-Finals ===
==== (1) ZSC Lions Frauen vs. (4) Hockey Team Thurgau Indien Ladies ====
25 February	ZSC Lions Frauen	3-0	Hockey Team Thurgau Indien Ladies	Kunsteisbahn Oerlikon, Zürich	Recap
Hauser (Schlegel) - 4:25		First period	No scoring
Scheurer (Schlegel, Hauser) (PP1) - 36:03		Second period	No scoring
Marti (Fontaine, Thalmann) - 49:26		Third period	No scoring
Sandy Heim		Goalie stats	Caroline Lambert

26 February	Hockey Team Thurgau Indien Ladies	0-5	ZSC Lions Frauen	Güttingersreuti, Weinfelden	Recap
No scoring		First period	Rüedi (Scheurer, Cipra) - 14:46; Marti (Fontaine, S. Bachmann) - 19:18
No scoring		Second period	Eggli (Hauser, Leemann) - 20:52
No scoring		Third period	Fontaine - 42:50; Thalmann (Marti, Eggli) - 56:44
Caroline Lambert		Goalie stats	Sandy Heim; Laura De Bastiani

4 March	ZSC Lions Frauen	6-2	Hockey Team Thurgau Indien Ladies	Kunsteisbahn Oerlikon, Zürich	Recap
No scoring		First period	0:24 - T. Grascher (S. Grascher, Kutzer); 5:43 - Wetli (Sigrist, Balzer)
Herzig (Marti) - 23:29; Scheurer (Fontaine) (PP1) - 28:52; Cipra - 35:41		Second period	No scoring
Hauser (No. Harju, Rüedi) - 41:29; Fontaine (Schlegel) - 50:38; Rüedi (Cipra) - 59:23		Third period	No scoring
Sandy Heim		Goalie stats	Caroline Lambert

ZSC Lions Frauen won the series 3–0.

==== (2) EV Bomo Thun vs. (3) Ladies Team Lugano ====
25 February	EV Bomo Thun	3-2	OT	Ladies Team Lugano	Kunsteisbahn Grabengut, Thun	Recap
Rossel (Joray, Duvin) - 3:54		First period		11:42 - Desboeufs
Otamo (Duvin) - 36:05		Second period		No scoring
No scoring		Third period		57:42 - Eggimann (Wuthrich, Desboeufs) (PP1)
Otamo (Joray, J. Marty) (PP1) - 64:04		First overtime period		No scoring
Jade Dübi		Goalie stats		Sofia Decristophoris

26 February	Ladies Team Lugano	0-1	EV Bomo Thun	Cornèr Arena, Lugano	Recap
No scoring		First period	No scoring
No scoring		Second period	Pélissou (Rossel) (PP1) - 23:02
No scoring		Third period	No scoring
Sofia Decristophoris		Goalie stats	Alexandra Lehmann

4 March	EV Bomo Thun	4-5	OT	Ladies Team Lugano	Kunsteisbahn Grabengut, Thun	Recap
Joray (Mason) - 7:32; Duvin (Otamo, Joray) - 18:18		First period		No scoring
No scoring		Second period		25:40 - Eggimann (Bullo)
Rensch (PP1) - 49:23; J. Marty (S. Marty) - 57:51		Third period		41:03 - Wuthrich (Orlandini); 42:51 - Orlandini (Bullo); 47:34 - Lutz (Gaberell)
No scoring		First overtime period		60:41 - Wuthrich (Eggimann, Bullo) (PP2)
Alexandra Lehmann		Goalie stats		Sofia Decristophoris

5 March	Ladies Team Lugano	1-6	EV Bomo Thun	Cornèr Arena, Lugano	Recap
15:07 - Desboeufs (Bullo)		First period	J. Marty (Duvin) - 8:37; Duvin (Pélissou) - 14:42
No scoring		Second period	Pélissou (Otamo, Duvin) - 20:41
No scoring		Third period	Joray (Duvin) - 41:26; Otamo (Rossel) - 50:00; Otamo (Duvin) - 57:36
Sofia Decristophoris		Goalie stats	Jade Dübi

EV Bomo Thun won the series 3–1.

=== Game for 3rd place ===
11 March	Ladies Team Lugano	1-3	Hockey Team Thurgau Indien Ladies	Cornèr Arena, Lugano	Recap
Abatangelo (Gianettoni, Desboeufs) (PP1) - 14:22		First period	10:14 - Wetli (Sigrist, Büchi); 13:02 - S. Grascher
No scoring		Second period	No scoring
No scoring		Third period	59:16 - T. Grascher (Balzer, S. Grascher) (EN)
Sofia Decristophoris		Goalie stats	Caroline Lambert

Hockey Team Thurgau Indien Ladies won the game and finish at the 3rd place.

=== Finals ===
11 March 2023	ZSC Lions Frauen	4-3	EV Bomo Thun	Kunsteisbahn Oerlikon, Zürich	Recap
Rüedi (Scheurer) - 3:36		First period	No scoring
No scoring		Second period	21:10 - J. Marty (S. Marty) (PP1)
Scheurer (Cipra, Hauser) - 41:20; Scheurer (Hauser, Rüedi) - 49:09; Scheurer (Baechler, Cipra) (PP1) - 55:01		Third period	44:58 - S. Marty (Rossel); 55:20 - Otamo (Hänggi)
Sandy Heim		Goalie stats	Jade Dübi

12 March	EV Bomo Thun	4-2	ZSC Lions Frauen	Kunsteisbahn Grabengut, Thun	Recap
16:49 - Duvin (Hänggi, Rossel)		First period	No scoring
22:15 - Duvin (Pélissou)		Second period	No scoring
53:13 - Rossel (PP1); 59:22 - Joray (Otamo) (EN)		Third period	Rüedi (Fontaine, Thalmann) - 44:40; Baechler (Hauser, Herzig) - 59:51
Alexandra Lehmann		Goalie stats	Sandy Heim

15 March	ZSC Lions Frauen	2-4	EV Bomo Thun	Kunsteisbahn Oerlikon, Zürich	Recap
No scoring		First period	2:51 - Hänggi (Joray, Duvin)
No. Harju (Rüedi) - 31:46		Second period	34:54 - Duvin
Leemann (Marti) - 53:32		Third period	51:15 - Otamo (Rensch); 59:30 - J. Marty (EN)
Sandy Heim		Goalie stats	Alexandra Lehmann

18 March	EV Bomo Thun	0-3	ZSC Lions Frauen	Kunsteisbahn Grabengut, Thun	Recap
No scoring		First period	Marti (Hauser) - 6:06; Leemann (Herzig, Marti) - 14:53
No scoring		Second period	Marti (Thalmann, Leemann) - 22:25
No scoring		Third period	No scoring
Alexandra Lehmann		Goalie stats	Sandy Heim

19 March	ZSC Lions Frauen	3-2	EV Bomo Thun	Kunsteisbahn Oerlikon, Zürich	Recap
No scoring		First period	14:34 - Otamo (Joray, Ryser)
No scoring		Second period	No scoring
Rüedi (Scheurer, Hauser) - 48:31; Marti (Leemann, Fontaine) - 58:12		Third period	40:25 - Joray (Otamo, Ryser)
Fontaine (Leemann) (PP1) - 60:47		overtime period	No scoring
Sandy Heim		Goalie stats	Alexandra Lehmann

ZSC Lions Frauen won the series 3–2.

=== Team of Swiss champions ===
Goalkeepers: Laura De Bastiani, Sandy Heim

Defense: Nele Bachmann, Alessia Baechler, Skylar Fontaine, Nina Harju, Janine Hauser, Jana Peter, Dominique Scheurer, Aurela Thalmann

Offense: Sara Bachmann, Katie Cipra, Chiara Eggli, Nora Harju, Naemi Herzig, Kristina Kontny, Sinja Leemann, Renee Lendi, Alina Marti, Lisa Rüedi, Jessica Schlegel

Coaching: Angela Frautschi, Christoph Scherrer

== Ranking round ==
Pos	Team	Pld	W	OTW	OTL	L	GF	GA	GD	Pts	Qualification
1	SC Langenthal Ladies	4	4	0	0	0	25	9	+16	12	Saison Ended
2	HC Université Neuchâtel Dames	4	1	1	0	2	14	22	−8	5	Saison Ended
3	HC Ambrì-Piotta Girls	4	0	0	1	3	12	20	−8	1	Advance to Relegation round

Rules for classification: 1) points; 2) a higher number of wins in the regular time; 3) a higher number of wins in overtime and shootouts; 4) goal difference; 5) number of goals scored; 6) drawing of lots.

HC Fribourg-Gottéron Ladies were crowned champions of SWHL B and, therefore, were promoted to the Women's League. The runner-up of the SWHL B finals, HC Tramelan Ladies, declined the opportunity to compete for promotion to the Women's League and, as a result, HC Ambrì-Piotta Girls kept their place in Women's League.

== Awards ==
- Most Valuable Player : Sinja Leemann (ZSC Lions Frauen)
- Best forward : Estelle Duvin (EV Bomo Thun)
- Best defender : Skylar Fontaine (ZSC Lions Frauen)
- Best goalkeeper : Sandy Heim (ZSC Lions Frauen)
- Best rookie : Alena Lynn Rossel (EV Bomo Thun)
- Best coach : Thomas Zwahlen (EV Bomo Thun)
