= 2017–18 SWHL A season =

- League: Swiss Women's League A
- Sport: Ice hockey
- Duration: September 17, 2017 – January 21, 2018
- Games: 60
- Teams: 6

Regular Season
- Season Champions: ZSC Lions Frauen
- Top scorer: (Switzerland) Alina Müller

Playoffs

Women's League champion
- Champions: ZSC Lions Frauen
- Runners-up: Ladies Team Lugano

Swiss Women's League A seasons
- ← 2016–17 2018–19 →

The 2017–18 Swiss League season was the 32nd season of the Swiss Women's League A.

== Teams ==
Swiss League teams for the 2017–18 season

Team	Trainer	City	Arena	Capacity
Ladies Team Lugano	Marzio Brambilla	Lugano	La Resega	7,200
HC Université Neuchâtel Dames	Yan Gigon, Thierry Bourquin	Neuchâtel	Patinoire du Littoral	7,000
SC Reinach Damen	Melanie Häfliger, Peter Küng	Reinach	Kunsteisbahn Oberwynental	-
EV Bomo Thun	Steve Huard	Thun	Kunsteisbahn Grabengut	4,000
SC Weinfelden Ladies	Adrian Gischig	Weinfelden	Güttingersreuti	3,100
ZSC Lions Frauen	Georg Taferner, Angela Frautschi	Zürich	Kunsteisbahn Oerlikon	1,700

== Regular season ==
The regular season started on 17 September 2017 and ended on 21 January 2018. The SWHL A game mode provides a preliminary round (phase 1) with 10 matches per team and a Masterround with 10 additional matches per team. The top 4 teams qualify for the playoffs and the bottom two compete for a play-off against relegation. The loser must face the SWHLB champion.

Pos	Team	Pld	W	OTW	OTL	L	GF	GA	GD	Pts	Qualification
1	ZSC Lions Frauen	20	19	0	1	0	150	24	+126	58	Advance to Playoffs
2	Ladies Team Lugano	20	15	0	1	4	95	37	+58	46	Advance to Playoffs
3	EV Bomo Thun	20	11	1	0	8	72	78	−6	35	Advance to Playoffs
4	SC Reinach Damen	20	6	2	0	12	59	77	−18	22	Advance to Playoffs
5	HC Université Neuchâtel Dames	20	5	0	1	14	35	94	−59	16	
6	SC Weinfelden Ladies	20	1	0	0	19	24	125	−101	3	

Rules for classification: 1) points; 2) a higher number of wins in the regular time; 3) a higher number of wins in overtime and shootouts; 4) goal difference; 5) number of goals scored; 6) drawing of lots.

=== Statistics ===
==== Scoring leaders ====
The following shows the top ten players who led the league in points, at the conclusion of the regular season. If two or more skaters are tied (i.e. same number of points, goals and played games), all of the tied skaters are shown.

Player	Team	GP	G	A	Pts	PIM
(Switzerland) Alina Müller	ZSC Lions Frauen	17	33	24	57	12
(Switzerland) Isabel Waidacher	ZSC Lions Frauen	19	20	28	48	24
(Switzerland) Nina Waidacher	ZSC Lions Frauen	20	22	25	47	45
(Switzerland) Christine Meier	ZSC Lions Frauen	19	13	34	47	4
(Switzerland) Evelina Raselli	Ladies Team Lugano	20	20	25	45	22
(Czech Republic) Simona Grascher	Ladies Team Lugano	19	17	20	37	24
(Switzerland) Romy Eggimann	Ladies Team Lugano	20	20	13	33	28
(France) Lara Escudero	EV Bomo Thun	20	15	17	32	44
(Canada) Leslie Oles	EV Bomo Thun	20	23	8	31	32
(Switzerland) Rahel Enzler	SC Reinach Damen	18	17	13	30	6

==== Leading goaltenders ====
The following shows the top five goaltenders who led the league in goals against average, provided that they have played at least 40% of their team's minutes, at the conclusion of the regular season.

Player	Team(s)	GP	TOI	GA	GAA
(France) Caroline Baldin	ZSC Lions Frauen	16	808	14	1,04
(Italy) Giulia Mazzocchi	Ladies Team Lugano	20	1172	35	1,79
(Switzerland) Vanessa Bolinger	SC Reinach Damen	14	846	51	3,38
(Switzerland) Nina Paiva	HC Université Neuchâtel Dames	12	697	47	3,94
(France) Caroline Lambert	SC Weinfelden Ladies	18	907	85	5,64

== Playoffs ==
=== Bracket ===
Semi-finals (best-of-5)
1	ZSC Lions Frauen	3
4	SC Reinach Damen	0
2	Ladies Team Lugano	3
3	EV Bomo Thun	0

Finals (best-of-5)
1	ZSC Lions Frauen	3
2	Ladies Team Lugano	0
Game for 3rd place (best-of-1)
3	EV Bomo Thun	1
4	SC Reinach Damen	2

=== Semi-Finals ===
==== (1) ZSC Lions Frauen vs. (4) SC Reinach Damen ====
3 March	ZSC Lions Frauen	6-4	SC Reinach Damen	Kunsteisbahn Oerlikon, Zürich	Recap
N. Waidacher (Müller) - 1:19; Müller (I. Waidacher, N. Waidacher) - 4:14		First period	17:25 - Marty
Müller (Christen) - 36:29		Second period	29:00 - R. Bräm (Thalmann, Marty) (PP1)
Meier (N. Waidacher) - 40:48; Müller (PP1) - 56:47; Müller (Vallotton) - 57:36		Third period	50:18 - Marty (Enzler) (SH1); 57:22 - Enzler (C. Bräm) (PP1)
Caroline Baldin		Goalie stats	Ramona Forrer

4 March	SC Reinach Damen	0-8	ZSC Lions Frauen	Kunsteisbahn Oberwynental, Reinach	Recap
No scoring		First period	Vallotton (Müller) - 6:43; Müller (A. Rüedi) - 7:05; Müller (Vallotton) - 8:47; M. Waidacher (Rüegg, Taylor) (PP1) - 18:00
No scoring		Second period	Müller (Taylor) - 26:54; Meier (N. Waidacher) - 33:17; Müller (Vallotton) - 34:00
No scoring		Third period	M. Waidacher (Müller) (PP1) - 59:57
Ramona Forrer		Goalie stats	Caroline Baldin; Ladina Danuser

10 March	ZSC Lions Frauen	15-2	SC Reinach Damen	Kunsteisbahn Oerlikon, Zürich	Recap
Taylor (Meier) - 4:29; Taylor (Rüegg) - 9:12; N. Waidacher (I. Waidacher, Müller) - 10:50; Gass - 13:31; Gass (Hauser) - 15:16; Müller (Hauser) (PP1) - 16:49		First period	No scoring
N. Waidacher (L. Rüedi, Christen) - 21:54; Meier (M. Waidacher) (SH1) - 23:41; Müller (I. Waidacher, N. Waidacher) - 25:37; Benz (PP1) - 31:08; Müller (Meier) (PP1) - 37:19; Gass (Christen) - 38:08		Second period	No scoring
Vallotton (Gass, Taylor) - 44:08; Müller (I. Waidacher) (PP1) - 55:35; Taylor (M. Waidacher) - 57:22		Third period	43:08 - C. Bräm (Nienaber); 59:07 - Enzler
Caroline Baldin; Ladina Danuser		Goalie stats	Luzia Krebs

ZSC Lions Frauen won the series 3–0

==== (2) Ladies Team Lugano vs. (3) EV Bomo Thun ====
3 March	Ladies Team Lugano	3-1	EV Bomo Thun	Recap
Bullo (Raselli) - 12:10		First period	No scoring
Gianettoni (Eggimann) - 27:35		Second period	31:49 - Pohlod (Oles, Strabley)
Eggimann (Raselli, Grascher) (PP1) - 57:43		Third period	No scoring
Giulia Mazzocchi		Goalie stats	Saskia Maurer

4 March	EV Bomo Thun	3-4	OT	Ladies Team Lugano	Recap
No scoring		First period		Odermatt - 12:35
28:17 - Forster (Pohlod, Oles); 33:31 - Oles (Forster)		Second period		Raselli - 36:06
51:59 - Escudero (Maurer)		Third period		Eggimann - 40:14
No scoring		First overtime period		Grascher (Eggimann) - 66:25
Saskia Maurer		Goalie stats		Giulia Mazzocchi

10 March	Ladies Team Lugano	5-1	EV Bomo Thun	Recap
Grascher (Bullo) - 17:46		First period	10:16 - Escudero
Desboeufs (Meyer, Orlandini) - 21:06		Second period	No scoring
Eggimann (Bolden, Bullo) (PP2) - 48:40; Bullo (Eggimann) - 53:31; Grascher (Eggimann) (PP1) - 56:52		Third period	No scoring
Giulia Mazzocchi		Goalie stats	Saskia Maurer

Ladies Team Lugano won the series 3–0

=== Game for 3rd place ===
17 March	EV Bomo Thun	1-2	SC Reinach Damen	Kunsteisbahn Grabengut, Thun	Recap
No scoring		First period	No scoring
No scoring		Second period	36:53 - C. Bräm (Enzler, Marty) (PP1)
Schranz - 53:18		Third period	55:34 - Fischer (Ryhner) (PP1)
Saskia Maurer		Goalie stats	Vanessa Bolinger

SC Reinach Damen won the game and finish at the 3rd place.

=== Finals ===
17 March	ZSC Lions Frauen	4-2	Ladies Team Lugano	Kunsteisbahn Oerlikon, Zürich	Recap
Müller (I. Waidacher, Gass) - 19:39		First period	2:29 - Raselli (Orlandini)
I. Waidacher (Müller) (PP1) - 22:27 Rüegg (Taylor) - 28:44; Müller (Meier) (PP1) - 38:50		Second period	No scoring
No scoring		Third period	46:50 - Raselli (Grascher)
Caroline Baldin		Goalie stats	Giulia Mazzocchi

18 March	Ladies Team Lugano	3-4	OT	ZSC Lions Frauen	La Resega, Lugano	Recap
No scoring		First period		Taylor (L. Rüedi) - 3:44; Taylor - 9:01
30:19 - Desboeufs (Bolden); 32:16 - Eggimann (Bullo, Grascher) (PP2)		Second period		Müller (Meier) (SH1) - 33:46
40:37 - Grascher (Bolden, Raselli) (PP1)		Third period		No scoring
No scoring		First overtime period		N. Waidacher (PP1) - 73:18
Giulia Mazzocchi		Goalie stats		Caroline Baldin

24 March	ZSC Lions Frauen	6-1	Ladies Team Lugano	Kunsteisbahn Oerlikon, Zürich	Recap
No scoring		First period	14:29 - Bolden
N. Waidacher - 26:42; A. Rüedi (Müller) - 39:26		Second period	No scoring
Müller (I. Waidacher) - 40:30; Müller (I. Waidacher) - 48:34; M. Waidacher (Rüegg) (PP1) - 51:56; I. Waidacher (Benz) - 54:00		Third period	No scoring
Caroline Baldin		Goalie stats	Giulia Mazzocchi

ZSC Lions Frauen won the series 3–0.

=== Team of Swiss champions ===
Goalkeepers: Caroline Baldin, Ladina Danuser, Laura De Bastiani

Defense: Laura Benz, Lara Christen, Nicole Gass, Janine Hauser, Christine Meier, Anna Neuenschwander, Jessica Vallotton

Offense: Sara Benz, Kristina Kontny, Alina Müller, Anna Rüedi, Lisa Rüedi, Dominique Rüegg, Jessica Schlegel, Angela Taylor, Isabel Waidacher, Monika Waidacher, Nina Waidacher

Coaching: Georg Taferner, Angela Frautschi

== Play-outs ==
3 March	HC Université Neuchâtel Dames	3-2	SC Weinfelden Ladies	Patinoire du Littoral, Neuchâtel	Recap
Clapham (Broad) - 6:08		First period	No scoring
Broad (Clapham, Berta) - 28:47		Second period	37:08 - Confidenti (Michielin)
Clapham (Seifert) - 48:38		Third period	53:01 - Stejskal (Müller)
Nina Paiva		Goalie stats	Caroline Lambert

4 March	SC Weinfelden Ladies	0-5 (Forfeit)	HC Université Neuchâtel Dames	Güttingersreuti, Weinfelden	Recap
No scoring		First period	No scoring
No scoring		Second period	No scoring
No scoring		Third period	No scoring

10 March	HC Université Neuchâtel Dames	1-0	SC Weinfelden Ladies	Patinoire du Littoral, Neuchâtel	Recap
No scoring		First period	No scoring
Joray (Clapham, Brich) - 31:55		Second period	No scoring
No scoring		Third period	No scoring
Nina Paiva		Goalie stats	Caroline Lambert

HC Université Neuchâtel Dames won the series 3–0

HC Université Neuchâtel Dames saves its place in SWHL A by winning the Play-outs.

== Promotion/Relegation ==
17 March	SC Brandis Ladies	1-6	SC Weinfelden Ladies	Sportbetriebe Brünnli, Hasle bei Burgdorf	Recap
No scoring		First period	Wetli (Stejskal) - 1:31; Ruh - 14:08
33:02 - M. Hofmann (A. Hofmann)		Second period	Hugentobler (Ruh) - 22:38; Confidenti (Michielin) - 22:51
No scoring		Third period	Confidenti (Gischig) - 44:07; Michielin (Confidenti) (PP1) - 46:39
Jeannine Bürki		Goalie stats	Caroline Lambert

18 March	SC Weinfelden Ladies	6-0	SC Brandis Ladies	Güttingersreuti, Weinfelden	Recap
Confidenti (Michielin) - 0:13; Confidenti (Ruh) (PP1) - 4:43; Farkas (Müller) - 4:50		First period	No scoring
Confidenti (Hugentobler) - 23:21; Farkas (Stejskal) - 38:15		Second period	No scoring
Hugentobler (Krause) - 59:47		Third period	No scoring
Caroline Lambert		Goalie stats	Jeannine Bürki

SC Weinfelden Ladies won the series 2–0
