= Romy Eggimann =

Swiss ice hockey player

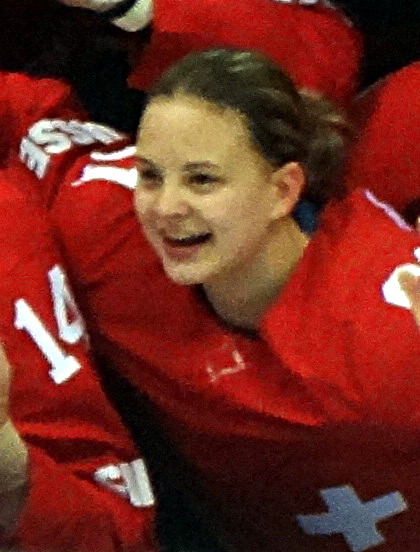
- Born: 29 September 1995 (age 31) Sumiswald, Bern, Switzerland
- Height: 158 cm (5 ft 2 in)
- Weight: 55 kg (121 lb; 8 st 9 lb)
- Position: Forward
- Shoots: Left
- SWHL A team: HC Lugano
- National team: Switzerland
- Playing career: 2008–present
Medal record
Olympic Games
Bronze medal – third place	2014 Sochi	Team

Romy Eggimann (born 29 September 1995) is a Swiss ice hockey forward who plays with the Ladies Team Lugano in the Swiss Women's Hockey League A (SWHL A) and internationally for the Swiss women's national team. She has represented Switzerland at the Winter Olympics in 2014 and won the bronze medal after defeating Sweden in the bronze medal playoff.

== Career statistics ==
=== Club ===
			Regular season					Playoffs
Season	Team	League	GP	G	A	Pts	PIM	GP	G	A	Pts	PIM
2009-10	Ladies Team Lugano	SWHL A	18	1	5	6	6	5	0	0	0	2
2010-11	Ladies Team Lugano	SWHL A	20	10	7	17	12	6	0	2	2	4
2011-12	Ladies Team Lugano	SWHL A	19	13	5	18	12	7	5	2	7	0
2012-13	Ladies Team Lugano	SWHL A	20	10	21	31	24	9	3	5	8	4
2013-14	Ladies Team Lugano	SWHL A	19	18	11	29	14	6	4	10	14	4
2014-15	Ladies Team Lugano	SWHL A	15	15	9	24	6	8	4	5	9	8
2015-16	Ladies Team Lugano	SWHL A	19	10	4	14	20	7	4	3	7	6
2016-17	Ladies Team Lugano	SWHL A	15	9	9	18	22	7	7	1	8	4
2016-17	Ladies Team Lugano	Swiss Women Cup	3	7	2	9	6	-	-	-	-	-
2017-18	Ladies Team Lugano	SWHL A	20	20	13	33	28	6	4	4	8	10
2017-18	Ladies Team Lugano	Swiss Women Cup	1	1	0	1	0	-	-	-	-	-
2018-19	Ladies Team Lugano	SWHL A	20	19	31	50	16	7	4	3	7	6
2018-19	Ladies Team Lugano	Swiss Women Cup	4	5	6	11	2	-	-	-	-	-
2019-20	Ladies Team Lugano	SWHL A	20	25	10	35	12	5	2	0	2	6
2019-20	Ladies Team Lugano	Swiss Women Cup	3	6	5	11	2	-	-	-	-	-
2020-21	Ladies Team Lugano	SWHL A	20	5	7	12	28	8	2	0	2	4
2021-22	Ladies Team Lugano	SWHL A	22	12	16	28	8	3	0	1	1	0
2021-22	Ladies Team Lugano	National Cup	3	3	3	6	0	-	-	-	-	-
2022-23	Ladies Team Lugano	SWHL A	16	4	9	13	37	5	2	1	3	0
2022-23	Ladies Team Lugano	National Cup	2	2	5	7	6	-	-	-	-	-
2023-24	HC Ambrì-Piotta Girls	SWHL A	27	19	16	35	34	5	2	1	3	2
2023-24	HC Ambrì-Piotta Girls	National Cup	2	2	2	4	0	-	-	-	-	-
SWHL A totals			293	191	175	366	279	99	43	38	81	62

=== International ===
Year	Team	Event	GP	G	A	Pts	PIM
2011	Switzerland U18	WJC18	6	0	0	0	2
2012	Switzerland U18	WJC-18	6	2	2	4	2
2013	Switzerland	WC	5	0	0	0	2
2013	Switzerland U18	WJC-18 D1	5	2	5	7	2
2014	Switzerland	OG	6	1	0	1	0
2015	Switzerland	WC	4	0	0	0	0
2016	Switzerland	WC	5	0	0	0	0
Junior totals			17	4	7	11	6
WC totals			14	0	0	0	2
OG totals			6	1	0	1	0

== Honours and achievements ==
=== SWHL-A ===
- 2008-2009 : Champion with Ladies Team Lugano
- 2009-2010 : Champion with Ladies Team Lugano
- 2013-2014 : Champion with Ladies Team Lugano
- 2014-2015 : Champion with Ladies Team Lugano
- 2016-2017 : Most Goals in Playoffs (17)
- 2018-2019 : Champion with Ladies Team Lugano
- 2018-2019 : Most Assists (31)
- 2020-2021 : Champion with Ladies Team Lugano

=== Swiss Women Cup ===
- 2016-2017 : Cup Winner with Ladies Team Lugano
- 2021-2022 : Cup Winner with Ladies Team Lugano

=== WJC-18 ===
2013 : Silver Medal in D1 Division 2013 : Most Assists (5) in D1 Division

=== OG ===
- 2014 : Bronze Medal
