= Nicole Gass =

Swiss ice hockey player (born 1993)

- Born: 18 August 1993 (age 32) Sherbrooke, Quebec, Canada
- Height: 172 cm (5 ft 8 in)
- Weight: 70 kg (154 lb; 11 st 0 lb)
- Position: Defence
- Shot: Right
- LNA team: ZSC Lions Frauen
- National team: Switzerland
- Playing career: 2012–2018

Nicole Gass (born 18 August 1993) is a Swiss ice hockey player who was born in Sherbrooke, Quebec, Canada. She played four seasons for the Colgate Raiders, graduating in 2016 and competed in the 2018 Winter Olympics.

Her uncles John Kordic and Dan Kordic both played ice hockey.
