= Eisgenossen =

Eisgenossen is a nickname that may refer to:

- Switzerland women's national ice hockey team
- Switzerland men's national ice hockey team
