= Phoebe Stänz =

Swiss ice hockey player

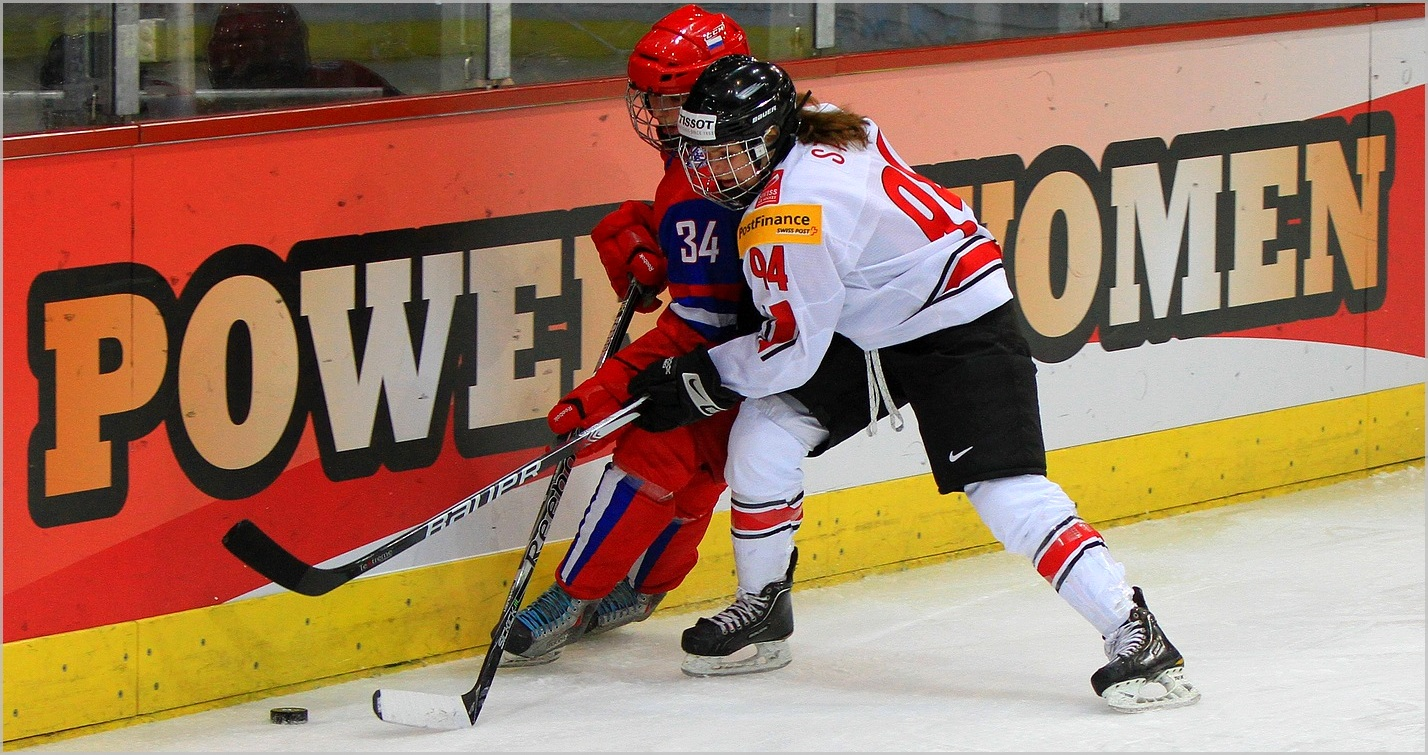
- Born: 7 January 1994 (age 32) Zurich, Switzerland
- Height: 1.64 m (5 ft 5 in)
- Weight: 62 kg (137 lb; 9 st 11 lb)
- Position: Forward
- Shoots: Left
- SDHL team Former teams: Leksands IF; HT Thurgau Ladies; Luleå HF/MSSK; Ladies Team Lugano; SDE HF; Yale Bulldogs; ZSC Lions Frauen
- National team: Switzerland
- Playing career: 2008–present
Medal record
Women's ice hockey
Representing Switzerland
Olympic Games
Bronze medal – third place	2014 Sochi	Team
World Championships
Bronze medal – third place	2012 United States

Phoebe Stänz (born 7 January 1994) is a Swiss ice hockey forward and member of the Swiss national ice hockey team, currently playing with Leksands IF Dam of the Swedish Women's Hockey League (SDHL). She played college ice hockey with the Yale Bulldogs and her senior career has been played in the SDHL and Swiss Women's League (previously SWHL A and LKA).

== Playing career ==
Stänz attended Choate Rosemary Hall Preparatory School in Wallingford, Connecticut during the 2012–13 school year. She was named MVP of the Prep School league and was honored as a 2013 Boston Globe All-Scholastic pick. While attending Choate, she also played club hockey with Assabet Valley, winning the 2013 National Championship with them.

=== Yale Bulldogs ===
Stänz played for the Yale Bulldogs women's ice hockey team. In four years of NCAA play, she won numerous awards, including USCO Rookie of the Year in 2014, and a selection to the All-ECAC Third Team.

While studying at Yale University, she majored in mathematics and economics. She worked in marketing for the Swiss Ice Hockey Federation during the summer months. She is also an accomplished musician.

== International play ==
=== U18 World Competition ===
Stänz played for the Swiss National U18 team for the IIHF World Championships in 2011 (Sweden), 2012 (Czech Republic) and the 2013 Qualifying Tournament in Switzerland.

=== 2014 Olympics (Sochi, Russia) ===
Phoebe Stänz was chosen to play with the Swiss National Team at the Winter Olympics in 2014. During the Bronze medal game, she scored the game-tying goal against Sweden, allowing Switzerland a 4–3 victory and the medal.

=== IIHF Teams ===
Stänz continues to play for the Swiss team. She was a member of the 2016 IIHF Olympic qualifying tournament. Switzerland won a spot in the 2018 Olympics in Korea. The Swiss National Team is currently ranked 6th worldwide. She is a longtime teammate of Lara Stalder, who plays NCAA Hockey for the Minnesota Duluth Bulldogs.

=== NCAA ===
Season	GP	G	A	Pts	PIM	PPG	SHG	GWG
2013–14	21	11	16	27	30	0	2	1
2014–15	30	8	17	25	27	3	1	1
2015–16	25	9	8	17	22	0	1	1
2016–17	25	14	10	24	12	4	0	4
Career Totals	101	42	51	93	91	7	4	7
