= Tess Allemann =

Swiss ice hockey player (born 1998)

- Born: 7 April 1998 (age 26); Farnern, Switzerland
- Height: 5 ft 6 in (168 cm)
- Weight: 139 lb (63 kg; 9 st 13 lb)
- Position: Forward
- Shoots: Left
- LNA team Former teams: SCL Tigers; EV Bomo Thun
- National team: Switzerland
- Playing career: 2013–present

Tess Allemann (born 7 April 1998) is a Swiss ice hockey player for SCL Tigers and the Swiss national team.

She participated at the 2017 IIHF Women's World Championship.
