= Dominique Rüegg =

Swiss ice hockey player

- Born: 5 February 1996 (age 29); St. Gallenkappel, Switzerland
- Height: 1.74 m (5 ft 9 in)
- Weight: 75 kg (165 lb; 11 st 11 lb)
- Position: Forward
- Shot: Left
- LNA team Former teams: ZSC Lions; SC Weinfelden
- National team: Switzerland
- Playing career: 2014–2022

Dominique Rüegg (born 5 February 1996) is a Swiss ice hockey player for ZSC Lions and the Swiss national team.

She participated at the 2015 IIHF Women's World Championship.
