= Mara Frey =

Swiss ice hockey player

- Born: 26 September 2002 (age 24)
- Height: 167 cm (5 ft 6 in)
- Weight: 59 kg (130 lb; 9 st 4 lb)
- Position: Forward
- Shoots: Left
- SWHL A team Former teams: ZSC Lions; SC Reinach; EV Bomo Thun
- National team: Switzerland
- Playing career: 2015–present

Mara Frey (born 26 September 2002) is a Swiss ice hockey player and member of the Swiss national ice hockey team, currently playing in the Swiss Women's League (SWHL A) with the ZSC Lions Frauen.

Frey represented Switzerland at the 2021 IIHF Women's World Championship. As a junior player with the Swiss national under-18 team, she participated in the 2020 IIHF Women's U18 World Championship.
