= Leoni Balzer =

Swiss ice hockey player (born 2006)

- Born: 18 January 2006 (age 20) Davos, Switzerland
- Height: 1.65 m (5 ft 5 in)
- Weight: 60 kg (132 lb; 9 st 6 lb)
- Position: Forward
- Shoots: Left
- PFWL team: HC Davos
- National team: Switzerland
- Playing career: 2018–present
Medal record
Olympic Games
Bronze medal – third place	2026 Milano Cortina	Team

Leoni Balzer (born 18 January 2006) is a Swiss ice hockey player. She participated in women's ice hockey tournament at the 2026 Winter Olympics.

== International play ==
Balzer skated for Switzerland at the IIHF Under-18 Women's World Championships in 2023 and 2024. With the Senior Team, she played at the 2025 IIHF Women's World Championship in České Budějovice, Czech Republic.

On 6 February 2026, Balzer, wearing number 68, made her Olympic debut, accumulating 11:48 of ice time. Of note, Switzerland beat Czechia in a 4-3 shootout win.

Regionalsport
