= Laura Zimmermann =

Swiss ice hockey player (born 2003)

- Born: 5 April 2003 (age 23) Habkern, Bern, Switzerland
- Height: 163 cm (5 ft 4 in)
- Weight: 69 kg (152 lb; 10 st 12 lb)
- Position: Forward
- Shoots: Left
- NCAA team Former teams: St. Cloud State Huskies; SC Reinach; EV Bomo Thun
- National team: Switzerland
- Playing career: 2016–present
Medal record
Olympic Games
Bronze medal – third place	2026 Milano Cortina	Team

Laura Zimmermann (born 5 April 2003) is a Swiss ice hockey player and member of the Swiss national ice hockey team. She has played college ice hockey in the Western Collegiate Hockey Association (WCHA) conference of the NCAA Division I with the St. Cloud State Huskies women's ice hockey program since 2022.

== International play ==
As a junior player with the Swiss national under-18 team, she participated in the IIHF U18 Women's World Championships in 2019 and 2020.

With the senior national team, Zimmermann represented Switzerland in the women's ice hockey tournament at the 2022 Winter Olympics and at the IIHF Women's World Championships in 2021, 2022, 2023, 2024, and 2025.

She won an Olympic bronze medal in the women's ice hockey tournament at the 2026 Winter Olympics.
