= Jessica Schlegel =

Swiss ice hockey player

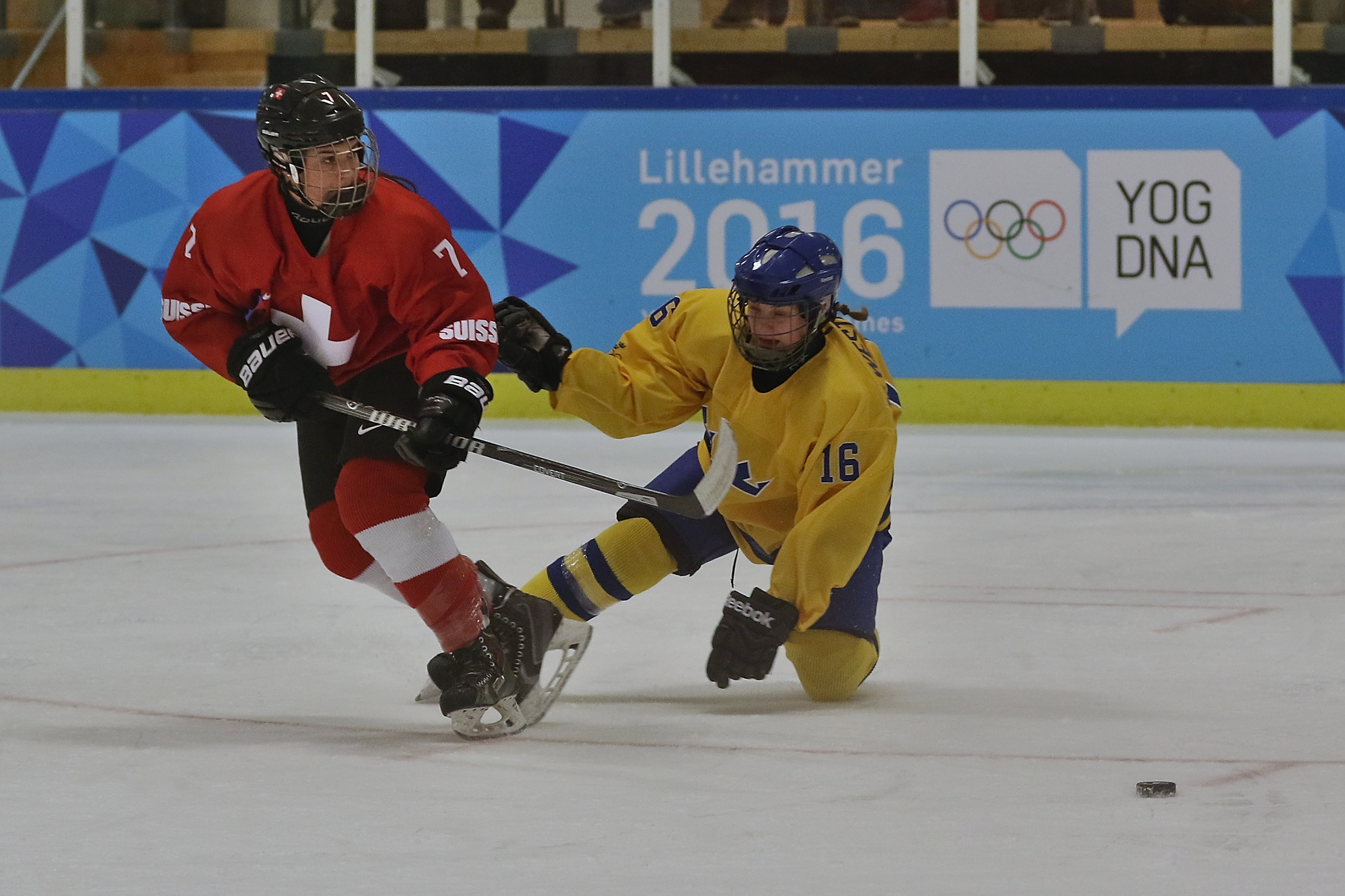
- Schlegel (red) at the 2016 Winter Youth Olympics
- Born: 20 August 2000 (age 25) Zürich, Switzerland
- Height: 1.65 m (5 ft 5 in)
- Weight: 72 kg (159 lb; 11 st 5 lb)
- Position: Forward
- Shoots: Left
- SWHL A team Former teams: ZSC Lions; GCK Lions
- National team: Switzerland
- Playing career: 2014–present

Jessica Schlegel (born 20 August 2000) is a Swiss Canadian ice hockey player, currently playing in the Swiss Women's League (SWHL A) with the ZSC Lions Frauen.

She represented Switzerland at the 2019 IIHF Women's World Championship. As a junior player with the Swiss national under-18 team, Schlegel participated in the IIHF U18 Women's World Championship in 2015, 2016, 2017, and 2018. At the 2016 Winter Youth Olympics in Lillehammer, she won a bronze medal in the girls' ice hockey tournament with the Swiss under-16 team.
