= Lara Christen =

Swiss ice hockey player (born 2002)

- Born: 2 October 2002 (age 24) Affoltern im Emmental, Switzerland
- Height: 1.63 m (5 ft 4 in)
- Weight: 61 kg (134 lb; 9 st 8 lb)
- Position: Defence
- Shoots: Right
- LNA team Former teams: SC Langenthal; ZSC Lions
- National team: Switzerland
- Playing career: 2016–present
Medal record
Olympic Games
Bronze medal – third place	2026 Milano Cortina	Team

Lara Christen (born 2 October 2002) is a Swiss ice hockey player for SC Langenthal and the Swiss national team.

== Playing career ==
=== International ===
She represented Switzerland at the 2019 IIHF Women's World Championship.

In the bronze medal game of the 2026 Winter Olympics, versus Sweden, she logged an assist, as Switzerland went on to prevail in a 2-1 overtime win.
