= Janine Hauser =

Swiss ice hockey player (born 2001)

- Born: 6 May 2001 (age 25) Urdorf, Zürich, Switzerland
- Height: 169 cm (5 ft 7 in)
- Weight: 69 kg (152 lb; 10 st 12 lb)
- Position: Defense
- Shoots: Left
- SWHL A team: ZSC Lions
- National team: Switzerland
- Playing career: 2017–present

Janine Hauser (born 6 May 2001) is a Swiss ice hockey player and member of the Swiss national team, currently playing in the Swiss Women's League (SWHL A) with the ZSC Lions Frauen.

Hauser represented Switzerland at the IIHF Women's World Championship in 2021 and 2022. As a junior player with the Swiss national under-18 team, she participated in the IIHF Women's U18 World Championships in 2016, 2017, 2018, and 2019. At the 2016 Winter Youth Olympics, she won a bronze medal with Switzerland in the girls' ice hockey tournament.
