= Alina Marti =

Swiss ice hockey player (born 2004)

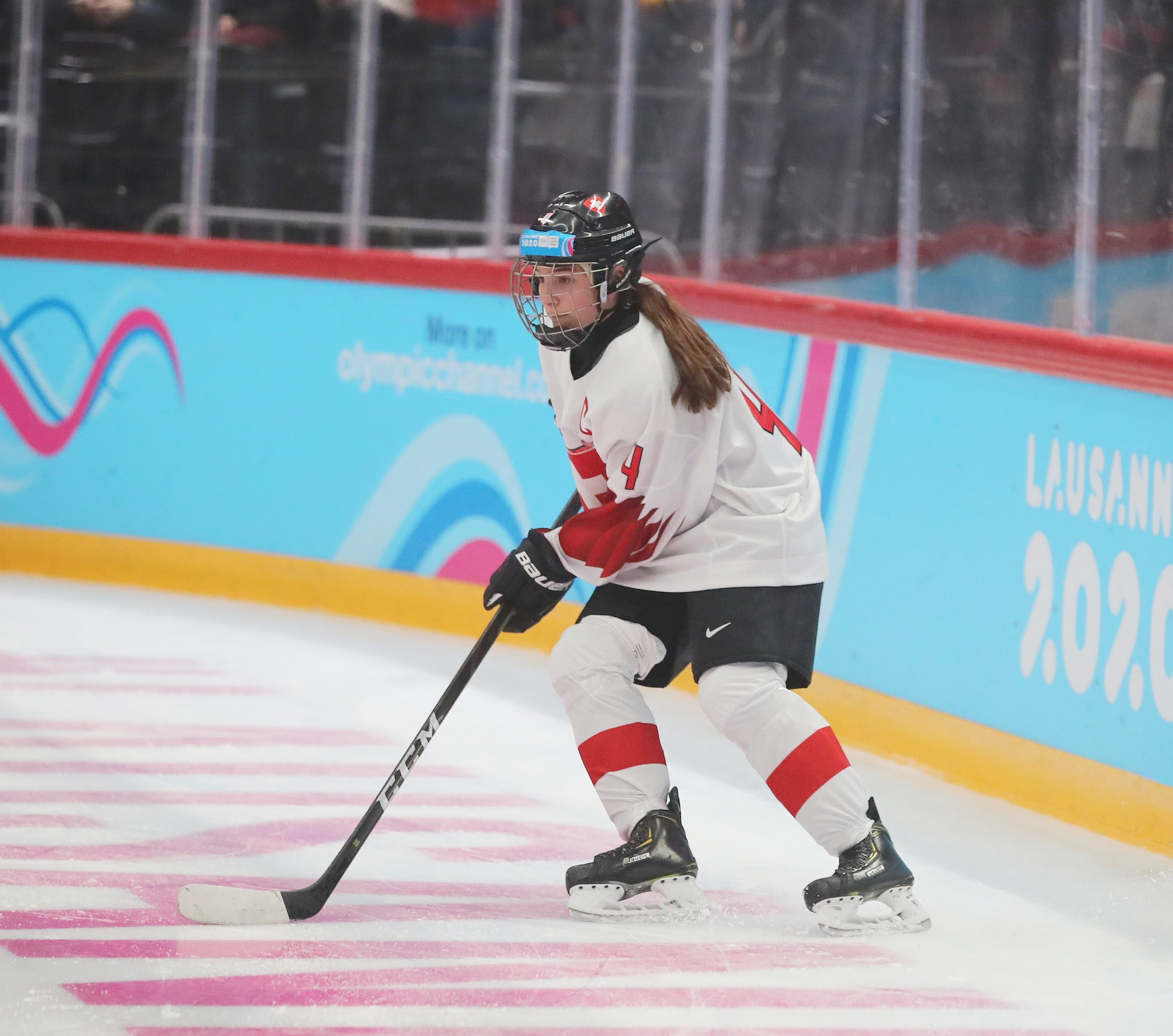
- Marti representing Switzerland at the 2020 Winter Youth Olympics
- Born: 23 April 2004 (age 22) Bleienbach, Bern, Switzerland
- Height: 167 cm (5 ft 6 in)
- Weight: 66 kg (146 lb; 10 st 6 lb)
- Position: Forward
- Shoots: Left
- PFWL team Former teams: EVZ Women's Team; ZSC Lions; SC Langenthal
- National team: Switzerland
- Playing career: 2015–present
Medal record
Olympic Games
Bronze medal – third place	2026 Milano Cortina	Team

Alina Marti (born 23 April 2004) is a Swiss ice hockey player and member of the Swiss national ice hockey team. She has played in the Women's League (PFWL) with the EVZ Women's Team since 2025.

== International play ==
Marti represented Switzerland in the girls' ice hockey tournament at the 2020 Winter Youth Olympics,.

As a junior player with the Swiss national under-18 team, she participated in the IIHF U18 Women's World Championship in 2020 and 2022.

Marti made her senior national team debut as the youngest Swiss player (aged 17 years and four months) at the 2021 IIHF Women's World Championship. She has since participated in the IIHF Women's World Championship in 2022, 2023, 2024, and 2025.

A two-time Olympian, Marti competed in the women's ice hockey tournament at the 2022 Winter Olympics and won a bronze medal in the women's ice hockey tournament at the 2026 Winter Olympics.

In the bronze medal game of the 2026 Winter Olympics, versus Sweden, she logged an assist, as Switzerland went on to prevail in a 2-1 overtime win.
