= Sinja Leemann =

Swiss ice hockey player (born 2002)

- Born: 19 April 2002 (age 24) Gossau
- Height: 1.68 m (5 ft 6 in)
- Weight: 62 kg (137 lb; 9 st 11 lb)
- Position: Forward
- Shoots: Left
- LNA team Former teams: SC Bern; ZSC Lions; GCK Lions; SC Weinfelden
- National team: Switzerland
- Playing career: 2014–present
Medal record
Olympic Games
Bronze medal – third place	2026 Milano Cortina	Team

Sinja Leemann (born 19 April 2002) is a Swiss professional ice hockey forward for SC Bern of the Women's League (Switzerland) and the Swiss national team.

Leemann played with the ZSC Lions from 2021 to 2025. During this time she was one of the top scorers and helped the ZCS Lions become three time SWHL A(W) Champions. She has represented Switzerland on the Switzerland women's national ice hockey team since 2019.

== Early life ==
Leemann was born on 19 April 2002 in Gossau, Canton of Zurich, Switzerland.

== Playing career ==
=== Early career ===
Leemann began playing ice hockey in 2014 in the Swiss Women's Hockey League B (SWHL B) for the GCK Lions and in the U15 League for SC Rapperswil-Jona. She moved up to the A League and signed with the SC Weinfelden Ladies (now HC Davos). She played with them from 2016 to 2019 before signing with Hockey Team Thurgau Indien Ladies for one season.

=== Later career ===
Following her tenure at Hockey Team Thurgau Indien Ladies, Leemann signed with ZCS Lions for the 2021/2022 season. During her time with the team Leemann helped the team win three championships and was voted MVP. She was captain of the team from 2022 to 2025.

On 31 March 2025, it was announced that Leemann signed with SC Bern for the upcoming 2025/2026 season.

=== International career ===
Leemann has represented Switzerland in the Switzerland women's national ice hockey team since 2019. During this time, she has played in the IIHF Women's World Championship in 2019, 2021, 2022, 2023, 2024, and 2025. The team made it to the semi-finals in 2021, 2022, and 2023.

In the bronze medal game at the 2026 Winter Olympics, versus Sweden, Leemann contributed a goal in a 2-1 overtime victory.

== Medals and Awards ==
=== 2021/2022 Season ===
- SWHL A (W) Champion (ZSC Lions Frauen)
- SWHL A (W) Most Goals Playoffs (6)
- World Championship (W) Top 3 Player on Team

=== 2022/2023 Season ===
- National Cup (W) Winner (ZSC Lions Frauen)
- SWHL A (W) Champion (ZSC Lions Frauen)
- SWHL A (W) swisshockeynews Most Valuable Player

=== 2023/2024 Season ===
- SWHL A (W) Champion (ZSC Lions Frauen)
