= Alessia Baechler =

Swiss ice hockey player (born 2005)

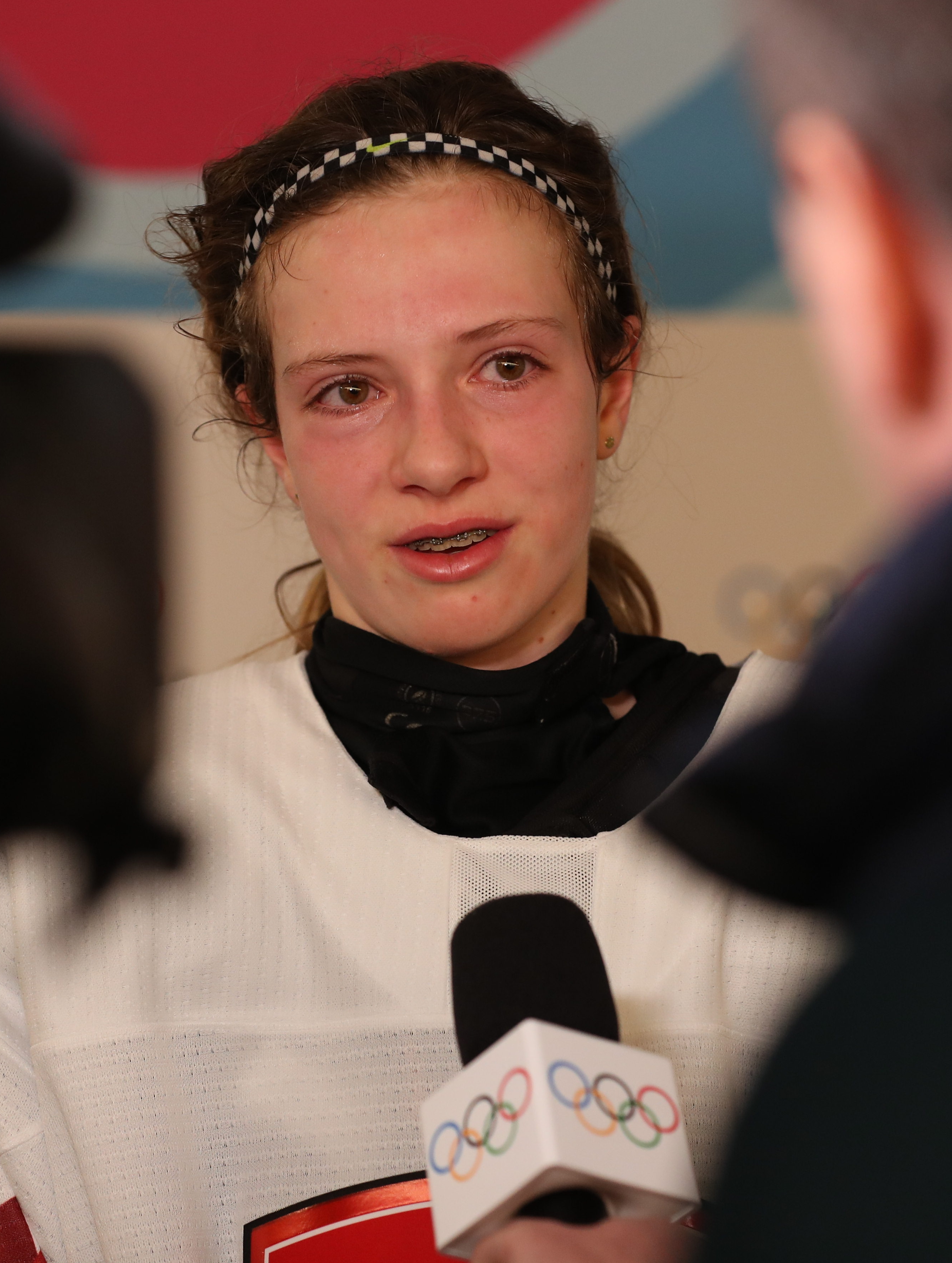
- Baechler at the 2020 Winter Youth Olympics
- Born: 7 September 2005 (age 21) Illnau-Effretikon, Switzerland
- Height: 1.74 m (5 ft 9 in)
- Weight: 59 kg (130 lb; 9 st 4 lb)
- Position: Defense
- HEA team Former teams: Northeastern Huskies; HC Davos
- National team: Switzerland
- Playing career: 2017–present
Medal record
Olympic Games
Bronze medal – third place	2026 Milano Cortina	Team

Alessia Baechler (born 7 September 2005) is a Swiss ice hockey player. She is a members of the Switzerland women's national ice hockey team that participated in women's ice hockey tournament at the 2026 Winter Olympics.

== Playing career ==
From 2017 to 2024, she was a member of the ZSC Lions, enjoying three Swiss league championships (2022, 2023, 2024).

=== College ===
Baechler currently plays college ice hockey with the Northeastern Huskies women's ice hockey program in the Hockey East (HEA) conference of the NCAA Division I.

On 3 October 2025, Baechler made her debut with the Huskies, registering two shots on net versus the RIT Tigers, also blocking a shot. The milestone of her first goal occurred on 28 November 2025 against No. 4 ranked Penn State.

Of note, Baechler was the only active student at Northeastern to compete in the 2026 Winter Olympics.

== International play ==
Baechler competed with Switzerland at four IIHF Women's World Championship tournaments (2022, 2023, 2024, 2025). In addition, she participated in three IIHF Under-18 Women's World Championships.
