= Lisa Rüedi =

Swiss ice hockey player (born 2000)

- Born: 3 November 2000 (age 25) Thusis, Graubünden, Switzerland
- Height: 1.67 m (5 ft 6 in)
- Weight: 64 kg (141 lb; 10 st 1 lb)
- Position: Forward
- Shoots: Left
- SWHL A team: ZSC Lions
- National team: Switzerland
- Playing career: 2014–present
Medal record
Olympic Games
Bronze medal – third place	2026 Milano Cortina	Team

Lisa Rüedi (born 3 November 2000) is a Swiss ice hockey player and member of the Swiss national team, currently playing in the Swiss Women's League (SWHL A) with the ZSC Lions Frauen. She served as captain of the ZSC Lions during the 2020–21 season, during which the team won the Swiss Women's Cup, and the 2021–22 season, in which the Lions were SWHL A champions.

== International play ==
Rüedi represented Switzerland in the women's ice hockey tournament at the 2018 Winter Olympics in PyeongChang, the women's ice hockey tournament at the 2022 Winter Olympics in Beijing, and at the IIHF Women's World Championships in 2017, 2019, 2021, and 2022. As a junior player with the Swiss national under-18 team, she participated in the IIHF U18 Women's World Championship in 2015, 2016, 2017, and 2018. At the 2016 Winter Youth Olympics in Lillehammer, she won a bronze medal in the girls' ice hockey tournament with the Swiss under-16 team.
