= Switzerland women's national ice hockey team =

Women's national ice hockey team representing Switzerland

Switzerland
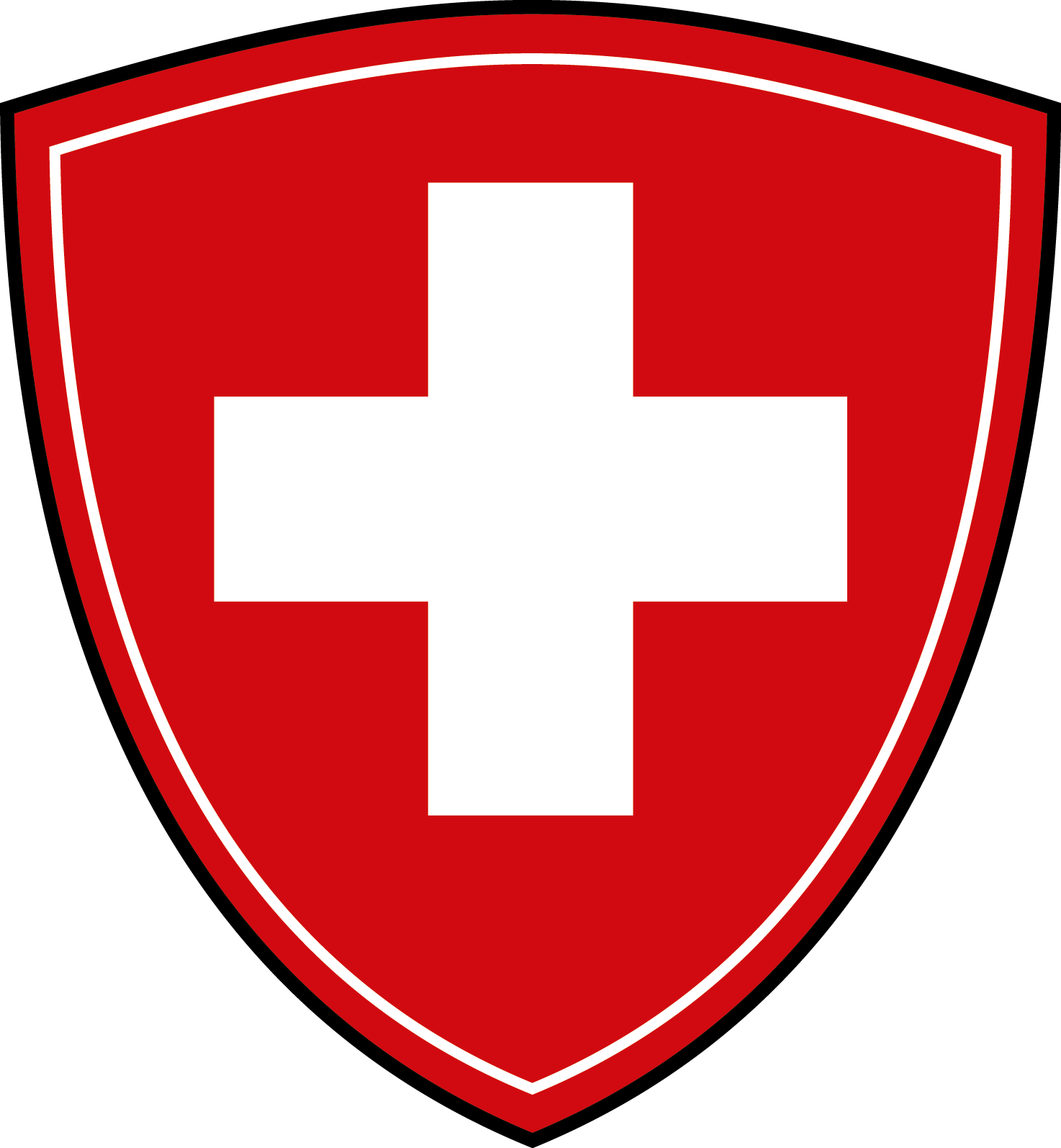
- Nickname: Eisgenossinnen
- Association: Swiss Ice Hockey Federation
- General manager: Melanie Häfliger
- Head coach: Shannon Miller
- Assistants: Saara Kivenmäki; Justin Krueger
- Captain: Alina Müller
- Most games: Nicole Bullo (89)
- Top scorer: Lara Stalder (42)
- Most points: Lara Stalder (91)
- Team colors
- IIHF code: SUI
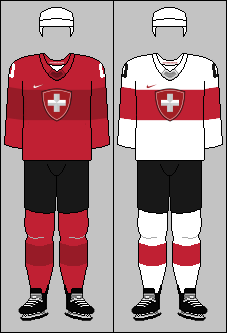

Ranking
- Current IIHF: 4 ▲1 (3 June 2026)
- Highest IIHF: 3 (first in 2014)
- Lowest IIHF: 9 (first in 2003)

First international
- Canada 10–0 Switzerland (North York or Mississauga, Canada; 21 April 1987)

Biggest win
- Switzerland 21–2 France (Basel, Switzerland; 29 December 1989)

Biggest defeat
- United States 17–0 Switzerland (Tampere, Finland; 20 April 1992)

Olympics
- Appearances: 6 (first in 2006)
- Medals: Bronze (2014, 2026)

World Championships
- Appearances: 25 (first in 1990)
- Best result: (bronze) Bronze (2012)

International record (W–L–T)
- 286–249–30

Switzerland women's national ice hockey team
Medal record

Olympic Games
| Bronze medal – third place | 2014 Sochi | Team |
| Bronze medal – third place | 2026 Milano Cortina | Team |

World Championships
| Bronze medal – third place | 2012 United States | |

European Championships
| Bronze medal – third place | 1995 Latvia | |

The Swiss women's national ice hockey team represents Switzerland at the International Ice Hockey Federation's Women's World Championship and other international ice hockey tournaments. The women's national team is controlled by the Swiss Ice Hockey Federation.

== Tournament record ==
=== Olympic Games ===
- 2006 – Finished in 7th place
- 2010 – Finished in 5th place
- 2014 – (bronze) Won Bronze Medal
- 2018 – Finished in 5th place
- 2022 – Finished in 4th place
- 2026 – (bronze) Won Bronze Medal

=== World Championship ===
- 1990 – Finished in 5th place
- 1992 – Finished in 8th place
- 1994 – Finished in 7th place
- 1997 – Finished in 7th place
- 1999 – Finished in 8th place (Demoted to Division I)
- 2000 – Finished in 10th place (2nd in Division I)
- 2001 – Finished in 9th place (1st in Division I, Promoted to Top Division)
- 2004 – Finished in 8th place (Demoted to Division I)
- 2005 – Finished in 9th place (1st in Division I, Promoted to Top Division)
- 2007 – Finished in 5th place
- 2008 – Finished in 4th place
- 2009 – Finished in 7th place
- 2011 – Finished in 6th place
- 2012 – (bronze) Won Bronze Medal
- 2013 – Finished in 6th place
- 2015 – Finished in 6th place
- 2016 – Finished in 7th place
- 2017 – Finished in 7th place
- 2019 – Finished in 5th place
- 2020 – Cancelled due to the COVID-19 pandemic
- 2021 – Finished in 4th place
- 2022 – Finished in 4th place
- 2023 – Finished in 4th place
- 2024 – Finished in 5th place
- 2025 – Finished in 5th place
- 2026 – Finished in 6th place

=== European Championship ===
- 1989 – Finished in 5th place
- 1991 – Finished in 5th place
- 1993 – Finished in 5th place
- 1995 – (bronze) Won Bronze Medal
- 1996 – Finished in 5th place

== Team ==
=== Current roster ===
Roster for the 2026 IIHF Women's World Championship.

Head coach: Shannon Miller

| No. | Pos. | Name | Height | Weight | Birthdate | Team |
|---|---|---|---|---|---|---|
| 5 | F | Nora Harju | 1.69 m (5 ft 7 in) | 67 kg (148 lb) | 5 January 2003 (age 23) | (Switzerland) ZSC Lions |
| 6 | D | Mara Frey | 1.70 m (5 ft 7 in) | 66 kg (146 lb) | 26 September 2002 (age 24) | (Switzerland) EV Zug |
| 11 | F | Laura Zimmermann | 1.63 m (5 ft 4 in) | 73 kg (161 lb) | 5 April 2003 (age 23) | (United States) St. Cloud State Huskies |
| 13 | F | Ivana Wey | 1.72 m (5 ft 8 in) | 68 kg (150 lb) | 4 February 2006 (age 20) | (United States) Northeastern Huskies |
| 15 | D | Laure Mériguet | 1.73 m (5 ft 8 in) | 65 kg (143 lb) | 15 August 2008 (age 18) | (Switzerland) Genève Futur Hockey |
| 16 | D | Nicole Vallario | 1.66 m (5 ft 5 in) | 71 kg (157 lb) | 30 August 2001 (age 25) | (United States) New York Sirens |
| 18 | D | Stefanie Wetli | 1.73 m (5 ft 8 in) | 75 kg (165 lb) | 4 February 2000 (age 26) | (Switzerland) ZSC Lions |
| 20 | G | Andrea Brändli | 1.69 m (5 ft 7 in) | 75 kg (165 lb) | 5 June 1997 (age 29) | (United States) Detroit Clutch |
| 21 | F | Rahel Enzler | 1.63 m (5 ft 4 in) | 64 kg (141 lb) | 30 July 2000 (age 26) | (Switzerland) EV Zug |
| 22 | F | Sinja Leemann | 1.68 m (5 ft 6 in) | 66 kg (146 lb) | 19 April 2002 (age 24) | (Switzerland) SC Bern |
| 25 | F | Alina Müller – C | 1.67 m (5 ft 6 in) | 65 kg (143 lb) | 12 March 1998 (age 28) | (Canada) Hamilton Havoc |
| 26 | F | Naemi Herzig – A | 1.68 m (5 ft 6 in) | 70 kg (150 lb) | 21 March 2007 (age 19) | (United States) Holy Cross Crusaders |
| 27 | F | Elisa Dalessi | 1.53 m (5 ft 0 in) | 56 kg (123 lb) | 30 January 2007 (age 19) | (Switzerland) HC Davos |
| 28 | F | Alina Marti | 1.68 m (5 ft 6 in) | 70 kg (150 lb) | 23 April 2004 (age 22) | (Switzerland) EV Zug |
| 29 | G | Saskia Maurer | 1.66 m (5 ft 5 in) | 60 kg (130 lb) | 29 July 2001 (age 25) | (Switzerland) SC Bern |
| 30 | G | Chiara Pfosi | 1.78 m (5 ft 10 in) | 80 kg (180 lb) | 29 March 1998 (age 28) | (Switzerland) EV Zug |
| 47 | F | Jael Manetsch | 1.64 m (5 ft 5 in) | 64 kg (141 lb) | 3 September 2007 (age 19) | (Switzerland) EV Zug |
| 68 | F | Leoni Balzer | 1.65 m (5 ft 5 in) | 64 kg (141 lb) | 18 January 2006 (age 20) | (Switzerland) HC Davos |
| 72 | F | Luisa Waser | 1.59 m (5 ft 3 in) | 52 kg (115 lb) | 18 August 2000 (age 26) | (Switzerland) EV Zug |
| 73 | F | Norina Müller | 1.62 m (5 ft 4 in) | 53 kg (117 lb) | 24 August 2008 (age 18) | (Switzerland) Fribourg HC |
| 76 | D | Lucienne Tenenbaum | 1.78 m (5 ft 10 in) | 75 kg (165 lb) | 21 April 2006 (age 20) | (United States) Minnesota State Mavericks |
| 77 | D | Nina Harju | 1.70 m (5 ft 7 in) | 72 kg (159 lb) | 14 June 2004 (age 22) | (Switzerland) EV Zug |
| 82 | D | Alessia Baechler – A | 1.74 m (5 ft 9 in) | 68 kg (150 lb) | 7 September 2005 (age 21) | (United States) Northeastern Huskies |
| 86 | F | Ilana Leibundgut | 1.74 m (5 ft 9 in) | 71 kg (157 lb) | 9 January 2007 (age 19) | (Switzerland) HC Davos |
| 94 | F | Alena Rossel | 1.71 m (5 ft 7 in) | 64 kg (141 lb) | 8 June 2006 (age 20) | (Switzerland) HC Davos |
