= Women's League (Switzerland) =

Ice hockey league in Switzerland

- Current season, competition or edition: 2026–27 Women's League season
- Formerly: Leistungsklasse A; 1986–2014; Swiss Women's Hockey League A; 2014–2019
- Sport: Ice hockey
- Founded: 1986
- Founder: Swiss Ice Hockey Federation
- First season: 1986–87
- No. of teams: 7
- Country: Switzerland
- Most recent champion: EV Zug (2025–26)
- Most titles: ZSC Lions (12 titles)
- Domestic cup: Swiss Women's Hockey Cup
- International cups: EWHL Super Cup; European Women's Champions Cup (2004–2015)
- Related competitions: SWHL B; SWHL C; SWHL D
- Website: Official website

The Women's League, also known as the PostFinance Women's League (PFWL) for sponsorship reasons, is the premier ice hockey league in the Swiss Women's Hockey League (SWHL) system. The league was founded in 1986 as the Leistungsklasse A, abbreviated LKA, and was also officially known as the Ligue nationale A in French and the Lega Nazionale A in Italian, both abbreviated as LNA. During 2014 to 2019, the league was called the Swiss Women's Hockey League A, abbreviated SWHL A; the abbreviation has been used by the league following the 2019 name change. A semi-professional league, it is organized by the Swiss Ice Hockey Federation (SIHF).

== History ==
With the creation of several women's ice hockey clubs in the early 1980s, the SIHF chose to incorporate women's hockey within the scope of its governance in 1984. During the 1985–86 season, an unofficial club championship was played. The following season, the first official championship tournament, called Leistungsklasse A ('Performance Class A'), was organized and the victors, the Kloten Specials of EHC Kloten, became the first Swiss Champions in women's ice hockey.

With the growing interest and participation in ice hockey among Swiss women, a second tier league, called the Leistungsklasse B (LKB), was established from the 1988–89 season. Two years later, league rules were changed to allow foreign players and several big names in international women's hockey opted to play with Swiss teams, including Canadian national team forwards Andria Hunter and France Saint-Louis, and Finnish national team phenom Riikka Sallinen. The arrival of imports coincided with the rise to dominance of SC Lyss, who won four titles in five years from 1991–92 to 1996–97. The women's section had become an independent club, the DHC Lyss, when they won their fourth title in 1997. In 1995, a third level league, the Leistungsklasse C (LKC), was introduced.

From the 2001–02 season onward, a final four tournament is held to determine the Swiss Champion. SC Reinach, the 2001 champions, retained their title in the league's inaugural final four in 2002 and followed it up with a third consecutive victory in 2003. Playoffs were introduced in the 2005–06 season and the HC Lugano Ladies Team and ZSC Lions Frauen dominated in the playoff era, with one of the two teams winning the championship in all but one year since format change.

== Format ==
Starting from the 2010–11 season, the participating teams play against each other four times in two home-and-away rounds. At the end of the first round, the each team's total of points is cut by half. Once the second round is completed, the top ranking teams qualify for the play-offs which are in a best-of-five format, excepted the third place game played on a one-off match. The finals winner is declared Swiss Champion. Meanwhile, the teams finishing in the bottom two positions dispute a best-of-five playdown. The loser then faces the second tier champions in a best-of-three games series, the winner getting to play the following season in the top tier.

== Teams ==
Location in Switzerland of Women's League teams participating in the 2026–27 season

The women's team of HC Fribourg-Gottéron joined the league in 2023, increasing the number of teams to eight for the 2023–24 season.

During summer 2023, EV Bomo Thun, a previously independent club, merged into SC Bern and the team adopted the name of their new parent club, becoming SC Bern Frauen. The HC Thurgau women's team left HC Thurgau to move under the oversight of HC Davos and adopted the name of their new parent club, becoming the HC Davos Ladies.

In March 2023, HC Ladies Lugano announced the club had insufficient finances and was ceasing operations but they unexpectedly began pre-season training in August 2023, after securing a sponsorship deal with an investment company. After finishing seventh of eight teams in the 2023–24 season, the club announced its definitive closure, citing "insurmountable financial difficulties."

EV Zug (EVZ) announced the creation of its women's team (German: EV Zug (EVZ) Frauenteam) in November 2022 and the team was officially launched ahead of the 2023–24 season. With a budget of 1.2 million francs for the "EVZ Women and Girls Programm," EV Zug was able to attract elite players and staff, including Swiss ice hockey icon Daniela Diaz and international phenom and Swiss national team captain Lara Stalder. The team made a commanding debut in the SWHL B, claiming ten victories across their first ten games and conceding just one goal while scoring 178 goals during that period. At season's end, the EVZ Women's Team won the SWHL B championship and were poised to face the loser of the SWHL A play-down in the Women's League qualification series but the voluntary relegation of HC Ladies Lugano made it possible for the team to gain automatic promotion.

In December 2025, SC Langenthal announced that SC Langenthal women's team would be dissolved after the 2025–26 season due to economic factors. The team played out the remainder of the season and then ceased operations.

The representative women's team of Lausanne HC were the only SWHL B team to express interest in filling the vacancy left in the Women's League by SC Langenthal's voluntary withdrawal and were granted promotion on those grounds. Not content to rest on their assured promotion, the team went on to win the SWHL B championship in 2026.

=== Current teams ===
The following teams are participating in the 2026–27 season of the Women's League. Originally 8 teams were planned, however, following the withdrawal by HC Ambrì-Piotta of the Women's team from the league in July 2026, the Swiss Ice Hockey Federation announced that the season would proceed with 7 teams.

Team	Location	Home venue	Head coach
SC Bern	Bern	PostFinance Arena	Michel Zwahlen
HC Davos	Davos	Eisstadion Davos	Evelina Raselli
HC Fribourg-Gottéron	Fribourg	BCF Arena	Thomas Zwahlen
Lausanne HC	Lausanne	Vaudoise Aréna	Mathieu Echenard
Neuchâtel Hockey Academy	Neuchâtel	Patinoires du Littoral	Yan Gigon (interim)
EV Zug	Zug	Bossard Arena	Daniela Diaz
ZSC Lions	Zürich	Kunsteisbahn Heuried; Secondary: Swiss Life Arena	Angela Taylor

== Swiss Champions ==
- 1986–87 – EHC Kloten Specials
- 1987–88 – EHC Kloten Specials
- 1988–89 – Grasshopper Club Zürich
- 1989–90 – Grasshopper Club Zürich
- 1990–91 – Grasshopper Club Zürich
- 1991–92 – EHC Bülach
- 1992–93 – SC Lyss
- 1993–94 – DHC Langenthal
- 1994–95 – SC Lyss
- 1995–96 – SC Lyss
- 1996–97 – DHC Lyss
- 1997–98 – EV Zug
- 1998–99 – EV Zug
- 1999–2000 – DSC St. Gallen
- 2000–01 – SC Reinach
- 2001–02 – SC Reinach
- 2002–03 – SC Reinach
- 2003–04 – EV Zug
- 2004–05 – EV Zug
- 2005–06 – Ladies Team Lugano
- 2006–07 – Ladies Team Lugano
- 2007–08 – DHC Langenthal
- 2008–09 – Ladies Team Lugano
- 2009–10 – Ladies Team Lugano
- 2010–11 – ZSC Lions
- 2011–12 – ZSC Lions Frauen
- 2012–13 – ZSC Lions
- 2013–14 – Ladies Team Lugano
- 2014–15 – Ladies Team Lugano
- 2015–16 – ZSC Lions
- 2016–17 – ZSC Lions
- 2017–18 – ZSC Lions
- 2018–19 – Ladies Team Lugano
- 2019–20 – not finished
- 2020–21 – Ladies Team Lugano
- 2021–22 – ZSC Lions
- 2022–23 – ZSC Lions
- 2023–24 – ZSC Lions
- 2024–25 – SC Bern
- 2025–26 – EV Zug

=== Titles by teams ===
	Team	Titles	Years
1	ZSC Lions Frauen (prev. Grasshopper Club Zürich)	12	1989, 1990, 1991, 2011, 2012, 2013, 2016, 2017, 2018, 2022, 2023, 2024
2	HC Ladies Lugano (prev. Ladies Team Lugano)	8	2006, 2007, 2009, 2010, 2014, 2015, 2019, 2021
3	EV Zug	5	1998, 1999, 2004, 2005, 2026
–	DHC Lyss	4	1993, 1995, 1996, 1997
5	SC Reinach	3	2001, 2002, 2003
6	DHC Langenthal	2	1994, 2008
–	EHC Kloten Specials	2	1987, 1988
8	DSC St. Gallen	1	2000
–	EHC Bülach	1	1992

== Awards ==
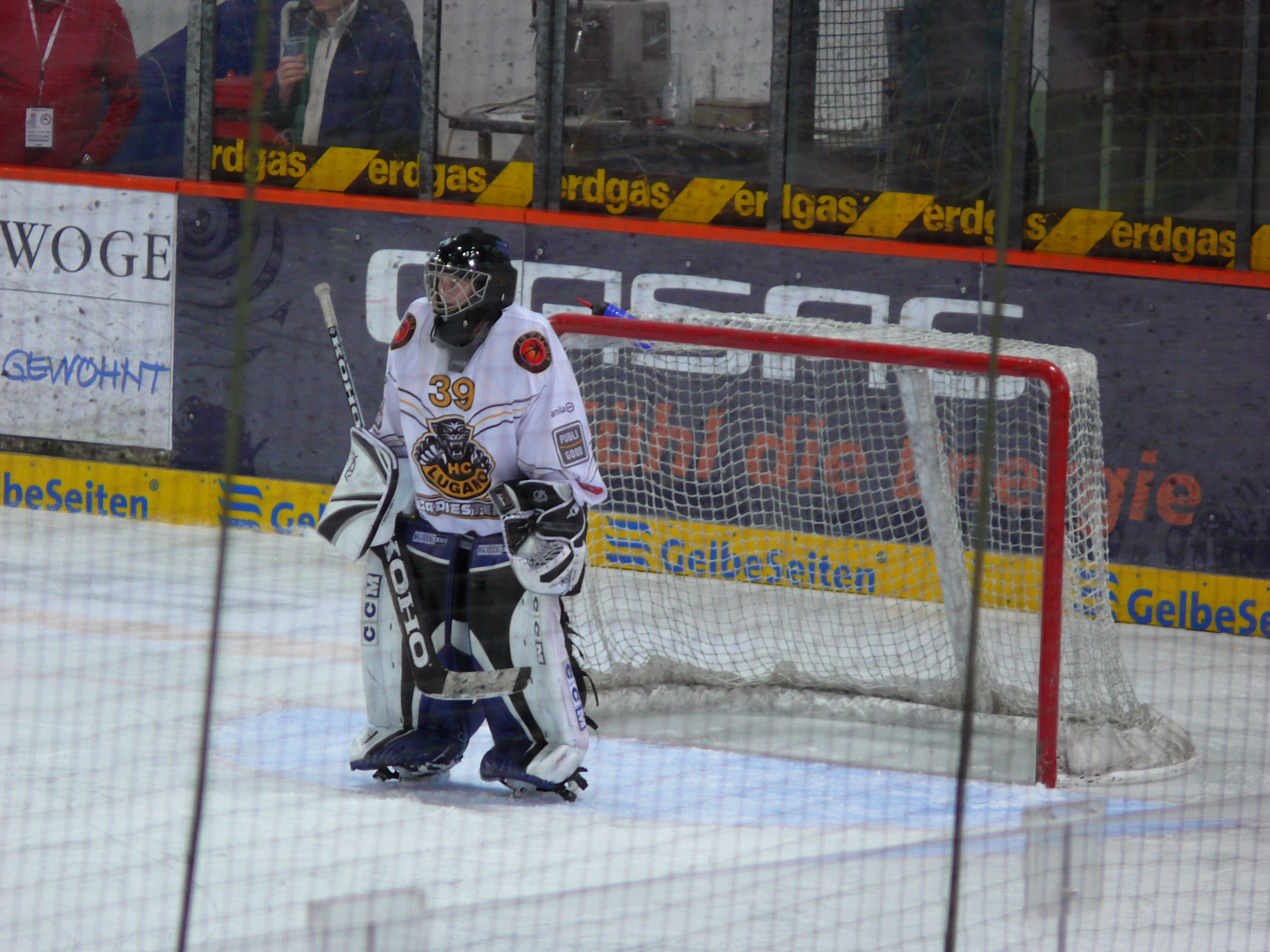
Jessica Müller, one of the 2009–10 MVPs

=== Woman of the Year ===
The Woman of the Year award honours the best active Swiss player, whether she plays in the Swiss league or elsewhere. First awarded by the Swiss Ice Hockey Federation in the 2005–06 season.

- 2005–06: Nicole Bullo, Ladies Team Lugano
- 2006–07: Florence Schelling, ZSC Lions
- 2007–08: Christine Meier, AIK Hockey (Riksserien)
- 2008–09: Christine Meier, ZSC Lions
- 2009–10: Claudia Riechsteiner, SC Reinach
- 2010–11: Nicole Bullo, Ladies Team Lugano
- 2011–12: Nicole Bullo, Ladies Team Lugano
- 2013–14: Florence Schelling, ZSC Lions
- 2014–15: Julia Marty, SC Reinach
- 2015–16: Christine Meier, ZSC Lions
- 2016–17: Lara Stalder, Linköping HC (SDHL)
- 2017–18: Alina Müller, ZSC Lions
- 2018–19: Alina Müller, Northeastern Huskies (NCAA D1)
- 2019–20: Not awarded
- 2020–21: Lara Stalder, Brynäs IF (SDHL) – runners up: Andrea Brändli (Ohio State Buckeyes), Alina Müller (Northeastern Huskies)
- 2021–22: Alina Müller, Northeastern Huskies (NCAA D1) – runners up: Andrea Brändli (Ohio State Buckeyes), Lara Stalder (Brynäs IF)
- 2022–23: Andrea Brändli, Boston University Terriers (NCAA D1) – runners up: Alina Müller (Northeastern Huskies), Lara Stalder (Brynäs IF)
- 2023–24: Alina Müller, PWHL Boston (PWHL) – runners up: Sinja Leemann (ZSC Lions), Lara Stalder (EV Zug)
- 2024–25: Alina Müller, Boston Fleet (PWHL) – runners up: Sinja Leemann (ZSC Lions), Lara Stalder (EV Zug)

=== Most Valuable Player ===
First awarded in the 2009–10 season to the most valuable player of each team in the Swiss Championship playoff final.

- 2009–10: Jessica Müller (Ladies Lugano), Jaclyn Hawkins (ZSC Lions)
- 2010–11: Christine Meier (ZSC Lions), Iveta Koka (Ladies Lugano)

…

- 2013–14: Sophie Anthamatten (Ladies Lugano), Christine Meier (ZSC Lions)
- 2014–15: Céline Abgottspon (Ladies Lugano), Livia Altmann (ZSC Lions)
- 2015–16: Sasha Ronchi (Ladies Lugano), Isabel Waidacher (ZSC Lions)
- 2016–17: Evelina Raselli (Ladies Lugano), Caroline Baldin (ZSC Lions)

== Others women's competitions in Switzerland ==
=== SWHL B ===
The SWHL B is the second tier of the Swiss Women's Hockey League system. It was previously known as the Leistungsklasse B (LKB) in German, the Ligue nationale B in French and the Lega Nazionale B in Italian, both abbreviated as LNB.

The champion of the SWHL B playoffs qualifies for a promotion/relegation series against the bottom team from the Women's League regular season. The winner of the series plays the following season in the Women's League and the loser is relegated to or remains in the SWHL B.

Each season, the team finishing last in the SWHL B is relegated to the SWHL C.

The ten teams participated in the 2025–26 season:

- Brandis-Juniors Ladies, Hasle bei Burgdorf
- DHC Lyss, Lyss
- EHC Bassersdorf, Kloten
- EHC Sursee, Sursee
- EHC Thun, Thun
- EHC Worb, Worb
- EHC Zunzgen-Sissach, Sissach
- GCK Lions Frauen, Küsnacht
- Lausanne HC Féminin, Lausanne
- SC Rapperswil-Jona Lakers, Rapperswil-Jona

=== SWHL C ===
The SWHL C is the third tier of the Swiss Women's Hockey League system. It was previously known as the Leistungsklasse C (LKC) in German, the Ligue nationale C (LNC) in French and the Lega Nazionale C in Italian.

The regular season is played with two closed divisions of eight teams each.

The team finishing first is declared SWHL C champion and is promoted to SWHL B.

Fifteen teams participated in the 2025–26 season:

- Genève-Servette HC Féminin, Geneva
- Dragon Queens, Wichtrach
- EHC Post Bern Damen, Bern
- EHC Schaffhausen, Schaffhausen
- EHC Wallisellen, Wallisellen
- EHC Wetzikon, Wetzikon
- HC Ajoie Les Panthères, Porrentruy
- HC Eisbären St. Gallen Queens, St. Gallen
- HC Saint-Imier, Saint-Imier
- HC Valais Academy Girls, Sierre
- HC Thurgau Ladies, Weinfelden
- Hockey Chicas Engiadina, Scuol
- Hockey Country, Emmental
- Neuchâtel Hockey Academy II, Neuchâtel
- SC Celerina, Celerina
- ZSC Lions Girls, Zurich

=== Fourth division (SWHL D) ===
The SWHL D is the fourth tier of the Swiss Women's Hockey League system.

For the 2023–24 season, there are fifteen participating teams:

- Lausanne HC Féminin
- SC Rapperswil-Jona Lady Lakers
- EHC Schaffhausen Damen
- Neuchâtel Hockey Academy 1999
- Argovia Stars Frauen
- CP Fleurier Féminin
- CP Meyrin Équipe Féminine
- EHC Rot-Blau Bern-Bümpliz Damen
- EHC Thun Damen
- EHC Zuchwil Regio Ladies
- HC Ajoie Les Panthères
- HC La Chaux-de-Fonds Féminin
- HC Luzern Damen
- HC Monthey-Chablais Féminin
- HC Prilly-Lausanne Féminin

== National Cup ==
The National Cup Frauen ('National Cup Women'), familiarity known as the Swiss Women's Hockey Cup, is a non-league tournament open to any Swiss women's ice hockey team. Teams do not have to be active in a SWHL league to participate. The number of teams permitted to compete for the cup is not limited and generally exceeds thirty teams, though it has exceeded forty teams on multiple occasions.

The competition was officially called the Swiss Women Cup until 2020, and was also called the Ochsner Hockey Swiss Women Cup for sponsorship reasons.

=== Cup champions ===
- 2005–06 – HC Lugano Ladies
- 2006–07 – not contested
- 2007–08 – DHC Langenthal
- 2008–09 – ZSC Lions
- 2009–10 – DHC Langenthal
- 2010–11 – ZSC Lions
- 2011–12 – ZSC Lions
- 2012–13 – ZSC Lions
- 2013–14 – ZSC Lions
- 2014–15: not contested
- 2015–16: ZSC Lions
- 2016–17: HC Lugano Ladies
- 2017–18: ZSC Lions
- 2018–19: ZSC Lions
- 2019–20: ZSC Lions
- 2020–21:
- 2021–22: Ladies Team Lugano
- 2022–23: ZSC Lions
- 2023–24: SC Bern
- 2024–25: EV Zug
- 2025–26: EV Zug

== See also ==
- Switzerland women's national ice hockey team
