= 2015–16 SWHL A season =

- League: Swiss Women's League A
- Sport: Ice hockey
- Duration: September 16, 2015 – January 26, 2016
- Number of games: 60
- Number of teams: 6

Regular Season
- Season Champions: ZSC Lions Frauen
- Season MVP: Sasha Ronchi (Ladies Team Lugano); Isabel Waidacher (ZSC Lions Frauen)
- Top scorer: (Switzerland) Christine Hüni

Playoffs

Women's League champion
- Champions: ZSC Lions Frauen
- Runners-up: Ladies Team Lugano

Swiss Women's League A seasons
- ← 2014–15 2016–17 →

The 2015–16 Swiss League season was the 30th season of the Swiss Women's League A.

== Teams ==
Swiss League teams for the 2015–16 season

Team	Trainer	City	Arena	Capacity
Ladies Team Lugano	Marzio Brambilla	Lugano	La Resega	7,200
HC Université Neuchâtel Dames	Yan Gigon	Neuchâtel	Patinoire du Littoral	7,000
SC Reinach Damen	Bernhard Bachmann	Reinach	Kunsteisbahn Oberwynental	-
EV Bomo Thun	Lolita Andrisevska	Thun	Kunsteisbahn Grabengut	4,000
SC Weinfelden Ladies	Daniel Zbinden	Weinfelden	Güttingersreuti	3,100
ZSC Lions Frauen	Daniela Diaz	Zürich	Kunsteisbahn Oerlikon	1,700

== Regular season ==
The regular season started on 16 September 2015 and ended on 26 January 2016. The SWHL A game mode provides a preliminary round (phase 1) with 10 matches per team and a Masterround with 10 additional matches per team. The top 4 teams qualify for the playoffs and the bottom two compete for a play-off against relegation. The loser must face the SWHLB champion.

Pos	Team	Pld	W	OTW	OTL	L	GF	GA	GD	Pts	Qualification
1	ZSC Lions Frauen	20	19	1	0	0	136	32	+104	59	Advance to Playoffs
2	Ladies Team Lugano	20	13	1	0	6	85	46	+39	41	Advance to Playoffs
3	HC Université Neuchâtel Dames	20	12	0	1	7	92	59	+33	37	Advance to Playoffs
4	EV Bomo Thun	20	9	0	1	10	65	76	−11	28	Advance to Playoffs
5	SC Reinach Damen	20	4	0	0	16	38	91	−53	12	
6	SC Weinfelden Ladies	20	1	0	0	19	24	136	−112	3	

Rules for classification: 1) points; 2) a higher number of wins in the regular time; 3) a higher number of wins in overtime and shootouts; 4) goal difference; 5) number of goals scored; 6) drawing of lots.

=== Statistics ===
==== Scoring leaders ====
The following shows the top ten players who led the league in points, at the conclusion of the regular season. If two or more skaters are tied (i.e. same number of points, goals and played games), all of the tied skaters are shown.

Player	Team	GP	G	A	Pts	PIM
(Switzerland) Christine Meier	ZSC Lions Frauen	14	24	24	45	2
(Switzerland) Stefanie Marty	HC Université Neuchâtel Dames	18	22	20	42	6
(Canada) Jennifer More	EV Bomo Thun	18	18	17	35	2
(Switzerland) Isabel Waidacher	ZSC Lions Frauen	14	17	18	35	14
(Switzerland) Nina Waidacher	ZSC Lions Frauen	17	17	17	34	36
(United States) Jennifer Anne Gallo	EV Bomo Thun	18	21	10	31	16
(Switzerland) Bettina Meyer	Ladies Team Lugano	19	18	10	28	36
(Switzerland) Evelina Raselli	Ladies Team Lugano	20	10	18	28	10
(Canada) Breehan Hochuli	HC Université Neuchâtel Dames	20	16	10	26	16
(Switzerland) Anja Stiefel	Ladies Team Lugano	19	12	12	24	2

==== Leading goaltenders ====
The following shows the top five goaltenders who led the league in goals against average, provided that they have played at least 40% of their team's minutes, at the conclusion of the regular season.

Player	Team(s)	GP	TOI	GA	GAA
(France) Caroline Baldin	ZSC Lions Frauen	12	688	14	1,39
(Switzerland) Mélina Desboeufs	Ladies Team Lugano	10	600	23	2,37
(Switzerland) Sasha Ronchi	Ladies Team Lugano	14	737	35	2,74
(Switzerland) Vanessa Bolinger	EV Bomo Thun	12	725	39	2,83
(France) Mathilde Bopp	HC Université Neuchâtel Dames	14	813	43	2,97

== Playoffs ==
=== Bracket ===
Semi-finals (best-of-5)
1	ZSC Lions Frauen	3
4	EV Bomo Thun	0
2	Ladies Team Lugano	3
3	HC Université Neuchâtel Dames	0

Finals (best-of-5)
1	ZSC Lions Frauen	3
2	Ladies Team Lugano	1
Game for 3rd place (best-of-1)
3	HC Université Neuchâtel Dames	7
4	EV Bomo Thun	2

=== Semi-Finals ===
==== (1) ZSC Lions Frauen vs. (4) EV Bomo Thun ====
30 January	EV Bomo Thun	2-3	OT	ZSC Lions Frauen	Kunsteisbahn Grabengut, Thun	Recap
3:31 - Heuscher (Schwarz)		First period		No scoring
27:10 - More (Schranz, Hänggi)		Second period		No scoring
No scoring		Third period		Meier (Hakala) - 44:01; I. Waidacher (N. Waidacher) - 51:31
No scoring		First overtime period		Frautschi - 67:46
Vanessa Bolinger		Goalie stats		Caroline Baldin

31 January	ZSC Lions Frauen	6-3	EV Bomo Thun	Kunsteisbahn Oerlikon, Zürich	Recap
Meier (N. Waidacher) - 7:03		First period	4:02 - Gallo (Rensch) (PP1)
Meier (N. Waidacher) (PP1) - 31:33; Zollinger (N. Waidacher) - 32:51; Beiter (Hakala) - 34:37; N. Waidacher (Meier) - 36:42		Second period	No scoring
Zollinger - 59:33		Third period	47:35 - Gallo (Minder) (PP1); 49:17 - Gallo (More)
Caroline Baldin		Goalie stats	Vanessa Bolinger

6 February	ZSC Lions Frauen	5-0	EV Bomo Thun	Kunsteisbahn Oerlikon, Zürich	Recap
No scoring		First period	No scoring
Beiter (Taylor) - 25:40		Second period	No scoring
Beiter (Meier) - 46:19; Sigrist (Beiter) - 49:09; N. Waidacher (Meier) (PP1) - 54:40; Taylor - 56:32		Third period	No scoring
Caroline Baldin		Goalie stats	Vanessa Bolinger

ZSC Lions Frauen won the series 3–0

==== (2) Ladies Team Lugano vs. (3) HC Université Neuchâtel Dames ====
30 January	Ladies Team Lugano	5-2	HC Université Neuchâtel Dames	La Resega, Lugano	Recap
Eggimann (Stiefel) - 14:35		First period	No scoring
Bullo (Meyer) - 24:40; Eggimann (Bouché) - 37:32		Second period	22:23 - Hochuli (Marty)
Raselli (Bouché) - 43:09; Raselli (Meyer) - 55:16		Third period	59:59 - Hochuli (Pankowski)
Sasha Ronchi		Goalie stats	Isabella Vuignier

31 January	HC Université Neuchâtel Dames	1-2	Ladies Team Lugano	Patinoire du Littoral, Neuchâtel	Recap
No scoring		First period	Raselli - 5:27
39:17 - Marty (Hochuli)		Second period	Bullo - 26:12
No scoring		Third period	No scoring
Larissa Friant		Goalie stats	Sasha Ronchi

6 February	Ladies Team Lugano	7-6	OT	HC Université Neuchâtel Dames	La Resega, Lugano	Recap
No scoring		First period		10:15 - Marty (Pankowski) (PP1); 16:52 - Marty (Pankowski)
Eggimann (Stiefel) - 23:29; Stiefel (Desboeufs) - 31:01; Stiefel (Abgottspon) - 34:03		Second period		26:04 - Pankowski (Marty)
Stiefel (Desboeufs, Eggimann) (PP1) - 41:16; Bouché (Meyer) - 48:47; Bouché (Raselli) - 52:55		Third period		47:31 - Quennec (Fortin); 54:24 - Forster (Marty); 55:32 - Hochuli (Forster, Marty)
Eggimann (Stiefel) - 69:57		First overtime period		No scoring
[[]]		Goalie stats		[[]]

Ladies Team Lugano won the series 3–0

=== Game for 3rd place ===
20 February	HC Université Neuchâtel Dames	7-2	EV Bomo Thun	Patinoire du Littoral, Neuchâtel	Recap
Hochuli (Ryser) - 7:32; Williner (Marty) - 19:35		First period	16:23 - Gerber (Gallo)
Anex (Fortin) (PP1) - 23:35; Hochuli - 24:49; Marty (Ryser) - 33:07		Second period	39:55 - Schranz (More, Rensch)
Marty (Pankowski) (PP1) - 48:18; Ryser - 55:19		Third period	No scoring
Isabella Vuignier		Goalie stats	Vanessa Bolinger

HC Université Neuchâtel Dames won the game and finish at the 3rd place.

=== Finals ===
20 February	ZSC Lions Frauen	3-2	OT	Ladies Team Lugano	Kunsteisbahn Oerlikon, Zürich	Recap
I. Waidacher (Frautschi) - 6:46; Meier (N. Waidacher, I. Waidacher) - 13:40		First period		No scoring
No scoring		Second period		20:43 - Raselli (Buser); 36:36 - Stiefel (Eggimann)
No scoring		Third period		No scoring
I. Waidacher (Meier) - 72:38		First overtime period		No scoring
Caroline Baldin		Goalie stats		Sasha Ronchi

21 February	Ladies Team Lugano	4-3	OT	ZSC Lions Frauen	La Resega, Lugano	Recap
12:48 - Stiefel (Abgottspon )		First period		Taylor (I. Waidacher, Meier) - 17:21
No scoring		Second period		Meier (Rüedi, N. Waidacher) - 37:42; N. Waidacher (Meier, Rüedi) - 38:08
43:26 - Stiefel (Eggimann); 57:44 - Stiefel (Ballardini, Bouché)		Third period		No scoring
67:31 - Bouché (Raselli)		First overtime period		No scoring
Sasha Ronchi		Goalie stats		Caroline Baldin

27 February	ZSC Lions Frauen	2-1	Ladies Team Lugano	Kunsteisbahn Oerlikon, Zürich	Recap
Meier (Taylor) (PP1) - 5:24		First period	10:49 - Stiefel (Raselli) (PP1)
I. Waidacher (Frautschi) - 20:21		Second period	No scoring
No scoring		Third period	No scoring
Caroline Baldin		Goalie stats	Sophie Anthamatten

28 February	Ladies Team Lugano	1-5	ZSC Lions Frauen	La Resega, Lugano	Recap
No scoring		First period	No scoring
36:03 - Bullo (PP1)		Second period	Meier (Taylor) (PP1) - 21:17; M. Waidacher (Meier, Nabholz) - 29:02; Meier (Zollinger) - 32:12
No scoring		Third period	I. Waidacher (Meier) - 49:19; Nabholz - 57:27
Sophie Anthamatten		Goalie stats	Caroline Baldin

ZSC Lions Frauen won the series 3–1.

The two designated MVPs are: Sasha Ronchi for Ladies Team Lugano and Isabel Waidacher for ZSC Lions Frauen.

=== Team of Swiss champions ===
Goalkeepers: Caroline Baldin, Isabelle Michel

Defense: Livia Altmann, Laura Benz, Angela Frautschi, Kirsti Hakala, Nadine Hofstetter, Shannon Sigrist, Reica Staiger

Offense: Eva Beiter, Rahel Enzler, Linn Fäsch, Christine Meier, Katrin Nabholz, Andrea Odermatt, Rüedi, Dominique Rüegg, Noemi Ryhner, Angela Taylor, Isabel Waidacher, Monika Waidacher, Nina Waidacher, Sabrina Zollinger

Coaching: Daniela Diaz

== Play-outs ==
30 January	SC Reinach Damen	4-0	SC Weinfelden Ladies	Kunsteisbahn Oberwynental, Reinach	Recap
No scoring		First period	No scoring
Poschung (PP1) - 39:02		Second period	No scoring
R. Bräm (Grascher) - 56:08; Troxler (Grascher) - 58:58; Poschung (R. Jaramillo) - 59:12		Third period	No scoring
Delia Häcki		Goalie stats	Angela Ulmann-Moor

31 January	SC Weinfelden Ladies	2-3	OT	SC Reinach Damen	Güttingersreuti, Weinfelden	Recap
No scoring		First period		No scoring
21:05 - Szilágyi (Kiss, Wuttke) (PP2)		Second period		Grascher (C. Bräm) (PP1) - 32:32
54:42 - Szilágyi (Dierauer)		Third period		C. Jaramillo (Müller) - 55:43
No scoring		First overtime period		Poschung (Flachsova) (PP1) - 65:35
Angela Ulmann-Moor		Goalie stats		Delia Häcki

6 February	SC Reinach Damen	4-2	SC Weinfelden Ladies	Kunsteisbahn Oberwynental, Reinach
Grascher (Flachsova) - 3:49; Thalmann - 10:13		First period	No scoring
Poschung (C. Bräm, Nienaber) - 26:16		Second period	25:34 - Michielin (Hugentobler); 38:06 - Michielin
Emmenegger (Müller) - 41:59		Third period	No scoring
Delia Häcki		Goalie stats	Angela Ulmann-Moor

SC Reinach Damen won the series 3–0

Normally, SC Weinfelden Ladies must face the champion of SWHL B to maintain their position, but EHC Brandis Ladies decides to stay in SWHL B, same of last year.
