= 2014–15 SWHL A season =

- League: Swiss Women's League A
- Sport: Ice hockey
- Duration: September 20, 2014 – February 1, 2015
- Games: 60
- Teams: 6

Regular Season
- Season Champions: Ladies Team Lugano
- Top scorer: (Canada) Isabel Ménard

Playoffs
- Playoffs MVP: Celine Abgottspon (Ladies Team Lugano); Livia Altmann (ZSC Lions Frauen)

Women's League champion
- Champions: Ladies Team Lugano
- Runners-up: ZSC Lions Frauen

Swiss Women's League A seasons
- ← 2013–14 2015–16 →

The 2014–15 Swiss League season was the 29th season of the Swiss Women's League A.

== Teams ==
Swiss League teams for the 2014–15 season

| Team | Trainer | City | Arena | Capacity |
|---|---|---|---|---|
| Ladies Team Lugano | Marzio Brambilla | Lugano | La Resega | 7,200 |
| HC Université Neuchâtel Dames | Yan Gigon | Neuchâtel | Patinoire du Littoral | 7,000 |
| SC Reinach Damen | Philipp Steiner | Reinach | Kunsteisbahn Oberwynental | - |
| EV Bomo Thun | Lolita Andrisevska | Thun | Kunsteisbahn Grabengut | 4,000 |
| SC Weinfelden Ladies | Daniel Zbinden | Weinfelden | Güttingersreuti | 3,100 |
| ZSC Lions Frauen | Daniela Diaz | Zürich | Kunsteisbahn Oerlikon | 1,700 |

== Regular season ==
The regular season started on 20 September 2014 and ended on 1 February 2015. The SWHL A game mode provides a preliminary round (phase 1) with 10 matches per team and a Masterround with 10 additional matches per team. The top 4 teams qualify for the playoffs and the bottom two compete for a play-off against relegation. The loser must face the SWHLB champion.

| Pos | Team | Pld | W | OTW | OTL | L | GF | GA | GD | Pts | Qualification |
|---|---|---|---|---|---|---|---|---|---|---|---|
| 1 | Ladies Team Lugano | 20 | 17 | 1 | 0 | 2 | 134 | 48 | +86 | 53 | Advance to Playoffs |
| 2 | ZSC Lions Frauen | 20 | 17 | 0 | 2 | 1 | 112 | 44 | +68 | 53 | Advance to Playoffs |
| 3 | SC Reinach Damen | 20 | 8 | 0 | 1 | 11 | 60 | 86 | −26 | 25 | Advance to Playoffs |
| 4 | EV Bomo Thun | 20 | 6 | 2 | 1 | 11 | 43 | 95 | −52 | 23 | Advance to Playoffs |
| 5 | HC Université Neuchâtel Dames | 20 | 6 | 1 | 1 | 12 | 69 | 76 | −7 | 21 | |
| 6 | SC Weinfelden Ladies | 20 | 1 | 1 | 0 | 18 | 32 | 101 | −69 | 5 | |

Rules for classification: 1) points; 2) a higher number of wins in the regular time; 3) a higher number of wins in overtime and shootouts; 4) goal difference; 5) number of goals scored; 6) drawing of lots.

=== Statistics ===
==== Scoring leaders ====
The following shows the top ten players who led the league in points, at the conclusion of the regular season. If two or more skaters are tied (i.e. same number of points, goals and played games), all of the tied skaters are shown.

| Player | Team | GP | G | A | Pts | PIM |
|---|---|---|---|---|---|---|
| (Canada) Isabel Ménard | ZSC Lions Frauen | 20 | 19 | 32 | 51 | 18 |
| (Switzerland) Evelina Raselli | Ladies Team Lugano | 20 | 27 | 19 | 46 | 28 |
| (Canada) Nicole Gifford | Ladies Team Lugano | 20 | 13 | 28 | 41 | 6 |
| (Scotland) Angela Taylor | ZSC Lions Frauen | 18 | 15 | 22 | 37 | 44 |
| (Switzerland) Anja Stiefel | Ladies Team Lugano | 18 | 21 | 15 | 36 | 0 |
| (Switzerland) Christine Meier | ZSC Lions Frauen | 18 | 21 | 12 | 33 | 10 |
| (Czech Republic) Simona Grascher | HC Université Neuchâtel Dames | 19 | 22 | 7 | 29 | 20 |
| (United States) Alyssa Wohlfeiler | Ladies Team Lugano | 18 | 13 | 16 | 29 | 32 |
| (Switzerland) Bettina Meyer | Ladies Team Lugano | 18 | 8 | 18 | 26 | 42 |
| (Switzerland) Sara Benz | ZSC Lions Frauen | 9 | 18 | 6 | 24 | 12 |

==== Leading goaltenders ====
The following shows the top five goaltenders who led the league in goals against average, provided that they have played at least 40% of their team's minutes, at the conclusion of the regular season.

| Player | Team(s) | GP | TOI | GA | GAA |
|---|---|---|---|---|---|
| (Canada) Vanessa Clavadetscher | ZSC Lions Frauen | 12 | 705 | 24 | 2,04 |
| (Switzerland) Luana Jam | Ladies Team Lugano | 15 | 872 | 40 | 2,75 |
| (Switzerland) Larissa Friant | HC Université Neuchâtel Dames | 12 | 730 | 46 | 3,78 |
| (Switzerland) Vanessa Bolinger | EV Bomo Thun | 10 | 570 | 45 | 4,74 |
| (Switzerland) Roxanne Kis | SC Weinfelden Ladies | 12 | 552 | 44 | 4,79 |

== Playoffs ==
=== Bracket ===
Semi-finals (best-of-5)
1 | Ladies Team Lugano | 3
4 | EV Bomo Thun | 0
2 | ZSC Lions Frauen | 3
3 | SC Reinach Damen | 0

Finals (best-of-5)
1 | Ladies Team Lugano | 3
2 | ZSC Lions Frauen | 2
Game for 3rd place (best-of-1)
3 | SC Reinach Damen | 4
4 | EV Bomo Thun | 1

=== Semi-Finals ===
==== (1) Ladies Team Lugano vs. (4) EV Bomo Thun ====
| 14 February | Ladies Team Lugano | 4-3 | EV Bomo Thun | La Resega, Lugano | Recap |
| Stiefel (Meyer, Wohlfeiler) - 18:23 | | First period | 16:43 - Schranz (Rolph, Schindler) |
| Brickner (Desboeufs) - 28:22 | | Second period | 32:54 - Schneiter (Schranz, Rolph) |
| Wohlfeiler (Meyer) - 43:16; Brickner (Bullo) - 56:34 | | Third period | 54:17 - Rolph (Schwarz, Schranz) |
| Luana Jam | | Goalie stats | Vanessa Bolinger |

| 15 February | EV Bomo Thun | 0-5 | Ladies Team Lugano | Kunsteisbahn Grabengut, Thun | Recap |
| No scoring | | First period | 16:43 - Wohlfeiler (Bullo, Buser) |
| No scoring | | Second period | 20:39 - Eggimann (Brickner); 20:55 - Wohlfeiler (Meyer) |
| No scoring | | Third period | 50:22 - Eggimann (Gifford); 55:24 - Wohlfeiler (Stiefel) (PP1) |
| Vanessa Bolinger | | Goalie stats | Sasha Ronchi |

| 1 March | Ladies Team Lugano | 4-3 | EV Bomo Thun | La Resega, Lugano | Recap |
| Meyer (Brickner) - 1:29; Abgottspon (Wohlfeiler, Raselli) - 6:36; Raselli (Eggimann) (PP1) - 7:03 | | First period | No scoring |
| Wohlfeiler (Stiefel) - 37:41 | | Second period | 32:51 - Rolph (Schranz, Schwarz); 36:02 - Cation (Rolph) (PP1) |
| No scoring | | Third period | 52:33 - Rolph (Schwarz) (PP1) |
| Dominique Thierstein-Slongo | | Goalie stats | Luana Jam |

| Ladies Team Lugano won the series 3–0 |

==== (2) ZSC Lions Frauen vs. (3) SC Reinach Damen ====
| 14 February | ZSC Lions Frauen | 7-1 | SC Reinach Damen | Kunsteisbahn Oerlikon, Zürich | Recap |
| Ménard (S. Benz, Taylor) - 10:07; Zollinger (S. Benz, Taylor) - 19:45 | | First period | No scoring |
| S. Benz (Taylor) - 23:47; M. Waidacher (Rüedi) - 27:05; Ménard (Taylor, Zollinger) - 30:35 | | Second period | 25:56 - S. Barmettler (Marty) |
| S. Benz (Nabholz, Ménard) - 59:15; Nabholz (S. Benz, Ménard) - 59:32 | | Third period | No scoring |
| Vanessa Clavadetscher | | Goalie stats | Delia Häcki |

| 15 February | SC Reinach Damen | 3-4 | ZSC Lions Frauen | Kunsteisbahn Oberwynental, Reinach | Recap |
| 15:24 - Zollinger | | First period | Thalmann (Marty) - 14:07 |
| 23:37 - Farstad (Riechsteiner); 28:00 - Farstad (Riechsteiner) | | Second period | Ménard (Taylor, Maschmeyer) - 31:23; Staiger (Altmann, Nabholz) - 34:27 |
| No scoring | | Third period | Ménard (M. Waidacher) - 46:27 |
| Delia Häcki | | Goalie stats | Vanessa Clavadetscher; Isabelle Michel |

| 21 February | ZSC Lions Frauen | 8-3 | SC Reinach Damen | Kunsteisbahn Oerlikon, Zürich | Recap |
| Ménard (L. Benz, Zollinger) (PP1) - 7:02; Taylor (M. Waidacher) (SH1) - 14:32 | | First period | No scoring |
| Ménard (Taylor, S. Benz) - 25:54; Nabholz (Staiger, Taylor) - 28:23; Gubler (Taylor) (PP1) - 34:36 | | Second period | 25:05 - Riechsteiner; 35:34 - Jaramillo (J. Barmettler, Farstad) |
| Ménard (Maschmeyer, Nabholz) - 45:15; Ménard (Taylor) - 48:11; L. Benz (Maschmeyer) - 51:20 | | Third period | 53:12 - Heiz (SH1) |
| Isabelle Michel | | Goalie stats | Delia Häcki |

| ZSC Lions Frauen won the series 3–0 |

=== Game for 3rd place ===
| 8 March | SC Reinach Damen | 4-1 | EV Bomo Thun | Kunsteisbahn Oberwynental, Reinach | Recap |
| C. Bräm - 0:59 | | First period | No scoring |
| Steck (Farstad) - 30:00 Thalmann (Steck, J. Barmettler) - 30:17 | | Second period | No scoring |
| Heiz (C. Jaramillo) - 59:59 | | Third period | 56:08 - Rolph (Schranz, Schwarz) |
| Florence Schelling | | Goalie stats | Dominique Thierstein-Slongo |

| SC Reinach Damen won the game and finish at the 3rd place. |

=== Finals ===
| 7 March | Ladies Team Lugano | 3-4 | OT | ZSC Lions Frauen | La Resega, Lugano | Recap |
| Gifford (Stiefel) - 6:27 | | First period | | No scoring |
| Raselli (Eggimann, Gifford) - 25:23 | | Second period | | 36:40 - Meier (Taylor); 39:07 - Maschmeyer (Taylor, Nabholz) (PP1) |
| Stiefel (Meyer) - 42:21 | | Third period | | 51:20 - Ménard (Taylor) |
| No scoring | | First overtime period | | 66:14 - Zollinger |
| Sophie Anthamatten | | Goalie stats | | Janine Alder |

| 8 March | ZSC Lions Frauen | 1-3 | Ladies Team Lugano | Kunsteisbahn Oerlikon, Zürich | Recap |
| 18:18 - Taylor (Ménard, Staiger) | | First period | Eggimann (Gifford, Desboeufs) - 1:56 |
| No scoring | | Second period | Desboeufs (Eggimann) - 20:30; Gifford (Brickner, Eggimann) (SH1) - 35:03 |
| No scoring | | Third period | No scoring |
| Janine Alder | | Goalie stats | Sophie Anthamatten |

| 14 March | Ladies Team Lugano | 1-2 | OT | ZSC Lions Frauen | La Resega, Lugano | Recap |
| No scoring | | First period | | 18:45 - Meier (L. Benz, Zollinger) |
| Raselli (Gifford, Brickner) - 35:58 | | Second period | | No scoring |
| No scoring | | Third period | | No scoring |
| No scoring | | First overtime period | | 63:41 - L. Benz (Taylor) (PP1) |
| Sophie Anthamatten | | Goalie stats | | Janine Alder |

| 15 March | ZSC Lions Frauen | 2-3 | OT | Ladies Team Lugano | Kunsteisbahn Oerlikon, Zürich | Recap |
| 14:46 - I. Waidacher (Frautschi, Taylor) (PP1) | | First period | | Raselli - 16:20; Stiefel (Wohlfeiler, Bullo) (PP1) - 19:23 |
| No scoring | | Second period | | No scoring |
| 44:16 - Zollinger (L. Benz, Meier) | | Third period | | No scoring |
| No scoring | | First overtime period | | Gifford (Raselli) - 60:40 |
| Janine Alder | | Goalie stats | | Sophie Anthamatten |

| 21 March | Ladies Team Lugano | 4-1 | ZSC Lions Frauen | La Resega, Lugano | Recap |
| Raselli (Bullo, Eggimann) - 5:45 | | First period | 10:06 - Maschmeyer (Meier) |
| Eggimann (Gifford, Raselli) - 24:39; Wohlfeiler (Stiefel) - 39:30 | | Second period | No scoring |
| Wohlfeiler (Bullo) - 55:48 | | Third period | No scoring |
| Sophie Anthamatten | | Goalie stats | Janine Alder |

| Ladies Team Lugano won the series 3–2 |

The two teams dominating the championship logically find themselves in the final. Ladies Team Lugano manages to win a second consecutive title against ZSC Lions Frauen at the end of a series played in 5 games. The two designated MVPs are: Celine Abgottspon for Ladies Team Lugano and Livia Altmann for ZSC Lions Frauen.

=== Team of Swiss champions ===
Goalkeepers: Sophie Anthamatten, Luana Jam, Sasha Ronchi

Defense: Céline Abgottspon, Jordan Brickner, Nicole Bullo, Nathalie Buser, Nicla Gianettoni, Stefanie Steiner

Offense: Claudia Cantamessi, Laura Desboeufs, Romy Eggimann, Nicole Gifford, Petra Melicheríková, Bettina Meyer, Evelina Raselli, Anja Stiefel, Alyssa Wohlfeiler

Coaching: Marzio Brambilla, Iris Müller

== Play-outs ==
| 14 February | HC Université Neuchâtel Dames | 5-2 | SC Weinfelden Ladies | Patinoire du Littoral, Neuchâtel | Recap |
| No scoring | | First period | 10:38 - Hugentobler (Jaatinen, Dierauer) |
| Ryser (Plante, Grascher) - 21:26; Ryser (Tscherrig) - 33:19; Grascher (Joray, Plante) - 33:33 | | Second period | No scoring |
| Joray (Grascher) - 51:29; Joray (Grascher) (SH1) - 55:07 | | Third period | 48:10 - Sigrist (Lehner) |
| Larissa Friant | | Goalie stats | Roxanne Kis |

| 15 February | SC Weinfelden Ladies | 0-3 | HC Université Neuchâtel Dames | Güttingersreuti, Weinfelden | Recap |
| No scoring | | First period | Ryser (Tscherrig) - 14:34 |
| No scoring | | Second period | Grascher (Plante) - 38:42 |
| No scoring | | Third period | Plante (Grascher, Joray) - 53:46 |
| Andrea Brändli | | Goalie stats | Isabella Vuignier |

| 21 February | HC Université Neuchâtel Dames | 3-2 | SC Weinfelden Ladies | Patinoire du Littoral, Neuchâtel | Recap |
| No scoring | | First period | 6:44 - Ruh (Hugentobler) 11:44 - Hugentobler (PP1) |
| Ryser (Quennec, Plante) (PP1) - 30:52 | | Second period | No scoring |
| Grascher (Gyseler) - 52:32 Ryser (Williner, Quennec) - 57:51 | | Third period | No scoring |
| Larissa Friant | | Goalie stats | Roxanne Kis |

| HC Université Neuchâtel Dames won the series 3–0 |

HC Université Neuchâtel Dames saves its place in SWHL A by winning the Play-outs.

Normally, SC Weinfelden Ladies must face the champion of SWHL B to maintain their position, but EHC Brandis Ladies decides to stay in SWHL B for financial reasons.
