= 2016–17 SWHL A season =

- League: Swiss Women's League A
- Sport: Ice hockey
- Duration: September 9, 2016 – February 12, 2017
- Games: 60
- Teams: 6

Regular Season
- Season Champions: ZSC Lions Frauen
- Season MVP: Evelina Raselli (Ladies Team Lugano); Caroline Baldin (ZSC Lions Frauen)
- Top scorer: (Switzerland) Isabel Waidacher

Playoffs

Women's League champion
- Champions: ZSC Lions Frauen
- Runners-up: Ladies Team Lugano

Swiss Women's League A seasons
- ← 2015–16 2017–18 →

The 2016–17 Swiss League season was the 31st season of the Swiss Women's League A.

== Teams ==
Swiss League teams for the 2016–17 season

Team	Trainer	City	Arena	Capacity
Ladies Team Lugano	Marzio Brambilla	Lugano	La Resega	7,200
HC Université Neuchâtel Dames	Yan Gigon, Thierry Bourquin	Neuchâtel	Patinoire du Littoral	7,000
SC Reinach Damen	Melanie Häfliger, Peter Küng	Reinach	Kunsteisbahn Oberwynental	-
EV Bomo Thun	Steve Huard	Thun	Kunsteisbahn Grabengut	4,000
SC Weinfelden Ladies	Daniel Zbinden, Otmar Thöni	Weinfelden	Güttingersreuti	3,100
ZSC Lions Frauen	Christof Amsler, Angela Frautschi	Zürich	Kunsteisbahn Oerlikon	1,700

== Regular season ==
The regular season started on 9 September 2016 and ended on 12 February 2017. The SWHL A game mode provides a preliminary round (phase 1) with 10 matches per team and a Masterround with 10 additional matches per team. The top 4 teams qualify for the playoffs and the bottom two compete for a play-off against relegation. The loser must face the SWHLB champion.

Pos	Team	Pld	W	OTW	OTL	L	GF	GA	GD	Pts	Qualification
1	ZSC Lions Frauen	20	17	0	0	3	155	31	+124	51	Advance to Playoffs
2	Ladies Team Lugano	20	16	0	0	4	127	32	+95	48	Advance to Playoffs
3	HC Université Neuchâtel Dames	20	14	0	0	6	112	69	+43	42	Advance to Playoffs
4	EV Bomo Thun	20	7	0	2	11	59	70	−11	23	Advance to Playoffs
5	SC Weinfelden Ladies	20	3	3	0	14	47	113	−66	15	
6	SC Reinach Damen	20	0	0	1	19	20	205	−185	1	

Rules for classification: 1) points; 2) a higher number of wins in the regular time; 3) a higher number of wins in overtime and shootouts; 4) goal difference; 5) number of goals scored; 6) drawing of lots.

=== Statistics ===
==== Scoring leaders ====
The following shows the top ten players who led the league in points, at the conclusion of the regular season. If two or more skaters are tied (i.e. same number of points, goals and played games), all of the tied skaters are shown.

Player	Team	GP	G	A	Pts	PIM
(Switzerland) Isabel Waidacher	ZSC Lions Frauen	19	24	32	56	14
(Switzerland) Christine Meier	ZSC Lions Frauen	17	29	24	53	6
(Switzerland) Nina Waidacher	ZSC Lions Frauen	18	25	23	48	14
(Canada) Becca Kohler	Ladies Team Lugano	19	31	16	47	14
(Switzerland) Stefanie Marty	HC Université Neuchâtel Dames	18	22	17	39	12
(Switzerland) Dominique Rüegg	ZSC Lions Frauen	20	19	18	37	24
(Switzerland) Evelina Raselli	Ladies Team Lugano	16	17	17	34	8
(Canada) Breehan Hochuli	HC Université Neuchâtel Dames	20	20	13	33	14
(Canada) Carly Payerl	Ladies Team Lugano	19	21	11	32	2
(Scotland) Angela Taylor	ZSC Lions Frauen	17	16	16	32	10

==== Leading goaltenders ====
The following shows the top five goaltenders who led the league in goals against average, provided that they have played at least 40% of their team's minutes, at the conclusion of the regular season.

Player	Team(s)	GP	TOI	GA	GAA
(Switzerland) Laura De Bastiani	ZSC Lions Frauen	12	321	7	1,06
(Italy) Giulia Mazzocchi	Ladies Team Lugano	9	511	10	1,18
(Switzerland) Daria Tognacca	Ladies Team Lugano	5	249	7	1,65
(Switzerland) Jade Dübi	HC Université Neuchâtel Dames	6	360	12	2,00
(France) Caroline Baldin	ZSC Lions Frauen	17	877	20	2,11

== Playoffs ==
=== Bracket ===
Semi-finals (best-of-5)
1	ZSC Lions Frauen	3
4	EV Bomo Thun	0
2	Ladies Team Lugano	3
3	HC Université Neuchâtel Dames	1

Finals (best-of-5)
1	ZSC Lions Frauen	3
2	Ladies Team Lugano	0
Game for 3rd place (best-of-5)
3	HC Université Neuchâtel Dames	1
4	EV Bomo Thun	3

=== Semi-Finals ===
==== (1) ZSC Lions Frauen vs. (4) EV Bomo Thun ====
28 January	ZSC Lions Frauen	2-1	EV Bomo Thun	Kunsteisbahn Oerlikon, Zürich	Recap
No scoring		First period	4:17 - Escudero (Schranz)
I. Waidacher (Meier) - 38:44		Second period	No scoring
N. Waidacher (Meier) - 50:23		Third period	No scoring
Caroline Baldin		Goalie stats	Mélyna Desboeufs

29 January	EV Bomo Thun	0-3	ZSC Lions Frauen	Kunsteisbahn Grabengut, Thun	Recap
No scoring		First period	Benz (Zollinger) - 12:43; Meier (Zollinger, Taylor) (PP1) - 15:17
No scoring		Second period	No scoring
No scoring		Third period	I. Waidacher (Meier) - 48:33
Mélyna Desboeufs		Goalie stats	Caroline Baldin; Laura De Bastiani

18 February	ZSC Lions Frauen	4-0	EV Bomo Thun	Kunsteisbahn Oerlikon, Zürich	Recap
Odermatt (Meier, Benz) - 4:00		First period	No scoring
Meier (Rüegg, Sigrist) - 25:06		Second period	No scoring
Meier (Gass, Staiger) - 44:30; Meier (Benz, Ryhner) (PP1) - 46:08		Third period	No scoring
Caroline Baldin		Goalie stats	Mélyna Desboeufs

ZSC Lions Frauen won the series 3–0

==== (2) Ladies Team Lugano vs. (3) HC Université Neuchâtel Dames ====
28 January	Ladies Team Lugano	3-2	OT	HC Université Neuchâtel Dames	La Resega, Lugano	Recap
No scoring		First period		No scoring
Kohler (Raselli) (PP1) - 24:52		Second period		No scoring
Eggimann (Bullo) - 47:35		Third period		53:53 - S. Marty (Forster, Huwiler); 58:55 - S. Marty (Forster, Fortin) (PP1)
Eggimann (Pagnamenta) - 62:37		First overtime period		No scoring
Giulia Mazzocchi		Goalie stats		Larissa Friant

29 January	HC Université Neuchâtel Dames	5-3	Ladies Team Lugano	Patinoire du Littoral, Neuchâtel	Recap
No scoring		First period	Meyer (Payerl) (PP1) - 10:16
22:27 - S. Marty (Forster, J. Marty) (PP1); 26:24 - Fortin (SH1)		Second period	Pagnamenta (Kohler) - 27:54
46:45 - Hochuli (Fortin) (PP1); 52:41 - Berta (Joray) (PP1); 59:56 - J. Marty (Hochuli)		Third period	Meyer (Raselli ) (PP1) - 49:59
Larissa Friant		Goalie stats	Giulia Mazzocchi

18 February	Ladies Team Lugano	9-2	HC Université Neuchâtel Dames	La Resega, Lugano	Recap
Eggimann (Raselli) - 0:35; Kohler (Orlandini) - 2:52; Raselli (Vallario) - 9:10		First period	5:52 - Fortin (Forster, Joray)
Scheidegger (Galtieri) - 22:27; Raselli - 25:36; Kohler (Payerl) - 36:27; Raselli (Eggimann, Desboeufs) - 38:10; Eggimann (Bullo) - 39:33		Second period	28:35 - S. Marty
Eggimann (Meyer, Buser) - 50:54		Third period	No scoring
Giulia Mazzocchi		Goalie stats	Larissa Friant; Isabella Vuignier

19 February	HC Université Neuchâtel Dames	4-6	Ladies Team Lugano	Patinoire du Littoral, Neuchâtel
No scoring		First period	Raselli (Kohler) (PP1) - 19:04
No scoring		Second period	Bullo (Meyer) (PP1) - 30:59; Eggimann (Bullo) - 33:46; Meyer (Raselli) - 36:57
46:02 - Fortin (S. Marty) (PP1); 48:51 - Hochuli (S. Marty); 53:09 - Hochuli (S. Marty); 55:40 - S. Marty (Forster) (PP1)		Third period	Galtieri (Raselli) - 48:38; Raselli (Bullo) - 57:53
Larissa Friant		Goalie stats	Giulia Mazzocchi

Ladies Team Lugano won the series 3–1

=== Game for 3rd place ===
4 March	HC Université Neuchâtel Dames	1-3	EV Bomo Thun	Patinoire du Littoral, Neuchâtel	Recap
No scoring		First period	No scoring
S. Marty (J. Marty, Hochuli) - 35:56		Second period	No scoring
No scoring		Third period	51:37 - Escudero (Allemann, Rensch) 57:47 - Escudero (Allemann, Rensch); 59:06 - Österlund (Allemann, Minder)
Larissa Friant		Goalie stats	Mélyna Desboeufs

EV Bomo Thun won the game and finish at the 3rd place.

=== Finals ===
25 February	ZSC Lions Frauen	4-3	Ladies Team Lugano	Kunsteisbahn Oerlikon, Zürich	Recap
I. Waidacher (N. Waidacher) - 4:50		First period	No scoring
I. Waidacher (N. Waidacher) - 33:59; Meier (I. Waidacher) - 36:36		Second period	20:53 - Desboeufs (Payerl); 28:07 - Eggimann (Raselli)
Meier (I. Waidacher, Staiger) - 44:07		Third period	52:03 - Meyer (Buser)
Caroline Baldin		Goalie stats	Giulia Mazzocchi

4 March	Ladies Team Lugano	2-4	ZSC Lions Frauen	La Resega, Lugano	Recap
No scoring		First period	No scoring
31:55 - Payerl (Raselli) (PP2)		Second period	Meier (N. Waidacher, I. Waidacher) - 25:42; I. Waidacher (Zollinger) (SH1) - 39:43
41:41 - Payerl (Kohler)		Third period	Benz (N. Waidacher) - 51:17; Rüegg (Ryhner, Zollinger) (PP1) - 56:49
Giulia Mazzocchi		Goalie stats	Caroline Baldin

5 March	ZSC Lions Frauen	3-0	Ladies Team Lugano	Kunsteisbahn Oerlikon, Zürich	Recap
No scoring		First period	No scoring
No scoring		Second period	No scoring
Taylor (Meier) (PP1) - 55:09; Taylor - 57:47; N. Waidacher (I. Waidacher, Taylor) (PP1) - 59:54		Third period	No scoring
Caroline Baldin		Goalie stats	Giulia Mazzocchi

ZSC Lions Frauen won the series 3–0

The two designated MVPs are: Evelina Raselli for Ladies Team Lugano and Caroline Baldin for ZSC Lions Frauen.

=== Team of Swiss champions ===
Goalkeepers: Caroline Baldin, Laura De Bastiani

Defense: Laura Benz, Christy Blackburne, Nicole Gass, Nadine Hofstetter, Shannon Sigrist, Reica Staiger, Sabrina Zollinger

Offense: Christine Meier, Katrin Nabholz, Andrea Odermatt, Anna Rüedi, Dominique Rüegg, Noemi Ryhner, Angela Taylor, Isabel Waidacher, Monika Waidacher, Nina Waidacher

Coaching: Christof Amsler, Angela Frautschi

== Play-outs ==
28 January	SC Weinfelden Ladies	2-0	SC Reinach Damen	Güttingersreuti, Weinfelden	Recap
Leemann (Zimmermann) - 5:34 A. Kiss (Richter) - 15:06		First period	No scoring
No scoring		Second period	No scoring
No scoring		Third period	No scoring
Roxanne Kis		Goalie stats	Vanessa Bolinger

29 January	SC Reinach Damen	4-2	SC Weinfelden Ladies	Kunsteisbahn Oberwynental, Reinach	Recap
8:20 - Thalmann (Haudenschild); 14:05 - C. Bräm (Lane, Thalmann ) (PP1)		First period	Farkas (A. Kiss, Ehrbar) (PP2) - 10:58; Gischig (Weiss) - 14:17
37:06 - Dale (C. Bräm) (SH1); 38:42 - C. Bräm (Haudenschild)		Second period	No scoring
No scoring		Third period	No scoring
Vanessa Bolinger		Goalie stats	Roxanne Kis

18 February	SC Weinfelden Ladies	5-3	SC Reinach Damen	Güttingersreuti, Weinfelden	Recap
Leemann (A. Kiss) - 1:30; Leemann (A. Kiss) - 12:55		First period	4:31 - Lane (Thalmann, Dale) (PP1); 15:29 - Haudenschild (Dale)
Trachsel - 22:04; A. Kiss (Lötscher, Trachsel) (PP2) - 39:44		Second period	No scoring
Leemann - 59:49		Third period	59:20 - Gubler (R. Bräm) (PP1)
Roxanne Kis		Goalie stats	Vanessa Bolinger

19 February	SC Reinach Damen	4-0	SC Weinfelden Ladies	Kunsteisbahn Oberwynental, Reinach	Recap
11:16 - Lane (R. Bräm) (PP2); 12:05 - C. Bräm (PP1)		First period	No scoring
No scoring		Second period	No scoring
43:42 - R. Bräm (Thalmann) (PP1); 57:21 - Lutz (Thalmann)		Third period	No scoring
Vanessa Bolinger		Goalie stats	Roxanne Kis

25 February	SC Weinfelden Ladies	3-4	OT	SC Reinach Damen	Güttingersreuti, Weinfelden	Recap
Trachsel (Richter) (PP1) - 6:42; Müller (Trachsel) (PP1) - 17:26		First period		10:53 - Thalmann (Lutz)
No scoring		Second period		21:25 - Dale (Lane) (PP1); 29:47 - Thalmann (Dale) (PP1)
Trachsel (Gischig) (PP1) - 59:33		Third period		No scoring
No scoring		First overtime period		68:10 - Gubler (Lane)
Roxanne Kis		Goalie stats		Vanessa Bolinger

SC Reinach Damen won the series 3–2

SC Reinach Damen saves its place in SWHL A by winning the Play-outs.

== Promotion/Relegation ==
The champion of SWHL B, the GCK Lions, being the farm team of the ZSC Lions and the vice-champion, the EHC Brandis, having not requested to be eligible in SWHL A, the SC Langenthal having finished bronze medalist will play the promotion against the SC Weinfelden Ladies.

11 March	SC Weinfelden Ladies	7-1	SC Langenthal Ladies	Güttingersreuti, Weinfelden	Recap
Lötscher (Wetli, Trachsel) - 2:50; A. Kiss (Weiss, Farkas) - 4:01		First period	No scoring
A. Kiss (Krause, Gischig) (PP1) - 32:44; Dierauer (Ehrbar, Richter) - 36:48; Richter (Weiss) - 38:14		Second period	30:23 - Fankhauser (Hauhia, Bürgin)
Farkas - 50:40; Dierauer (Gischig) (PP1) - 51:23		Third period	No scoring
Roxanne Kis		Goalie stats	Nina Claudia Thomet

12 March	SC Langenthal Ladies	1-5	SC Weinfelden Ladies	Schoren Halle, Langenthal	Recap
No scoring		First period	No scoring
No scoring		Second period	A. Kiss (Krause) - 26:28 Lötscher (Müller) (PP1) - 35:36; A. Kiss (Ehrbar) - 35:45
59:00 - Gäggeler (Siegenthaler, Nyffeler)		Third period	Wuttke (A. Kiss) - 47:53 A. Kiss (Farkas) - 49:56
Nina Claudia Thomet		Goalie stats	Roxanne Kis

SC Weinfelden Ladies won the series 2–0

SC Weinfelden Ladies saves its place in SWHL A by winning the Promotion/Relegation.
