= Céline Abgottspon =

Swiss ice hockey player (born 1995)

- Born: 24 November 1995 (age 30) Staldenried, Switzerland
- Height: 5 ft 8 in (173 cm)
- Weight: 168 lb (76 kg; 12 st 0 lb)
- Position: Defence
- Shoots: Left
- LNA team Former teams: HC Lugano; EHC Visp Lions; EV Bomo Thun
- National team: Switzerland
- Playing career: 2008–present

Céline Abgottspon (born 24 November 1995) is a Swiss ice hockey player for HC Lugano and the Swiss national team.

She participated at the 2015 IIHF Women's World Championship.

== Career statistics ==
=== Club ===
			Regular season					Playoffs
Season	Team	League	GP	G	A	Pts	PIM	GP	G	A	Pts	PIM
2009-10	Ladies Team Lugano	SWHL A	18	1	5	6	6	5	0	0	0	2
2010-11	Ladies Team Lugano	SWHL A	20	10	7	17	12	6	0	2	2	4
2011-12	Ladies Team Lugano	SWHL A	19	13	5	18	12	7	5	2	7	0
2012-13	Ladies Team Lugano	SWHL A	20	10	21	31	24	9	3	5	8	4
2013-14	Ladies Team Lugano	SWHL A	19	18	11	29	14	6	4	10	14	4
2014-15	Ladies Team Lugano	SWHL A	15	15	9	24	6	8	4	5	9	8
2015-16	Ladies Team Lugano	SWHL A	19	10	4	14	20	7	4	3	7	6
2016-17	Ladies Team Lugano	SWHL A	15	9	9	18	22	7	7	1	8	4
2016-17	Ladies Team Lugano	Swiss Women Cup	3	7	2	9	6	-	-	-	-	-
2017-18	Ladies Team Lugano	SWHL A	20	20	13	33	28	6	4	4	8	10
2017-18	Ladies Team Lugano	Swiss Women Cup	1	1	0	1	0	-	-	-	-	-
2018-19	Ladies Team Lugano	SWHL A	20	19	31	50	16	7	4	3	7	6
2018-19	Ladies Team Lugano	Swiss Women Cup	4	5	6	11	2	-	-	-	-	-
2019-20	Ladies Team Lugano	SWHL A	20	25	10	35	12	5	2	0	2	6
2019-20	Ladies Team Lugano	Swiss Women Cup	3	6	5	11	2	-	-	-	-	-
2020-21	Ladies Team Lugano	SWHL A	20	5	7	12	28	8	2	0	2	4
2021-22	Ladies Team Lugano	SWHL A	22	12	16	28	8	3	0	1	1	0
2021-22	Ladies Team Lugano	National Cup	3	3	3	6	0	-	-	-	-	-
2022-23	Ladies Team Lugano	SWHL A	16	4	9	13	37	5	2	1	3	0
2022-23	Ladies Team Lugano	National Cup	2	2	5	7	6	-	-	-	-	-
2023-24	HC Ambrì-Piotta Girls	SWHL A	27	19	16	35	34	5	2	1	3	2
2023-24	HC Ambrì-Piotta Girls	National Cup	2	2	2	4	0	-	-	-	-	-
SWHL A totals			293	191	175	366	279	99	43	38	81	62

=== International ===
Year	Team	Event	GP	G	A	Pts	PIM
2011	Switzerland U18	WJC18	6	0	0	0	2
2012	Switzerland U18	WJC-18	6	2	2	4	2
2013	Switzerland	WC	5	0	0	0	2
2013	Switzerland U18	WJC-18 D1	5	2	5	7	2
2014	Switzerland	OG	6	1	0	1	0
2015	Switzerland	WC	4	0	0	0	0
2016	Switzerland	WC	5	0	0	0	0
Junior totals			17	4	7	11	6
WC totals			14	0	0	0	2
OG totals			6	1	0	1	0

== Honours and achievements ==
=== SWHL-A ===
- 2013-2014 : Champion with Ladies Team Lugano
- 2014-2015 : Champion with Ladies Team Lugano
- 2020-2021 : Champion with Ladies Team Lugano

=== Swiss Women Cup ===
- 2016-2017 : Cup Winner with Ladies Team Lugano

=== WJC-18 ===
2013 : Silver Medal in D1 Division
