= Stefanie Marty =

Swiss ice hockey player and coach

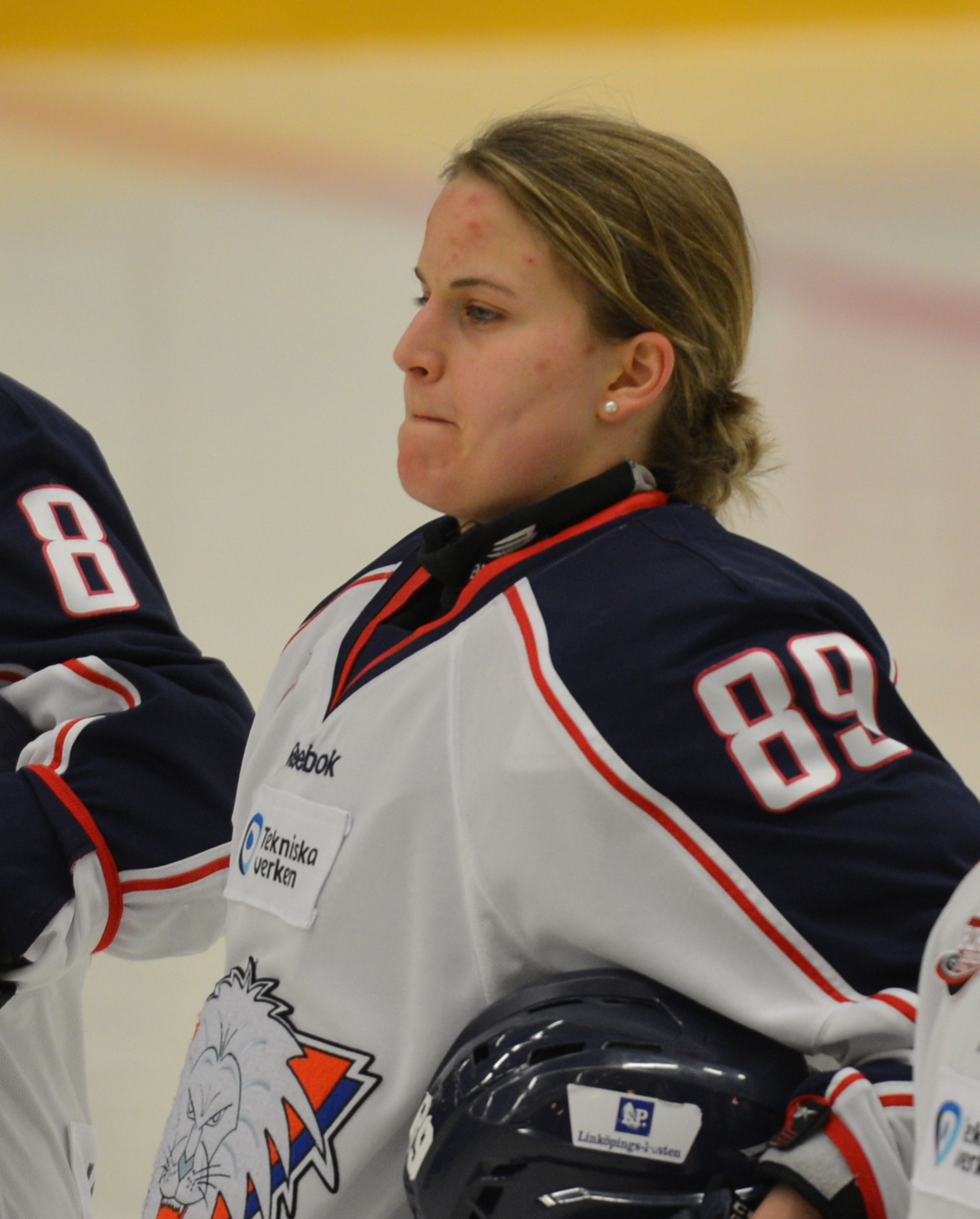
- Born: 16 April 1988 (age 38) Nussbaumen, Switzerland
- Height: 167 cm (5 ft 6 in)
- Weight: 70 kg (154 lb; 11 st 0 lb)
- Position: Forward
- Shot: Left
- Played for: EV Zug; New Hampshire Wildcats; Syracuse Orange; SC Reinach; Linköping HC; Neuchâtel Hockey Academy
- National team: Switzerland
- Playing career: 2003–2017
Medal record
Women's ice hockey
Representing Switzerland
Olympic Games
Bronze medal – third place	2014 Sochi	Team
World Championships
Bronze medal – third place	2012 United States

Stefanie Andrea Marty (born 16 April 1988) is a Swiss retired ice hockey player who currently serves as assistant coach to SC Reinach of the SWHL A. She was a member of the Swiss national team from 2003 until her retirement in 2017. With the Swiss national team, she won bronze medals at the 2014 Olympic Games and the 2012 IIHF Women's World Championship. At the 2010 Olympic Games, Marty scored 9 goals and tied with Meghan Agosta of Team Canada as top goal scorer of the tournament.

== Playing career ==
Marty played youth ice hockey with the local club, EHC Wettingen-Baden. She made her debut in the SWHL A with SC Zug in the 2003–04 season, at age 15, and played the following two seasons with the team.

She began her collegiate career in the 2007–08 season with the New Hampshire Wildcats of Hockey East of the NCAA Division I. As a freshman with the Wildcats, Marty scored 10 points (3 goals + 7 assists) in 32 games and played in the 2008 NCAA Championship quarterfinals. She transferred to Syracuse University for the 2008–09 season and remained with the Syracuse Orange until her graduation in 2011.

Marty's twin sister, Julia Marty, in an ice hockey defenceman who currently plays with SC Reinach of the SWHL A. With the exception of their sophomore through senior years in college, Stefanie and Julia played together on the same teams for the entirety of Stefanie’s career.

=== Swiss national team ===
Prior to the NCAA, she was nominated to be Swiss Hockey Woman of the Year in 2005. Her Swiss team placed eighth in the 2004 World Championship at Halifax. Marty appeared in the 2006 Olympic games in Torino where her team earned seventh place. From 2003–2007, she played for the EV Zug in the Swiss league. The team earned two Swiss Championships in 2004 and 2005 and two Swiss Vice-Championships in 2006 and 2007. At the Vancouver Winter Games, she tied the Olympic record for most goals scored in a single tournament with nine and helped her homeland to a fifth-place finish. In a game against Russia at the 2012 IIHF Women's World Championship, Stefanie Marty scored two goals in a 5–2 victory, as Switzerland advanced to the semifinals.

=== Syracuse ===
During the week of 2 October 2009, Marty accumulated three points in Syracuse's 3–3 tie at Boston College. In addition, she scored a goal in a game against the New Hampshire Wildcats, her former team.

Marty was part of all four Syracuse goals in a 4–3 win against Princeton. This occurred during the week of 8 December 2009. She assisted on the game-winning goal.

On 1 October 2010, Marty had two goals in a 4–4 tie vs. Northeastern. The Northeastern team featured her twin sister Julia Marty. It was the first time the sisters had played against each other in their NCAA careers.

== Career statistics ==
=== Club ===
			Regular season					Playoffs
Season	Team	League	GP	G	A	Pts	PIM	GP	G	A	Pts	PIM
2003-04	EV Zug Damen	SWHL A	20	19	11	30	-	-	-	-	-	-
2004-05	EV Zug Damen	SWHL A	-	-	-	-	-	-	-	-	-	-
2006-07	EV Zug Damen	SWHL A	-	-	-	-	-	-	-	-	-	-
2007-08	New Hampshire Wildcats	NCAA	32	3	7	10	6	-	-	-	-	-
2008-09	Syracuse Orange	NCAA	27	9	12	21	30	-	-	-	-	-
2009-10	Syracuse Orange	NCAA	30	16	15	31	30	-	-	-	-	-
2010-11	Syracuse Orange	NCAA	31	7	8	15	16	-	-	-	-	-
2011-12	SC Reinach Damen	SWHL A	10	12	9	21	12	-	-	-	-	-
2012-13	SC Reinach Damen	SWHL A	16	23	22	45	14	5	2	6	8	4
2013-14	Linköping HC	Riksserien	26	22	17	39	14	3	4	3	7	0
2014-15	Neuchâtel Hockey Academy	SWHL A	9	8	9	17	2	-	-	-	-	-
2014-15	Linköping HC	Riksserien	9	7	13	20	2	5	3	2	5	0
2015-16	Neuchâtel Hockey Academy	SWHL A	18	22	20	42	6	4	5	5	10	4
2015-16	Neuchâtel Hockey Academy	Swiss Women Cup	4	4	8	12	2	-	-	-	-	-
2016-17	Neuchâtel Hockey Academy	SWHL A	18	22	17	39	12	5	6	3	9	4
2016-17	Neuchâtel Hockey Academy	Swiss Women Cup	3	0	5	5	2	-	-	-	-	-
2020-21	SC Reinach Damen	SWHL A	17	4	8	12	16	-	-	-	-	-
2021-22	EV Bomo Thun	SWHL A	22	15	11	26	12	3	0	2	2	0
2021-22	EV Bomo Thun	National Cup	2	3	3	6	0	-	-	-	-	-
2022-23	EV Bomo Thun	SWHL A	18	8	17	25	8	9	1	2	3	10
2022-23	EV Bomo Thun	National Cup	4	3	2	5	0	-	-	-	-	-
2023-24	SC Bern Frauen	SWHL A	24	4	23	27	6	8	0	1	1	2
2023-24	SC Bern Frauen	National Cup	4	2	3	5	2	-	-	-	-	-
SWHL A totals			172	137	147	284	88	34	14	19	33	24
NCAA totals			120	35	42	77	82	-	-	-	-	-
Riksserien A totals			35	29	30	59	16	8	7	5	12	0

=== International ===
Year	Team	Event	GP	G	A	Pts	PIM
2004	Switzerland	WC	4	1	0	1	0
2005	Switzerland	WC D1	5	4	3	7	0
2006	Switzerland	OG	5	2	1	3	2
2007	Switzerland	WC	4	1	0	1	6
2008	Switzerland	WC	5	4	2	6	10
2009	Switzerland	WC	4	0	0	0	0
2010	Switzerland	OG	5	9	2	11	6
2011	Switzerland	WC	5	2	1	3	4
2012	Switzerland	WC	6	2	4	6	10
2013	Switzerland	WC	5	0	2	2	4
2014	Switzerland	OG	6	2	0	2	2
2015	Switzerland	WC	4	2	2	4	2
WC totals			42	16	14	30	36
OG totals			14	13	5	18	10

== Honours and achievements ==
=== NCAA ===
- CHA Offensive Player of the Week, (Week of 12 October 2009)
- CHA Offensive Player of the Week, (Week of 13 December 2009)
- 2010 Second Team All-CHA

=== Riksserien ===
- 2013-2014 : Champion with Linköping HC
- 2013-2014 : Most Goals in playoffs (4)
- 2014-2015 : Champion with Linköping HC

=== Swiss Women Cup ===
- 2023-2024 : Cup Winner with SC Bern Frauen

=== WC ===
- 2004 : Gold Medal in D1 Division
- 2012 : Bronze Medal

=== OG ===
- 2014 : Bronze Medal

=== Other ===
- 2015 : Swiss Hockey Hall of Fame

== See also ==
- List of Olympic medalist families
