= Michielin =

Michielin is a surname. Notable people with the surname include:

- Francesca Michielin (born 1995), Italian singer-songwriter
- Rahel Michielin (born 1990), Swiss ice hockey player
