= Christine Meier =

Swiss ice hockey player

- Born: 24 May 1986 (age 39) Bülach, Switzerland
- Height: 5 ft 7 in (170 cm)
- Weight: 154 lb (70 kg; 11 st 0 lb)
- Position: Defence
- Shoots: Left
- LNA team Former teams: ZSC Lions; EHC Illnau; SC Reinach; AIK IF
- National team: Switzerland
- Playing career: 2000–present

Christine Meier (born 24 May 1986) is a Swiss ice hockey player.

== International career ==
Meier was selected for the Switzerland women's national ice hockey team in the 2006 and 2010 Winter Olympics. In 2010, she scored three assists in five games. In 2006, she scored one goal.

Meier has also appeared for Switzerland at seven IIHF Women's World Championships at two levels. Her first appearance came in 2001.

== Career statistics ==
=== Club ===
			Regular season					Playoffs
Season	Team	League	GP	G	A	Pts	PIM	GP	G	A	Pts	PIM
2000-01	EHC Illnau-Effretikon Damen	SWHL A	10	3	2	5	0	-	-	-	-	-
2003-04	EHC Illnau-Effretikon Damen	SWHL A		11	3	14		-	-	-	-	-
2004-05	EHC Illnau-Effretikon Damen	SWHL A						-	-	-	-	-
2005-06	EHC Illnau-Effretikon Damen	SWHL A						-	-	-	-	-
2006-07	SC Reinach Damen	SWHL A						-	-	-	-	-
2007-08	ZSC Lions Frauen	SWHL A	19	17	21	38	12	3	2	1	3	4
2008-09	AIK	Riksserien	20	4	13	17	12	2	1	2	3	0
2009-10	ZSC Lions Frauen	SWHL A	16	17	21	38	8	4	7	4	11	2
2010-11	ZSC Lions Frauen	SWHL A	20	35	42	77	8	6	5	9	14	6
2011-12	ZSC Lions Frauen	SWHL A	20	20	21	41	10	6	5	8	13	2
2012-13	ZSC Lions Frauen	SWHL A	19	19	28	47	6	8	12	6	18	2
2013-14	ZSC Lions Frauen	SWHL A	20	51	28	79	14	6	6	5	11	4
2014-15	ZSC Lions Frauen	SWHL A	18	21	12	33	10	6	2	2	4	8
2015-16	ZSC Lions Frauen	SWHL A	14	24	21	45	2	7	8	8	16	4
2015-16	ZSC Lions Frauen	Swiss Women Cup	3	5	14	19	2	-	-	-	-	-
2016-17	ZSC Lions Frauen	SWHL A	17	29	24	53	6	6	7	5	12	4
2016-17	ZSC Lions Frauen	Swiss Women Cup	2	2	1	3	2	-	-	-	-	-
2017-18	ZSC Lions Frauen	SWHL A	19	13	34	47	4	6	3	4	7	0
2017-18	ZSC Lions Frauen	Swiss Women Cup	4	9	8	17	2	-	-	-	-	-
2022-23	EHC Wallisellen Lions Frauen	SWHL C	13	32	25	57	0	-	-	-	-	-
2023-24	EHC Wallisellen Lions Frauen	SWHL C	13	36	28	64	0	1	1	0	1	0
SWHL A totals			218	328	310	638	80	59	58	52	110	36
SDHL totals			20	4	13	17	12	2	1	2	3	0

=== International ===
Year	Team	Event	GP	G	A	Pts	PIM
2001	Switzerland	WC D1	4	0	1	1	0
2004	Switzerland	WC	4	0	0	0	0
2005	Switzerland	WC D1	5	4	3	7	4
2006	Switzerland	OG	5	1	0	1	2
2007	Switzerland	WC	4	1	2	3	4
2008	Switzerland	WC	5	0	2	2	2
2009	Switzerland	WC	4	2	3	5	4
2010	Switzerland	OG	5	0	3	3	6
2011	Switzerland	WC	5	1	1	2	2
2016	Switzerland	WC	5	4	5	9	0
2017	Switzerland	WC	6	2	3	5	2
2018	Switzerland	OG	6	0	8	8	0
WC totals			42	14	20	34	18
OG totals			16	1	11	12	8

== Honours and achievements ==
=== Riksserien ===
- 2008-2009 : Champion with AIK

=== SWHL-A ===
- 2009-2010 : Most Goals in Playoffs (11)
- 2010-2011 : Champion with ZSC Lions Frauen
- 2011-2012 : Champion with ZSC Lions Frauen
- 2012-2013 : Champion with ZSC Lions Frauen
- 2012-2013 : Most Goals in Playoffs (12)
- 2012-2013 : Most Points in Playoffs (18)
- 2013-2014 : Best PPG (3,95)
- 2013-2014 : Most Goals (51)
- 2013-2014 : Most Points (79)
- 2015-2016 : Champion with ZSC Lions Frauen
- 2015-2016 : Best PPG (3,21)
- 2015-2016 : Most Assists (21)
- 2015-2016 : Most Goals (24)
- 2015-2016 : Most Points (45)
- 2015-2016 : Most Assists in Playoffs (8)
- 2015-2016 : Most Goals in Playoffs (8)
- 2015-2016 : Most Points in Playoffs (16)
- 2016-2017 : Champion with ZSC Lions Frauen
- 2016-2017 : Best PPG (3,12)
- 2016-2017 : Most Goals in Playoffs (7)
- 2016-2017 : Most Points in Playoffs (12)
- 2017-2018 : Champion with ZSC Lions Frauen
- 2017-2018 : Most Assists (34)

=== Swiss Women Cup ===
- 2014-2015 : Cup Winner with ZSC Lions Frauen
- 2014-2015 : Most Point (19)
- 2017-2018 : Cup Winner with ZSC Lions Frauen

=== WC ===
- 2001 : Gold Medal in D1 Division
- 2005 : Gold Medal in D1 Division
- 2007 : Top 3 Player on Team
- 2009 : Top 3 Player on Team
- 2016 : Top 3 Player on Team
- 2016 : Most Assists (5)
- 2016 : All-Star Team
- 2017 : Top 3 Player on Team

=== OG ===
- 2018 : Most Assists (8)
- 2018 : Most Points by Defenseman (8)

=== Other ===
- 2008 : Swiss Ice Hockey Woman of the Year
- 2009 : Swiss Ice Hockey Woman of the Year
- 2016 : Swiss Ice Hockey Woman of the Year
- 2018 : Swiss Hockey Hall of Fame
