= Katrin Nabholz =

Swiss ice hockey player

- Born: 3 April 1986 (age 39); Basel, Switzerland
- Height: 5 ft 6 in (168 cm)
- Weight: 123 lb (56 kg; 8 st 11 lb)
- Position: Forward
- Shoots: Left
- National team: Switzerland
- Playing career: 2005–present

Katrin Nabholz
Medal record

Women's ice hockey

Representing Switzerland

Olympic Games
Bronze medal – third place	2014 Sochi	Team

IIHF World Women's Championships
Bronze medal – third place	2012 United States	Tournament

Katrin Elisabeth Nabholz (born 3 April 1986 in Basel, Switzerland) is a Swiss ice hockey forward.

== International career ==
Nabholz was selected for the Switzerland national women's ice hockey team in the 2010 Winter Olympics. She played in all five games, though she did not score a point.

Nabholz has also appeared for Switzerland at seven IIHF Women's World Championships at two levels. Her first appearance came in 2005. She was a member of the bronze medal-winning team at the 2012 championships.

== Career statistics ==
=== Club ===
			Regular season					Playoffs
Season	Team	League	GP	G	A	Pts	PIM	GP	G	A	Pts	PIM
2003-04	DHC Lyss	SWHL A	-	7	2	9	-	-	-	-	-	-
2004-05	DHC Lyss	SWHL A	-	-	-	-	-	-	-	-	-	-
2005-06	EHC Illnau-Effretikon Damen	SWHL A	-	-	-	-	-	-	-	-	-	-
2006-07	SC Reinach Damen	SWHL A	-	-	-	-	-	-	-	-	-	-
2007-08	ZSC Lions Frauen	SWHL A	20	16	12	28	10	3	1	1	2	0
2008-09	ZSC Lions Frauen	SWHL A	21	13	27	40	8	3	3	3	6	2
2009-10	ZSC Lions Frauen	SWHL A	17	20	20	40	2	4	1	5	6	2
2010-11	ZSC Lions Frauen	SWHL A	15	17	25	42	4	6	1	7	8	6
2011-12	ZSC Lions Frauen	SWHL A	16	8	8	16	4	4	2	3	5	0
2012-13	ZSC Lions Frauen	SWHL A	14	7	10	17	6	8	3	5	8	0
2013-14	ZSC Lions Frauen	SWHL A	16	12	18	30	8	5	0	4	4	2
2014-15	ZSC Lions Frauen	SWHL A	13	4	3	7	2	8	2	4	6	0
2015-16	ZSC Lions Frauen	SWHL A	11	9	9	18	4	6	1	1	2	2
2015-16	ZSC Lions Frauen	Swiss Women Cup	2	0	0	0	0	-	-	-	-	-
2016-17	ZSC Lions Frauen	SWHL A	3	1	0	1	0	1	0	0	0	0
SWHL A totals			146	114	134	248	48	48	14	33	47	14

=== International ===
Year	Team	Event	GP	G	A	Pts	PIM
2005	Switzerland	WC D1	5	0	0	0	0
2007	Switzerland	WC	4	0	1	1	0
2008	Switzerland	WC	5	0	0	0	2
2009	Switzerland	WC	4	0	1	1	2
2010	Switzerland	OG	5	0	0	0	0
2011	Switzerland	WC	5	0	0	0	2
2012	Switzerland	WC	6	1	1	2	0
2013	Switzerland	WC	5	1	1	2	0
2014	Switzerland	OG	6	0	0	0	0
WC totals			34	2	4	6	6
OG totals			11	0	0	0	0

== Honours and achievements ==
=== SWHL-A ===
- 2008-2009 : Most Assists (27)
- 2010-2011 : Champion with ZSC Lions Frauen
- 2011-2012 : Champion with ZSC Lions Frauen
- 2012-2013 : Champion with ZSC Lions Frauen
- 2015-2016 : Champion with ZSC Lions Frauen
- 2016-2017 : Champion with ZSC Lions Frauen

=== Swiss Women Cup ===
- 2015-2016 : Cup Winner with ZSC Lions Frauen

=== WC ===
- 2005 : Gold Medal in Division D1
- 2012 : Bronze Medal

=== WC ===
- 2014 : Bronze Medal
