= Anthamatten =

Anthamatten is a surname. Notable people with the surname include:

- Martin Anthamatten (born 1984), Swiss ski mountaineer and mountain runner
- Simon Anthamatten (born 1983), Swiss mountain climber and mountain guide
- Sophie Anthamatten (born 1991), Swiss ice hockey player
