= Sara Benz =

Swiss ice hockey player (born 1992)

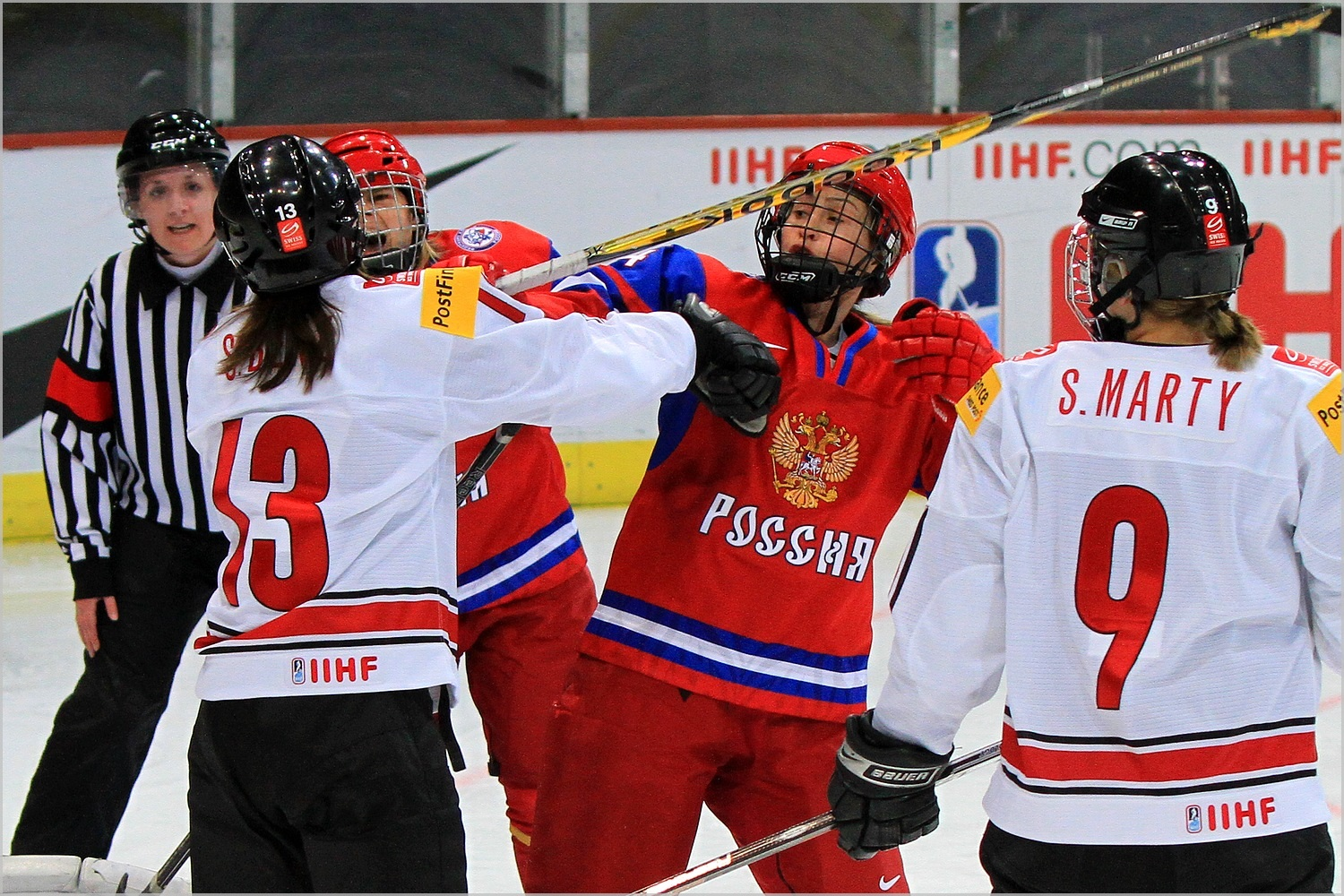
- Sara Benz vs. Russian Player, Stefanie Marty looking
- Born: 25 August 1992 (age 32); Zürich, Switzerland
- Height: 5 ft 4 in (163 cm)
- Weight: 121 lb (55 kg; 8 st 9 lb)
- Position: Forward
- Shoots: Left
- National team: Switzerland
- Playing career: 2008–present

Sara Benz
Medal record

Women's ice hockey

Representing Switzerland

Olympic Games
Bronze medal – third place	2014 Sochi	Team

IIHF World Women's Championships
Bronze medal – third place	2012 United States	Tournament

Sara Benz (born 25 August 1992 in Zürich, Switzerland) is a Swiss ice hockey forward, who shoots left.

== International career ==
Benz was selected for the Switzerland national women's ice hockey team in the 2010 Winter Olympics. She played in all five games, scoring a goal.

Benz has also appeared for Switzerland at four IIHF Women's World Championships, with her first appearance in 2009. She was also a member of the bronze medal-winning team at the 2012 championships.

Benz made three appearances for the Switzerland women's national under-18 ice hockey team, at two levels of the IIHF World Women's U18 Championships. Her first came in 2008.

== Personal life ==
Her twin sister Laura Benz is also a hockey player.

== Career statistics ==
=== Club ===
			Regular season					Playoffs
Season	Team	League	GP	G	A	Pts	PIM	GP	G	A	Pts	PIM
2008-09	ZSC Lions Frauen	SWHL A	0	0	0	0	0	2	0	0	0	2
2010-11	ZSC Lions Frauen	SWHL A	5	11	7	18	2	5	9	8	17	6
2011-12	ZSC Lions Frauen	SWHL A	19	23	14	37	18	5	5	2	7	2
2012-13	ZSC Lions Frauen	SWHL A	17	30	20	50	8	2	2	2	4	2
2013-14	ZSC Lions Frauen	SWHL A	5	6	6	12	4	6	3	5	8	4
2014-15	ZSC Lions Frauen	SWHL A	9	18	6	24	12	3	2	4	6	0
2017-18	ZSC Lions Frauen	SWHL A	14	12	8	20	12	-	-	-	-	-
2017-18	ZSC Lions Frauen	Swiss Women Cup	3	8	11	19	0	-	-	-	-	-
SWHL A totals			69	100	61	161	56	23	21	21	42	16

=== International ===
Year	Team	Event	GP	G	A	Pts	PIM
2008	Switzerland U18	WJC18	5	4	2	6	2
2009	Switzerland	WC	4	0	2	2	0
2009	Switzerland U18	WJC-18	2	0	2	2	2
2010	Switzerland	OG	5	1	0	1	2
2010	Switzerland U18	WJC-18 D1	5	9	9	18	8
2011	Switzerland	WC	5	3	2	5	2
2012	Switzerland	WC	5	2	2	4	2
2013	Switzerland	WC	5	1	0	1	2
2014	Switzerland	OG	6	1	1	2	2
2018	Switzerland	OG	6	2	3	5	2
Junior totals			12	13	13	26	12
WC totals			19	6	6	12	6
OG totals			17	4	4	8	6

== Honours and achievements ==
=== SWHL-A ===
- 2010-2011 : Champion with ZSC Lions Frauen
- 2011-2012 : Champion with ZSC Lions Frauen
- 2012-2013 : Champion with ZSC Lions Frauen
- 2012-2013 : Best PPG (2,94)
- 2012-2013 : Most Goals (30)
- 2014-2015 : Best PPG (2,67)

=== Swiss Women Cup ===
- 2017-2018 : Cup Winner with ZSC Lions Frauen
- 2017-2018 : Most Point (19)

=== WJC-18 ===
2008 : Top 3 Player on Team 2010 : Best Forward in D1 Division 2010 : Gold Medal in D1 Division 2010 : Most Goals (9) in D1 Division 2010 : Most Assists (9) in D1 Division 2010 : Most Points (18) in D1 Division

=== WC ===
- 2011 : Top 3 Player on Team
- 2012 : Bronze Medal
- 2013 : Top 3 Player on Team

=== OG ===
- 2014 : Bronze Medal

=== Other ===
- 2018 : Swiss Hockey Hall of Fame

== See also ==
- List of Olympic medalist families
