= Alyssa Wohlfeiler =

American ice hockey forward

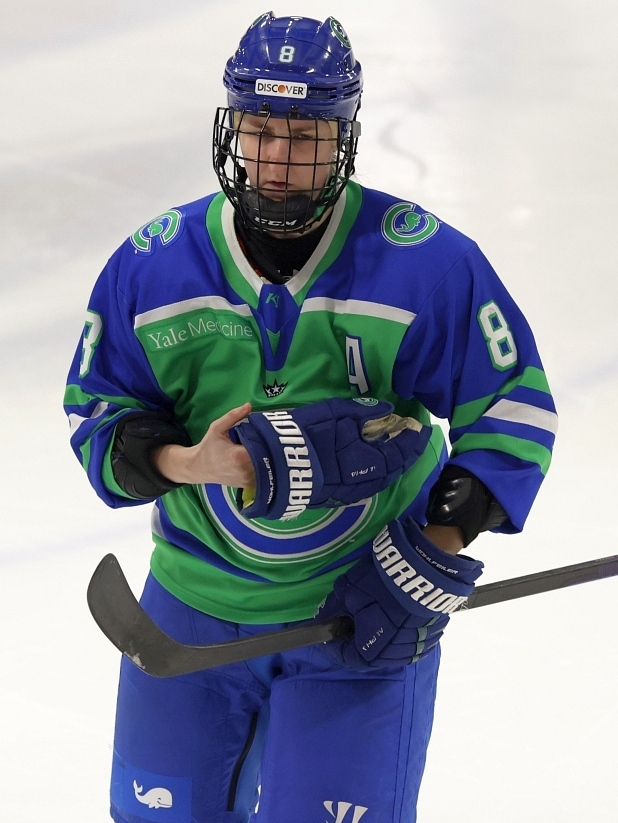
- Wohlfeiler with the Connecticut Whale in 2023
- Born: May 6, 1989 (age 36) Santa Clarita, California, U.S.
- Height: 173 cm (5 ft 8 in)
- Position: Forward
- Shoots: Right
- PHF team Former teams: Connecticut Whale; Boston Pride; EC Bergkamener Bären; HV71; Connecticut Whale; HC Lugano; Boston Blades; Northeastern University
- Playing career: 2011–present

Alyssa Wohlfeiler is an American ice hockey forward who played with the Connecticut Whale in the now defunct Premier Hockey Federation (PHF).

== Career ==
Across 133 games with Northeastern, Wohlfeiler scored 71 points. She would serve as the team's captain in her final year.

After graduating, she signed with the Boston Blades in the CWHL. She would play three seasons with the team, putting up 23 points in 52 games.

In 2014, she left North America to sign with HC Lugano, with who she would score 29 points in 18 games as the team won the national championship. After one season in Switzerland, she signed with the Connecticut Whale in the newly formed Premier Hockey Federation, scoring 7 points in 17 games. She would only spend one season with the team, before returning to Europe to play for HV71 in Sweden and then EC Bergkamener Bären in Germany.

In August 2019, she returned to the NWHL to sign with the Boston Pride. In her first season with the Pride, she would score 16 points in 14 games, as the team finished first in league standings.

It was announced in June 2020 that she would be returning to her prior PHF team Connecticut Whale.

Wohlfeiler scored the first goal under the PHF name, after they had rebranded from NWHL.

== Career statistics ==
			Regular season					Playoffs
Season	Team	League	GP	G	A	Pts	PIM	GP	G	A	Pts	PIM
2007-08	Northeastern Huskies	NCAA	33	6	7	13	24	-	-	-	-	-
2008-09	Northeastern Huskies	NCAA	35	8	13	21	42	-	-	-	-	-
2009-10	Northeastern Huskies	NCAA	32	10	10	20	20	-	-	-	-	-
2010-11	Northeastern Huskies	NCAA	33	8	9	17	38	-	-	-	-	-
2011-12	Boston Blades	CWHL	26	5	11	16	24	3	1	0	1	0
2012-13	Boston Blades	CWHL	2	0	0	0	0	-	-	-	-	-
2013-14	Boston Blades	CWHL	24	4	3	7	22	4	0	0	0	6
2014-15	Ladies Team Lugano	SWHL A	18	13	16	29	32	8	7	3	10	12
2015-16	Connecticut Whale	NWHL	17	3	4	7	20	1	0	0	0	2
2017-18	HV71	SDHL	12	3	2	5	10	2	0	0	0	4
2018-19	EC Bergkamener Bären	DFEL	27	29	26	55	24	2	1	1	2	2
2019-20	Boston Pride	NWHL	14	5	11	16	22	1	0	1	1	0
2020-21	Connecticut Whale	NWHL	4	1	4	5	4	1	0	0	0	0
2021-22	Connecticut Whale	PHF	18	8	8	16	8	2	1	1	2	2
2022-23	Connecticut Whale	PHF	24	7	8	15	16	3	0	0	0	4
NCAA totals			133	32	39	71	124	-	-	-	-	-
CWHL totals			52	9	14	23	46	7	1	0	1	6
SWHL A totals			18	13	16	29	32	8	7	3	10	12
PHF totals			77	24	35	59	70	8	1	2	3	8
SDHL totals			12	3	2	5	10	2	0	0	0	4
DFEL totals			27	29	26	55	24	2	1	1	2	2

== Honours and achievements ==
=== SWHL-A ===
- 2014-2015 : Champion with Ladies Team Lugano

=== NWHL ===
- 2019-2020 : Regular Season Champion with Boston Pride

== Personal life ==
Wohlfeiler has a degree in criminal justice.
