= Anja Stiefel =

Swiss ice hockey player (born 1990)

- Born: 9 August 1990 (age 36) Frauenfeld, Switzerland
- Height: 160 cm (5 ft 3 in)
- Weight: 62 kg (137 lb; 9 st 11 lb)
- Position: Forward
- Shot: Right
- Played for: HT Thurgau Ladies; Luleå HF/MSSK; Ladies Team Lugano; SC Reinach; Calgary Oval X-Treme; KSC Küssnacht am Rigi Damen
- National team: Switzerland
- Playing career: 2004–2021
Medal record
Olympic Games
Bronze medal – third place	2014 Sochi	Team
World Championship
Bronze medal – third place	2012 United States

Anja Michaela Stiefel (born 9 August 1990) is a Swiss retired ice hockey forward and two time Olympian with the Swiss national ice hockey team.

== International career ==
Stiefel was selected to represent Switzerland in the 2010 Winter Olympics. She played in all five games, but did not record a point.

Stiefel has also appeared for Switzerland at five IIHF Women's World Championships. Her first appearance came in 2008. She was a member of the bronze medal winning team at the 2012 championships.

Stiefel made one appearance for the Switzerland women's national under-18 ice hockey team, at the 2008 IIHF World Women's U18 Championship.

== Career statistics ==
=== Club ===
			Regular season					Playoffs
Season	Team	League	GP	G	A	Pts	PIM	GP	G	A	Pts	PIM
2007-08	KSC Küssnacht am Rigi Damen	SWHL A	14	8	5	13	4	4	4	0	4	0
2008-09	Calgary Oval X-Treme	WWHL	21	2	3	5	0	-	-	-	-	-
2009-10	SC Reinach Damen	SWHL A	18	14	10	24	8	3	5	2	7	0
2010-11	SC Reinach Damen	SWHL A	19	33	12	45	6	4	3	6	9	0
2011-12	SC Reinach Damen	SWHL A	15	16	6	22	0	5	6	3	9	2
2012-13	SC Reinach Damen	SWHL A	19	17	12	29	12	4	4	0	4	0
2013-14	Ladies Team Lugano	SWHL A	19	26	15	41	4	6	7	5	12	0
2014-15	Ladies Team Lugano	SWHL A	18	21	15	36	0	8	3	4	7	2
2015-16	Ladies Team Lugano	SWHL A	19	12	12	24	2	7	8	3	11	4
2016-17	Luleå HF/MSSK	SDHL	34	8	11	19	2	4	0	1	1	0
2017-18	Luleå HF/MSSK	SDHL	36	12	5	17	14	7	2	0	2	0
2017-18	Luleå HF 2	Hockeyettan	2	2	2	4	0	-	-	-	-	-
2020-21	Hockey Team Thurgau Indien Ladies	SWHL A	0	0	0	0	0	5	1	1	2	0
2021-22	Hockey Team Thurgau Indien Ladies	SWHL A	2	1	0	1	0	1	0	0	0	0
SWHL A totals			143	148	87	235	36	47	41	24	65	8
WWHL totals			21	2	3	5	0	-	-	-	-	-
SDHL totals			70	20	16	36	16	11	2	1	3	0

=== International ===
Year	Team	Event	GP	G	A	Pts	PIM
2008	Switzerland	WJC18	5	1	3	4	8
2007-08	Switzerland	WC	5	0	0	0	0
2009	Switzerland	WC	4	0	1	1	2
2010	Switzerland	OG	5	0	0	0	0
2011	Switzerland	WC	5	1	2	3	0
2012	Switzerland	WC	6	1	2	3	2
2013	Switzerland	WC	5	0	0	0	0
2014	Switzerland	OG	6	0	0	0	0
2015	Switzerland	WC	4	1	1	2	2
2016	Switzerland	WC	5	2	0	2	4
2017	Switzerland	WC	6	0	1	1	0
Junior totals			5	1	3	4	8
WC totals			40	5	7	12	10
OG totals			11	0	0	0	0

== Honours and achievements ==
=== SWHL-A ===
- 2013-2014 : Champion with Ladies Team Lugano
- 2014-2015 : Champion with Ladies Team Lugano
- 2015-2016 : Most Goals in Playoffs (8)

=== SDHL ===
- 2017-2018 : Champion with Luleå HF/MSSK

=== WC ===
- 2012 : Bronze Medal
- 2015 : Top 3 Player on Team

=== OG ===
- 2014 : Bronze Medal

=== Other ===
- 2018 : Swiss Hockey Hall of Fame
