= Evelina Raselli =

Swiss ice hockey player

- Born: 3 May 1992 (age 34) Poschiavo, Switzerland
- Height: 1.70 m (5 ft 7 in)
- Weight: 61 kg (134 lb; 9 st 8 lb)
- Position: Forward
- Shot: Left
- Played for: SC Reinach; SC Celerina; HC Lugano; Boston Pride
- National team: Switzerland
- Playing career: 2007–2022
Medal record
Women's ice hockey
Representing Switzerland
Olympic Games
Bronze medal – third place	2014 Sochi	Team
World Championships
Bronze medal – third place	2012 United States

Evelina Raselli (born 3 May 1992) is a Swiss retired ice hockey forward.

She has represented Switzerland at the Winter Olympics in 2014, 2018, and 2022. She won the bronze medal after defeating Sweden in the bronze medal playoff in 2014. The team also finished fifth in 2018, and fourth in 2022.

She was selected by the Boston Pride in the 2021 NWHL International Draft on 25 July 2021.

In November 2022, she announced her retirement.

== Career statistics ==
=== Club ===
			Regular season					Playoffs
Season	Team	League	GP	G	A	Pts	PIM	GP	G	A	Pts	PIM
2007-08	SC Celerina Damen	SWHL B	16	12	5	17	64	-	-	-	-	-
2008-09	Ladies Team Lugano	SWHL A	17	4	6	10	14	5	0	2	2	2
2009-10	Ladies Team Lugano	SWHL A	14	3	8	11	20	5	0	0	0	6
2010-11	Ladies Team Lugano	SWHL A	16	7	12	19	24	6	2	1	3	18
2011-12	Ladies Team Lugano	SWHL A	20	11	6	17	58	3	0	0	0	0
2012-13	Ladies Team Lugano	SWHL A	20	19	22	41	20	9	2	5	7	40
2013-14	Ladies Team Lugano	SWHL A	17	7	4	11	60	6	4	5	9	6
2014-15	Ladies Team Lugano	SWHL A	20	27	19	46	28	7	5	3	8	4
2015-16	Ladies Team Lugano	SWHL A	20	10	18	28	10	7	4	3	7	22
2016-17	Ladies Team Lugano	SWHL A	16	17	17	34	8	7	5	7	12	2
2016-17	Ladies Team Lugano	Swiss Women's Cup	4	7	11	18	0	-	-	-	-	-
2017-18	Ladies Team Lugano	SWHL A	20	20	25	45	22	6	3	3	6	8
2017-18	Ladies Team Lugano	Swiss Women's Cup	1	0	0	0	2	-	-	-	-	-
2018-19	SC Reinach Damen	SWHL A	19	18	16	34	30	5	2	1	3	12
2018-19	SC Reinach Damen	Swiss Women's Cup	2	1	2	3	0	-	-	-	-	-
2019-20	SC Reinach Damen	SWHL A	10	10	5	15	20	-	-	-	-	-
2019-20	Brynäs IF	SDHL	16	1	6	7	12	5	0	0	0	0
2020-21	Ladies Team Lugano	SWHL A	20	14	19	33	32	8	3	7	10	6
2021-22	Boston Pride	PHF	16	1	2	3	6	3	2	1	3	2
SWHL A totals			229	167	177	344	346	74	30	37	67	126
SDHL totals			16	1	6	7	12	5	0	0	0	0
PHF totals			16	1	2	3	6	3	2	1	3	2

=== International ===
Year	Team	Event	GP	G	A	Pts	PIM
2008	Switzerland	WJC18	5	0	0	0	2
2009	Switzerland	WJC18	5	3	3	6	6
2010	Switzerland	WJC18 D1	5	4	7	11	20
2011	Switzerland	WC	5	0	1	1	0
2012	Switzerland	WC	6	2	0	2	6
2013	Switzerland	WC	5	0	1	1	0
2014	Switzerland	OG	5	0	0	0	25
2015	Switzerland	WC	4	0	0	0	0
2016	Switzerland	WC	5	2	0	2	2
2017	Switzerland	WC	6	1	2	3	6
2018	Switzerland	OG	6	2	2	4	2
2019	Switzerland	WC	4	2	0	2	2
2021	Switzerland	WC	7	1	0	1	2
2022	Switzerland	OG	7	0	0	0	2
2022	Switzerland	WC	7	0	1	1	0
Junior totals			15	7	10	17	28
WC totals			51	8	5	13	18
OG totals			16	2	2	4	29

== Honours and achievements ==
=== SWHL-A ===
- 2008-2009 : Champion with Ladies Team Lugano
- 2009-2010 : Champion with Ladies Team Lugano
- 2013-2014 : Champion with Ladies Team Lugano
- 2013-2014 : Most Penalized Player (60)
- 2014-2015 : Champion with Ladies Team Lugano
- 2014-2015 : Most Goals (27)
- 2016-2017 : Most Assists Playoffs (7)
- 2016-2017 : Most Points Playoffs (12)
- 2020-2021 : Champion with Ladies Team Lugano

=== Swiss Women's Cup ===
- 2016-2017 : Most Points (18)
- 2016-2017 : Cup Winner with Ladies Team Lugano

=== PHF ===
- 2021-2022 : Isobel Cup Champion with Boston Pride

=== WJC18 ===
- 22009 : Top 3 Player on Team
- 2010 : Gold Medal of D1 Division

=== WC ===
- 2012 : Bronze Medal
- 2019 : Top 3 Player on Team
- 2021 : Top 3 Player on Team

=== OG ===
- 2014 : Bronze Medal
- 2014 : Most Penalized Player (25)

=== Other ===
- 2023 : Swiss Hockey Hall of Fame
