= Angela Taylor (ice hockey) =

British ice hockey player

- Born: 24 April 1987 (age 38); Paisley, Scotland, U.K.
- Height: 181 cm (5 ft 11 in)
- Weight: 80 kg (176 lb; 12 st 8 lb)
- Position: Centre
- Shot: Left
- Played for: ZSC Lions; SC Reinach; Slough Phantoms; Lee Valley Lions; New Hampshire Wildcats
- National team: Great Britain
- Playing career: 2002–2018; 2021–present

Angela Taylor (born 24 April 1987) is a British retired ice hockey forward. She is Great Britain's all-time leading goal scorer with 70 points, earning 54 caps for her country.

== Career ==
From 2005 to 2009, Taylor played with the New Hampshire Wildcats women's ice hockey program of the University of New Hampshire. She tallied 59 points in 140 NCAA games, winning four consecutive Hockey East conference championships.

For the 2009–10 season, Taylor played with the Lee Valley Lions in the English National Ice Hockey League (ENIHL; renamed National Ice Hockey League in 2012), the first non-goaltender woman to play in a British men's senior league. She would score 17 points in 14 games, becoming the first woman to score in a British men's senior league and the first to score a hat-trick. That year, she would also play for the Slough Phantoms in the Women's Premier League as they won the championship.

In 2010, she signed with SC Reinach in Switzerland, becoming the first British woman to play professional hockey outside of the UK. She would spend one year at the club before switching to ZSC Lions, where she would play for the next seven seasons.

In April 2018, she announced her retirement from hockey, having won five Swiss championships.

In 2022, Taylor was announced as a new addition to the Premier Sports broadcast team for their coverage of the Elite Ice Hockey League (EIHL) - alongside Aaron Murphy, Paul Adey and Colin Shields.

=== International ===
In 2008 she captained the Great Britain women's national ice hockey team.

She was the fifth player in UK hockey history to reach 50 caps with the women's national team.

== Personal life ==
Taylor was born in Paisley, Renfrewshire in the Central Lowlands of Scotland. She attended secondary school at St Andrew's Academy in Paisley.

She has a bachelor's degree in psychology from the University of New Hampshire.

== Career statistics ==
| | | | Regular season | | | | | Playoffs |
| Season | Team | League | GP | G | A | Pts | PIM | GP | G | A | Pts | PIM |
|---|---|---|---|---|---|---|---|---|---|---|---|---|
| 2010-11 | SC Reinach | SWHL A | 19 | 25 | 19 | 44 | 28 | 4 | 5 | 4 | 9 | 8 |
| 2011-12 | ZSC Lions | SWHL A | 14 | 15 | 14 | 29 | 10 | 6 | 7 | 10 | 17 | 6 |
| 2012–13 | ZSC Lions | SWHL A | 18 | 18 | 30 | 48 | 22 | 8 | 0 | 11 | 11 | 16 |
| 2013-14 | ZSC Lions | SWHL A | 19 | 20 | 43 | 63 | 26 | 6 | 2 | 6 | 8 | 8 |
| 2014-15 | ZSC Lions | SWHL A | 18 | 15 | 22 | 37 | 44 | 8 | 2 | 14 | 16 | 16 |
| 2015-16 | ZSC Lions | SWHL A | 9 | 4 | 9 | 13 | 12 | 6 | 2 | 3 | 5 | 4 |
| 2016-17 | ZSC Lions | SWHL A | 17 | 16 | 16 | 32 | 10 | 5 | 2 | 2 | 4 | 8 |
| 2017-18 | ZSC Lions | SWHL A | 3 | 0 | 1 | 1 | 6 | 5 | 5 | 4 | 9 | 4 |
| SWHL A totals | | | 117 | 113 | 154 | 267 | 158 | 48 | 25 | 54 | 79 | 70 |
