= Julia Marty =

Swiss ice hockey player (born 1988)

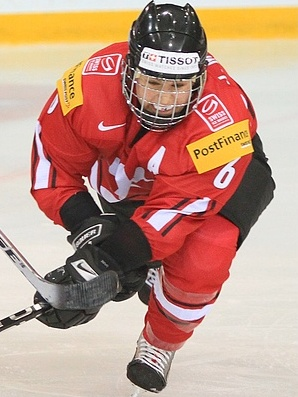
- Marty with Switzerland in 2011
- Born: 16 April 1988 (age 38) Rothenthurm, Schwyz, Switzerland
- Height: 170 cm (5 ft 7 in)
- Weight: 69 kg (152 lb; 10 st 12 lb)
- Position: Defense
- Shoots: Left
- SWHL A team Former teams: EV Bomo Thun; SC Reinach; Neuchâtel Hockey Academy; Linköping HC; Northeastern Huskies; New Hampshire Wildcats; EV Zug
- National team: Switzerland
- Playing career: 2007–present
Medal record
Olympic Games
Bronze medal – third place	2014 Sochi	Ice hockey
World Championship
Bronze medal – third place	2012 United States

Julia Kathrin Marty (born 16 April 1988) is a Swiss ice hockey player, currently playing in the Women's League (SWHL A) with EV Bomo Thun. She is a former eleven-season member of the Swiss national ice hockey team and served as captain for three seasons, including in the women's ice hockey tournament at the 2014 Winter Olympics in Sochi.

== Playing career ==
Prior to her college ice hockey career, Marty played with EV Zug in the Leistungsklasse A (LKA), the top Swiss women's league, from 2003 to 2007. She was a LKA All-Star selection in 2005 and participated in the European Champions Cup, helping EV Zug to a third-place finish in 2004. She also skated for DHC Langenthal and the EHC Wettingen-Baden boys team. In a game versus Russia at the 2012 IIHF Women's World Championship, Marty logged two points (one goal, one assist) in a 5–2 victory, as Switzerland advanced to the semifinals.

=== NCAA ===
Marty played alongside her twin sister Stefanie with the New Hampshire Wildcats women's ice hockey program in the 2007–08 season on defense. She scored three goals and added seven assists for 10 points along with a plus-24 rating in 31 games.

For the 2008–09 season, she transferred to the Northeastern Huskies women's ice hockey program in Boston. Marty set career highs for goals, assists, and points in a season despite playing in only 25 games. She finished the season with four goals and thirteen assists. During the 2010–11 season, on 1 October 2010, Marty played in a 4–4 tie vs. Syracuse. The Syracuse team featured her twin sister Stefanie. It was the first time the sisters had ever played against each other in their NCAA careers. On 24 October 2010, she registered her first goal of the season. She also accumulated three assists as Northeastern defeated RPI, 5–1. On 24 October, Marty's four-point performance was the first by a Huskies player since Chelsey Jones recorded five points against the Maine Black Bears on 3 December 2006.

== Career statistics ==
=== Club ===
			Regular season					Playoffs
Season	Team	League	GP	G	A	Pts	PIM	GP	G	A	Pts	PIM
2003-04	EV Zug Damen	SWHL A	-	8	10	18	-	-	-	-	-	-
2004-05	EV Zug Damen	SWHL A	-	-	-	-	-	-	-	-	-	-
2006-07	EV Zug Damen	SWHL A	-	-	-	-	-	-	-	-	-	-
2007-08	New Hampshire Wildcats	NCAA	31	3	7	10	6	-	-	-	-	-
2008-09	Northeastern Huskies	NCAA	25	4	13	17	18	-	-	-	-	-
2009-10	Northeastern Huskies	NCAA	20	1	6	7	14	-	-	-	-	-
2010-11	Northeastern Huskies	NCAA	37	5	9	14	20	-	-	-	-	-
2011-12	SC Reinach Damen	SWHL A	15	8	10	18	22	5	3	5	8	0
2012-13	SC Reinach Damen	SWHL A	13	12	11	23	18	5	2	2	4	4
2013-14	Linköping HC	Riksserien	23	3	14	17	10	3	0	1	1	0
2014-15	SC Reinach Damen	SWHL A	9	5	8	13	0	4	0	2	2	4
2016-17	Neuchâtel Hockey Academy	SWHL A	10	7	7	14	4	5	1	2	3	0
2016-17	Neuchâtel Hockey Academy	Swiss Women Cup	1	0	2	2	0	-	-	-	-	-
2017-18	SC Reinach Damen	SWHL A	14	4	8	12	8	4	2	2	4	2
2017-18	SC Reinach Damen	Swiss Women Cup	1	0	0	0	2	-	-	-	-	-
2018-19	SC Reinach Damen	SWHL A	12	9	4	13	6	-	-	-	-	-
2019-20	SC Reinach Damen	SWHL A	16	6	6	12	10	5	5	2	7	2
2019-20	SC Reinach Damen	Swiss Women Cup	4	7	3	10	0	-	-	-	-	-
2020-21	SC Reinach Damen	SWHL A	15	4	6	10	10	-	-	-	-	-
2021-22	EV Bomo Thun	SWHL A	17	4	11	15	8	3	0	1	1	2
2021-22	EV Bomo Thun	National Cup	2	0	3	3	2	-	-	-	-	-
2022-23	EV Bomo Thun	SWHL A	19	6	7	13	20	9	4	1	5	6
2022-23	EV Bomo Thun	National Cup	4	2	5	7	2	-	-	-	-	-
2023-24	SC Bern Frauen	SWHL A	-	-	-	-	-	-	-	-	-	-
SWHL A totals			140	73	88	161	106	40	17	17	34	20
NCAA totals			113	13	35	48	58	-	-	-	-	-
Riksserien totals			23	3	14	17	10	3	0	1	1	0

=== International ===
Year	Team	Event	GP	G	A	Pts	PIM
2004	Switzerland	WC	4	2	0	2	0
2005	Switzerland	WC D1	5	2	2	4	4
2006	Switzerland	OG	5	2	1	3	4
2007	Switzerland	WC	4	0	1	1	6
2008	Switzerland	WC	5	0	2	2	12
2009	Switzerland	WC	4	0	0	0	0
2010	Switzerland	OG	5	0	1	1	2
2011	Switzerland	WC	5	1	2	3	6
2012	Switzerland	WC	6	5	2	7	6
2013	Switzerland	WC	5	1	1	2	6
2014	Switzerland	OG	6	0	0	0	0
2015	Switzerland	WC	4	1	2	3	4
WC totals			42	12	12	24	44
OG totals			14	3	4	7	10

== Honours and achievements ==
=== NCAA ===
- 2008–09, All-Hockey East Honorable Mention
- Hockey East Player of the Week 10 November 2008
- Hockey East Player of the Week 25 October 2010
- Julia Marty, 2011 Hockey East All-Tournament team

=== Riksserien ===
- 2013-2014 : Champion with Linköping HC

=== WC ===
- 2005 : Gold Medal in Division D1
- 2005 : Most Goals by a Defenseman in Division D1 (2)
- 2005 : Most Points by a Defenseman in Division D1 (4)
- 2011 : Top3 Player on Team
- 2012 : Bronze Medal
- 2012 : Most Goals by a Defenseman (5)
- 2015 : Top3 Player on Team

=== OG ===
- 2014 : Bronze Medal

=== Other ===
- 2015 : Swiss Ice Hockey Woman of the Year
- 2022 : Swiss Hockey Hall of Fame

== See also ==
- List of Olympic medalist families
