= Nicole Bullo =

Swiss ice hockey player (born 1987)

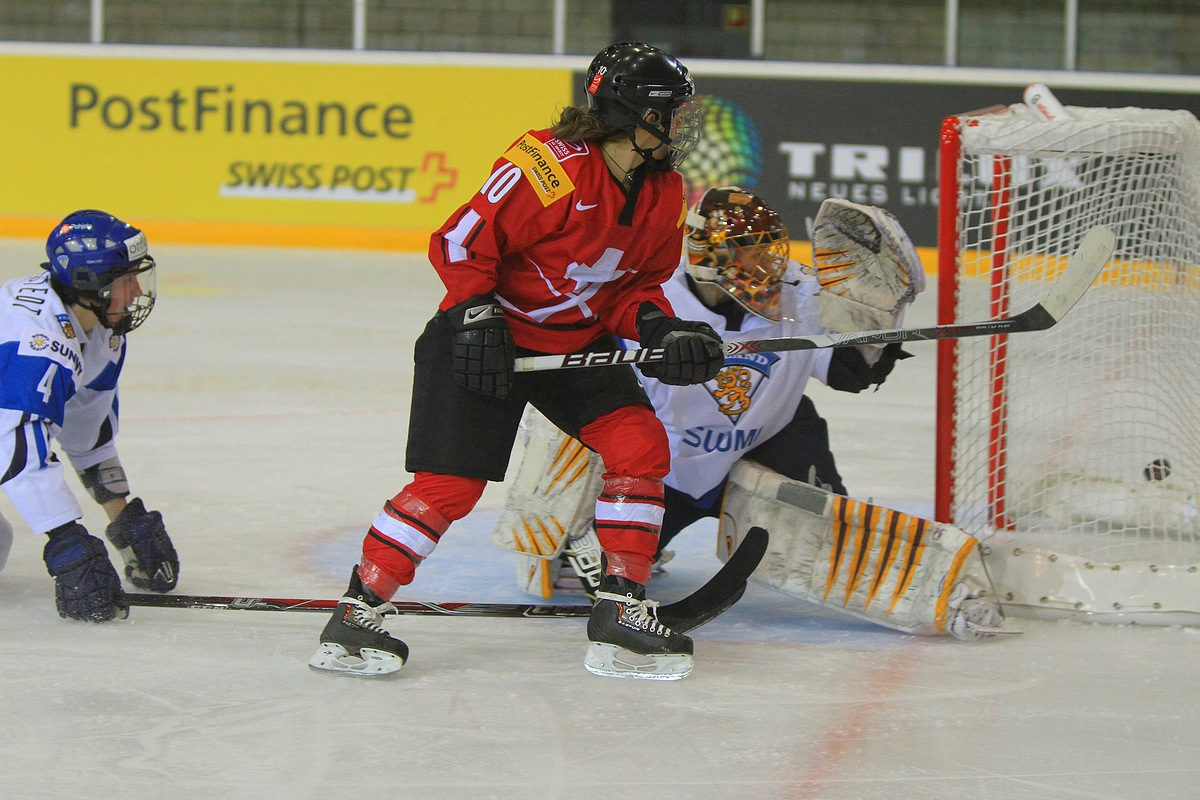
- Born: 18 July 1987 (age 39) Claro, Switzerland
- Height: 1.60 m (5 ft 3 in)
- Weight: 54 kg (119 lb; 8 st 7 lb)
- Position: Defense
- Shoots: Left
- SWHL A team Former teams: HC Ambrì-Piotta; HC Lugano; Küssnachter SC
- National team: Switzerland
- Playing career: 2003–present
Medal record
Olympic Games
Bronze medal – third place	2014 Sochi	Ice hockey
World Championship
Bronze medal – third place	2012 United States

Nicole Bullo (born 18 July 1987) is a Swiss ice hockey defenseman and member of the Swiss national team. She has played with the HC Ambrì-Piotta Girls in the Women's League (PFWL/SWHL A) since 2024.

Bullo has represented Switzerland at five Winter Olympic Games and eleven IIHF Women's World Championship tournaments.

== Playing career ==
At age seventeen, Bullo made her debut with the Swiss national team in the 2004 IIHF Women's World Championship. She scored a goal and an assist across four games to rank third on the team in scoring and, despite Switzerland being relegated to Division I at tournament's end, it was a strong showing for the young defender.

The following year, she contributed a goal and recorded a +6 plus–minus in five Division 1, Group A games of the 2005 IIHF Women's World Championship, helping Switzerland earn promotion back to the Top Division, where they have since remained.

Bullo made her Olympic debut with the Swiss delegation at the 2006 Winter Olympics in Turin. She played in all five games of the women's ice hockey tournament and recorded one assist.

In total, she represented Switzerland in every World Championship or Olympic tournament during 2004 to 2022, excepting the World Championship tournaments in 2015 and 2021. Her career is highlighted by a World Championship bronze medal in 2012 IIHF Women's World Championship and an Olympic bronze medal in the women's ice hockey tournament at the 2014 Winter Olympics in Sochi.

Bullo officially retired from the Swiss national team after the 2022 Winter Olympics in Beijing. the all-time point leader amongst Switzerland defenders.

== Career statistics ==
=== Club ===
			Regular season					Playoffs
Season	Team	League	GP	G	A	Pts	PIM	GP	G	A	Pts	PIM
2003-04	Ladies Team Lugano	SWHL A	-	10	14	24	-	-	-	-	-	-
2004-05	Ladies Team Lugano	SWHL A	-	-	-	-	-	-	-	-	-	-
2005-06	Ladies Team Lugano	SWHL A	-	-	-	-	-	-	-	-	-	-
2006-07	Ladies Team Lugano	SWHL A	-	-	-	-	-	-	-	-	-	-
2007-08	KSC Küssnacht am Rigi Damen	SWHL A	20	12	14	26	22	4	0	2	2	2
2008-09	Ladies Team Lugano	SWHL A	22	18	10	28	6	5	1	2	3	18
2009-10	Ladies Team Lugano	SWHL A	15	6	11	17	12	5	1	4	5	6
2010-11	Ladies Team Lugano	SWHL A	20	8	21	29	24	6	1	4	5	6
2011-12	Ladies Team Lugano	SWHL A	20	17	22	39	18	7	3	8	11	8
2012-13	Ladies Team Lugano	SWHL A	18	21	19	40	14	9	6	9	15	2
2013-14	Ladies Team Lugano	SWHL A	19	16	18	34	14	5	2	7	9	2
2014-15	Ladies Team Lugano	SWHL A	13	6	13	19	16	8	0	5	5	6
2015-16	Ladies Team Lugano	SWHL A	17	7	10	17	8	7	3	0	3	6
2016-17	Ladies Team Lugano	SWHL A	18	10	13	23	14	7	1	4	5	10
2016-17	Ladies Team Lugano	Swiss Women Cup	3	0	5	5	2	-	-	-	-	-
2017-18	Ladies Team Lugano	SWHL A	18	7	14	21	10	6	2	3	5	6
2017-18	Ladies Team Lugano	Swiss Women Cup	1	0	0	0	0	-	-	-	-	-
2018-19	Ladies Team Lugano	SWHL A	10	3	6	9	4	6	0	3	3	4
2018-19	Ladies Team Lugano	Swiss Women Cup	4	2	3	5	4	-	-	-	-	-
2019-20	Ladies Team Lugano	SWHL A	18	6	14	20	10	5	1	1	2	2
2019-20	Ladies Team Lugano	Swiss Women Cup	4	4	8	12	0	-	-	-	-	-
2020-21	Ladies Team Lugano	SWHL A	20	6	11	17	20	6	0	2	2	2
2021-22	Ladies Team Lugano	SWHL A	22	6	24	30	30	5	0	3	3	2
2021-22	Ladies Team Lugano	National Cup	4	1	2	3	0	-	-	-	-	-
2022-23	Ladies Team Lugano	SWHL A	21	7	12	19	20	4	0	4	4	6
2022-23	Ladies Team Lugano	National Cup	2	0	2	2	0	-	-	-	-	-
2023-24	HC Ambrì-Piotta Girls	SWHL A	25	4	21	25	24	5	0	0	0	4
2023-24	HC Ambrì-Piotta Girls	National Cup	1	0	0	0	0	-	-	-	-	-
SWHL A totals			316	170	267	437	266	100	21	61	82	92

=== International ===
Year	Team	Event	GP	G	A	Pts	PIM
2004	Switzerland	WC	4	1	1	2	2
2005	Switzerland	WC D1	5	1	0	1	2
2006	Switzerland	OG	5	0	1	1	6
2007	Switzerland	WC	4	0	0	0	8
2008	Switzerland	WC	5	0	0	0	4
2009	Switzerland	WC	4	2	1	3	2
2010	Switzerland	OG	5	0	0	0	6
2011	Switzerland	WC	5	2	0	2	0
2012	Switzerland	WC	6	1	2	3	4
2013	Switzerland	WC	5	0	1	1	0
2014	Switzerland	OG	6	0	3	3	2
2016	Switzerland	WC	5	0	2	2	6
2017	Switzerland	WC	6	2	1	3	0
2018	Switzerland	OG	6	0	1	1	2
2019	Switzerland	WC	5	0	1	1	0
2022	Switzerland	OG	7	0	0	0	2
WC totals			54	9	9	18	28
OG totals			29	0	5	5	18

== Honors and achievements ==
=== SWHL A ===
The Women's League is Switzerland's national championship league in women's ice hockey. It was founded as the Leistungsklasse A (LK A) in 1986 and was known as the Swiss Women's Hockey League A (SWHL A) during 2014 to 2019.

- 2006–07 : Champion with Ladies Team Lugano
- 2008–09 : Champion with Ladies Team Lugano
- 2009–10 : Champion with Ladies Team Lugano
- 2013–14 : Champion with Ladies Team Lugano
- 2014–15 : Champion with Ladies Team Lugano
- 2018–19 : Champion with Ladies Team Lugano
- 2020–21 : Champion with Ladies Team Lugano
- 2021–22 : Women's League Best Defender (co-winner with Sidney Morin)

=== National Cup ===
The National Cup, distinguished as the National Cup Frauen (lit. 'National Cup Women'), is a national tournament for club teams organized by the Swiss Ice Hockey Federation. The tournament is also known as the Swiss Women Cup, the Swiss Women's Cup, the Swiss Women's Hockey Cup, and the Ochsner Swiss Women's Cup.

- 2016–17 : Cup Winner with Ladies Team Lugano
- 2021–22 : Cup Winner with HC Ladies Lugano

=== World Championship ===
- 2005 : First Place in Division I, Group A (promoted to Top Division)
- 2011 : Top-3 Player on Team
- 2012 : Bronze Medal
- 2012 : Top-3 Player on Team
- 2013 : Top-3 Player on Team

=== Olympic Games ===
- 2014 : Bronze Medal

=== Other ===
- 2006 : Swiss Ice Hockey Woman of the Year
- 2011 : Swiss Ice Hockey Woman of the Year
- 2012 : Swiss Ice Hockey Woman of the Year
