= Claudia Riechsteiner =

Swiss ice hockey player

- Born: January 3, 1986 (age 39); Sursee, Switzerland
- Height: 5 ft 6 in (168 cm)
- Weight: 143 lb (65 kg; 10 st 3 lb)
- Position: Defence
- Shoots: Left
- National team: Switzerland
- Playing career: 2001–present

Claudia Riechsteiner (born 3 January 1986 in Sursee, Switzerland) is a Swiss ice hockey defender.

== International career ==
Riechsteiner was selected for the Switzerland national women's ice hockey team in the 2010 Winter Olympics. She played in all five games, but did not register a point.

Riechsteiner has also appeared for Switzerland at two IIHF Women's World Championships at the Division I level. Her first appearance came in 2001.

== Career statistics ==
=== International career ===
| Year | Team | Event | GP | G | A | Pts | PIM |
|---|---|---|---|---|---|---|---|
| 2001 | Switzerland | WW DI | 4 | 0 | 0 | 0 | 2 |
| 2005 | Switzerland | WW DI | 5 | 1 | 3 | 4 | 0 |
| 2010 | Switzerland | Oly | 5 | 0 | 0 | 0 | 0 |
