= Switzerland women's national under-18 ice hockey team =

Switzerland
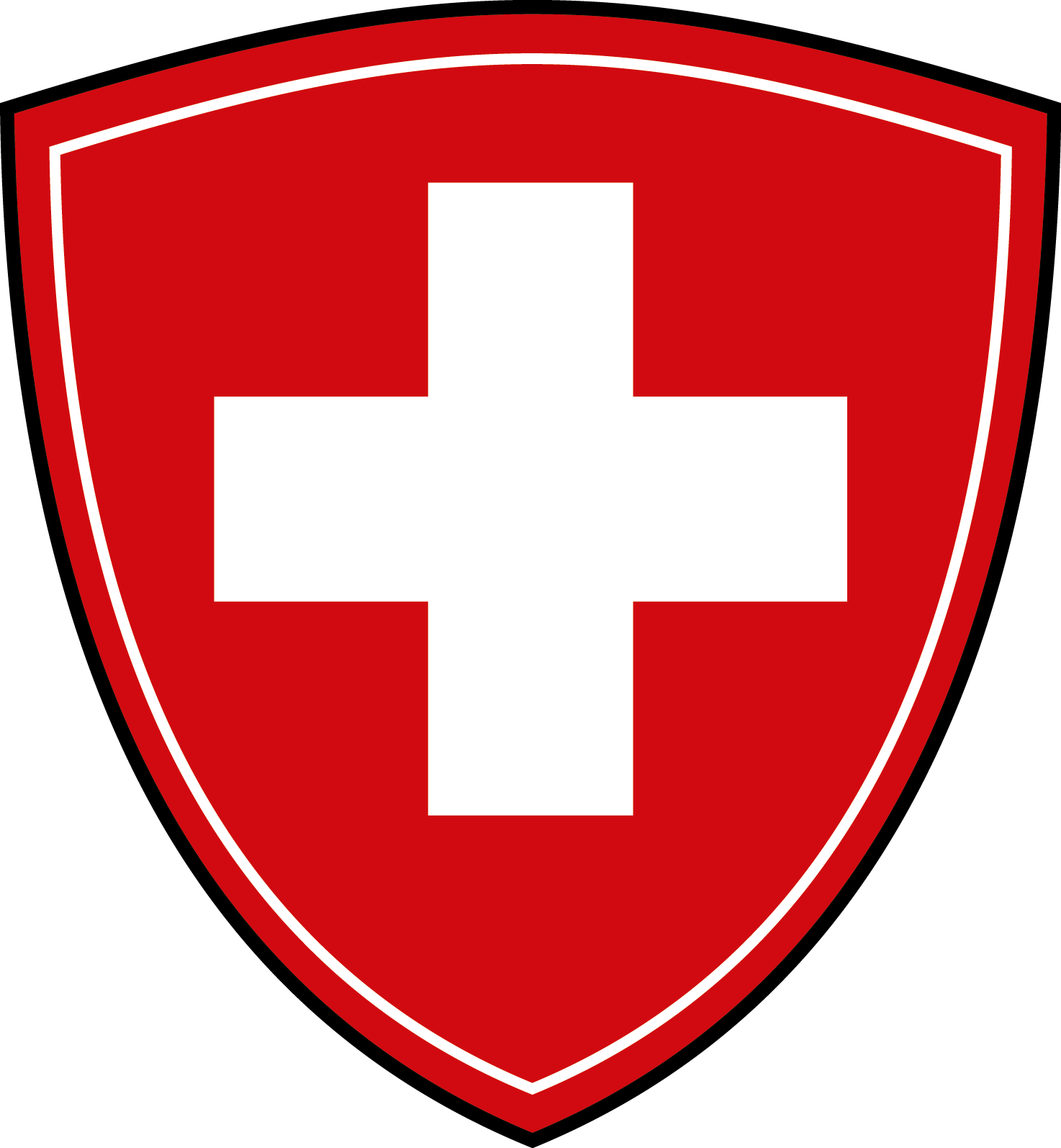
- Association: Schweizerischer Eishockeyverband
- General manager: Lars Weibel
- Head coach: Melanie Häfliger
- Assistants: Colin Muller; Evelina Raselli; Silvano Brasi
- Captain: Naemi Herzig (2025)
- Most games: Karin Williner (22)
- Top scorer: Alina Müller (24)
- Most points: Alina Müller (33)
- Team colors
- IIHF code: SUI
Home colours	Away colours

First international
- Sweden 4 – 1 Switzerland (Calgary, Canada; January 7, 2008)

Biggest win
- Switzerland 15 – 1 Kazakhstan (Piestany, Slovakia; April 3, 2010)

Biggest defeat
- Canada 16 – 1 Switzerland (Fussen, Germany; January 5, 2009)

IIHF U18 Women's World Championship
- Appearances: 9 (first in 2008)
- Best result: 6th (first in 2019)

International record (W–L–T)
- 33–24–0

The Swiss women's national under-18 ice hockey team (German: Schweizer U18-Eishockeynationalmannschaft der Frauen; French: Équipe de Suisse féminine de hockey sur glace des moins de 18 ans; Italian: Nazionale femminile under 18 di hockey su ghiaccio della Svizzera) is one of two national under-18 ice hockey teams of Switzerland. The team is organized by the Swiss Ice Hockey Federation (SIHF) and represents Switzerland at the International Ice Hockey Federation's U18 Women's World Championship and other international tournaments and events.

== U18 Women's World Championship record ==
Year	GP	W	OTW	OTL	L	GF	GA	Pts	Rank
(Canada) 2008	5	2	0	0	3	13	25	6	7th place
(Germany) 2009	5	1	0	2 (Note: One overtime loss and one shootout loss in the placement round)	2	11	31	5	8th place ( Relegated to Division I)
(Slovakia) 2010	5	5	0	0	0	44	5	15	9th place (1st in Division I; promoted to Top Division)
(Sweden) 2011	6	2	0	0	4	14	23	6	7th place
(Czech Republic) 2012	6	2	0	1 (Note: Overtime loss in the relegation round)	3	16	31	7	8th place ( Relegated to Division I)
(Switzerland) 2013	5	3	0	1 (Note: Shootout loss in the preliminary round)	1	17	6	10	10th place (2nd in Division I)
(Germany) 2014	5	4	0	1 (Note: Overtime loss in the preliminary round)	0	19	4	13	9th place (1st in Division I Group A; promoted to Top Division)
(United States) 2015	5	3	1 (Note: Shootout win in the relegation series)	0	1	10	8	11	7th place
(Canada) 2016	5	4	0	0	1	16	6	12	7th place
(Czech Republic) 2017	5	2	2 (Note: One shootout win in the preliminary round and one shootout win in the relegation series)	0	1	13	9	10	7th place
(Russia) 2018	5	2	0	0	3	16	12	6	7th place
(Japan) 2019	5	2	0	1 (Note: Shootout loss in the playoff round)	2	7	9	7	6th place
(Slovakia) 2020	5	2	1 (Note: Overtime win in the preliminary round)	1	2	10	8	9	7th place
(Sweden) ~~2021~~	Cancelled due to the COVID-19 pandemic								
(United States) 2022	5	3	0	0	2	11	7	9	7th place
(Sweden) 2023	5	3	0	0	2	12	9	9	7th place
(Switzerland) 2024	5	1	0	1	3	3	16	4	7th place
(Finland) 2025	4	1	0	1	2	8	14	4	5th place

== Team ==
=== Current roster ===
Roster for the 2025 IIHF U18 Women's World Championship.

Head coach: Melanie Häfliger
Assistant coaches: Colin Muller, Evelina Raselli, Silvano Brasi (goaltender)

No.	Pos.	Name	Height	Weight	Birthdate	Team
1	G	Amaya Iseli	1.76 m (5 ft 9 in)	72 kg (159 lb)	12 January 2007 (age 19)	(Switzerland) HC Dragon Thun U20
2	D	Mila Croll	1.63 m (5 ft 4 in)	56 kg (123 lb)	14 August 2008 (age 18)	(Switzerland) SC Bern
3	F	Aiyana Vuillemin	1.63 m (5 ft 4 in)	53 kg (117 lb)	18 August 2007 (age 19)	(Switzerland) SC Langenthal
5	D	Miriana Bottoni	1.70 m (5 ft 7 in)	60 kg (130 lb)	2 June 2008 (age 18)	(Switzerland) Hockey Grischun Sud U17
7	D	Anaïs Rohner	1.60 m (5 ft 3 in)	56 kg (123 lb)	9 August 2009 (age 17)	(Switzerland) SC Langenthal
8	F	Jil Baker	1.70 m (5 ft 7 in)	65 kg (143 lb)	23 February 2009 (age 17)	(Switzerland) EHC Winterthur*
9	F	Livia Tschannen	1.70 m (5 ft 7 in)	65 kg (143 lb)	5 October 2008 (age 18)	(Switzerland) Fribourg Ladies HC
10	D	Ilana Leibundgut	1.74 m (5 ft 9 in)	68 kg (150 lb)	9 January 2007 (age 19)	(Switzerland) SC Bern
11	F	Elisa Dalessi – A	1.53 m (5 ft 0 in)	51 kg (112 lb)	30 January 2007 (age 19)	(Switzerland) HC Ambrì-Piotta
12	F	Hannah Estermann	1.76 m (5 ft 9 in)	62 kg (137 lb)	13 March 2008 (age 18)	(Switzerland) EHC Dübendorf U17
13	F	Jael Manetsch	1.64 m (5 ft 5 in)	58 kg (128 lb)	3 September 2007 (age 19)	(Switzerland) EV Zug
15	D	Sonja Inkamp	1.60 m (5 ft 3 in)	60 kg (130 lb)	21 February 2007 (age 19)	(Switzerland) GCK Lions Zurich
16	F	Norina Müller – A	1.60 m (5 ft 3 in)	50 kg (110 lb)	24 August 2008 (age 18)	(Switzerland) Fribourg Ladies HC
17	D	Lorena Wrann	1.70 m (5 ft 7 in)	62 kg (137 lb)	3 April 2007 (age 19)	(Switzerland) EV Zug
18	D	Laure Mériguet	1.73 m (5 ft 8 in)	65 kg (143 lb)	15 August 2008 (age 18)	(Switzerland) Genève Futur Hockey (Note: Genève Futur Hockey is a junior team of Genève-Servette Hockey Club that plays in the SIHF's U17-Elit league.)
19	F	Sarah Mettler	1.65 m (5 ft 5 in)	55 kg (121 lb)	5 August 2010 (age 16)	(Switzerland) EHC Winterthur*
21	F	Laelia Huwler	1.63 m (5 ft 4 in)	60 kg (130 lb)	4 September 2009 (age 17)	(Switzerland) EHC Dübendorf*
22	F	Lorie-Lou Besson	1.66 m (5 ft 5 in)	56 kg (123 lb)	3 October 2008 (age 18)	(Switzerland) EHC Frauenfeld U17
24	F	Luana Birnstiel	1.55 m (5 ft 1 in)	56 kg (123 lb)	5 May 2008 (age 18)	(Switzerland) EHC Olten U17
25	F	Sarina Ochsner	1.69 m (5 ft 7 in)	59 kg (130 lb)	14 March 2007 (age 19)	(Switzerland) GCK Lions Zurich
26	F	Naemi Herzig – C	1.70 m (5 ft 7 in)	68 kg (150 lb)	21 March 2007 (age 19)	(Switzerland) EV Zug
27	F	Céline Bonassi	1.67 m (5 ft 6 in)	60 kg (130 lb)	16 January 2008 (age 18)	(Switzerland) SC Bern
28	D	Sarina Messikommer	1.66 m (5 ft 5 in)	65 kg (143 lb)	12 October 2008 (age 18)	(Switzerland) EHC Wetzikon U17
29	G	Norina Schrupkowski	1.75 m (5 ft 9 in)	68 kg (150 lb)	24 October 2009 (age 17)	(Switzerland) GCK Lions Zurich
30	G	Stella Zagnoli	1.73 m (5 ft 8 in)	62 kg (137 lb)	6 October 2008 (age 18)	(Switzerland) EHC Dübendorf U17

* indicates player is active in the junior department of the indicated club but affiliation to a specific team within the department is unclear or unknown.

Team biometrics

- Average age: 16
- Average height: 1.67 m (5 ft 6 in)
- Average weight: 61 kg (134 lb)

=== Head coach history ===
List is restricted to coaches who were officially named to the head coach position for one edition or more of the IIHF U18 Women's World Championship. Top division tournament unless otherwise noted.

- Jorg Toggwiler: 2008, 2009
- Dominik Schar: 2010-D1, 2011, 2012
- Georgios Mourouzidis: 2013-D1, 2014-D1A
- Andrea Kroni: 2015, 2016, 2017
- Steve Huard: 2018, 2019
- Florence Schelling: 2020
- Melanie Häfliger: 2021, 2022, 2023, 2024, 2025

=== Captaincy history ===
As of 2025, only two players have served as team captain for more than one IIHF U18 Women's World Championship tournament: Sarah Forster, in 2010 and 2011, and Naemi Herzig, in 2024 and 2025.

- 2008: Anja Stiefel
- 2009: Laura Benz
- 2010: Sarah Forster
- 2011: Sarah Forster
- 2012: Phoebe Stänz
- 2013: Stephanie Lehner
- 2014: Reica Staiger
- 2015: Simone Minder
- 2016: Kaleigh Quennec
- 2017: Noemi Ryhner
- 2018: Stefanie Wetli
- 2019: Lena Marie Lutz
- 2020: Julina Gianola
- 2023: Elena Gaberell
- 2024: Naemi Herzig
- 2025: Naemi Herzig

== Player awards and honors ==
=== World Championship ===
==== Top Division ====
Best Forward
Selected by the tournament directorate.

- 2016: Alina Müller

Best Goaltender
Selected by the tournament directorate.

- 2019: Saskia Maurer

All Star Team
Selected by members of the media. Note that All Star honors were not awarded during 2008 to 2012 nor in 2014 and 2017.

- 2016: Alina Müller (F)
- 2019: Saskia Maurer (G)

Top-3 Players on Team
Selected by the coaches.

- 2008: Sophie Anthamatten (G), Laura Benz (D), Sara Benz (F)
- 2009: Sophie Anthamatten (G), Laura Benz (D), Evelina Raselli (F)
- 2011: Tamara Klossner (G), Lara Stalder (F)
- 2012: Phoebe Stänz (D), Nicole Gubler (F), Isabel Waidacher (F)
- 2015: Tess Allemann (F), Andrea Brändli (G), Alina Müller (F)
- 2016: Rahel Enzler (F), Alina Müller (F), Shannon Sigrist (D)
- 2017: Saskia Maurer (G), Lisa Rüedi (F), Noemi Ryhner (F)
- 2018: Rahel Enzler (F), Lisa Rüedi (F), Stefanie Wetli (D)
- 2019: Lara Christen (D), Saskia Maurer (G), Alicia Pagnamenta (F)
- 2020: Lara Christen (F), Emma Ingold (F), Caroline Spies (G)
- 2022: Alessia Baechler (D), Alina Marti (F), Alena Lynn Rossel (D)
- 2023: Alessia Baechler (D), Talina Benderer (G), Ivana Wey (F)
- 2024: Talina Benderer (G), Sonja Inkamp (D), Ivana Wey (F)
- 2025: Naemi Herzig (F), Sonja Inkamp (D), Norina Müller (F)

==== Division 1 ====
Best Defenseman
Selected by the tournament directorate

- 2010: Lara Stalder

Best Forward
Selected by the tournament directorate

- 2010: Sara Benz
- 2013: Alina Müller
- 2014: Alina Müller

Best Goaltender
Selected by the tournament directorate

- 2014: Andrea Brändli

Best Player on Team
Selected by the coaches.

- 2013: Karin Williner (D)
- 2014: Dominique Rüegg (F)

== See also ==
- Switzerland women's national ice hockey team
- Women's League
