= Laura Trachsel =

Swiss ice hockey player

- Born: 16 January 1994 (age 32)
- Height: 1.61 m (5 ft 3 in)
- Weight: 65 kg (143 lb; 10 st 3 lb)
- Position: Forward
- Shoots: Left
- CIS team: UBC Thunderbirds
- National team: Switzerland

Laura Trachsel (born 16 January 1994) is a Swiss ice hockey player for SC Weinfelden and the Swiss national team. She participated at the 2015 IIHF Women's World Championship.
