= Rahel Michielin =

Swiss ice hockey player

- Born: October 11, 1990 (age 34); Frauenfeld, Switzerland
- Height: 5 ft 4 in (163 cm)
- Weight: 115 lb (52 kg; 8 st 3 lb)
- Position: Forward
- Shoots: Right
- SWHL A team: SC Weinfelden Ladies
- National team: Switzerland
- Playing career: 2008–present

Rahel Michielin
Medal record

Women's ice hockey

Representing Switzerland

IIHF World Women's Championships
Bronze medal – third place	2012 United States	Tournament

Rahel Michielin (born 11 October 1990 in Frauenfeld, Switzerland) is a Swiss ice hockey forward.

== International career ==
Michielin was selected for the Switzerland national women's ice hockey team in the 2010 Winter Olympics. She played in all five games, though she did not score a point.

Michielin has also appeared for Switzerland at four IIHF Women's World Championships. Her first appearance came in 2008. She was a member of the bronze medal winning team at the 2012 championships.

Michielin made one appearance for the Switzerland women's national under-18 ice hockey team, at the 2008 IIHF World Women's U18 Championship.

== Career statistics ==
=== International career ===
Year	Team	Event	GP	G	A	Pts	PIM
2008	Switzerland U18	U18	5	0	1	1	6
2008	Switzerland	WW	5	0	0	0	4
2009	Switzerland	WW	4	0	0	0	0
2010	Switzerland	Oly	5	0	0	0	2
2011	Switzerland	WW	5	0	0	0	0
2012	Switzerland	WW	6	0	0	0	2
