= Kateřina Flachsová =

Czech ice hockey player

- Born: 29 September 1986 (age 39)
- Height: 171 cm (5 ft 7 in)
- Weight: 63 kg (139 lb; 9 st 13 lb)
- Position: Defense
- Shoots: Left
- Extraliga team Former teams: HC 2001 Kladno: SC Reinach Damen; DHC Langenthal; EHV Sabres
- National team: Czech Republic
- Playing career: c. 2003–present

Kateřina Flachsová (born 29 September 1986) is a Czech ice hockey player and alternate captain of HC 2001 Kladno in the Czech Women's Extraliga. As a member of the Czech national team, she participated in eleven IIHF Women's World Championships: the Top Division tournaments in 2013 and 2016; the Division I Group A tournaments in 2012, 2014, and 2015; the Division I tournaments in 2004, 2005, 2007, 2008, and 2009; and the Division II tournament in 2011. She last represented the Czech Republic in international competition in 2016.

Flachsová's extensive club career has primarily been played in the Czech Women's Extraliga with HC 2001 Kladno. However, she spent several seasons playing abroad in Austria and Switzerland, first in the Elite Women's Hockey League (EWHL) with the EHV Sabres and, later, in the Leistungsklasse A (LKA) with DHC Langenthal and, after the league was renamed the Swiss Women's Hockey League A (SWHL A; rebranded Women's League in 2020), with SC Reinach Damen.
