= Sophie Anthamatten =

Swiss ice hockey player (born 1991)

- Born: July 26, 1991 (age 34) Saas-Grund, Switzerland
- Height: 5 ft 7 in (170 cm)
- Weight: 163 lb (74 kg; 11 st 9 lb)
- Position: Goaltender
- Catches: Left
- SwissDiv1 team: EHC Saastal
- National team: Switzerland
- Playing career: 2008–present

Sophie Anthamatten
Medal record

Women's ice hockey

Representing Switzerland

Olympic Games
Bronze medal – third place	2014 Sochi	Team

IIHF World Women's Championships
Bronze medal – third place	2012 United States	Tournament

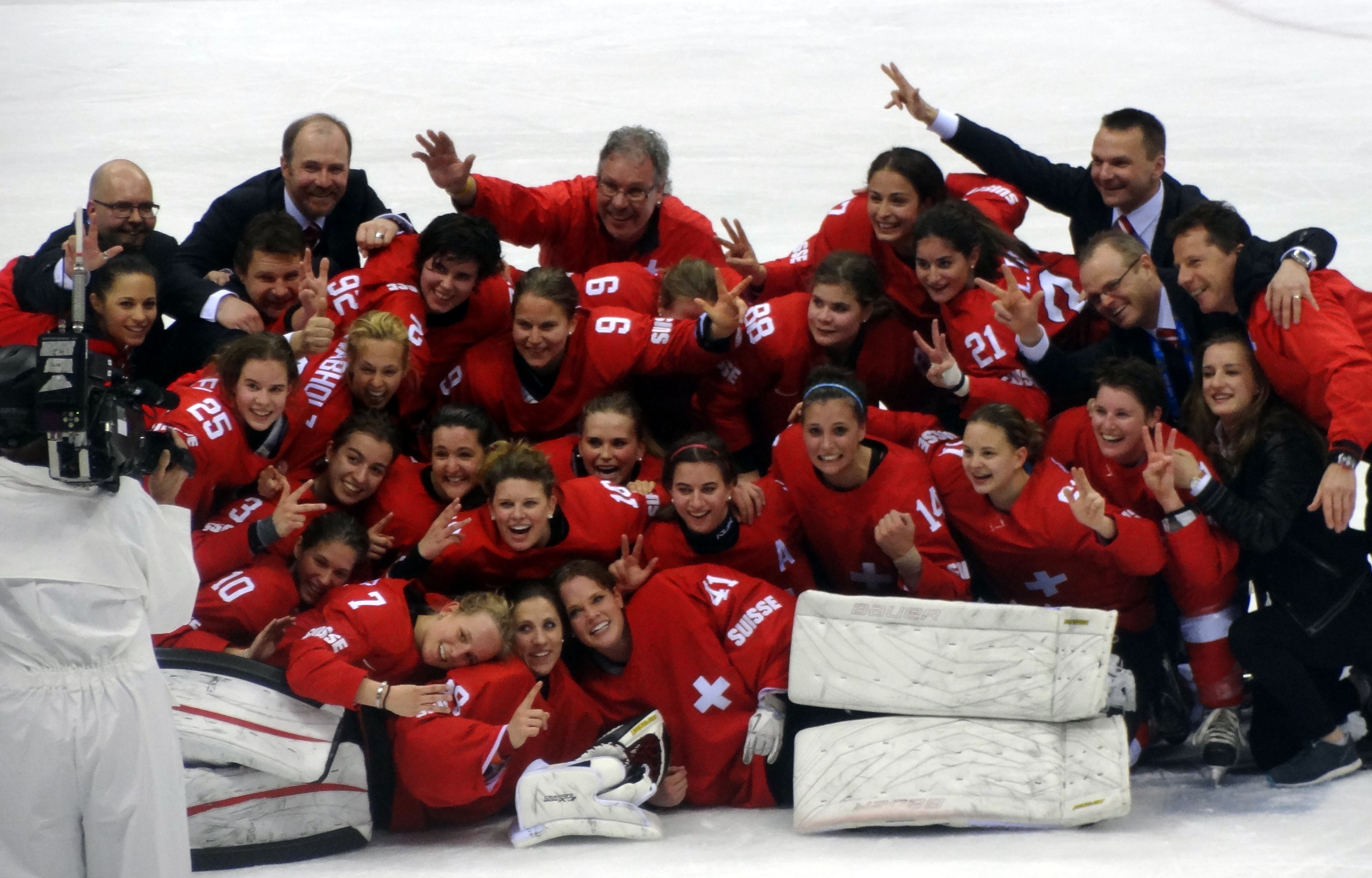
XXII Winter Olympic Games, Sochi. Women’s Ice Hockey Bronze Medal Game: Sweden vs. Switzerland

Sophie Celine Anthamatten (born 26 July 1991 in Saas-Grund, Switzerland) is a Swiss ice hockey goaltender.

== International career ==
Anthamatten was selected for the Switzerland national women's ice hockey team in the 2010 Winter Olympics, but did not play during the tournament.

Anthamatten has also appeared for Switzerland at three IIHF Women's World Championships. Her first appearance came in 2011 IIHF Women's World Championship, where she allowed six goals in 25 minutes of playing time. She also played at the 2012 IIHF Women's World Championship, and once at the 2013 IIHF Women's World Championship. Her best performance came in 2012, when she played in 2 games, with a GAA of 3.38. She served as the backup in the medal round of the 2012 tournament, winning a bronze medal behind Florence Schelling

She also represented her country at junior level, playing for the Switzerland women's national under-18 ice hockey team. In 2008, she played in five games, winning two, with a goals against average of 4.81. In 2009, she played in five games, winning one and posting a GAA of 5.59

== Career statistics ==
=== International career ===
Year	Team	Event	GP	W	L	T	MIN	GA	SO	GAA	SV%
2008	Switzerland	U18	5	2	3	0	299:30	24	0	4.81	90.08
2009	Switzerland	U18	5	1	0	4	290:00	27	0	5.59	88.66
2011	Switzerland	WW	1	0	0	0	25:58	6	0	13.86	76.00
2012	Switzerland	WW	2	0	1	0	70:58	4	0	3.38	89.19
2013	Switzerland	WW	1	0	0	0	47:37	10	0	12.60	84.38
