= Laura Benz =

Swiss ice hockey player (born 1992)

- Born: 25 August 1992 (age 34) Zürich, Switzerland
- Height: 5 ft 8 in (173 cm)
- Weight: 139 lb (63 kg; 9 st 13 lb)
- Position: Defence
- Shoots: Left
- LNA team: ZSC Lions
- National team: Switzerland
- Playing career: 2008–present
Medal record
Olympic Games
Bronze medal – third place	2014 Sochi	Team

Laura Benz (born 25 August 1992) is a Swiss ice hockey defender.

== International career ==
Benz was selected for the Switzerland national women's ice hockey team in the 2010 Winter Olympics. She played in all five games, scoring a goal.

Benz has also appeared for Switzerland at one IIHF Women's World Championship. Her first appearance came in 2009.

Benz made three appearances for the Switzerland women's national under-18 ice hockey team, at two levels of the IIHF World Women's U18 Championships. Her first came in 2008.

== Personal life ==
Her twin sister Sara Benz is also a hockey player.

== Career statistics ==
Year	Team	Event	GP	G	A	Pts	PIM
2008	Switzerland U18	U18	5	0	1	1	18
2009	Switzerland U18	U18	4	0	1	1	4
2009	Switzerland	WW	4	1	0	1	4
2010	Switzerland	Oly	5	0	2	2	2
2010	Switzerland U18	U18 DI	5	5	2	7	14

== See also ==
- List of Olympic medalist families
