= Cornèr Arena =

Ice hockey arena in Lugano, Switzerland

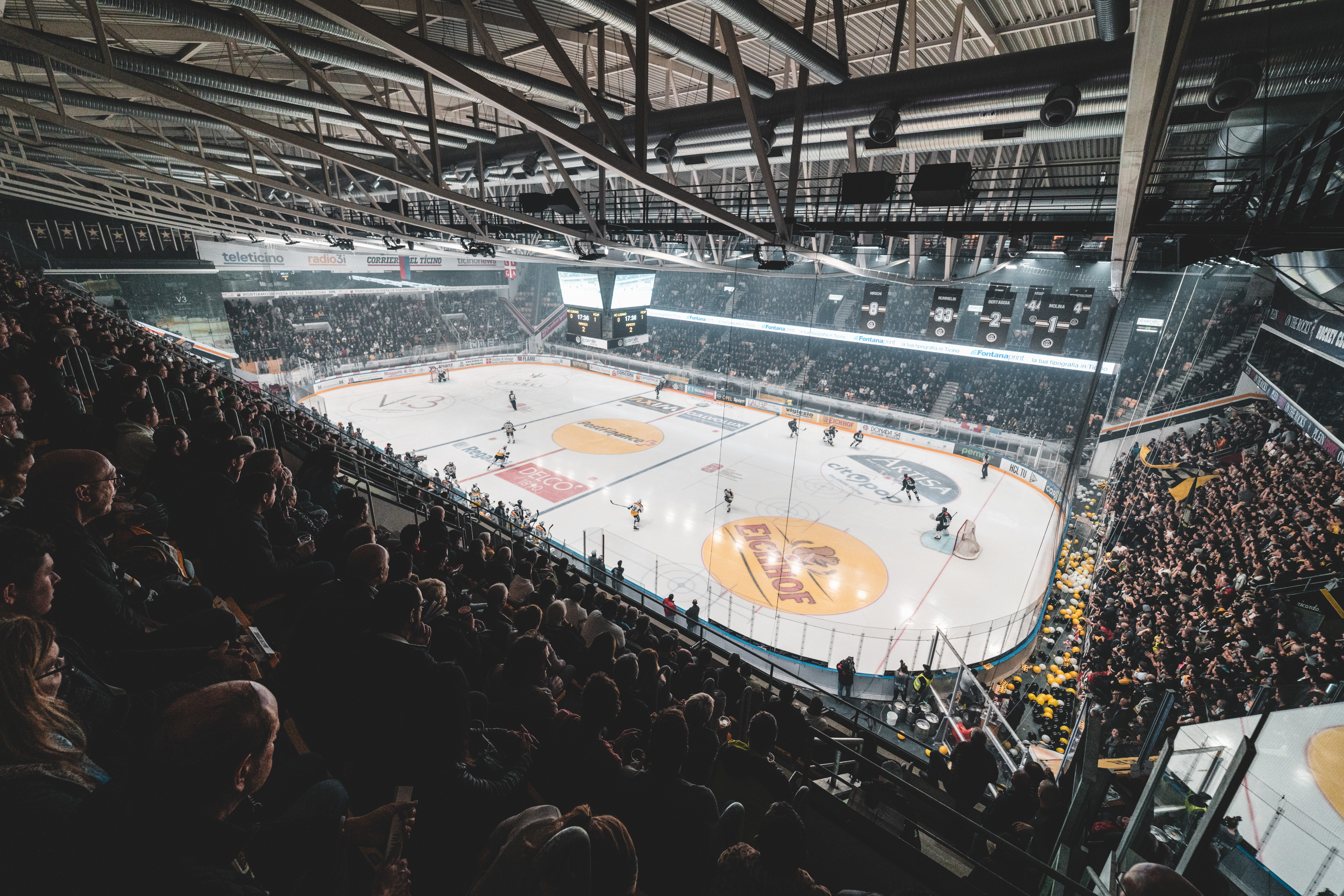
- Interactive map of Cornèr Arena
- Former names: Pista La Resega, Resega (1995–2018)
- Location: Porza, Switzerland
- Coordinates: 46.0263°N 8.96322°E
- Owner: City of Lugano
- Operator: City of Lugano
- Capacity: 7,800
- Surface: 3'600 m2

Construction
- Opened: 1957
- Renovated: 1995

Tenant
- HC Lugano (NL) (1957-present)

Website
- www.cornerarena.ch

Cornèr Arena is an arena in Porza, Switzerland, near the city of Lugano. It is used primarily for ice hockey and is the home arena of Hockey Club Lugano and HC Porza.

== Facilities ==
The arena has a capacity of 7,200 people, 4,700 seated and the rest in three standing areas (the Curva Nord and Curva San Salvatore, and the Curva Ospiti for visiting fans). The arena has two ice rinks, the main one and a practice rink, as well as a conference room, a restaurant, and a buvette.

The arena was completely rebuild in 1995.

== See also ==
- List of indoor arenas in Switzerland
