= Shannon Sigrist =

Swiss ice hockey player (born 1999)

- Born: 20 April 1999 (age 27) Uzwil
- Weight: 67 kg (148 lb; 10 st 8 lb)
- Position: Defence
- Shoots: Right
- SWHL team Former teams: ZSC Lions; SC Weinfelden; Linköping HC
- National team: Switzerland
- Playing career: 2012–present
Medal record
Olympic Games
Bronze medal – third place	2026 Milano Cortina	Team

Shannon Sigrist (born 20 April 1999) is a Swiss ice hockey player and member of the Swiss national ice hockey team, currently playing with ZSC Lions in the Swiss Women's Hockey League.

== Career ==
From 2020 to 2022, she was playing with Linköping HC Dam of the Swedish Women's Hockey League (SDHL). She represented Switzerland in the women's ice hockey tournament at the 2018 and 2022 Winter Olympics and at the IIHF Women's World Championship in 2015, 2016, 2017, 2019, 2021, 2022, 2023, and 2025. Shannon won three Swiss Championship Titles (2015/16, 2016/17, 2023/24) in the Swiss Women's League playing for the ZSC Lions Frauen.

Her twin brother Justin Sigrist is a hockey player too.
