= SC Reinach =

Ice hockey club in Reinach, Aargau, Switzerland

SC Reinach Damen
- City: Reinach, Aargau, Switzerland
- League: Women's League
- Founded: 1989
- Home arena: Kunsteisbahn Oberwynental
- Colours: Purple, black
- Head coach: Sean Huber
- Website: screinach.ch

Franchise history
- 1989–1997: SC Reinach Albatros
- 1997–: SC Reinach

Championships
- Swiss Championship: 3 (2000–01, 2001–02, 2002–03)

Schlittschuhclub Reinach or SC Reinach, nicknamed 'The Lions', is a Swiss ice hockey club in the Women's League, previously known as the SWHL A and LKA/LNA. The team was founded in 1989 and gained promotion to the top flight of women's ice hockey in Switzerland in the late 1990s. They play in Reinach, Canton of Aargau at Kunsteisbahn Oberwynental.

The club also has a men's team in the 3. Liga and an active youth section.

== History ==
In 1997, the club shortened their name from SC Reinach Albatros to SC Reinach.

The club won the Swiss Championship three years in row from 2001 to 2003. From 2013 to 2017, the club struggled, being forced to compete in the relegation playoffs three times in four years. In 2018, the club signed a development agreement with second-tier club SC Langenthal.

The team was bolstered by several major signings for the 2017–18 season, including Julia Marty, Rahel Enzler, and Darcia Leimgruber, and the team markedly improved, finishing fourth in the league for the regular season. After further adding Evelina Raselli and Noemi Ryhner ahead of the 2018–19 season, SC Reinach ranked second in the regular season.

== Notable alumna ==
- Florence Schelling, 2013–2015
- Mariko Dale, 2010–2013 & 2016–2019
- Daniela Diaz, 2001–02
- Rahel Enzler, 2017–2020
- Evelina Raselli, 2018–2020
- Noemi Ryhner, 2017–2020
- Lara Stalder, 2009–2012
- Riitta Schäublin, 2000–01
- Anja Stiefel, 2009–2013

=== International players ===
- (Austria) Denise Altmann, 2005–06
- (Canada) Dana Antal, 1997–98
- (Slovakia) Petra Daňková, 2013–14
- (Norway) Ingvild Farstad, 2014–15
- (Czech Republic) Kateřina Flachsová, 2015–16
- (Finland) Sanna Lankosaari, 2003–04
- (Slovakia) Michaela Matejová, 2009–10
- (Slovakia) Petra Pravlíková, 2013–14
- (Germany) Sara Seiler, 2005–06
- (Czech Republic) Simona Studentová, 2015–16
- (United Kingdom) Angela Taylor, 2010–11
- (Slovakia) Martina Veličková, 2013–14
