= Switzerland at the 2022 Winter Olympics =

- Flag of Switzerland
- IOC code: SUI
- NOC: Swiss Olympic Association
- Website: www.swissolympic.ch (in German and French)

in Beijing, China 4–20 February 2022
- Competitors: 167 (92 men and 75 women) in 13 sports
- Flag bearers (opening): Andres Ambühl; Wendy Holdener
- Flag bearer (closing): Ryan Regez
- Medals Ranked 8th: Gold 7 Silver 2 Bronze 6 Total 15

Winter Olympics appearances (overview)
- 1924; 1928; 1932; 1936; 1948; 1952; 1956; 1960; 1964; 1968; 1972; 1976; 1980; 1984; 1988; 1992; 1994; 1998; 2002; 2006; 2010; 2014; 2018; 2022; 2026

Switzerland competed at the 2022 Winter Olympics in Beijing, China, from 4 to 20 February 2022.

Alpine skier Wendy Holdener and hockey player Andres Ambühl were selected as the Swiss flagbearers during the opening ceremony Meanwhile, freestyle skier Ryan Regez was the flagbearer during the closing ceremony.

== Competitors ==
The following is the list of number of competitors participating at the Games per sport/discipline.

Sport	Men	Women	Total
Alpine skiing	11	11	22
Biathlon	4	4	8
Bobsleigh	8	4	12
Cross-country skiing	8	6	14
Curling	6	6	12
Figure skating	1	1	2
Freestyle skiing	14	8	22
Ice hockey	25	23	48
Luge	0	1	1
Ski jumping	4	0	4
Skeleton	1	0	1
Speed skating	1	1	2
Snowboarding	9	10	19
Total	92	75	167

== Medalists ==
The following Swiss competitors won medals at the games. In the discipline sections below, the medalists' names are bolded.

Medals by date
**Day**	**Date**	1st place, gold medalist(s)	2nd place, silver medalist(s)	3rd place, bronze medalist(s)	Total
Day 1	5 February	0	0	0	0
Day 2	6 February	0	0	0	0
Day 3	7 February	1	0	1	2
Day 4	8 February	0	0	1	1
Day 5	9 February	0	0	1	1
Day 6	10 February	0	0	0	0
Day 7	11 February	1	0	2	3
Day 8	12 February	0	0	0	0
Day 9	13 February	1	0	0	1
Day 10	14 February	0	0	0	0
Day 11	15 February	2	0	0	2
Day 12	16 February	0	0	0	0
Day 13	17 February	1	1	1	2
Day 14	18 February	1	1	0	2
Day 15	19 February	0	0	0	0
Day 16	20 February	0	0	0	0
Total		7	2	6	15

Medal	Name	Sport	Event	Date
Gold	Beat Feuz	Alpine skiing	Men's downhill	7 February
Gold	Lara Gut-Behrami	Alpine skiing	Women's super-G	11 February
Gold	Marco Odermatt	Alpine skiing	Men's giant slalom	13 February
Gold	Mathilde Gremaud	Freestyle skiing	Women's slopestyle	15 February
Gold	Corinne Suter	Alpine skiing	Women's downhill	15 February
Gold	Michelle Gisin	Alpine skiing	Women's combined	17 February
Gold	Ryan Regez	Freestyle skiing	Men's ski cross	18 February
Silver	Wendy Holdener	Alpine skiing	Women's combined	17 February
Silver	Alex Fiva	Freestyle skiing	Men's ski cross	18 February
Bronze	Lara Gut-Behrami	Alpine skiing	Women's giant slalom	7 February
Bronze	Mathilde Gremaud	Freestyle Skiing	Big air	8 February
Bronze	Wendy Holdener	Alpine skiing	Women's slalom	9 February
Bronze	Jan Scherrer	Snowboarding	Halfpipe	11 February
Bronze	Michelle Gisin	Alpine skiing	Women's super-G	11 February
Bronze	Fanny Smith	Freestyle skiing	Women's ski cross	17 February – 13 December

== Alpine skiing ==
Switzerland qualified the maximum eleven male and eleven female alpine skiers.

Men

Athlete	Event	Run 1		Run 2		Total	
Athlete	Event	Time	Rank	Time	Rank	Time	Rank
Luca Aerni	Combined	1:47.03	20	DNF			
Yannick Chabloz	Combined	DNF		Did not advance			
Loïc Meillard	Combined	1:45.91	17	DNF			
Justin Murisier	Combined	1:44.14	6	48.15	3	2:32.29	4
Beat Feuz	Downhill	—N/a				1:42.69	1st place, gold medalist(s)
Niels Hintermann	Downhill	—N/a				1:44.08	16
Marco Odermatt	Downhill	—N/a				1:43:40	7
Stefan Rogentin	Downhill	—N/a				1:44:95	25
Gino Caviezel	Giant slalom	1:03.90	10	1:07.30	6	2:11.20	7
Loïc Meillard	Giant slalom	DNF		Did not advance			
Justin Murisier	Giant slalom	DNF		Did not advance			
Marco Odermatt	Giant slalom	1:02.93	1	1:06.42	2	2:09.35	1st place, gold medalist(s)
Luca Aerni	Slalom	55.63	19	50.20	3	1:45.83	14
Loïc Meillard	Slalom	54.22	4	50.67	10	1:44.89	5
Daniel Yule	Slalom	55.06	13	49.89	2	1:44.95	6
Ramon Zenhäusern	Slalom	54.72	11	50.75	11	1:45.47	12
Gino Caviezel	Super-G	—N/a				1:21.76	16
Beat Feuz	Super-G	—N/a				DNF	
Marco Odermatt	Super-G	—N/a				DNF	
Stefan Rogentin	Super-G	—N/a				1:21.57	14

Women

Athlete	Event	Run 1		Run 2		Total	
Athlete	Event	Time	Rank	Time	Rank	Time	Rank
Michelle Gisin	Combined	1:33.42	12	52.25	1	2:25.67	1st place, gold medalist(s)
Wendy Holdener	Combined	1:33.41	11	53.31	3	2:26.72	2nd place, silver medalist(s)
Priska Nufer	Combined	1:33.15	10	DNF			
Jasmine Flury	Downhill	—N/a				1:34.00	15
Lara Gut-Behrami	Downhill	—N/a				1:34.03	16
Joana Hählen	Downhill	—N/a				1:33.16	6
Corinne Suter	Downhill	—N/a				1:31.87	1st place, gold medalist(s)
Michelle Gisin	Giant slalom	59.19	9	58.36	9	1:57.55	10
Lara Gut-Behrami	Giant slalom	59.07	8	57.34	1	1:56.41	3rd place, bronze medalist(s)
Wendy Holdener	Giant slalom	59.21	10	58.11	7	1:57.32	9
Camille Rast	Giant slalom	59.29	12	59.14	20	1:58.43	16
Aline Danioth	Slalom	53.66	13	52.98	8	1:46.64	10
Michelle Gisin	Slalom	52.20	2	53.38	18	1:45.58	6
Wendy Holdener	Slalom	52.65	5	52.45	4	1:45.10	3rd place, bronze medalist(s)
Camille Rast	Slalom	53.35	9	52.40	3	1:45.75	7
Jasmine Flury	Super-G	—N/a				1:14.43	12
Michelle Gisin	Super-G	—N/a				1:13.81	3rd place, bronze medalist(s)
Lara Gut-Behrami	Super-G	—N/a				1:13.51	1st place, gold medalist(s)
Corinne Suter	Super-G	—N/a				1:14.49	13

Mixed

Athlete	Event	Round of 16	Quarterfinal	Semifinal	Final / BM	
Athlete	Event	Opposition Result	Opposition Result	Opposition Result	Opposition Result	Rank
Andrea Ellenberger; Wendy Holdener; Camille Rast; Gino Caviezel; Justin Murisier	Team	China; W 4–0	Germany; L 2–2*	Did not advance		6

== Biathlon ==
Men

Athlete	Event	Time	Misses	Rank
Joscha Burkhalter	Individual	52:12.4	2 (0+2+0+0)	22
Niklas Hartweg	Individual	55:19.7	4 (0+2+0+2)	56
Sebastian Stalder	Individual	55:12.6	3 (0+1+1+1)	53
Benjamin Weger	Individual	52:06.9	2 (0+0+1+1)	19
Joscha Burkhalter	Pursuit	LAP	9 (1+4+4+)	DNF
Niklas Hartweg	Pursuit	44:34.7	5 (1+3+0+1)	38
Sebastian Stalder	Pursuit	44:10.7	4 (1+0+2+1)	27
Benjamin Weger	Pursuit	DNS		
Joscha Burkhalter	Sprint	26:28.3	2 (1+1)	45
Niklas Hartweg	Sprint	26:05.7	2 (1+1)	37
Sebastian Stalder	Sprint	25:48.3	0 (0+0)	27
Benjamin Weger	Sprint	26:39.6	1 (0+1)	53
Sebastian Stalder; Benjamin Weger; Niklas Hartweg; Joscha Burkhalter	Team relay	1:24:12.3	1+8	12

Women

Athlete	Event	Time	Misses	Rank
Amy Baserga	Individual	52:25.1	5 (2+2+1+0)	69
Selina Gasparin	Individual	51:43.8	7 (1+2+2+2)	62
Lena Häcki	Individual	48:03.3	4 (0+2+1+1)	24
Lena Häcki	Mass start	43:14.2	9 (0+3+3+3)	16
Amy Baserga	Pursuit	40:18.0	3 (1+0+1+1)	39
Lena Häcki	Pursuit	38:27.5	4 (2+0+1+1)	24
Amy Baserga	Sprint	23:24.2	2 (2+0)	54
Lena Häcki	Sprint	22:30.3	2 (1+1)	23
Amy Baserga; Irene Cadurisch; Selina Gasparin; Lena Häcki	Team relay	DNF		-

Mixed

Athlete	Event	Time	Misses	Rank
Amy Baserga; Lena Häcki; Sebastian Stalder; Benjamin Weger	Relay	1:09:06.0	2+11	8

== Bobsleigh ==
Athlete	Event	Run 1		Run 2		Run 3		Run 4		Total	
Athlete	Event	Time	Rank	Time	Rank	Time	Rank	Time	Rank	Time	Rank
Simon Friedli; Andreas Haas	Two-man	59.97	17	1:00.37	20	1:00.47	23	1:00.34	17	4:01.15	18
Michael Vogt; Sandro Michel	Two-man	59.57	7	59.90	3	59.59	5	59.77	4	3:58.83	4
Michael Vogt; Luca Rolli; Cyril Bieri; Sandro Michel	Four-man	59.23	13	59.22	7	59.18	12	59.44	9	3:57.07	11
Simon Friedli; Adrian Fassler; Fabio Badraun; Andreas Haas	Four-man	59.71	23	1:00.01	23	59.57	20	Did not advance		2:59.29	24
Melanie Hasler	Monobob	1:05.18	6	1:05.86	11	1:06.21	13	1:05.56	6	4:22.81	7
Martina Fontanive; Irina Strebel	Two-woman	1:02.48	20	1:02.35	18	1:02.35	19	1:02.41	17	4:09.59	20
Melanie Hasler; Nadja Pasternack	Two-woman	1:01.65	7	1:01.85	6	1:01.77	7	1:01.56	3	4:06.83	6

== Cross-country skiing ==
Switzerland qualified eight male and six female cross-country skiers.

Distance
Men

Athlete	Event	Classical		Freestyle		Final		
Athlete	Event	Time	Rank	Time	Rank	Time	Deficit	Rank
Jonas Baumann	15 km classical	—N/a				40:09.7	+2:14.9	16
Dario Cologna	15 km classical	—N/a				41:39.9	+3:45.1	44
Jason Rüesch	15 km classical	—N/a				42:29.8	+4:35.0	53
Jonas Baumann	30 km skiathlon	41:05.0	14	38:56.6	17	1:20:32.5	+4:22.7	15
Candide Pralong	30 km skiathlon	41:38.6	28	39:03.5	20	1:21:13.6	+5:03.8	22
Jason Rüesch	30 km skiathlon	41:40.6	31	40:27.5	27	1:22:41.3	+6:31.5	27
Dario Cologna	50 km freestyle	—N/a				1:13:31.1	+1:58.4	14
Roman Furger	50 km freestyle	—N/a				1:13:24.8	+1:52.1	11
Candide Pralong	50 km freestyle	—N/a				1:14:50.5	+3:17.8	22
Jason Rüesch	50 km freestyle	—N/a				1:14:48.4	+3:15.7	17
Dario Cologna; Jonas Baumann; Candide Pralong; Roman Furger	4 × 10 km relay	—N/a				2:00:13.3	+5:22.6	7

Women

Athlete	Event	Classical		Freestyle		Final		
Athlete	Event	Time	Rank	Time	Rank	Time	Deficit	Rank
Nadine Fähndrich	10 km classical	—N/a				30:23.8	+2:17.5	22
Nadja Kälin	10 km classical	—N/a				31:29.7	+3:23.4	43
Anja Weber	10 km classical	—N/a				32:13.4	+4:07.1	55
Lydia Hiernickel	15 km skiathlon	25:06.6	41	23:15.5	24	48:59.0	+4:45.3	32
Nadja Kälin	15 km skiathlon	24:17.0	21	23:08.4	21	47:59.8	+3:46.1	21
Lydia Hiernickel	30 km freestyle	—N/a				1:32:12.3	+7:18.3	27
Laurien van der Graaff; Nadine Fähndrich; Nadja Kälin; Alina Meier	4 x 5 km relay	—N/a				56:41.5	+3:00.5	7

Sprint

Athlete	Event	Qualification		Quarterfinal		Semifinal		Final	
Athlete	Event	Time	Rank	Time	Rank	Time	Rank	Time	Rank
Valerio Grond	Men's individual	2:53.17	24 Q	2:54.12	4	Did not advance			18
Jovian Hediger	Men's individual	2:52.47	20 Q	2:58.87	5	Did not advance			22
Roman Schaad	Men's individual	2:54.57	31	Did not advance					
Jonas Baumann; Jovian Hediger	Men's team	—N/a				20:07.67	3 Q	20:04.35	8
Nadine Fähndrich	Women's individual	3:15.65	3 Q	3:16.51	1 Q	3:12.61	2 Q	3:16.89	5
Alina Meier	Women's individual	3:20.88	17 Q	3:21.12	3	Did not advance			13
Laurien van der Graaff	Women's individual	3:23.03	27	3:24.32	5	Did not advance			24
Anja Weber	Women's individual	3:31.60	49	Did not advance					
Nadine Fähndrich; Laurien van der Graaff	Women's team	—N/a				23:30.86	4 Q	23:02.09	7

== Curling ==
Summary

Team	Event	Group stage										Semifinal	Final / BM	
Team	Event	Opposition Score	Opposition Score	Opposition Score	Opposition Score	Opposition Score	Opposition Score	Opposition Score	Opposition Score	Opposition Score	Rank	Opposition Score	Opposition Score	Rank
Benoît Schwarz; Sven Michel; Peter de Cruz; Valentin Tanner; Pablo Lachat	Men's tournament	NOR; L 4–7	ROC; W 6–3	CAN; W 5–3	DEN; W 8–6	ITA; L 4–8	GBR; L 5–6	USA; L 4–7	CHN; L 5–6	SWE; W 10–8	7	Did not advance		
Alina Pätz; Silvana Tirinzoni; Esther Neuenschwander; Melanie Barbezat; Carole Howald	Women's tournament	GBR; W 6–5	CHN; W 7–5	ROC; W 8–7	DEN; W 8–5	CAN; W 8–4	SWE; L 5–6	USA; W 9–6	KOR; W 8–4	JPN; W 8–4	1 Q	JPN; L 6–8	SWE; L 7–9	4
Jenny Perret; Martin Rios	Mixed doubles tournament	CHN; L 6–7	ITA; L 7–8	GBR; W 8–7	CAN; L 5–7	SWE; L 1–6	CZE; W 11–3	AUS; L 6–9	USA; W 6–5	NOR; L 5–6	7	Did not advance		

=== Men's tournament ===
Switzerland has qualified their men's team (five athletes), by finishing in the top six teams in the 2021 World Men's Curling Championship. Team Peter de Cruz qualified as Swiss representatives by winning the 2021 Swiss Olympic Curling Trials, defeating Yannick Schwaller 4–0 in the best-of-seven event.

Final Round Robin Standings
Team	Skip	Pld	W	L	W–L	PF	PA	EW	EL	BE	SE	S%	DSC	Qualification
Great Britain	Bruce Mouat	9	8	1	–	63	44	39	31	5	10	88.0%	18.81	Playoffs
Sweden	Niklas Edin	9	7	2	–	64	44	43	30	10	11	85.7%	14.02	Playoffs
Canada	Brad Gushue	9	5	4	1–0	58	50	34	38	7	7	84.4%	26.49	Playoffs
United States	John Shuster	9	5	4	0–1	56	61	35	41	4	5	83.0%	32.29	Playoffs
China	Ma Xiuyue	9	4	5	2–1; 1–0	59	62	39	36	6	4	85.4%	23.55	
Norway	Steffen Walstad	9	4	5	2–1; 0–1	58	53	40	36	0	11	84.4%	20.96	
Switzerland	Peter de Cruz	9	4	5	1–2; 1–0	51	54	33	38	13	3	84.5%	15.74	
ROC	Sergey Glukhov	9	4	5	1–2; 0–1	58	58	33	38	6	6	81.2%	33.72	
Italy	Joël Retornaz	9	3	6	–	59	65	36	35	3	8	81.7%	30.76	
Denmark	Mikkel Krause	9	1	8	–	36	71	30	39	3	2	78.1%	32.84	

Round robin

Switzerland had a bye in draws 2, 6 and 10.

Draw 1

Wednesday, 9 February, 20:05

Sheet C	1	2	3	4	5	6	7	8	9	10	Final
Norway (Walstad)	0	1	1	0	1	1	0	0	2	1	7
Switzerland (de Cruz) 🔨	1	0	0	1	0	0	0	2	0	0	4

Draw 3

Friday, 11 February, 9:05

Sheet A	1	2	3	4	5	6	7	8	9	10	Final
Switzerland (de Cruz) 🔨	0	0	3	0	0	0	0	3	0	X	6
ROC (Glukhov)	0	0	0	2	1	0	0	0	0	X	3

Draw 4

Friday, 11 February, 20:05

Sheet D	1	2	3	4	5	6	7	8	9	10	Final
Canada (Gushue)	0	0	1	0	0	2	0	0	0	X	3
Switzerland (de Cruz) 🔨	1	1	0	0	1	0	0	1	1	X	5

Draw 5

Saturday, 12 February, 14:05

Sheet C	1	2	3	4	5	6	7	8	9	10	Final
Denmark (Krause)	0	1	0	2	0	1	0	0	2	0	6
Switzerland (de Cruz) 🔨	2	0	2	0	2	0	0	1	0	1	8

Draw 7

Sunday, 13 February, 20:05

Sheet B	1	2	3	4	5	6	7	8	9	10	Final
Switzerland (de Cruz) 🔨	1	0	1	0	2	0	0	0	0	X	4
Italy (Retornaz)	0	1	0	1	0	3	0	1	2	X	8

Draw 8

Monday, 14 February, 14:05

Sheet D	1	2	3	4	5	6	7	8	9	10	Final
Switzerland (de Cruz)	0	0	1	0	1	1	0	0	2	0	5
Great Britain (Mouat) 🔨	0	1	0	2	0	0	1	1	0	1	6

Draw 9

Tuesday, 15 February, 9:05

Sheet C	1	2	3	4	5	6	7	8	9	10	Final
Switzerland (de Cruz) 🔨	1	0	0	1	0	2	0	0	0	X	4
United States (Shuster)	0	2	0	0	1	0	2	1	1	X	7

Draw 11

Wednesday, 16 February, 14:05

Sheet A	1	2	3	4	5	6	7	8	9	10	Final
China (Ma)	0	0	1	0	2	0	0	1	0	2	6
Switzerland (de Cruz) 🔨	0	2	0	1	0	0	1	0	1	0	5

Draw 12

Thursday, 17 February, 9:05

Sheet B	1	2	3	4	5	6	7	8	9	10	Final
Sweden (Edin) 🔨	3	0	0	2	0	1	1	0	1	0	8
Switzerland (de Cruz)	0	0	2	0	3	0	0	2	0	3	10

=== Women's tournament ===
Switzerland has qualified their women's team (five athletes), by finishing in the top six teams in the 2021 World Women's Curling Championship. Team Silvana Tirinzoni qualified as Swiss representatives as they finished in the top six at the 2021 Women's Worlds and reached the playoffs at the 2019 European Curling Championships.

Final Round Robin Standings
Team	Skip	Pld	W	L	W–L	PF	PA	EW	EL	BE	SE	S%	DSC	Qualification
Switzerland	Silvana Tirinzoni	9	8	1	–	67	46	44	36	4	12	81.6%	19.14	Playoffs
Sweden	Anna Hasselborg	9	7	2	–	64	49	39	35	6	12	82.0%	25.02	Playoffs
Great Britain	Eve Muirhead	9	5	4	1–1	63	47	39	33	4	9	80.6%	35.27	Playoffs
Japan	Satsuki Fujisawa	9	5	4	1–1	64	62	40	36	2	13	82.3%	36.00	Playoffs
Canada	Jennifer Jones	9	5	4	1–1	71	59	42	41	1	14	80.4%	45.44	
United States	Tabitha Peterson	9	4	5	2–0	60	64	40	39	2	12	79.5%	33.87	
China	Han Yu	9	4	5	1–1	56	67	38	41	3	10	79.6%	30.06	
South Korea	Kim Eun-jung	9	4	5	0–2	62	66	40	42	3	10	80.8%	27.79	
Denmark	Madeleine Dupont	9	2	7	–	50	68	33	41	7	0	77.2%	23.36	
ROC	Alina Kovaleva	9	1	8	–	50	79	34	45	2	7	78.9%	29.34	

Round robin

Switzerland had a bye in draws 4, 7 and 11.

Draw 1

Thursday, 10 February, 9:05

Sheet A	1	2	3	4	5	6	7	8	9	10	11	Final
Great Britain (Muirhead)	0	0	1	0	0	2	1	0	1	0	0	5
Switzerland (Tirinzoni) 🔨	0	1	0	1	0	0	0	2	0	1	1	6

Draw 2

Thursday, 10 February, 20:05

Sheet D	1	2	3	4	5	6	7	8	9	10	Final
China (Han) 🔨	0	1	0	1	0	1	0	2	0	0	5
Switzerland (Tirinzoni)	1	0	1	0	1	0	2	0	1	1	7

Draw 3

Friday, 11 February, 14:05

Sheet C	1	2	3	4	5	6	7	8	9	10	Final
Switzerland (Tirinzoni) 🔨	2	0	0	1	0	0	2	3	0	0	8
ROC (Kovaleva)	0	0	1	0	1	2	0	0	2	1	7

Draw 5

Saturday, 12 February, 20:05

Sheet B	1	2	3	4	5	6	7	8	9	10	Final
Denmark (Dupont)	0	0	1	0	0	0	3	0	1	0	5
Switzerland (Tirinzoni) 🔨	1	0	0	1	0	1	0	3	0	2	8

Draw 6

Sunday, 13 February, 14:05

Sheet D	1	2	3	4	5	6	7	8	9	10	Final
Switzerland (Tirinzoni) 🔨	1	1	0	1	0	0	1	2	2	X	8
Canada (Jones)	0	0	1	0	2	1	0	0	0	X	4

Draw 8

Monday, 14 February, 20:05

Sheet A	1	2	3	4	5	6	7	8	9	10	11	Final
Switzerland (Tirinzoni) 🔨	1	0	0	1	0	0	0	2	0	1	0	5
Sweden (Hasselborg)	0	0	1	0	1	1	1	0	1	0	1	6

Draw 9

Tuesday, 15 February, 14:05

Sheet C	1	2	3	4	5	6	7	8	9	10	Final
United States (Peterson) 🔨	1	0	1	1	0	1	0	2	0	0	6
Switzerland (Tirinzoni)	0	2	0	0	1	0	1	0	4	1	9

Draw 10

Wednesday, 16 February, 9:05

Sheet B	1	2	3	4	5	6	7	8	9	10	Final
Switzerland (Tirinzoni) 🔨	0	0	1	0	3	0	0	0	2	2	8
South Korea (Kim)	0	1	0	1	0	1	1	0	0	0	4

Draw 12

Thursday, 17 February, 14:05

Sheet A	1	2	3	4	5	6	7	8	9	10	Final
Japan (Fujisawa)	0	2	0	0	0	0	2	0	0	X	4
Switzerland (Tirinzoni) 🔨	1	0	1	1	2	0	0	0	3	X	8

Semifinal

Friday, 18 February, 20:05

Sheet C	1	2	3	4	5	6	7	8	9	10	Final
Switzerland (Tirinzoni) 🔨	0	1	0	1	0	0	3	0	1	0	6
Japan (Fujisawa)	0	0	1	0	4	1	0	1	0	1	8

Bronze medal game

Saturday, 19 February, 20:05

Sheet B	1	2	3	4	5	6	7	8	9	10	Final
Switzerland (Tirinzoni) 🔨	0	1	0	0	1	0	2	0	3	0	7
Sweden (Hasselborg)	1	0	0	2	0	3	0	2	0	1	9

=== Mixed doubles tournament ===
Switzerland has qualified their mixed doubles team (two athletes), by finishing in the top seven teams in the 2021 World Mixed Doubles Curling Championship. On 28 September 2021, the Swiss Olympic Association announced that Jenny Perret and Martin Rios would be their mixed doubles representatives.

Final Round Robin Standings
Team	Athletes	Pld	W	L	W–L	PF	PA	EW	EL	BE	SE	S%	DSC	Qualification
Italy	Stefania Constantini / Amos Mosaner	9	9	0	–	79	48	43	28	0	17	79%	25.34	Playoffs
Norway	Kristin Skaslien / Magnus Nedregotten	9	6	3	1–0	68	50	40	28	0	15	82%	24.48	Playoffs
Great Britain	Jennifer Dodds / Bruce Mouat	9	6	3	0–1	60	50	38	33	0	12	79%	22.48	Playoffs
Sweden	Almida de Val / Oskar Eriksson	9	5	4	1–0	55	54	35	33	0	10	76%	21.77	Playoffs
Canada	Rachel Homan / John Morris	9	5	4	0–1	57	54	33	39	0	8	78%	53.73	
Czech Republic	Zuzana Paulová / Tomáš Paul	9	4	5	–	50	65	29	39	1	7	75%	33.41	
Switzerland	Jenny Perret / Martin Rios	9	3	6	1–0	55	58	32	39	0	6	73%	39.04	
United States	Vicky Persinger / Chris Plys	9	3	6	0–1	50	67	34	36	0	9	74%	27.29	
China	Fan Suyuan / Ling Zhi	9	2	7	1–0	51	64	34	36	0	7	74%	17.81	
Australia	Tahli Gill / Dean Hewitt	9	2	7	0–1	52	67	31	38	1	8	72%	50.51	

Round robin

Switzerland had a bye in draws 2, 6, 8 and 10.

Draw 1

Wednesday, 2 February, 20:05

Sheet D	1	2	3	4	5	6	7	8	9	Final
China (Fan / Ling) 🔨	1	1	1	0	1	0	2	0	1	7
Switzerland (Perret / Rios)	0	0	0	2	0	3	0	1	0	6

Draw 3

Thursday, 3 February, 14:05

Sheet A	1	2	3	4	5	6	7	8	9	Final
Italy (Constantini / Mosaner)	0	3	0	1	1	0	2	0	1	8
Switzerland (Perret / Rios) 🔨	1	0	2	0	0	3	0	1	0	7

Draw 4

Thursday, 3 February, 20:05

Sheet B	1	2	3	4	5	6	7	8	Final
Switzerland (Perret / Rios)	0	3	0	3	0	1	0	1	8
Great Britain (Dodds / Mouat) 🔨	1	0	2	0	1	0	3	0	7

Draw 5

Friday, 4 February, 8:35

Sheet C	1	2	3	4	5	6	7	8	Final
Canada (Homan / Morris)	3	0	1	0	2	0	1	0	7
Switzerland (Perret / Rios) 🔨	0	1	0	1	0	2	0	1	5

Draw 7

Saturday, 5 February, 9:05

Sheet D	1	2	3	4	5	6	7	8	Final
Switzerland (Perret / Rios)	0	1	0	0	0	0	X	X	1
Sweden (de Val / Eriksson) 🔨	2	0	1	1	1	1	X	X	6

Draw 9

Saturday, 5 February, 20:05

Sheet C	1	2	3	4	5	6	7	8	Final
Czech Republic (Paulová / Paul)	0	0	0	0	0	3	0	X	3
Switzerland (Perret / Rios) 🔨	3	1	3	2	1	0	1	X	11

Draw 11

Sunday, 6 February, 14:05

Sheet B	1	2	3	4	5	6	7	8	Final
Australia (Gill / Hewitt) 🔨	2	1	0	0	0	3	2	1	9
Switzerland (Perret / Rios)	0	0	1	3	2	0	0	0	6

Draw 12

Sunday, 6 February, 20:05

Sheet C	1	2	3	4	5	6	7	8	Final
Switzerland (Perret / Rios) 🔨	3	0	0	1	0	1	0	1	6
United States (Persinger / Plys)	0	1	1	0	1	0	2	0	5

Draw 13

Monday, 7 February, 9:05

Sheet A	1	2	3	4	5	6	7	8	Final
Switzerland (Perret / Rios) 🔨	0	0	1	0	2	0	2	0	5
Norway (Skaslien / Nedregotten)	1	1	0	1	0	2	0	1	6

== Figure skating ==
In the 2021 World Figure Skating Championships in Stockholm, Sweden, Switzerland secured one quota in the men's competition.

Athlete	Event	SP		FS		Total	
Athlete	Event	Points	Rank	Points	Rank	Points	Rank
Lukas Britschgi	Men's singles	76.16	24 Q	136.42	23	212.58	23
Alexia Paganini	Women's singles	61.06	19 Q	107.85	22	168.91	22

== Freestyle skiing ==
Aerials

Athlete	Event	Qualification				Final			Rank
Athlete	Event	Jump 1		Jump 2		Jump 1		Jump 2	Rank
Athlete	Event	Points	Rank	Points	Rank	Points	Rank	Points	Rank
Nicolas Gygax	Men's	101.77	20	103.62	18	Did not advance			24
Noé Roth	Men's	123.08	3 Q	—N/a		122.13	8	Did not advance	8
Pirmin Werner	Men's	112.22	14	123.45	2 Q	126.24	4 Q	111.50	4
Alexandra Bär	Women's	67.72	21	67.72	17	Did not advance			23
Alexandra Bär; Pirmin Werner; Noé Roth	Mixed team	—N/a				300.62	4	276.01	4

Freeski

Athlete	Event	Qualification					Final				
Athlete	Event	Run 1	Run 2	Run 3	Best	Rank	Run 1	Run 2	Run 3	Best	Rank
Fabian Bösch	Men's big air	81.00	80.75	~~22.50~~	161.75	17	Did not advance				
Kim Gubser	Men's big air	~~15.25~~	79.75	41.50	121.25	22	Did not advance				
Andri Ragettli	Men's big air	89.75	78.00	~~20.75~~	167.75	14	Did not advance				
Colin Wili	Men's big air	77.50	~~18.75~~	20.75	98.25	25	Did not advance				
Robin Briguet	Men's halfpipe	72.25	~~3.00~~	—N/a	72.25	11 Q	21.75	~~6.75~~	~~3.00~~	21.75	12
Kim Gubser	Men's halfpipe	60.50	~~4.00~~	—N/a	60.50	15	Did not advance				
Fabian Bösch	Men's slopestyle	~~53.83~~	74.53	—N/a	74.53	10 Q	78.05	51.46	13.98	78.05	6
Kim Gubser	Men's slopestyle	76.71	~~DNS~~	—N/a	76.71	8 Q	DNS				
Andri Ragettli	Men's slopestyle	~~76.98~~	85.08	—N/a	85.08	1 Q	78.20	83.50	33.95	83.50	4
Colin Wili	Men's slopestyle	54.45	~~38.03~~	—N/a	54.45	19	Did not advance				
Mathilde Gremaud	Women's big air	60.00	54.75	~~9.00~~	114.75	6 Q	89.25	93.25	~~26.00~~	182.50	3rd place, bronze medalist(s)
Sarah Höfflin	Women's big air	85.50	~~42.75~~	64.00	149.50	9 Q	82.50	~~53.00~~	76.25	158.75	6
Mathilde Gremaud	Women's slopestyle	39.41	63.46	—N/a	63.46	12 Q	1.10	86.56	46.96	86.56	1st place, gold medalist(s)
Sarah Höfflin	Women's slopestyle	35.38	48.96	—N/a	48.96	20	Did not advance				

Moguls

Athlete	Event	Qualification								Final											
Athlete	Event	Run 1				Run 2				Run 1				Run 2				Run 3			
Athlete	Event	Time	Points	Total	Rank	Time	Points	Total	Rank	Time	Points	Total	Rank	Time	Points	Total	Rank	Time	Points	Total	Rank
Marco Tadé	Men's	25.03	59.49	74.48	15	25.23	55.72	70.45	10 Q	24.48	58.99	74.71	18	Did not advance							

Ski cross

Athlete	Event	Seeding		Round of 16	Quarterfinal	Semifinal	Final	
Athlete	Event	Time	Rank	Position	Position	Position	Position	Rank
Joos Berry	Men's	1:13.43	21	2 Q	4	Did not advance		16
Romain Detraz	Men's	1:13.69	27	3	Did not advance			24
Alex Fiva	Men's	1:11.94	1	1 Q	1 Q	1 BF	2	2nd place, silver medalist(s)
Ryan Regez	Men's	1:12.44	7	1 Q	1 Q	2 BF	1	1st place, gold medalist(s)
Talina Gantenbein	Women's	1:18.31	9	2 Q	3	Did not advance		9
Saskja Lack	Women's	1:19.21	13	3	Did not advance			18
Fanny Smith	Women's	1:17.06	2	1 'Q	1 Q	2 BF	3	(bronze) ^{[note]}

- ^{note}
Fanny Smith of Switzerland, the 2018 bronze medalist, initially crossed the line in third place and thought she had won the bronze medal. Daniela Maier of Germany finished fourth. However, following a 10-minute review by race judges, Smith was penalised for a clash with Maier, so at the awards ceremony on 17 February 2022 Maier was awarded the bronze.

On 26 February 2022, after the end of the Olympic Games, following an appeal from Fanny Smith, the FIS Appeals Commission made the decision to overturn the FIS Jury decision. As a result of winning the appeal, Smith was promoted to third place, while Maier officially finished in fourth place, which was reflected on the FIS website.

FIS has no right to make a decision on the return and redistribution of medals, as this issue is in the exclusive competence of the IOC, therefore, in its decision, the FIS Appeals Commission did not mention any words about the medals and their redistribution, and the IOC has the last word in this issue. On 13 December 2022, the Court of Arbitration for Sport decided both competitors will be awarded duplicate bronze medals and share joint third place. The IOC has updated the data on its website to reflect the changed podium. On the 18th of April 2023 she was awarded her bronze medal at a ceremony in the Olympic Museum.

== Ice hockey ==
Summary

Key:

- OT – Overtime
- GWS – Match decided by penalty-shootout

Team	Event	Group stage					Qualification playoff	Quarterfinal	Semifinal	Final / BM	
Team	Event	Opposition Score	Opposition Score	Opposition Score	Opposition Score	Rank	Opposition Score	Opposition Score	Opposition Score	Opposition Score	Rank
Switzerland men's	Men's tournament	ROC; L 0–1	Czech Republic; L 1–2 GWS	Denmark; L 3–5	—N/a	4	Czech Republic; W 4–2	Finland; L 1–5	Did not advance		8
Switzerland women's	Women's tournament	Canada; L 1–12	ROC; L 2–5	United States; L 0–8	Finland; W 3–2	5	—N/a	ROC; W 4–2	Canada; L 3–10	Finland; L 0–4	4

Switzerland has qualified 25 male competitors, and 23 female competitors to the ice hockey tournaments.

=== Men's tournament ===
Switzerland men's national ice hockey team qualified by being ranked 8th in the 2019 IIHF World Rankings.

Team roster

The roster was announced on 18 January 2022.

Head coach: Patrick Fischer

No.	Pos.	Name	Height	Weight	Birthdate	Team
2	D	Santeri Alatalo	1.80 m (5 ft 11 in)	80 kg (180 lb)	9 May 1990 (aged 31)	(Switzerland) HC Lugano
6	D	Yannick Weber	1.81 m (5 ft 11 in)	91 kg (201 lb)	23 September 1988 (aged 33)	(Switzerland) ZSC Lions
10	F	Andres Ambühl	1.76 m (5 ft 9 in)	86 kg (190 lb)	14 September 1983 (aged 38)	(Switzerland) HC Davos
11	F	Sven Senteler	1.85 m (6 ft 1 in)	90 kg (200 lb)	11 August 1992 (aged 29)	(Switzerland) EV Zug
15	F	Grégory Hofmann	1.82 m (6 ft 0 in)	91 kg (201 lb)	13 November 1992 (aged 29)	(Switzerland) EV Zug
16	D	Raphael Diaz (C)	1.81 m (5 ft 11 in)	89 kg (196 lb)	9 January 1986 (aged 36)	(Switzerland) HC Fribourg-Gottéron
20	G	Reto Berra	1.94 m (6 ft 4 in)	99 kg (218 lb)	3 January 1987 (aged 35)	(Switzerland) HC Fribourg-Gottéron
25	D	Mirco Müller	1.91 m (6 ft 3 in)	95 kg (209 lb)	21 March 1995 (aged 26)	(Switzerland) HC Lugano
36	G	Joren van Pottelberghe	1.91 m (6 ft 3 in)	85 kg (187 lb)	5 June 1997 (aged 24)	(Switzerland) EHC Biel
45	D	Michael Fora	1.92 m (6 ft 4 in)	98 kg (216 lb)	30 October 1995 (aged 26)	(Switzerland) HC Ambrì-Piotta
54	D	Christian Marti	1.91 m (6 ft 3 in)	97 kg (214 lb)	29 March 1993 (aged 28)	(Switzerland) ZSC Lions
55	D	Romain Loeffel	1.78 m (5 ft 10 in)	85 kg (187 lb)	10 March 1991 (aged 30)	(Switzerland) HC Lugano
58	F	Dario Simion	1.90 m (6 ft 3 in)	87 kg (192 lb)	22 May 1994 (aged 27)	(Switzerland) EV Zug
61	F	Fabrice Herzog	1.89 m (6 ft 2 in)	89 kg (196 lb)	9 December 1994 (aged 27)	(Switzerland) EV Zug
62	F	Denis Malgin	1.75 m (5 ft 9 in)	80 kg (180 lb)	18 January 1997 (aged 25)	(Switzerland) ZSC Lions
63	G	Leonardo Genoni	1.82 m (6 ft 0 in)	87 kg (192 lb)	28 August 1987 (aged 34)	(Switzerland) EV Zug
65	D	Ramon Untersander (A)	1.84 m (6 ft 0 in)	87 kg (192 lb)	21 January 1991 (aged 31)	(Switzerland) SC Bern
70	F	Denis Hollenstein	1.83 m (6 ft 0 in)	88 kg (194 lb)	15 October 1989 (aged 32)	(Switzerland) ZSC Lions
71	F	Enzo Corvi	1.83 m (6 ft 0 in)	86 kg (190 lb)	23 December 1992 (aged 29)	(Switzerland) HC Davos
82	F	Simon Moser (A)	1.87 m (6 ft 2 in)	97 kg (214 lb)	10 March 1989 (aged 32)	(Switzerland) SC Bern
83	F	Joël Vermin	1.80 m (5 ft 11 in)	87 kg (192 lb)	5 February 1992 (aged 30)	(Switzerland) Genève-Servette HC
85	F	Sven Andrighetto	1.78 m (5 ft 10 in)	85 kg (187 lb)	21 March 1993 (aged 28)	(Switzerland) ZSC Lions
87	F	Killian Mottet	1.77 m (5 ft 10 in)	76 kg (168 lb)	15 January 1991 (aged 31)	(Switzerland) HC Fribourg-Gottéron
88	F	Christoph Bertschy	1.78 m (5 ft 10 in)	84 kg (185 lb)	5 April 1994 (aged 27)	(Switzerland) Lausanne HC
92	F	Gaëtan Haas	1.83 m (6 ft 0 in)	82 kg (181 lb)	31 January 1992 (aged 30)	(Switzerland) EHC Biel

Group play

Pos	Team	Pld	W	OTW	OTL	L	GF	GA	GD	Pts	Qualification
1	ROC	3	2	0	1	0	8	6	+2	7	Quarterfinals
2	Denmark	3	2	0	0	1	7	6	+1	6	Playoffs
3	Czech Republic	3	0	2	0	1	9	8	+1	4	Playoffs
4	Switzerland	3	0	0	1	2	4	8	−4	1	Playoffs

Source: IIHF

February 9, 2022; 16:40 v	ROC	1–0 (1–0, 0–0, 0–0)	Switzerland	Beijing National Indoor Stadium, Beijing; Attendance: 934

Game reference
Ivan Fedotov	Goalies	Reto Berra	Referees: (Germany) André Schrader (Belarus) Maxim Sidorenko; Linesmen: (United States) Brian Oliver (Czech Republic) Jiří Ondráček
Slepyshev (Semyonov) – 19:57 / 1–0			Referees: (Germany) André Schrader (Belarus) Maxim Sidorenko; Linesmen: (United States) Brian Oliver (Czech Republic) Jiří Ondráček
14 min	Penalties	10 min	Referees: (Germany) André Schrader (Belarus) Maxim Sidorenko; Linesmen: (United States) Brian Oliver (Czech Republic) Jiří Ondráček
30	Shots	33	Referees: (Germany) André Schrader (Belarus) Maxim Sidorenko; Linesmen: (United States) Brian Oliver (Czech Republic) Jiří Ondráček

February 11, 2022; 16:40 v	Czech Republic	2–1 GWS (1–1, 0–0, 0–0) (OT: 0–0) (SO: 1–0)	Switzerland	Beijing National Indoor Stadium, Beijing; Attendance: 834

Game reference
Šimon Hrubec	Goalies	Leonardo Genoni	Referees: (Latvia) Andris Ansons (United States) Andrew Bruggeman; Linesmen: (Russia) Gleb Lazarev (Canada) Dustin McCrank
Smejkal (Klok, Zohorna) – 04:33 / 1–0; / 1–1 / 08:34 – Haas (Andrighetto) (PP)			Referees: (Latvia) Andris Ansons (United States) Andrew Bruggeman; Linesmen: (Russia) Gleb Lazarev (Canada) Dustin McCrank
Krejčí; Sedlák (miss); Kovář (miss); Řepík (miss)	Shootout	(miss) Ambühl; (miss) Andrighetto; (miss) Corvi; (miss) Bertschy; (miss) Haas	Referees: (Latvia) Andris Ansons (United States) Andrew Bruggeman; Linesmen: (Russia) Gleb Lazarev (Canada) Dustin McCrank
10 min	Penalties	4 min	Referees: (Latvia) Andris Ansons (United States) Andrew Bruggeman; Linesmen: (Russia) Gleb Lazarev (Canada) Dustin McCrank
36	Shots	25	Referees: (Latvia) Andris Ansons (United States) Andrew Bruggeman; Linesmen: (Russia) Gleb Lazarev (Canada) Dustin McCrank

February 12, 2022; 21:10 v	Switzerland	3–5 (1–0, 0–3, 2–2)	Denmark	Wukesong Arena, Beijing; Attendance: 620

Game reference

Reto Berra
Goalies
Sebastian Dahm
Referees:
(Russia) Roman Gofman
(Finland) Kristian Vikman
Linesmen:
(Sweden) Andreas Malmqvist
(Russia) Nikita Shalagin

Corvi (Weber, Thürkauf) – 15:59	1–0
	1–1	20:46 – Regin (Storm, Nick. Jensen) (PP)
	1–2	21:07 – Storm (Nich. Jensen, Russell)
	1–3	33:12 – Bødker (Russell, Lauridsen)
	1–4	41:55 – Meyer (Nich. Jensen, Jakobsen)
Loeffel (Untersander, Corvi) (PP) – 44:53	2–4
Herzog (Corvi, Untersander) (EA) – 57:37	3–4
	3–5	59:01 – Storm (Russell) (ENG)

14 min
Penalties
6 min
31
Shots
30

Playoffs

February 15, 2022; 16:40 v	Czech Republic	2–4 (1–2, 0–1, 1–1)	Switzerland	Beijing National Indoor Stadium, Beijing; Attendance: 990

Game reference

Šimon Hrubec
Goalies
Leonardo Genoni
Referees:
(Russia) Roman Gofman
(Finland) Mikko Kaukokari
Linesmen:
(Sweden) Ludvig Lundgren
(Sweden) Andreas Malmqvist

Klok (Knot, Červenka) – 10:08	1–0
	1–1	14:59 – Ambühl (Thürkauf, Corvi) (PP)
	1–2	15:12 – Mottet (Hollenstein, Diaz)
	1–3	29:53 – Malgin (Alatalo, Andrighetto) (PP)
	1–4	54:57 – Diaz (Andrighetto, Herzog)
Červenka (Krejčí, Kovář) (PP, EA) – 55:59	2–4

6 min
Penalties
4 min
33
Shots
18

Quarterfinals

February 16, 2022; 16:40 v	Finland	5–1 (2–0, 1–1, 2–0)	Switzerland	Beijing National Indoor Stadium, Beijing; Attendance: 948

Game reference

Harri Säteri
Goalies
Reto Berra
Leonardo Genoni
Referees:
(Latvia) Andris Ansons
(Canada) Oliver Gouin
Linesmen:
(Czech Republic) Daniel Hynek
(United States) Brian Oliver

Aaltonen (Friman, Nättinen) – 08:37	1–0
Lehtonen (Hietanen, Manninen) – 10:45	2–0
Anttila (Björninen) – 23:08	3–0
	3–1	37:49 – Ambühl (Corvi, Haas) (PP)
Pakarinen (Filppula, Pesonen) (ENG) – 55:28	4–1
Hartikainen (ENG) – 56:47	5–1

4 min
Penalties
4 min
23
Shots
34

=== Women's tournament ===
Switzerland women's national ice hockey team qualified by being ranked 5th in the 2020 IIHF World Rankings.

Team roster

The roster was announced on 14 January 2022.

Head coach: Colin Muller

No.	Pos.	Name	Height	Weight	Birthdate	Team
3	D	Sarah Forster	1.68 m (5 ft 6 in)	66 kg (146 lb)	19 March 1993 (aged 28)	(Sweden) AIK IF
7	F	Lara Stalder	1.67 m (5 ft 6 in)	63 kg (139 lb)	15 May 1994 (aged 27)	(Sweden) Brynäs IF
8	F	Kaleigh Quennec	1.72 m (5 ft 8 in)	80 kg (180 lb)	15 February 1998 (aged 23)	(Canada) Montreal Carabins
9	D	Shannon Sigrist	1.67 m (5 ft 6 in)	68 kg (150 lb)	20 April 1999 (aged 22)	(Sweden) Linköping HC
12	F	Lisa Rüedi	1.67 m (5 ft 6 in)	67 kg (148 lb)	3 November 2000 (aged 21)	(Switzerland) ZSC Lions
14	F	Evelina Raselli	1.70 m (5 ft 7 in)	61 kg (134 lb)	3 May 1992 (aged 29)	(United States) Boston Pride
15	F	Laura Zimmermann	1.63 m (5 ft 4 in)	69 kg (152 lb)	5 April 2003 (aged 18)	(Switzerland) EV Bomo Thun
16	D	Nicole Vallario	1.66 m (5 ft 5 in)	66 kg (146 lb)	30 August 2001 (aged 20)	(United States) St. Thomas Tommies
17	D	Lara Christen	1.63 m (5 ft 4 in)	64 kg (141 lb)	2 October 2002 (aged 19)	(Switzerland) ZSC Lions
18	D	Stefanie Wetli	1.73 m (5 ft 8 in)	67 kg (148 lb)	4 February 2000 (aged 21)	(Switzerland) HT Thurgau Ladies
20	G	Andrea Brändli	1.67 m (5 ft 6 in)	72 kg (159 lb)	5 June 1997 (aged 24)	(United States) Ohio State Buckeyes
21	F	Rahel Enzler	1.63 m (5 ft 4 in)	66 kg (146 lb)	30 July 2000 (aged 21)	(United States) Maine Black Bears
22	D	Sinja Leemann	1.66 m (5 ft 5 in)	60 kg (130 lb)	19 April 2002 (aged 19)	(Switzerland) ZSC Lions
23	D	Nicole Bullo	1.60 m (5 ft 3 in)	54 kg (119 lb)	18 July 1987 (aged 34)	(Switzerland) HC Ladies Lugano
24	F	Noemi Ryhner	1.65 m (5 ft 5 in)	62 kg (137 lb)	24 April 2000 (aged 21)	(Sweden) Luleå HF/MSSK
25	F	Alina Müller	1.67 m (5 ft 6 in)	65 kg (143 lb)	12 March 1998 (aged 23)	(United States) Northeastern Huskies
26	F	Dominique Rüegg	1.73 m (5 ft 8 in)	79 kg (174 lb)	5 February 1996 (aged 25)	(Switzerland) ZSC Lions
28	F	Alina Marti	1.67 m (5 ft 6 in)	66 kg (146 lb)	23 April 2004 (aged 17)	(Switzerland) ZSC Lions
29	G	Saskia Maurer	1.66 m (5 ft 5 in)	59 kg (130 lb)	29 July 2001 (aged 20)	(United States) St. Thomas Tommies
39	G	Caroline Spies	1.68 m (5 ft 6 in)	66 kg (146 lb)	2 July 2002 (aged 19)	(Switzerland) EHC Basel
71	F	Lena Lutz	1.66 m (5 ft 5 in)	68 kg (150 lb)	12 July 2001 (aged 20)	(Switzerland) HC Ladies Lugano
88	F	Phoebe Stänz	1.61 m (5 ft 3 in)	58 kg (128 lb)	7 January 1994 (aged 28)	(Sweden) Leksands IF
98	F	Keely Moy	1.75 m (5 ft 9 in)	74 kg (163 lb)	23 April 1998 (aged 23)	(United States) Harvard Crimson

Group play

Pos	Team	Pld	W	OTW	OTL	L	GF	GA	GD	Pts	Qualification
1	Canada	4	4	0	0	0	33	5	+28	12	Quarterfinals
2	United States	4	3	0	0	1	20	6	+14	9	Quarterfinals
3	Finland	4	1	0	0	3	10	19	−9	3 (Note: Finland 3 Pts, +4 GD; ROC 3 Pts, −2 GD; Switzerland 3 Pts, −2 GD. ROC defeated Switzerland 5–2.)	Quarterfinals
4	ROC	4	1	0	0	3	6	18	−12	3	Quarterfinals
5	Switzerland	4	1	0	0	3	6	27	−21	3	Quarterfinals

Source: IIHF
Rules for classification: Tiebreakers
Notes:

3 February 2022; 12:10 v	Canada	12–1 (3–0, 5–0, 4–1)	Switzerland	Beijing National Indoor Stadium, Beijing; Attendance: 821

Game reference

Ann-Renée Desbiens
Goalies
Andrea Brändli
Referees:
(Russia) Daria Ermak
(Switzerland) Anna Wiegand
Linesmen:
(Germany) Lisa Linnek
(Finland) Linnea Sainio

Fillier (Spooner) – 01:04	1–0
Fillier (Poulin) – 07:55	2–0
Spooner (Fillier, Ambrose) – 11:20	3–0
Johnston (Thompson, Turnbull) – 28:06	4–0
Stacey (Bell) – 28:21	5–0
Spooner (Nurse, Thompson) (PP) – 33:20	6–0
Turnbull (Thompson, Johnston) – 35:40	7–0
Stacey (Shelton) – 37:02	8–0
Turnbull (Rattray, Spooner) – 46:14	9–0
	9–1	48:30 – Stalder (Christen) (PP2)
Bell (Turnbull, Johnston) – 53:46	10–1
Thompson (Johnston, Nurse) – 56:20	11–1
Ambrose (Spooner, Thompson) (PP) – 59:58	12–1

14 min
Penalties
8 min
70
Shots
15

4 February 2022; 12:10 v	ROC	5–2 (2–1, 2–1, 1–0)	Switzerland	Beijing National Indoor Stadium, Beijing

Game reference

Maria Sorokina
Goalies
Andrea Brändli
Referees:
(Canada) Cianna Lieffers
(Canada) Elizabeth Mantha
Linesmen:
(United States) Kendall Hanley
(United States) Jacqueline Spresser

Dobrodeyeva (Vafina, Pavlova) – 05:54	1–0
	1–1	17:16 – Stalder (Christen, Müller) (PP)
Bolgareva (Kadirova) – 17:29	2–1
	2–2	26:57 – Müller (Ryhner) (SH)
Shibanova (Pechnikova, Bratisheva) – 30:30	3–2
Bolgareva (Kadirova) – 37:07	4–2
Bolgareva (Vafina) (SH) – 41:39	5–2

10 min
Penalties
6 min
31
Shots
30

6 February 2022; 21:10 v	Switzerland	0–8 (0–5, 0–2, 0–1)	United States	Wukesong Arena, Beijing; Attendance: 545

Game reference

Andrea Brändli
Saskia Maurer
Goalies
Alex Cavallini
Referees:
(Sweden) Maria Furberg
(Canada) Lacey Senuk
Linesmen:
(Canada) Alex Clarke
(United States) Sara Strong

0–1	05:40 – Knight (Brandt, Keller) (PP)
0–2	14:04 – Compher (Scamurra, Bozek)
0–3	14:13 – Knight
0–4	16:15 – Pannek
0–5	19:38 – Kessel (Dunne, Barnes)
0–6	22:11 – Pannek (Kessel, Carpenter)
0–7	37:12 – Compher (Bozek, Dunne)
0–8	57:29 – Cameranesi (Pannek, Barnes)

8 min
Penalties
4 min
12
Shots
66

7 February 2022; 21:10 v	Switzerland	3–2 (1–0, 1–1, 1–1)	Finland	Beijing National Indoor Stadium, Beijing; Attendance: 742

Game reference

Andrea Brändli
Goalies
Anni Keisala
Referees:
(Canada) Cianna Lieffers
(Canada) Elizabeth Mantha
Linesmen:
(United States) Kendall Hanley
(Russia) Diana Mokhova

Christen (Müller, Stalder) (PP2) – 11:52	1–0
	1–1	27:49 – Laitinen (Savolainen, Tuominen) (PP)
Rüegg (Müller, Leemann) (PP, EA) – 30:00	2–1
Stalder (Müller, Sigrist) – 41:21	3–1
	3–2	50:11 – Holopainen (Vainikkaa, Tulus)

6 min
Penalties
14 min
24
Shots
40

Quarterfinals

12 February 2022; 12:10 v	ROC	2–4 (0–0, 1–1, 1–3)	Switzerland	Wukesong Arena, Beijing; Attendance: 670

Game reference

Valeria Merkusheva
Goalies
Andrea Brändli
Referees:
(United States) Kelly Cooke
(United States) Chelsea Rapin
Linesmen:
(Finland) Jenni Heikkinen
(United States) Sara Strong

	0–1	34:31 – Stänz (Müller, Stalder)
Savonina (Shokhina, Korzhakova) – 37:38	1–1
	1–2	47:31 – Rüegg (Moy, Vallario)
Kadirova (Luchnikova, Provorova) – 56:53	2–2
	2–3	57:23 – Müller (Stalder)
	2–4	59:58 – Müller (SH, ENG)

4 min
Penalties
6 min
24
Shots
36

Semifinals

14 February 2022; 12:10 v	Canada	10–3 (5–1, 3–2, 2–0)	Switzerland	Wukesong Arena, Beijing; Attendance: 645

Game reference

Ann-Renee Desbiens
Goalies
Andrea Brändli
Saskia Maurer
Referees:
(Finland) Anniina Nurmi
(United States) Chelsea Rapin
Linesmen:
(Finland) Jenni Hekkinen
(United States) Jackie Spresser

Thompson (Johnston) – 07:16	1–0
Rattray (Ambrose, Fillier) – 08:28	2–0
Turnbull (Thompson, Johnston) – 09:04	3–0
Fast (Nurse, Jenner) – 09:21	4–0
Ambrose (Daoust, Spooner) – 10:40	5–0
	5–1	18:37 – Stalder (Müller) (PP)
	5–2	24:59 – Müller (Stalder)
Poulin (Nurse) – 27:52	6–2
Clark (Johnston, Turnbull) – 28:03	7–2
	7–3	29:44 – Stalder (PP)
Poulin (Nurse, Thompson) – 33:27	8–3
Maltais (Stacey, Saulnier) – 43:13	9–3
Jenner (Nurse) – 58:11	10–3

8 min
Penalties
4 min
61
Shots
13

Bronze medal game

16 February 2022; 19:30 v	Finland	4–0 (1–0, 0–0, 3–0)	Switzerland	Wukesong Arena, Beijing; Attendance: 724

Game reference

Anni Keisala
Goalies
Andrea Brändli
Referees:
(Canada) Elizabeth Mantha
(Canada) Lacey Senuk
Linesmen:
(Canada) Alex Clarke
(United States) Sara Strong

Vainikkaa (Tulus, Holopainen) – 11:38	1–0
Tapani (SH) – 43:24	2–0
Laitinen (Holopainen, Savolainen) (PP) – 54:24	3–0
Karvinen (Nieminen, Hiirikoski) (PP) – 59:03	4–0

8 min
Penalties
8 min
47
Shots
15

== Luge ==
Based on the results during the 2021–22 Luge World Cup season, Switzerland qualified 1 sled in the women's singles.

Athlete	Event	Run 1		Run 2		Run 3		Run 4		Total	
Athlete	Event	Time	Rank	Time	Rank	Time	Rank	Time	Rank	Time	Rank
Natalie Maag	Women's singles	59.018	11	59.117	13	58.913	14	58.892	10	3:55.940	9

== Skeleton ==
Athlete	Event	Run 1		Run 2		Run 3		Run 4		Total	
Athlete	Event	Time	Rank	Time	Rank	Time	Rank	Time	Rank	Time	Rank
Basil Sieber	Men's	1:01.95	21	1:02.16	22	1:02.72	25	Did not advance		3:06.83	22

== Ski jumping ==
Men

Athlete	Event	Qualification			First round			Final			Total	
Athlete	Event	Distance	Points	Rank	Distance	Points	Rank	Distance	Points	Rank	Points	Rank
Simon Ammann	Large hill	121.5	109.9	24 Q	131.5	122.4	27	132.5	129.0	20	251.4	25
Gregor Deschwanden	Large hill	119.0	104.8	29 Q	132.0	127.8	20	131.5	126.4	24	254.2	22
Killian Peier	Large hill	113.5	94.8	39 Q	130.0	123.5	26	129.0	122.0	27	245.5	27
Dominik Peter	Large hill	115.0	98.4	34 Q	126.0	114.3	36	Did not advance				
Simon Ammann	Normal hill	96.0	100.4	12 Q	101.0	123.7	25	97.0	115.8	24	239.5	25
Gregor Deschwanden	Normal hill	96.5	106.4	7 Q	99.5	127.6	20	99.0	123.2	16	250.8	17
Killian Peier	Normal hill	93.0	92.8	20 Q	90.5	114.6	37	Did not advance				
Dominik Peter	Normal hill	91.5	88.9	25 Q	95.5	116.0	35	Did not advance				
Simon Ammann; Gregor Deschwanden; Killian Peier; Dominik Peter	Large hill team	—N/a			468.5	367.0	8	488.0	424.5	7	791.5	8

== Snowboarding ==
Freestyle

Athlete	Event	Qualification					Final				
Athlete	Event	Run 1	Run 2	Run 3	Best	Rank	Run 1	Run 2	Run 3	Best	Rank
Jonas Bösiger	Men's big air	60.00	~~9.50~~	15.75	75.75	27	Did not advance				
Nicolas Huber	Men's big air	64.25	75.00	~~24.75~~	139.25	14	Did not advance				
Patrick Burgener	Men's halfpipe	70.75	73.00	—N/a	73.00	11 Q	54.50	5.75	69.50	69.50	11
David Hablützel	Men's halfpipe	15.50	14.00	—N/a	15.50	24	Did not advance				
Jan Scherrer	Men's halfpipe	73.50	79.25	—N/a	79.25	8 Q	70.50	87.25	7.50	87.25	3rd place, bronze medalist(s)
Ariane Burri	Women's big air	57.75	~~18.75~~	27.25	85.00	23	Did not advance				
Bianca Gisler	Women's big air	~~50.00~~	63.50	63.75	127.25	13	Did not advance				
Berenice Wicki	Women's halfpipe	71.50	40.50	—N/a	71.50	8 Q	76.25	74.75	11.25	76.25	7
Ariane Burri	Women's slopestyle	33.15	65.55	—N/a	65.55	12 Q	21.40	24.01	18.86	24.01	12
Bianca Gisler	Women's slopestyle	40.35	38.43	—N/a	40.35	20	Did not advance				

Parallel

Athlete	Event	Qualification		Round of 16	Quarterfinal	Semifinal	Final	
Athlete	Event	Time	Rank	Opposition Time	Opposition Time	Opposition Time	Opposition Time	Rank
Gian Casanova	Men's giant slalom	1:25.13	28	Did not advance				
Dario Caviezel	Men's giant slalom	1:22.35	14 Q	Prommegger (AUT); L +0.16	Did not advance			14
Nevin Galmarini	Men's giant slalom	1:23.44	21	Did not advance				
Ladina Jenny	Women's giant slalom	1:28.98	17	Did not advance				
Jessica Keiser	Women's giant slalom	1:47.15	28	Did not advance				
Patrizia Kummer	Women's giant slalom	1:28.48	12 Q	Dujmovits (AUT); L +0.20	Did not advance			14
Julie Zogg	Women's giant slalom	1:28.40	11 Q	Langenhorst (GER); L +0.08	Did not advance			13

Snowboard cross

Athlete	Event	Seeding		1/8 final	Quarterfinal	Semifinal	Final	
Athlete	Event	Time	Rank	Position	Position	Position	Position	Rank
Kalle Koblet	Men's	1:18.94	22	3	Did not advance			23
Lara Casanova	Women's	1:24.12	17	3	Did not advance			20
Sophie Hediger	Women's	1:25.14	15	3	Did not advance			19
Sina Siegenthaler	Women's	1:26.62	28	2 Q	4	Did not advance		16
Kalle Koblet; Sophie Hediger	Mixed team	—N/a			2 Q	4 FB	3	7

== Speed skating ==
Switzerland qualified two speed skaters (one of each gender).

Athlete	Event	Final	
Athlete	Event	Time	Rank
Livio Wenger	Men's 5000 m	6:27.01	18

Mass start

Athlete	Event	Semifinal			Final		
Athlete	Event	Points	Time	Rank	Points	Time	Rank
Livio Wenger	Men's mass start	20	7:44.08	3 Q	4	7:47.86	7
Nadja Wenger	Women's mass start	0	8:31.50	10	Did not advance		21

== See also ==
- Switzerland at the 2022 Winter Paralympics
