= 2020 IIHF U18 Women's World Championship =

Tournament details
- Host country: Slovakia
- Venue: 1 (in 1 host city)
- Dates: 26 December 2019 – 2 January 2020
- Teams: 8

Final positions
- Champions: United States (8th title)
- Runners-up: Canada
- Third place: Russia
- Fourth place: Finland

Tournament statistics
- Games played: 21
- Goals scored: 86 (4.1 per game)
- Attendance: 7,538 (359 per game)
- Scoring leader: (Russia) Kristi Shashkina (8 points)

Awards
- MVP: (Russia) Kristi Shashkina

Official website
- iihf.com/en/events/2020/ww18

The 2020 IIHF U18 Women's World Championship was the 13th IIHF U18 Women's World Championship in ice hockey.

== Top Division ==
=== Match officials ===
9 referees and 9 linesmen were selected for the tournament.

Referees

- (Finland) Henna Åberg
- (Russia) Darya Abrosimova
- (Canada) Gabrielle Ariano-Lortie
- (United States) Kelly Cooke
- (Switzerland) Drahomíra Fialova
- (Russia) Elena Ivanova
- (Czech Republic) Gabriela Malá
- (Canada) Vanessa Morin
- (Germany) Svenja Strohmenger

Linesmen

- (Sweden) Liv Andersson
- (Slovakia) Magdaléna Čerhitová
- (Norway) Stephanie Cole
- (Russia) Polina Danilova
- (Belgium) Marine Dinant
- (United States) Kendall Hanley
- (United Kingdom) Amy Lack
- (Canada) Justine Todd
- (China) Wang Hui

=== Preliminary round ===
All times are local (UTC+1).

==== Group A ====
Pos	Team	Pld	W	OTW	OTL	L	GF	GA	GD	Pts	Qualification
1	Canada	3	2	1	0	0	9	4	+5	8	Semifinals
2	United States	3	2	0	0	1	6	3	+3	6	Semifinals
3	Russia	3	1	0	1	1	6	6	0	4	Quarterfinals
4	Finland	3	0	0	0	3	4	12	−8	0	Quarterfinals

Source: IIHF
Rules for classification: 1) points; 2) head-to-head points; 3) head-to-head goal difference; 4) head-to-head number of goals scored; 5) result against closest best-ranked team outside tied teams; 6) result against second-best ranked team outside tied teams; 7) seeding before tournament.

26 December 2019; 12:30	Canada	3–2 OT (1–0, 1–0, 0–2) (OT: 1–0)	Russia	Vladimír Dzurilla Ice Rink – Hall 1 Attendance: 298

Game reference

Ève Gascon
Goalies
Anna Alpatova
Referees:
(United States) Kelly Cooke
(Switzerland) Drahomíra Fialova
Linesmen:
(Sweden) Liv Andersson
(China) Wang Hui

Naud (Labad, Cherkowski) – 19:00	1–0
Paul (Wheeler) – 23:55	2–0
	2–1	50:35 – Korzhakova (Luchnikova)
	2–2	53:49 – Shashkina (Korzhakova, Luchnikova)
Gosling (Buglioni) – 63:12	3–2

8 min
Penalties
8 min
36
Shots
19

26 December 2019; 16:30	United States	4–1 (1–1, 2–0, 1–0)	Finland	Vladimír Dzurilla Ice Rink – Hall 1 Attendance: 311

Game reference

Skylar Vetter
Goalies
Kiia Lahtinen
Referees:
(Russia) Darya Abrosimova
(Canada) Vanessa Morin
Linesmen:
(Russia) Polina Danilova
(Canada) Justine Todd

Murphy (Winn) (PP) – 10:36	1–0
	1–1	11:38 – Yrjänen (Sundelin, Rantala) (PP)
Van Wieren (Eden) – 33:40	2–1
Wethington (Zanon, Nicholson) – 39:59	3–1
Guilday (Eden) – 40:37	4–1

6 min
Penalties
8 min
51
Shots
10

27 December 2019; 12:30	Finland	1–4 (1–1, 0–0, 0–3)	Canada	Vladimír Dzurilla Ice Rink – Hall 1 Attendance: 378

Game reference

Aino Laitinen
Goalies
Kayle Osborne
Referees:
(United States) Kelly Cooke
(Germany) Svenja Strohmenger
Linesmen:
(Sweden) Liv Andersson
(United States) Kendall Hanley

	0–1	05:16 – Bochna (Buglioni)
N. Laitinen (Rantala, Yrjänen) (PP) – 19:21	1–1
	1–2	46:53 – Kettyle (Picard)
	1–3	52:37 – Wheeler (Cherkowski)
	1–4	54:55 – Lussier (Wozniewicz) (ENG)

8 min
Penalties
14 min
13
Shots
31

27 December 2019; 16:30	United States	1–0 (0–0, 0–0, 1–0)	Russia	Vladimír Dzurilla Ice Rink – Hall 1 Attendance: 292

Game reference
Amanda Thiele	Goalies	Yulia Volkova	Referees: (Finland) Henna Åberg (Czech Republic) Gabriela Malá; Linesmen: (Slovakia) Magdaléna Čerhitová (Belgium) Marine Dinant
Huber (EA) – 54:31 / 1–0			Referees: (Finland) Henna Åberg (Czech Republic) Gabriela Malá; Linesmen: (Slovakia) Magdaléna Čerhitová (Belgium) Marine Dinant
4 min	Penalties	4 min	Referees: (Finland) Henna Åberg (Czech Republic) Gabriela Malá; Linesmen: (Slovakia) Magdaléna Čerhitová (Belgium) Marine Dinant
25	Shots	20	Referees: (Finland) Henna Åberg (Czech Republic) Gabriela Malá; Linesmen: (Slovakia) Magdaléna Čerhitová (Belgium) Marine Dinant

29 December 2019; 12:30	Canada	2–1 (1–0, 0–0, 1–1)	United States	Vladimír Dzurilla Ice Rink – Hall 1 Attendance: 719

Game reference

Ève Gascon
Goalies
Skylar Vetter
Referees:
(Finland) Henna Åberg
(Russia) Darya Abrosimova
Linesmen:
(Russia) Polina Danilova
(Belgium) Marine Dinant

Cherkowski (Wheeler) – 00:20	1–0
Picard – 54:23	2–0
	2–1	59:58 – Eden (Webster, Zanon) (PP2, EA)

12 min
Penalties
6 min
38
Shots
28

29 December 2019; 16:30	Russia	4–2 (1–1, 3–1, 0–0)	Finland	Vladimír Dzurilla Ice Rink – Hall 1 Attendance: 320

Game reference

Anna Alpatova
Goalies
Kiia Lahtinen
Referees:
(Switzerland) Drahomíra Fialova
(Canada) Vanessa Morin
Linesmen:
(Norway) Stephanie Cole
(United States) Kendall Hanley

Luchnikova (Shashkina) – 01:46	1–0
	1–1	17:24 – N. Laitinen (Rantala, Yrjänen) (PP)
	1–2	20:56 – Rantala (N. Laitinen) (PP)
Shashkina (Butorina) – 21:50	2–2
Shashkina (Luchnikova) – 24:46	3–2
Markova (Akhmetova) – 36:39	4–2

16 min
Penalties
6 min
19
Shots
30

==== Group B ====
Pos	Team	Pld	W	OTW	OTL	L	GF	GA	GD	Pts	Qualification
1	Czech Republic	3	2	0	1	0	9	4	+5	7	Quarterfinals
2	Sweden	3	2	0	0	1	7	5	+2	6	Quarterfinals
3	Switzerland	3	0	1	1	1	4	6	−2	3	Relegation round
4	Slovakia (H)	3	0	1	0	2	6	11	−5	2	Relegation round

Source: IIHF
Rules for classification: 1) points; 2) head-to-head points; 3) head-to-head goal difference; 4) head-to-head number of goals scored; 5) result against closest best-ranked team outside tied teams; 6) result against second-best ranked team outside tied teams; 7) seeding before tournament.
(H) Host

26 December 2019; 16:30	Switzerland	2–1 OT (0–1, 0–0, 1–0) (OT: 1–0)	Czech Republic	Vladimír Dzurilla Ice Rink – Hall 2 Attendance: 99

Game reference

Caroline Spies
Goalies
Julie Pejšová
Referees:
(Finland) Henna Åberg
(Russia) Elena Ivanova
Linesmen:
(Slovakia) Magdaléna Čerhitová
(Norway) Stephanie Cole

	0–1	16:56 – Haasová (Habartová)
Marti (Christen) – 43:10	1–1
Zimmermann (Christen, Leemann) – 60:28	2–1

4 min
Penalties
4 min
22
Shots
23

26 December 2019; 20:30	Sweden	4–2 (0–0, 3–0, 1–2)	Slovakia	Vladimír Dzurilla Ice Rink – Hall 1 Attendance: 543

Game reference

Ida Boman
Goalies
Laura Medviďová
Referees:
(Czech Republic) Gabriela Malá
(Germany) Svenja Strohmenger
Linesmen:
(Belgium) Marine Dinant
(United Kingdom) Amy Lack

L. Johansson (Forsgren, G. Johansson) – 27:22	1–0
Svensson (Albinsson, L. Johansson) (PP) – 34:03	2–0
Thuvik (Ahlm, Hall) – 38:32	3–0
Blom (G. Johansson, Grundström) – 56:03	4–0
	4–1	56:37 – Kapičáková (Halušková, Vysokajová) (PP)
	4–2	59:52 – Leskovjanská

10 min
Penalties
8 min
36
Shots
24

27 December 2019; 16:30	Czech Republic	3–1 (1–0, 0–1, 2–0)	Sweden	Vladimír Dzurilla Ice Rink – Hall 2 Attendance: 100

Game reference

Viktorie Švejdová
Goalies
Ida Boman
Referees:
(Canada) Gabrielle Ariano-Lortie
(Switzerland) Drahomíra Fialova
Linesmen:
(Russia) Polina Danilova
(United Kingdom) Amy Lack

Haasová (Kaltounková) – 04:46	1–0
	1–1	32:10 – Svensson (L. Johansson) (PP)
Kalová (Mazancová, Škorpíková) – 47:40	2–1
Kaltounková (Čajanová, Haasová) – 58:35	3–1

6 min
Penalties
6 min
32
Shots
23

27 December 2019; 20:30	Switzerland	2–3 OT (0–0, 0–1, 2–1) (OT: 0–1)	Slovakia	Vladimír Dzurilla Ice Rink – Hall 1 Attendance: 527

Game reference

Caroline Spies
Goalies
Laura Medviďová
Referees:
(Russia) Darya Abrosimova
(Canada) Vanessa Morin
Linesmen:
(Norway) Stephanie Cole
(China) Wang Hui

	0–1	36:03 – Štetiarová (Dobošová)
Leemann (EA) – 50:06	1–1
	1–2	54:23 – Halušková (Matejková)
Surdez (Frey) – 55:45	2–2
	2–3	62:52 – Matejková

6 min
Penalties
18 min
23
Shots
20

29 December 2019; 16:30	Sweden	2–0 (1–0, 0–0, 1–0)	Switzerland	Vladimír Dzurilla Ice Rink – Hall 2 Attendance: 99

Game reference
Ida Boman	Goalies	Caroline Spies	Referees: (Russia) Elena Ivanova (Germany) Svenja Strohmenger; Linesmen: (Slovakia) Magdaléna Čerhitová (Canada) Justine Todd
Silén (Lindberg) – 10:55 / 1–0; T. Johansson (Markström) (ENG) – 58:39 / 2–0			Referees: (Russia) Elena Ivanova (Germany) Svenja Strohmenger; Linesmen: (Slovakia) Magdaléna Čerhitová (Canada) Justine Todd
14 min	Penalties	2 min	Referees: (Russia) Elena Ivanova (Germany) Svenja Strohmenger; Linesmen: (Slovakia) Magdaléna Čerhitová (Canada) Justine Todd
21	Shots	9	Referees: (Russia) Elena Ivanova (Germany) Svenja Strohmenger; Linesmen: (Slovakia) Magdaléna Čerhitová (Canada) Justine Todd

29 December 2019; 20:30	Slovakia	1–5 (0–1, 0–2, 1–2)	Czech Republic	Vladimír Dzurilla Ice Rink – Hall 1 Attendance: 1,248

Game reference

Laura Medviďová
Nikola Zimková
Goalies
Julie Pejšová
Referees:
(Canada) Gabrielle Ariano-Lortie
(United States) Kelly Cooke
Linesmen:
(Sweden) Liv Andersson
(United Kingdom) Amy Lack

	0–1	08:34 – Kaltounková (Hanzlíková, Čajanová) (PP)
	0–2	25:05 – Mazancová (SH)
	0–3	39:34 – Haasová (Kaltounková, D. Pejšová)
	0–4	50:49 – D. Pejšová (Gruntová) (EA)
Halušková (Vysokajová) (PP) – 54:38	1–4
	1–5	59:52 – Hrubanová (Bartáková, Gruntová)

8 min
Penalties
8 min
20
Shots
33

=== Relegation round ===
The third and fourth placed team from Group B played a best-of-three series to determine the relegated team.

30 December 2019; 20:30	Switzerland	4–1 (4–0, 0–0, 0–1)	Slovakia	Vladimír Dzurilla Ice Rink – Hall 2 Attendance: 100

Game reference

Caroline Spies
Goalies
Laura Medviďová
Nikola Zimková
Referees:
(Canada) Gabrielle Ariano-Lortie
(Germany) Svenja Strohmenger
Linesmen:
(United States) Kendall Hanley
(China) Wang Hui

Staub (Zimmermann, Leemann) (PP) – 06:37	1–0
Zimmermann (Zogg, Gianola) – 09:37	2–0
Zimmermann (Leemann, Christen) (PP) – 13:42	3–0
S. Bachmann (Leemann) – 15:51	4–0
	4–1	53:53 – Halušková (Matejková, Jašková) (PP, EA)

2 min
Penalties
8 min
27
Shots
10

1 January 2020; 16:30	Slovakia	1–2 (1–0, 0–2, 0–0)	Switzerland	Vladimír Dzurilla Ice Rink – Hall 2 Attendance: 100

Game reference

Nikola Zimková
Goalies
Caroline Spies
Referees:
(Russia) Darya Abrosimova
(Czech Republic) Gabriela Malá
Linesmen:
(United Kingdom) Amy Lack
(China) Wang Hui

Dobošová (Lahová) – 04:15	1–0
	1–1	24:58 – Marti (Ingold, Frey) (PP)
	1–2	36:46 – Zimmermann (Surdez)

6 min
Penalties
6 min
17
Shots
18

=== Playoff round ===
Teams were reseeded for the semifinals in accordance with the following ranking:

1. tier of the group;
2. position in the group.

Rank	Team	Group	Pos
1	Canada	A	1
2	United States	A	2
3	Russia	A	3
4	Finland	A	4
5	Czech Republic	B	1
6	Sweden	B	2

==== Bracket ====
Quarterfinals
30 December
4A Finland	3
1B Czech Republic	1
30 December
3A Russia	4
2B Sweden	0

Semifinals
1 January
1 Canada	4
4 Finland	1
1 January
2 United States	3
3 Russia	0

Final
2 January
1 Canada	1
2 United States (OT)	2
Third place
2 January
3 Russia	6
4 Finland	1

==== Quarterfinals ====
30 December 2019; 16:30	Finland	3–1 (2–0, 1–0, 0–1)	Czech Republic	Vladimír Dzurilla Ice Rink – Hall 1 Attendance: 213

Game reference

Kiia Lahtinen
Goalies
Julie Pejšová
Viktorie Švejdová
Referees:
(Russia) Darya Abrosimova
(Russia) Elena Ivanova
Linesmen:
(Sweden) Liv Andersson
(Canada) Justine Todd

Rantala (Sundelin) – 07:55	1–0
Nuutinen – 19:53	2–0
Yrjänen – 25:02	3–0
	3–1	47:38 – Haasová (Škorpíková)

6 min
Penalties
14 min
33
Shots
12

30 December 2019; 20:30	Russia	4–0 (2–0, 0–0, 2–0)	Sweden	Vladimír Dzurilla Ice Rink – Hall 1 Attendance: 193

Game reference

Anna Alpatova
Goalies
Ida Boman
Ebba Svensson Träff
Referees:
(Switzerland) Drahomíra Fialova
(Czech Republic) Gabriela Malá
Linesmen:
(Norway) Stephanie Cole
(Belgium) Marine Dinant

Glukhareva (Boriskova) – 06:29	1–0
Korzhakova (Luchnikova, Shashkina) – 18:25	2–0
Shashkina (Luchnikova, Petina) – 40:33	3–0
Ponyatovskaya (Shashkina , Shashkina) (PP) – 42:47	4–0

10 min
Penalties
8 min
32
Shots
19

==== Semifinals ====
1 January 2020; 12:30	Canada	4–1 (3–0, 0–0, 1–1)	Finland	Vladimír Dzurilla Ice Rink – Hall 1 Attendance: 316

Game reference

Ève Gascon
Kayle Osborne
Goalies
Kiia Lahtinen
Referees:
(United States) Kelly Cooke
(Switzerland) Drahomíra Fialova
Linesmen:
(Belgium) Marine Dinant
(United States) Kendall Hanley

Picard (Messier) – 06:11	1–0
Buglioni (Legros) – 07:12	2–0
Bochna (Messier, Buglioni) – 19:28	3–0
	3–1	44:46 – N. Laitinen (Sundelin, Rantala) (PP)
Cooper – 49:11	4–1

14 min
Penalties
10 min
30
Shots
15

1 January 2020; 16:30	United States	3–0 (2–0, 1–0, 0–0)	Russia	Vladimír Dzurilla Ice Rink – Hall 1 Attendance: 456

Game reference

Amanda Thiele
Goalies
Yulia Volkova
Referees:
(Canada) Gabrielle Ariano-Lortie
(Canada) Vanessa Morin
Linesmen:
(Sweden) Liv Andersson
(Canada) Justine Todd

Lobdell (Simms, Biotti) – 07:16	1–0
Eden (Burgen) – 10:10	2–0
Gentry (Simms) – 32:47	3–0

12 min
Penalties
2 min
33
Shots
15

==== Fifth place game ====
1 January 2020; 20:30	Czech Republic	0–1 (0–0, 0–0, 0–1)	Sweden	Vladimír Dzurilla Ice Rink – Hall 1 Attendance: 152

Game reference
Viktorie Švejdová	Goalies	Ida Boman	Referees: (Finland) Henna Åberg (Russia) Elena Ivanova; Linesmen: (Slovakia) Magdaléna Čerhitová (Russia) Polina Danilova
0–1 / 48:35 – T. Johansson (Silén, Karlsson)			Referees: (Finland) Henna Åberg (Russia) Elena Ivanova; Linesmen: (Slovakia) Magdaléna Čerhitová (Russia) Polina Danilova
8 min	Penalties	4 min	Referees: (Finland) Henna Åberg (Russia) Elena Ivanova; Linesmen: (Slovakia) Magdaléna Čerhitová (Russia) Polina Danilova
22	Shots	35	Referees: (Finland) Henna Åberg (Russia) Elena Ivanova; Linesmen: (Slovakia) Magdaléna Čerhitová (Russia) Polina Danilova

==== Bronze medal game ====
2 January 2020; 12:30	Russia	6–1 (2–0, 1–0, 3–1)	Finland	Vladimír Dzurilla Ice Rink – Hall 1 Attendance: 137

Game reference

Anna Alpatova
Goalies
Kiia Lahtinen
Referees:
(United States) Kelly Cooke
(Canada) Vanessa Morin
Linesmen:
(United States) Kendall Hanley
(Canada) Justine Todd

Glukhareva (Boriskova) – 12:44	1–0
Ponyatovskaya (Glukhareva, Butorina) – 18:18	2–0
Glukhareva (Markova) – 28:36	3–0
Markova (Lifatova, Shkalyova) – 43:10	4–0
	4–1	45:35 – Salonen (Rantala, Tervonen)
Sviridova (Shkalyova, Markova) – 54:24	5–1
Glukhareva (Shashkina) – 59:08	6–1

4 min
Penalties
4 min
29
Shots
26

==== Gold medal game ====
2 January 2020; 20:30	Canada	1–2 OT (0–1, 0–0, 1–0) (OT: 0–1)	United States	Vladimír Dzurilla Ice Rink – Hall 1 Attendance: 937

Game reference

Ève Gascon
Goalies
Skylar Vetter
Referees:
(Finland) Henna Åberg
(Russia) Elena Ivanova
Linesmen:
(Slovakia) Magdaléna Čerhitová
(Russia) Polina Danilova

	0–1	14:38 – Murphy (PP)
Paul (Naud) (PP) – 45:38	1–1
	1–2	76:52 – Zanon (Nicholson)

8 min
Penalties
12 min
32
Shots
34

=== Final ranking ===
Pos	Grp	Team	Pld	W	OTW	OTL	L	GF	GA	GD	Pts	Final result
1	A	United States	5	3	1	0	1	11	4	+7	11	Champions
2	A	Canada	5	3	1	1	0	14	7	+7	12	Runners-up
3	A	Russia	6	3	0	1	2	16	10	+6	10	Third place
4	A	Finland	6	1	0	0	5	9	23	−14	3	Fourth place
5	B	Sweden	5	3	0	0	2	8	9	−1	9	Fifth place game
6	B	Czech Republic	5	2	0	1	2	10	8	+2	7	Fifth place game
7	B	Switzerland	5	2	1	1	1	10	8	+2	9	Advance in Relegation
8	B	Slovakia (H)	5	0	1	0	4	8	17	−9	2	Relegation to Division I A

Source: IIHF
(H) Host

=== Statistics ===
==== Scoring leaders ====
Pos	Player	Country	GP	G	A	Pts	+/−	PIM
1	Kristi Shashkina	Russia	6	4	4	8	+6	4
2	Sanni Rantala	Finland	6	2	5	7	–5	2
3	Polina Luchnikova	Russia	6	1	6	7	+4	6
4	Hana Haasová	Czech Republic	5	4	1	5	+6	2
4	Laura Zimmermann	Switzerland	6	4	1	5	+4	6
6	Kristina Glukhareva	Russia	6	4	1	5	+3	0
7	Lacey Eden	United States	5	2	3	5	+5	4
8	Sinja Leemann	Switzerland	5	1	4	5	–1	2
9	Romana Halušková	Slovakia	5	3	1	4	–3	0
10	Nelli Laitinen	Finland	6	3	1	4	–4	2

GP = Games played; G = Goals; A = Assists; Pts = Points; +/− = P Plus–minus; PIM = Penalties In Minutes
Source: IIHF

==== Goaltending leaders ====
(minimum 40% team's total ice time)

Pos	Player	Country	TOI	GA	GAA	SA	Sv%	SO
1	Viktorie Švejdová	Czech Republic	151:46	2	0.79	75	97.33	0
2	Skylar Vetter	United States	195:27	4	1.23	80	95.00	0
3	Anna Alpatova	Russia	243:12	6	1.48	111	94.59	1
4	Ève Gascon	Canada	258:46	6	1.39	96	93.74	0
5	Ida Boman	Sweden	298:56	9	1.81	129	93.02	2

TOI = Time on ice (minutes:seconds); GA = Goals against; GAA = Goals against average; SA = Shots against; Sv% = Save percentage; SO = Shutouts
Source: IIHF

=== Awards ===
==== Best players selected by the Directorate ====
- Best Goaltender: (Russia) Anna Alpatova
- Best Defenceman: (Finland) Nelli Laitinen
- Best Forward: (Russia) Kristi Shashkina

Source: IIHF

==== Media All-Stars ====
- MVP: (Russia) Kristi Shashkina
- Goaltender: (Russia) Anna Alpatova
- Defencemen: (Finland) Sanni Rantala / (Canada) Kendall Cooper
- Forwards: (United States) Lacey Eden / (Switzerland) Laura Zimmermann / (Canada) Jenna Buglioni

== Division I ==
=== Group A ===
The tournament was held in Füssen, Germany from 3 to 9 January 2020.

Pos	Team	Pld	W	OTW	OTL	L	GF	GA	GD	Pts	Qualification or relegation
1	Germany (H)	5	4	1	0	0	18	2	+16	14	Promotion to Top Division
2	Japan	5	4	0	0	1	20	3	+17	12	
3	Hungary	5	1	1	2	1	10	9	+1	7	
4	France	5	2	0	0	3	5	16	−11	6	
5	Italy	5	1	1	0	3	10	18	−8	5	
6	Denmark	5	0	0	1	4	5	20	−15	1	Relegation to Division I B

Source: IIHF
Rules for classification: 1) points; 2) head-to-head points; 3) head-to-head goal difference; 4) head-to-head number of goals scored; 5) result against closest best-ranked team outside tied teams; 6) result against second-best ranked team outside tied teams; 7) seeding before tournament.
(H) Host

=== Group B ===
The tournament was held in Katowice, Poland from 2 to 8 January 2020.

Pos	Team	Pld	W	OTW	OTL	L	GF	GA	GD	Pts	Qualification or relegation
1	Norway	5	3	0	2	0	13	7	+6	11 (Note: Austria 1–2 Norway)	Promotion to Division I A
2	Austria	5	3	1	0	1	14	3	+11	11	
3	China	5	2	2	0	1	12	10	+2	10	
4	South Korea	5	1	1	0	3	7	12	−5	5	
5	Poland (H)	5	1	0	1	3	8	9	−1	4 (Note: Great Britain 1–5 Poland)	
6	Great Britain	5	1	0	1	3	5	18	−13	4	Relegation to Division II

Source: IIHF
Rules for classification: 1) points; 2) head-to-head points; 3) head-to-head goal difference; 4) head-to-head number of goals scored; 5) result against closest best-ranked team outside tied teams; 6) result against second-best ranked team outside tied teams; 7) seeding before tournament.
(H) Host

== Division II ==
=== Group A ===
The tournament was held in Eindhoven, Netherlands from 25 to 28 January 2020.

Pos	Team	Pld	W	OTW	OTL	L	GF	GA	GD	Pts	Qualification or relegation
1	Chinese Taipei	3	2	1	0	0	10	7	+3	8	Promotion to Division I B
2	Netherlands (H)	3	2	0	0	1	7	3	+4	6	
3	Australia	3	0	1	0	2	6	8	−2	2 (Note: Kazakhstan 2–3 (OT) Australia)	
4	Kazakhstan	3	0	0	2	1	6	11	−5	2	

Source: IIHF
Rules for classification: 1) points; 2) head-to-head points; 3) head-to-head goal difference; 4) head-to-head number of goals scored; 5) result against closest best-ranked team outside tied teams; 6) result against second-best ranked team outside tied teams; 7) seeding before tournament.
(H) Host

=== Group B ===
The tournament was held in Mexico City, Mexico from 28 January to 2 February 2020.

Pos	Team	Pld	W	OTW	OTL	L	GF	GA	GD	Pts
1	Spain	3	3	0	0	0	18	3	+15	9
2	Turkey	3	2	0	0	1	5	11	−6	6
3	Mexico (H)	3	1	0	0	2	4	6	−2	3
4	New Zealand	3	0	0	0	3	4	11	−7	0

Source: IIHF
Rules for classification: 1) points; 2) head-to-head points; 3) head-to-head goal difference; 4) head-to-head number of goals scored; 5) result against closest best-ranked team outside tied teams; 6) result against second-best ranked team outside tied teams; 7) seeding before tournament.
(H) Host
