= Polina Luchnikova =

Russian ice hockey forward

Polina Luchnikova Полина Лучникова
- Born: 30 January 2002 (age 24) Serov, Russia
- Height: 1.67 m (5 ft 6 in)
- Position: Forward
- Shoots: Left
- ZhHL team Former teams: Agidel Ufa; SKIF Nizhny Novgorod
- National team: Russia
- Playing career: 2017–present
Medal record
U18 World Championship
Bronze medal – third place	2020 Slovakia

Polina Evgenyevna Luchnikova (Russian: Полина Евгеньевна Лучникова, romanized: Polina Yevgen'yevna Luchnikova; born 30 January 2002) is a Russian ice hockey forward and member of the Russian national ice hockey team, currently playing in the Zhenskaya Hockey League (ZhHL) with Agidel Ufa.

Luchnikova represented the Russian Olympic Committee (ROC) in the women's ice hockey tournament at the 2022 Winter Olympics in Beijing.

== Playing career ==
Luchnikova made her ZhHL debut with SKIF Nizhny Novgorod in the 2017–18 season. After her rookie season concluded, she signed with Agidel Ufa for the 2018–19 season and has since remained with the club. She won the Russian Championship with Agidel Ufa in 2019 and 2021.

=== International play ===
Luchnikova competed as a member of the Russian national under-18 team at the IIHF Women's U18 World Championships in 2018, 2019, and 2020. She won a bronze medal at the 2020 tournament, where she led the Russian team in assists, with 6 assists in six games, and was the team’s second leading scorer, trailing point leader Kristi Shashkina by just one point.

The 2022 Winter Olympics were her first major tournament with the senior national team. She played in five games and earned an assist on the second goal (scored by Fanuza Kadirova) in a 4–2 loss for the ROC in the quarterfinal match against Switzerland.
