= HC Agidel Ufa =

ZhHL ice hockey team in Ufa, Bashkiria, Russia

Agidel Ufa Агидель Уфa
- City: Ufa, Bashkortostan, Russia
- League: Zhenskaya Hockey League
- Founded: 2010
- Home arena: Ice Palace Salavat Yulaev
- Colours: Blue, green
- Owner(s): HC Salavat Yulaev
- Head coach: Denis Afinogenov
- Captain: Maria Pechnikova
- Website: hcsalavat.ru/agidel

Championships
- Regular season titles: 3 (2018, 2019, 2020)
- Russian Championships: 3 (2018, 2019, 2021)

Agidel Ufa (Russian: Агидель Уфa) are a professional ice hockey team in the Zhenskaya Hockey League (ZhHL). They play in Ufa, Republic of Bashkortostan, Russia at the Ice Palace Salavat Yulaev. The team was founded in 2010 and competed in the Russian Women's Hockey League until the league was replaced by the Zhenskaya Hockey League in 2015. Agidel is one of the original teams from the inaugural season of the Zhenskaya Hockey League and have won the Russian Championship three times, in 2018, 2019, and 2021.

The team is a part of the Salavat Yulaev hockey organization, of which Salavat Yulaev Ufa of the KHL, Toros Neftekamsk of the VHL, and Tolpar Ufa of the MHL are also parts.

== Players and personnel ==
=== 2024–25 roster ===
As of 20 January 2025

No.	Nat	Player	Pos	S/G	Age	Acquired	Birthplace
24	(Russia)	Yekaterina Abdulmanova	F	L	17	2024	Salavat, Bashkortostan
45	(Russia)	Kristina Bannikova	F	L	20	2024	Nizhny, Nizhny Novgorod Oblast
2	(Russia)	Maria Batalova	D	L	29	2017	Mezhdurechye, Chuvashia
71	(Russia)	Yelizaveta Dubey	F	L	18	2022	Krasnovishersk, Perm Krai
10	(Russia)	Kamilla Galikhanova	F	L	19	2021	Ufa, Bashkortostan
27	(Russia)	Veronika Korzhakova	F	L	22	2018	Chelyabinsk, Chelyabinsk Oblast
96	(Russia)	Aleksandra Kozyr	D	L	18	2022	Belgorod, Belgorod Oblast
73	(Russia)	Viktoriya Kulishova	F	L	26	2024	Megion, Khanty-Mansia
87	(Russia)	Polina Luchnikova	F	L	23	2018	Serov, Sverdlovsk Oblast
15	(Russia)	Angelina Makhmutova	D	L	21	2019	Chelyabinsk, Chelyabinsk Oblast
43	(Russia)	Ilona Markova	F	L	24	2018	Kirov, Kirov Oblast
12	(Russia)	Maria Pechnikova (C)	D	L	33	2017	Izhevsk, Udmurtia
31	(Russia)	Anna Prugova	G	L	32	2016	Khabarovsk, Khabarovsk Krai
93	(Russia)	Yelizaveta Rodnova	F	L	26	2017	Chebarkul, Chelyabinsk Oblast
70	(Russia)	Anna Shibanova (A)	D	L	31	2013	Omsk, Omsk Oblast
18	(Russia)	Olga Sosina (A)	F	R	33	2015	Almetievsk, Tatarstan
19	(Russia)	Anna Sviridova	D	R	21	2020	Voskresensk, Moscow Oblast
1	(Russia)	Valeria Tarakanova	G	L	27	2024	Zavolzhye, Nizhny Novgorod Oblast
13	(Russia)	Ksenia Tyurina	F	L	21	2019	Serov, Sverdlovsk Oblast
78	(Russia)	Karina Verkhovtseva	F	L	28	2024	Kazan, Tatarstan
94	(Russia)	Yekaterina Zakharova	D/F	L	31	2024	Ufa, Bashkortostan
44	(Russia)	Alyona Zubkova	D	L	25	2017	Tver, Tver Oblast

Coaching staff and team personnel

- Head coach: Valeri Davletshin
- Assistant coach: Sergei Trudakov
- Medic: Rushan Khalimov
- Massage therapist: Gulshat Abdulmanova

=== Team captaincy history ===
- Yekaterina Pashkevich, 2013–14
- Anna Shibanova, 2016–17
- Yekaterina Lebedeva, 2018–2020
- Maria Pechnikova, 2020–

=== Head coaches ===
- Vladimir Malmygin, 2015–23 December 2015
- Denis Afinogenov, 23 December 2015–2022
- Valeri Davletshin, 2022–

== Team honours ==
=== Russian Champions ===
- (gold) Zhenskaya Hockey League (3): 2018, 2019, 2021
- (silver) Runners-up (1): 2020

== Notable alumni ==
Years active with Agidel listed alongside player name

- Yekaterina Ananina, 2014–2018
- Yelena Dergachyova, 2013–14
- Inna Dyubanok, 2013–2019
- Anna Fagina, 2012–2017
- Angelina Goncharenko, 2013–14
- Alexandra Kapustina, 2015–2018
- Yekaterina Lebedeva, 2014–2020
- Yulia Leskina, 2015–2017
- Yekaterina Smolentseva, 2016–17
- Alexandra Vafina, 2017–18
- Yekaterina Zakharova, 2010–2018

=== International players ===
- (Slovakia) Jana Budajová, 2012–2015
- (Hungary) Fanni Gasparics, 2015–2018
- (Slovakia) Nicol Lucák Čupková, 2011–2022
- (Czech Republic) Alena Polenská, 2018–2020
- (Canada) Sara O'Toole, 2011–2014
- (United States) O'Hara Shipe, 2011–12
