= Sarah Knee =

Hungarian-Canadian ice hockey player

- Born: 29 March 1996 (age 28); Toronto, Ontario, Canada
- Height: 1.85 m (6 ft 1 in)
- Weight: 76 kg (168 lb; 12 st 0 lb)
- Position: Defence
- Shoots: Left
- NSML team Former teams: KalPa Kuopio: KMH Budapest; Cornell Big Red; Toronto Aeros
- National team: Hungary
- Playing career: 2011–present

Sarah Donia Knee (born 29 March 1996) is a Hungarian-Canadian ice hockey player and member of the Hungarian national ice hockey team, currently playing in the Naisten Liiga (NSML) with KalPa Naiset. She represented Hungary at the 2021 IIHF Women's World Championship.

== Playing career ==
Born in Toronto, Knee played minor ice hockey in the Greater Toronto Area throughout her childhood, eventually earning a spot with the Toronto Aeros of the Provincial Women's Hockey League (PWHL) during her senior year of high school. Her college ice hockey career was played during 2014 to 2018, with the Cornell Big Red women's ice hockey program in the Ivy League and ECAC Hockey conferences of the NCAA Division I. In 2018, she was named to the All-Ivy First Team and All-ECAC Hockey Third Team.
