= Anne Cherkowski =

Canadian ice hockey player (born 2002)

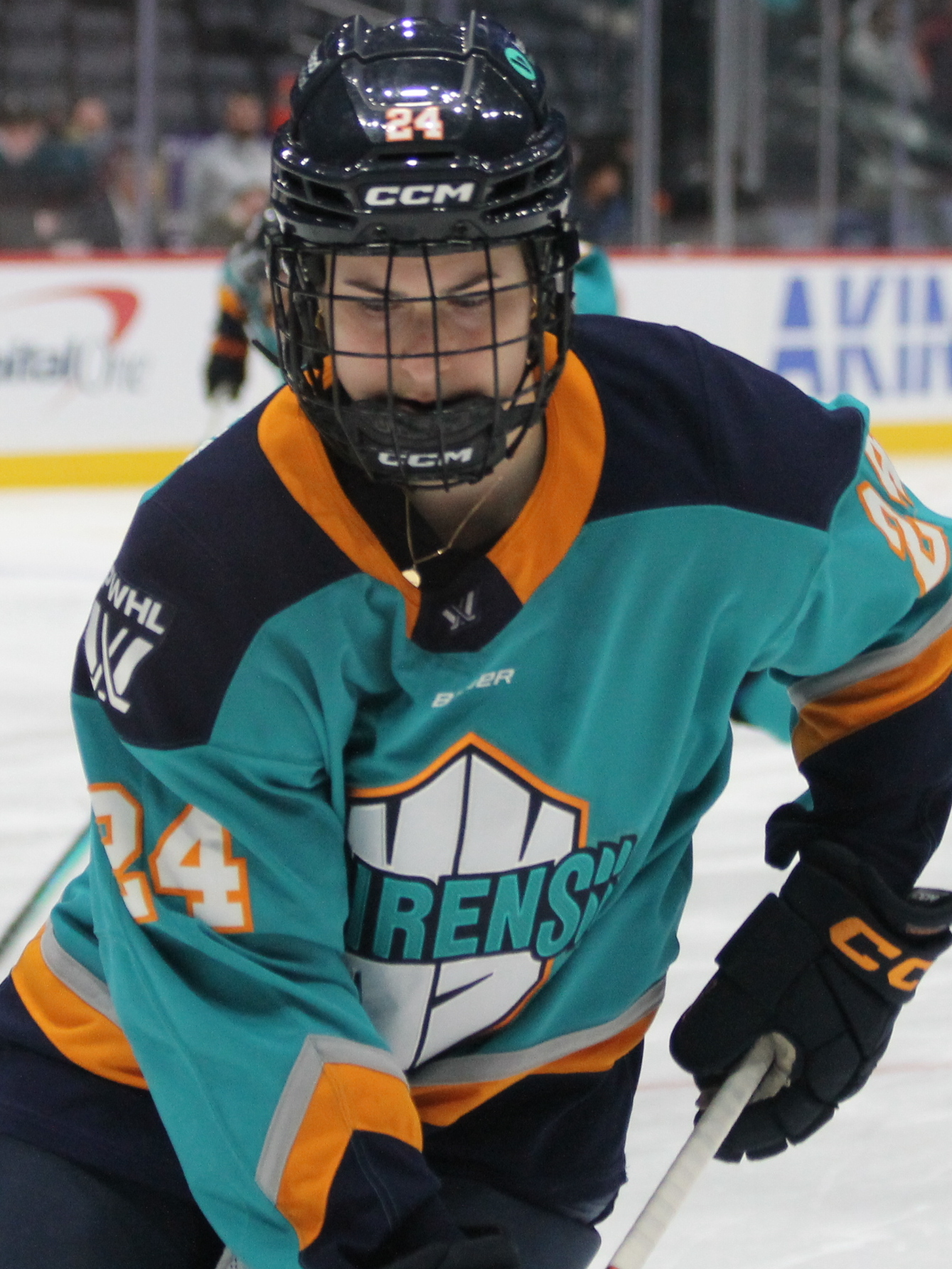
- Cherkowski with the New York Sirens in 2026
- Born: July 6, 2002 (age 24) Coldstream, British Columbia, Canada
- Height: 5 ft 6 in (168 cm)
- Position: Forward
- Shoots: Right
- PWHL team Former teams: San Jose Sea Lions; New York Sirens
- Playing career: 2020–present

Anne Cherkowski (born July 6, 2002) is a Canadian professional ice hockey forward for the San Jose Sea Lions of the Professional Women's Hockey League (PWHL). She played college ice hockey at Minnesota and Clarkson.

== Early life ==
Cherkowski was born to Kevin and Sabre Cherkowski, and has a brother, Nicholas. She attended George Elliot Secondary School and played ice hockey for Pursuit of Excellence Academy and won consecutive CSSHL championships in grades 10 and 11. During her four years at Pursuit of Excellence she recorded 85 goals and 80 assists in 85 regular season games. She was named CSSHL Female Prep Freshman of the Year in 2018. On July 7, 2020, she committed to play college ice hockey at Minnesota.

== Playing career ==
=== College ===
Cherkowski began her collegiate career for Minnesota during the 2020–21 season, where she recorded one goal and five assists in 13 games. She scored her first career goal on November 27, 2020, in a game against Minnesota Duluth. Following the season she transferred to Clarkson.

During the 2021–22 season, in her sophomore year, she recorded four goals and six assists in 35 games. During the 2022–23 NCAA season, in her junior year, she recorded 23 goals and 29 assists in 40 games. She led the team in goals and ranked second with 52 points. During the 2023–24 season, in her senior year, she recorded 15 goals and 19 assists in 40 games.

During the 2024–25 season, as a graduate student, she recorded 17 goals and 28 assists in 40 games. Following the season she was named to the ECAC All-First Team. During conference play she tied for the lead in points. She finished her collegiate career with 60 goals and 87 assists in 168 games.

=== Professional ===
On June 24, 2025, Cherkowski was drafted in the second round, ninth overall, by the New York Sirens in the 2025 PWHL Draft. On September 12, 2025, she signed a three-year contract with the Sirens. During the 2025–26 season, in her rookie year, she recorded two goals and seven assists in 28 games.

During the league's expansion to 12 teams ahead of the 2026–27 season, she was left unprotected by the Sirens and signed a two-year contract with the San Jose Sea Lions on June 6, 2026.

== International play ==
Medal record

Representing Canada

Ice hockey

World U18 Championship
Gold medal – first place	2019 Japan	
Silver medal – second place	2020 Slovakia	

On December 17, 2018, Cherkowski was selected to represent Canada at the 2019 IIHF World Women's U18 Championship. During the tournament she recorded two goals and assist in five games and won a gold medal. During the gold medal game against the United States, she scored the game-tying goal to force overtime. She again represented Canada at the 2020 IIHF World Women's U18 Championship where she recorded one goal and two assists in five games and won a silver medal.

== Career statistics ==
=== Regular season and playoffs ===
			Regular season					Playoffs
Season	Team	League	GP	G	A	Pts	PIM	GP	G	A	Pts	PIM
2020–21	University of Minnesota	WCHA	13	1	5	6	6	—	—	—	—	—
2021–22	Clarkson University	ECAC	34	4	6	10	21	—	—	—	—	—
2022–23	Clarkson University	ECAC	40	23	29	52	34	—	—	—	—	—
2023–24	Clarkson University	ECAC	40	15	19	34	8	—	—	—	—	—
2024–25	Clarkson University	ECAC	40	17	28	45	21	—	—	—	—	—
2025–26	New York Sirens	PWHL	28	2	7	9	2	—	—	—	—	—
PWHL totals			28	2	7	9	2	—	—	—	—	—

=== International ===
Year	Team	Event	Result	GP	G	A	Pts	PIM
2019	Canada	U18	1st place, gold medalist(s)	5	2	1	3	2
2020	Canada	U18	2nd place, silver medalist(s)	5	1	2	3	2
Junior totals				10	3	3	6	4

== Awards and honours ==
Honours	Year
College
ECAC All-First Team	2025
