= Caroline Spies =

Swiss ice hockey goaltender

- Born: 2 July 2002 (age 24) Zwingen, Switzerland
- Height: 1.69 m (5 ft 7 in)
- Weight: 62 kg (137 lb; 9 st 11 lb)
- Position: Goaltender
- Catches: Left
- U20-Top team SWHL B team Former teams: EHC Basel U20; SC Langenthal; EV Bomo Thun
- National team: Switzerland
- Playing career: 2017–present

Caroline Spies (born 2 July 2002) is a Swiss ice hockey goaltender and member of the Swiss national ice hockey team, currently playing in the Swiss Women's Hockey League B (SWHL B) with the SC Langenthal Damen and in the Swiss U20-Top with the under-20 (U20) junior team of EHC Basel.

Spies represented Switzerland at the 2021 IIHF Women's World Championship, where she served as third goaltender behind starters Andrea Brändli and Saskia Maurer. As a junior player with the Swiss national under-18 team, she participated in the IIHF Women's U18 World Championships in 2018, 2019, and 2020.
