= 2021 IIHF Women's World Championship final =

Played at WinSport Arena in Calgary, Alberta

	1	2	3	OT	Total
United States	2	0	0	0	2
Canada	0	2	0	1	3
- Date: 31 August 2021
- Arena: WinSport Arena
- City: Calgary

The 2021 IIHF Women's World Championship final was played on 31 August 2021, at WinSport Arena in Calgary, Canada. Canada defeated the United States 3–2 in overtime to win their 11th title and first since 2012, ending team U.S. streak of five consecutive gold medals.

== Background ==
Since the first IIHF Women's World Championship in 1990 and the first women's tournament at the Winter Olympics in 1998, the American and Canadian national teams have played in the finals on all occasions except for the 2006 Winter Olympics, when Sweden played Canada, and the 2019 IIHF Women's World Championship, where Finland played the United States.

== Road to the final ==
United States
Round
Canada
Opponent
Result
Preliminary round
Opponent
Result
Switzerland
3–0
Game 1
Finland
5–3
Finland
3–0
Game 2
ROC
5–1
ROC
6–0
Game 3
Switzerland
5–0
Canada
1–5
Game 4
United States
5–1
Both teams played in Group A.

Pos	Team	Pld	W	OTW	OTL	L	GF	GA	GD	Pts	Qualification
1	Canada (H)	4	4	0	0	0	20	5	+15	12	Quarterfinals
2	United States	4	3	0	0	1	13	5	+8	9	Quarterfinals
3	Finland	4	2	0	0	2	13	8	+5	6	Quarterfinals
4	ROC	4	1	0	0	3	4	16	−12	3	Quarterfinals
5	Switzerland	4	0	0	0	4	1	17	−16	0	Quarterfinals

Source: IIHF
Rules for classification: 1) points; 2) head-to-head points; 3) head-to-head goal difference; 4) head-to-head number of goals scored; 5) result against closest best-ranked team outside tied teams; 6) result against second-best ranked team outside tied teams; 7) seeding before tournament.
(H) Host
Opponent
Result
Playoff
Opponent
Result
Japan
10–2
Quarterfinals
Germany
7–0
Finland
3–0
Semifinals
Switzerland
4–0

== Match ==
31 August 2021; 17:30	Canada	3–2 OT (0–2, 2–0, 0–0) (OT: 1–0)	United States	WinSport Arena, Calgary

Game reference

Ann-Renée Desbiens
Goalies
Nicole Hensley
Referees:
(Finland) Anniina Nurmi
(Switzerland) Anna Wiegand
Linesmen:
(Sweden) Anna Hammar
(Austria) Julia Kainberger

	0–1	09:55 – Carpenter (Kessel, Eden)
	0–2	12:35 – Carpenter (Stecklein, Pannek) (PP)
Jenner (Poulin, Fillier) (PP) – 24:13	1–2
Rattray (Larocque, Jenner) – 26:42	2–2
Poulin (Jenner, Larocque) – 67:22	3–2

10 min
Penalties
8 min
32
Shots
25
