= Gabrielle Ariano-Lortie =

Canadian ice hockey referee

- Occupation: Referee
- Organization: Hockey Canada

Gabrielle Ariano-Lortie is a Canadian ice hockey referee. She notably served as a referee at the 2018 Winter Olympics, including the first Unified Korean national team match in Olympic history. She made her IIHF debut at the 2015 IIHF Women's World Championship. She was nominated for an honour at the 2020 Gala SportsQuébec and was named Hockey Québec referee of the month in November 2020.

Outside of hockey, she works as an intensive care nurse at the Montreal Heart Institute.
