= 2021 IIHF Women's World Championship =

IIHF top division international women's ice hockey tournament held in 2021

Tournament details
- Host country: Canada
- Venue: 1 (in 1 host city)
- Dates: 20–31 August
- Opened by: Mary Simon
- Teams: 10

Final positions
- Champions: Canada (11th title)
- Runners-up: United States
- Third place: Finland
- Fourth place: Switzerland

Tournament statistics
- Games played: 31
- Goals scored: 145 (4.68 per game)
- Attendance: 0 (0 per game)
- Scoring leader: (Canada) Mélodie Daoust (12 points)

Awards
- MVP: (Canada) Mélodie Daoust

Official website
- Official homepage

The 2021 IIHF Women's World Championship was the 20th edition of the Top Division of the Women's Ice Hockey World Championship organized by the International Ice Hockey Federation (IIHF). The tournament was contested in Calgary, Alberta, from 20 to 31 August 2021, at WinSport Arena. It was originally scheduled to be contested in Halifax and Truro, Nova Scotia, Canada. It was the 20th edition of the IIHF Women's World Championship Top Division tournament.

No divisional promotion and relegation occurred after this tournament as the Division I tournament was cancelled due to the COVID-19 pandemic. Originally scheduled from 7 to 17 April, the tournament was postponed to 6 to 16 May 2021 on 4 March. On 21 April 2021, the Province of Nova Scotia informed Hockey Canada and the IIHF that the tournament had been cancelled at the recommendation of Premier Iain Rankin "due to concerns over safety risks associated with COVID-19."

The IIHF and Hockey Canada released a joint statement pledging to explore all avenues for hosting the event in a different Canadian city during the summer of 2021. IIHF President René Fasel emphasized, "This does not mean that we will not have a Women's World Championship in 2021. We owe it to every single player that was looking forward to getting back on the ice after such a difficult year that we do everything possible to ensure this tournament can be moved to new dates and played this year." On 30 April 2021, the IIHF announced that the tournament would take place between 20 and 31 August 2021. On 2 June 2021, the venue was identified as WinSport Arena at Canada Olympic Park in Calgary.

The tournament was played behind closed doors.

Canada won the tournament for the record-extending eleventh time after defeating the United States in the final 3-2 in overtime. Finland captured bronze, by winning against Switzerland.

== Participating teams ==
Group A

- United States
- Canada Hosts
- Finland
- ROC^{1}
- Switzerland

Group B

- Czech Republic
- Germany
- Japan
- Hungary – Promoted from Division I Group A in 2019 ^{2}
- Denmark – Promoted from Division I Group A in 2019 ^{2}

^{1} Pursuant to a December 2020 ruling by the Court of Arbitration for Sport on doping sanctions, Russian athletes and teams are prohibited from competing under the Russian flag or using the Russian national anthem at any Olympic Games or world championships through 16 December 2022, and must compete as "neutral athlete[s]." For IIHF tournaments, the Russian team will use the logo of the Russian Olympic Committee (ROC) and play under the name "ROC".

^{2} No divisional promotion and relegation occurred from 2020 as most tournaments were cancelled due to the COVID-19 pandemic.

== Rosters ==
Each team's roster must comprised a minimum of fifteen skaters (forwards and defencemen) and two goaltenders, and "due to the special situation with the COVID-19 pandemic and safety rules including no players being allowed to join late, the roster size for the tournament was exceptionally increased [from the standard 20 skaters and 3 goaltenders] to 25 players." All ten participating nations, through the confirmation of their respective national associations, were required to submit a "Long List" roster no later than two weeks before the start of the tournament. Final rosters will be submitted on 20 August 2021, one day before the tournament begins, but as no players can be added after arriving in Canada, rosters were effectively set when teams landed in Calgary on 11 August 2021.

== Match officials ==
Twelve referees and ten linesmen were selected for the tournament.

Referees	Linesmen
(Canada) Cianna Lieffers; (Canada) Elizabeth Mantha; (Canada) Shauna Neary; (Canada) Lacey Senuk; (Finland) Anniina Nurmi; (Russia) Daria Ermak; (Sweden) Maria Furberg; (Switzerland) Anna Wiegand; (United States) Kelly Cooke; (United States) Chelsea Rapin; (United States) Jestina Vichorek; (United States) Mackenzie Welter	(Austria) Julia Kainberger; (Canada) Alexandra Blair; (Canada) Jessica Chartrand; (Canada) Justine Todd; (Finland) Jenni Heikkinen; (Russia) Diana Mokhova; (Sweden) Anna Hammar; (United States) Kendall Hanley; (United States) Jacqueline Spresser; (United States) Sara Strong

== Preliminary round ==
All times are local (UTC−6).

=== Group A ===
Pos	Team	Pld	W	OTW	OTL	L	GF	GA	GD	Pts	Qualification
1	Canada (H)	4	4	0	0	0	20	5	+15	12	Quarterfinals
2	United States	4	3	0	0	1	13	5	+8	9	Quarterfinals
3	Finland	4	2	0	0	2	13	8	+5	6	Quarterfinals
4	ROC	4	1	0	0	3	4	16	−12	3	Quarterfinals
5	Switzerland	4	0	0	0	4	1	17	−16	0	Quarterfinals

Source: IIHF
Rules for classification: 1) points; 2) head-to-head points; 3) head-to-head goal difference; 4) head-to-head number of goals scored; 5) result against closest best-ranked team outside tied teams; 6) result against second-best ranked team outside tied teams; 7) seeding before tournament.
(H) Host

20 August 2021; 16:00	Canada	5–3 (0–2, 2–0, 3–1)	Finland	WinSport Arena, Calgary

Game reference

Ann-Renée Desbiens
Goalies
Anni Keisala
Referees:
(Russia) Daria Ermak
(United States) Chelsea Rapin
Linesmen:
(Russia) Diana Mokhova
(United States) Sara Strong

	0–1	02:25 – Laitinen (Sundelin)
	0–2	06:05 – Tuominen (Hiirikoski) (PP2)
Rattray (Spooner) – 34:41	1–2
Poulin (Thompson, Ambrose) – 35:01	2–2
Ambrose (Jenner, Thompson) – 42:41	3–2
	3–3	47:13 – Holopainen (Lindstedt)
Fillier (Daoust, Spooner) – 47:38	4–3
Jenner (Nurse) (ENG) – 59:17	5–3

10 min
Penalties
8 min
44
Shots
11

20 August 2021; 19:30	Switzerland	0–3 (0–1, 0–2, 0–0)	United States	WinSport Arena, Calgary

Game reference

Andrea Brändli
Goalies
Alex Cavallini
Referees:
(Canada) Elizabeth Mantha
(Canada) Shauna Neary
Linesmen:
(Canada) Jessica Chartrand
(Austria) Julia Kainberger

0–1	04:29 – Decker (Coyne Schofield)
0–2	24:08 – Coyne Schofield (Decker)
0–3	38:24 – Zumwinkle (Dunne, Bozek)

10 min
Penalties
6 min
10
Shots
58

21 August 2021; 16:00	ROC	3–1 (0–1, 2–0, 1–0)	Switzerland	WinSport Arena, Calgary

Game reference

Valeria Merkusheva
Goalies
Saskia Maurer
Referees:
(United States) Chelsea Rapin
(United States) Jestina Vichorek
Linesmen:
(United States) Kendall Hanley
(Canada) Justine Todd

	0–1	10:15 – Müller (Stalder, Staenz)
Pavlova (Shibanova, Sosina) (PP) – 30:49	1–1
Kulishova (Bratishcheva, Pirogova) – 31:03	2–1
Batalova (Kadirova, Vafina) – 57:16	3–1

14 min
Penalties
14 min
34
Shots
20

22 August 2021; 16:00	Canada	5–1 (0–0, 3–0, 2–1)	ROC	WinSport Arena, Calgary

Game reference

Ann-Renée Desbiens
Goalies
Nadezhda Morozova
Anna Prugova
Referees:
(United States) Kelly Cooke
(United States) Mackenzie Welter
Linesmen:
(Sweden) Anna Hammar
(United States) Jacqueline Spresser

Fillier – 27:29	1–0
Shelton (Jenner, Bell) – 29:11	2–0
Ambrose (Thompson, Poulin) – 33:48	3–0
Daoust (Spooner, Nurse) – 42:00	4–0
Johnston (Clark, Fast) – 54:09	5–0
	5–1	59:59 – Sosina (PP)

10 min
Penalties
10 min
62
Shots
7

22 August 2021; 19:30	Finland	0–3 (0–1, 0–1, 0–1)	United States	WinSport Arena, Calgary

Game reference

Meeri Räisänen
Goalies
Nicole Hensley
Referees:
(Canada) Elizabeth Mantha
(Canada) Lacey Senuk
Linesmen:
(Canada) Jessica Chartrand
(Canada) Justine Todd

0–1	14:31 – Zumwinkle (Scamurra)
0–2	26:25 – Pannek (Dunne)
0–3	53:02 – Knight (Stecklein, Coyne Schofield)

8 min
Penalties
12 min
10
Shots
39

24 August 2021; 12:00	United States	6–0 (1–0, 2–0, 3–0)	ROC	WinSport Arena, Calgary

Game reference

Alex Cavallini
Goalies
Anna Prugova
Valeria Merkusheva
Referees:
(Canada) Cianna Lieffers
(Switzerland) Anna Wiegand
Linesmen:
(Finland) Jenni Heikkinen
(Austria) Julia Kainberger

Curl (Zumwinkle, Keller) – 11:50	1–0
Knight (Decker) – 23:17	2–0
Stecklein (Pannek) – 37:25	3–0
Pannek (Harmon, Stecklein) (PP) – 42:45	4–0
Murphy (Keller) (PP) – 46:13	5–0
Compher (Zumwinkle, Bozek) – 47:53	6–0

4 min
Penalties
18 min
55
Shots
11

24 August 2021; 16:00	Switzerland	0–5 (0–0, 0–4, 0–1)	Canada	WinSport Arena, Calgary

Game reference

Andrea Brändli
Saskia Maurer
Goalies
Emerance Maschmeyer
Referees:
(United States) Kelly Cooke
(Finland) Anniina Nurmi
Linesmen:
(Sweden) Anna Hammar
(United States) Sara Strong

0–1	25:04 – Clark (Turnbull) (SH)
0–2	29:38 – Bourbonnais (Rattray, Poulin)
0–3	29:55 – Spooner (Fast, Daoust)
0–4	36:34 – Daoust (Ambrose, Fillier)
0–5	41:01 – Spooner (Shelton, Daoust)

12 min
Penalties
12 min
12
Shots
63

25 August 2021; 12:00	ROC	0–4 (0–3, 0–0, 0–1)	Finland	WinSport Arena, Calgary

Game reference

Valeria Merkusheva
Nadezhda Morozova
Goalies
Anni Keisala
Referees:
(Canada) Elizabeth Mantha
(United States) Chelsea Rapin
Linesmen:
(United States) Kendall Hanley
(Canada) Justine Todd

0–1	08:07 – Tapani (Karvinen, Savolainen)
0–2	12:33 – Nieminen (Karvinen, Tapani)
0–3	15:21 – Nylund (Tulus)
0–4	44:50 – Nieminen

6 min
Penalties
4 min
13
Shots
18

26 August 2021; 12:00	Finland	6–0 (4–0, 1–0, 1–0)	Switzerland	WinSport Arena, Calgary

Game reference

Meeri Räisänen
Goalies
Andrea Brändli
Saskia Maurer
Referees:
(Sweden) Maria Furberg
(Canada) Cianna Lieffers
Linesmen:
(Austria) Julia Kainberger
(United States) Sara Strong

Tapani (Nieminen, Karvinen) (PP) – 04:38	1–0
Nieminen (Tulus) (SH) – 08:54	2–0
Nieminen (Karvinen) – 10:26	3–0
Nieminen (Karvinen, Hiirikoski) – 14:49	4–0
Tapani (Hiirikoski, Tulus) (PP) – 36:39	5–0
Vainikka (Holopainen) – 41:26	6–0

4 min
Penalties
10 min
37
Shots
9

26 August 2021; 16:00	United States	1–5 (0–2, 0–3, 1–0)	Canada	WinSport Arena, Calgary

Game reference

Alex Cavallini
Nicole Hensley
Goalies
Ann-Renée Desbiens
Referees:
(United States) Kelly Cooke
(Canada) Lacey Senuk
Linesmen:
(Canada) Alexandra Blair
(United States) Jacqueline Spresser

	0–1	07:13 – Daoust (Spooner, Larocque)
	0–2	13:50 – Fast (Clark, Daoust)
	0–3	24:18 – Rattray (Jenner)
	0–4	27:16 – Rattray (Jenner)
	0–5	30:36 – Nurse (SH)
Stecklein (Compher) – 42:44	1–5

10 min
Penalties
12 min
23
Shots
27

=== Group B ===
Pos	Team	Pld	W	OTW	OTL	L	GF	GA	GD	Pts	Qualification
1	Czech Republic	4	4	0	0	0	16	3	+13	12	Quarterfinals
2	Japan	4	3	0	0	1	7	6	+1	9	Quarterfinals
3	Germany	4	2	0	0	2	7	5	+2	6	Quarterfinals
4	Hungary	4	1	0	0	3	8	12	−4	3 (Note: No divisional relegation occurred after this tournament as the Division I tournament was cancelled due to the COVID-19 pandemic.)	Eliminated
5	Denmark	4	0	0	0	4	3	15	−12	0	Eliminated

Source: IIHF
Rules for classification: 1) points; 2) head-to-head points; 3) head-to-head goal difference; 4) head-to-head number of goals scored; 5) result against closest best-ranked team outside tied teams; 6) result against second-best ranked team outside tied teams; 7) seeding before tournament.
Notes:

20 August 2021; 12:00	Czech Republic	6–1 (3–1, 0–0, 3–0)	Denmark	WinSport Arena, Calgary

Game reference

Klára Peslarová
Goalies
Lisa Jensen
Referees:
(Finland) Anniina Nurmi
(Switzerland) Anna Wiegand
Linesmen:
(Canada) Alexandra Blair
(United States) Jacqueline Spresser

Mills (Hymlarová, Horálková) (PP) – 06:05	1–0
Lásková (Mrázová) – 13:00	2–0
	2–1	14:41 – Persson (Jakobsen, Østergaard) (PP)
Přibylová (Horálková, Mills) (PP) – 17:34	3–1
Mills (Přibylová, Horálková) (PP) – 40:22	4–1
Pátková (Mazancová, Pejšová) – 44:00	5–1
Mills (Horálková) – 57:16	6–1

4 min
Penalties
14 min
34
Shots
9

21 August 2021; 12:00	Germany	3–0 (2–0, 0–0, 1–0)	Hungary	WinSport Arena, Calgary

Game reference

Jennifer Harß
Goalies
Anikó Németh
Referees:
(Sweden) Maria Furberg
(Canada) Cianna Lieffers
Linesmen:
(Canada) Alexandra Blair
(Finland) Jenni Heikkinen

Christof (Weidenfelder) – 12:55	1–0
Christof (Jobst-Smith, T. Eisenschmid) (PP) – 13:53	2–0
Zorn (Spielberger) – 52:42	3–0

10 min
Penalties
8 min
26
Shots
19

21 August 2021; 19:30	Denmark	0–1 (0–0, 0–1, 0–0)	Japan	WinSport Arena, Calgary

Game reference
Cassandra Repstock-Romme	Goalies	Nana Fujimoto	Referees: (Canada) Lacey Senuk (United States) Mackenzie Welter; Linesmen: (Sweden) Anna Hammar (Austria) Julia Kainberger
0–1 / 24:25 – H. Yamashita (H. Toko, A. Toko)			Referees: (Canada) Lacey Senuk (United States) Mackenzie Welter; Linesmen: (Sweden) Anna Hammar (Austria) Julia Kainberger
14 min	Penalties	14 min	Referees: (Canada) Lacey Senuk (United States) Mackenzie Welter; Linesmen: (Sweden) Anna Hammar (Austria) Julia Kainberger
26	Shots	28	Referees: (Canada) Lacey Senuk (United States) Mackenzie Welter; Linesmen: (Sweden) Anna Hammar (Austria) Julia Kainberger

22 August 2021; 12:00	Hungary	2–4 (0–2, 1–2, 1–0)	Czech Republic	WinSport Arena, Calgary

Game reference

Zsófia Tóth
Goalies
Klára Peslarová
Referees:
(United States) Jestina Vichorek
(Switzerland) Anna Wiegand
Linesmen:
(United States) Kendall Hanley
(United States) Sara Strong

	0–1	03:42 – Radová (Neubauerová)
	0–2	06:56 – Pejšová (Vanišová, Křížová)
	0–3	23:18 – Přibylová (Vanišová)
	0–4	24:36 – Křížová (Kolowratová) (PP)
Dabasi (Jókai-Szilágyi, Gasparics) – 39:59	1–4
Gasparics – 59:22	2–4

14 min
Penalties
22 min
13
Shots
36

23 August 2021; 12:00	Germany	3–1 (1–0, 2–0, 0–1)	Denmark	WinSport Arena, Calgary

Game reference

Jennifer Harß
Goalies
Cassandra Repstock-Romme
Referees:
(United States) Kelly Cooke
(Russia) Daria Ermak
Linesmen:
(Canada) Alexandra Blair
(Canada) Jessica Chartrand

Zorn (Karpf) – 12:30	1–0
Schiefer (Rothemund, Düsterhöft) – 28:08	2–0
Wagner (Reich) – 31:17	3–0
	3–1	47:18 – Jakobsen (Weis)

2 min
Penalties
4 min
26
Shots
22

23 August 2021; 16:00	Japan	0–4 (0–1, 0–2, 0–1)	Czech Republic	WinSport Arena, Calgary

Game reference

Nana Fujimoto
Goalies
Klára Peslarová
Referees:
(Canada) Shauna Neary
(United States) Mackenzie Welter
Linesmen:
(Russia) Diana Mokhova
(Canada) Justine Todd

0–1	08:11 – Lásková (Neubauerová, Křížová)
0–2	23:02 – Neubauerová (Vanišová)
0–3	31:43 – Mills (Přibylová) (PP)
0–4	41:17 – Mrázová (Mlýnková)

4 min
Penalties
6 min
24
Shots
20

24 August 2021; 19:30	Hungary	1–4 (0–1, 1–1, 0–2)	Japan	WinSport Arena, Calgary

Game reference

Anikó Németh
Goalies
Nana Fujimoto
Referees:
(Russia) Daria Ermak
(United States) Chelsea Rapin
Linesmen:
(United States) Kendall Hanley
(United States) Jacqueline Spresser

	0–1	19:35 – Ak. Shiga (H. Toko, Ao. Shiga) (PP)
Gasparics (Knee, Odnoga) (PP) – 23:16	1–1
	1–2	27:30 – Ukita (H. Toko, A. Toko) (PP2)
	1–3	50:23 – Yoneyama (Hosoyamada, Koike) (PP)
	1–4	51:34 – Kubo (Taka, Miura)

10 min
Penalties
12 min
25
Shots
29

25 August 2021; 16:00	Czech Republic	2–0 (0–0, 1–0, 1–0)	Germany	WinSport Arena, Calgary

Game reference
Klára Peslarová	Goalies	Franziska Albl	Referees: (Sweden) Maria Furberg (Canada) Lacey Senuk; Linesmen: (Canada) Jessica Chartrand (Russia) Diana Mokhova
Lásková (Neubauerová, Mrázová) – 24:28 / 1–0; Lásková (Mrázová, Neubauerová) – 49:09 / 2–0			Referees: (Sweden) Maria Furberg (Canada) Lacey Senuk; Linesmen: (Canada) Jessica Chartrand (Russia) Diana Mokhova
12 min	Penalties	12 min	Referees: (Sweden) Maria Furberg (Canada) Lacey Senuk; Linesmen: (Canada) Jessica Chartrand (Russia) Diana Mokhova
29	Shots	12	Referees: (Sweden) Maria Furberg (Canada) Lacey Senuk; Linesmen: (Canada) Jessica Chartrand (Russia) Diana Mokhova

25 August 2021; 19:30	Denmark	1–5 (0–2, 1–2, 0–1)	Hungary	WinSport Arena, Calgary

Game reference

Emma-Sofie Nordström
Goalies
Anikó Németh
Referees:
(Canada) Shauna Neary
(United States) Jestina Vichorek
Linesmen:
(Sweden) Anna Hammar
(Finland) Jenni Heikkinen

	0–1	14:45 – Jókai-Szilágyi (Knee) (PP2)
	0–2	17:49 – Gowie
	0–3	20:22 – Gasparics (Jókai-Szilágyi, Knee) (PP)
Jakobsen (SH) – 25:16	1–3
	1–4	39:15 – Gowie (B. Németh, Kreisz) (PP)
	1–5	58:36 – Gasparics (Jókai-Szilágyi, B. Németh)

16 min
Penalties
8 min
11
Shots
18

26 August 2021; 19:30	Japan	2–1 (0–1, 2–0, 0–0)	Germany	WinSport Arena, Calgary

Game reference

Nana Fujimoto
Goalies
Jennifer Harß
Referees:
(Finland) Anniina Nurmi
(Switzerland) Anna Wiegand
Linesmen:
(Finland) Jenni Heikkinen
(Russia) Diana Mokhova

	0–1	14:52 – Spielberger (Zorn)
Kubo (M. Fujimoto) – 22:13	1–1
H. Yamashita (Hosoyamada) – 29:47	2–1

8 min
Penalties
2 min
21
Shots
19

== Knockout stage ==
=== Bracket ===
There was a re-seeding after the quarterfinals.

Rank	Team	Grp	Pos	Pts	GD	GF	Seed
1	Canada	A	1	12	+15	20	1
2	United States	A	2	9	+8	13	2
3	Finland	A	3	6	+5	13	3
4	ROC	A	4	3	−12	4	4
5	Switzerland	A	5	0	−16	1	5
6	Czech Republic	B	1	12	+13	16	7
7	Japan	B	2	9	+1	7	6
8	Germany	B	3	6	+2	7	8

Quarter-finals
28 August
Canada	7
Germany	0
28 August
United States	10
Japan	2
28 August
Finland	1
Czech Republic	0
28 August
ROC	2
Switzerland (OT)	3

Semi-finals
30 August
Canada	4
Switzerland	0
30 August
United States	3
Finland	0

Final
31 August
Canada (OT)	3
United States	2
Third place
31 August
Finland	3
Switzerland	1

=== Quarterfinals ===
28 August 2021; 10:00	ROC	2–3 OT (2–0, 0–0, 0–2) (OT: 0–1)	Switzerland	WinSport Arena, Calgary

Game reference

Valeria Merkusheva
Goalies
Andrea Brändli
Saskia Maurer
Referees:
(Sweden) Maria Furberg
(United States) Mackenzie Welter
Linesmen:
(Canada) Alexandra Blair
(Canada) Justine Todd

Rodnova (Ganeyeva, Kadirova) – 01:18	1–0
Markova (Korzhakova, Rodnova) (EA) – 08:32	2–0
	2–1	49:30 – Raselli (Rüegg, Ryhner)
	2–2	57:44 – Staenz (Christen) (PP, EA)
	2–3	65:29 – Zimmermann (Leemann)

10 min
Penalties
8 min
31
Shots
30

28 August 2021; 13:30	United States	10–2 (5–2, 2–0, 3–0)	Japan	WinSport Arena, Calgary

Game reference

Alex Cavallini
Nicole Hensley
Goalies
Nana Fujimoto
Akane Konishi
Referees:
(Russia) Daria Ermak
(Finland) Anniina Nurmi
Linesmen:
(Canada) Jessica Chartrand
(Russia) Diana Mokhova

Carpenter (Kessel, Barnes) – 03:10	1–0
Knight (Coyne Schofield, Decker) – 03:41	2–0
	2–1	10:58 – Ak. Shiga (H. Toko, Ukita)
Zumwinkle (Kessel) – 14:32	3–1
Carpenter (Eden, Stecklein) – 15:07	4–1
Keller (Compher, Barnes) – 17:33	5–1
	5–2	18:53 – Ak. Shiga (Taka)
Decker (Knight, Keller) – 25:43	6–2
Harvey (Cameranesi) – 28:21	7–2
Zumwinkle – 42:00	8–2
Knight (Harvey) – 43:44	9–2
Cameranesi (Roque, Harvey) - 44:39	10–2

6 min
Penalties
0 min
61
Shots
12

28 August 2021; 17:00	Canada	7–0 (3–0, 2–0, 2–0)	Germany	WinSport Arena, Calgary

Game reference

Emerance Maschmeyer
Goalies
Franziska Albl
Sandra Abstreiter
Referees:
(United States) Chelsea Rapin
(Switzerland) Anna Wiegand
Linesmen:
(United States) Kendall Hanley
(United States) Jacqueline Spresser

Bell (Daoust) – 01:29	1–0
Spooner (Fillier) – 03:54	2–0
Jenner (Daoust) – 15:47	3–0
Spooner (Shelton (Bell) – 28:01	4–0
Poulin (Bach) – 35:31	5–0
Daoust (Poulin) (PP) – 43:10	6–0
Fillier (Spooner) – 53:34	7–0

4 min
Penalties
29 min
52
Shots
3

28 August 2021; 20:30	Finland	1–0 (0–0, 1–0, 0–0)	Czech Republic	WinSport Arena, Calgary

Game reference
Anni Keisala	Goalies	Klára Peslarová	Referees: (Canada) Cianna Lieffers (Canada) Elizabeth Mantha; Linesmen: (Austria) Julia Kainberger (United States) Sara Strong
Vanhanen – 35:01 / 1–0			Referees: (Canada) Cianna Lieffers (Canada) Elizabeth Mantha; Linesmen: (Austria) Julia Kainberger (United States) Sara Strong
8 min	Penalties	4 min	Referees: (Canada) Cianna Lieffers (Canada) Elizabeth Mantha; Linesmen: (Austria) Julia Kainberger (United States) Sara Strong
20	Shots	29	Referees: (Canada) Cianna Lieffers (Canada) Elizabeth Mantha; Linesmen: (Austria) Julia Kainberger (United States) Sara Strong

=== 5th–8th place placement games ===
29 August 2021; 13:00	ROC	3–2 (0–0, 1–2, 2–0)	Germany	WinSport Arena, Calgary

Game reference

Nadezhda Morozova
Valeria Merkusheva
Goalies
Franziska Albl
Referees:
(United States) Kelly Cooke
(Canada) Shauna Neary
Linesmen:
(Canada) Alexandra Blair
(Canada) Jessica Chartrand

	0–1	23:49 – N. Eisenschmid (T. Eisenschmid)
Savonina (Kulishova, Falyakhova) – 26:01	1–1
	1–2	37:22 – Spielberger (Reich, Karpf)
Korzhakova (Goncharenko, Rodnova) – 41:10	2–2
Bratisheva (Kadirova, Ganeyeva) – 44:18	3–2

12 min
Penalties
4 min
26
Shots
26

29 August 2021; 17:00	Czech Republic	2–3 (0–1, 1–1, 1–1)	Japan	WinSport Arena, Calgary

Game reference

Klára Peslarová
Goalies
Nana Fujimoto
Referees:
(Russia) Daria Ermak
(Canada) Lacey Senuk
Linesmen:
(Finland) Jenni Heikkinen
(Russia) Diana Mokhova

	0–1	13:50 – Kubo (Ao. Shiga, A. Toko) (PP)
Mills (Tejralová, Křížová) – 24:07	1–1
	1–2	36:24 – Ukita (Koike, Hosoyamada) (PP)
	1–3	58:02 – Ak. Shiga
Pejšová (Mills, Přibylová) (EA) – 58:45	2–3

12 min
Penalties
4 min
33
Shots
27

=== Semifinals ===
30 August 2021; 13:00	United States	3–0 (0–0, 2–0, 1–0)	Finland	WinSport Arena, Calgary

Game reference

Nicole Hensley
Goalies
Anni Keisala
Referees:
(Canada) Cianna Lieffers
(Canada) Elizabeth Mantha
Linesmen:
(Sweden) Anna Hammar
(Canada) Justine Todd

Carpenter (Stecklein, Kessel) – 23:23	1–0
Murphy (Keller, Barnes) – 35:17	2–0
Coyne (Pannek) (ENG) – 57:07	3–0

8 min
Penalties
4 min
33
Shots
14

30 August 2021; 17:00	Canada	4–0 (2–0, 1–0, 1–0)	Switzerland	WinSport Arena, Calgary

Game reference

Ann-Renée Desbiens
Goalies
Andrea Brändli
Referees:
(United States) Chelsea Rapin
(United States) Mackenzie Welter
Linesmen:
(Finland) Jenni Heikkinen
(United States) Jacqueline Spresser

Fast (Jenner, Poulin) – 05:14	1–0
Daoust (Fast, Larocque) – 06:52	2–0
Daoust (Poulin, Ambrose) (PP) – 25:32	3–0
Johnston (Bach, Thompson) (PP) – 56:58	4–0

4 min
Penalties
10 min
65
Shots
10

=== Fifth place game ===
31 August 2021; 10:00	ROC	2–0 (1–0, 0–0, 1–0)	Japan	WinSport Arena, Calgary

Game reference
Valeria Merkusheva	Goalies	Nana Fujimoto	Referees: (Sweden) Maria Furberg (United States) Jestina Vichorek; Linesmen: (Canada) Jessica Chartrand (United States) Sara Strong
Pavlova (Dobrodeyeva) – 07:09 / 1–0; Kulishova (Vafina, Shashkina) – 51:48 / 2–0			Referees: (Sweden) Maria Furberg (United States) Jestina Vichorek; Linesmen: (Canada) Jessica Chartrand (United States) Sara Strong
4 min	Penalties	8 min	Referees: (Sweden) Maria Furberg (United States) Jestina Vichorek; Linesmen: (Canada) Jessica Chartrand (United States) Sara Strong
23	Shots	21	Referees: (Sweden) Maria Furberg (United States) Jestina Vichorek; Linesmen: (Canada) Jessica Chartrand (United States) Sara Strong

=== Third place game ===
31 August 2021; 13:30	Finland	3–1 (1–0, 2–1, 0–0)	Switzerland	WinSport Arena, Calgary

Game reference

Anni Keisala
Goalies
Saskia Maurer
Referees:
(United States) Kelly Cooke
(Canada) Lacey Senuk
Linesmen:
(Canada) Alexandra Blair
(United States) Kendall Hanley

Niskanen (Liikala) – 01:39	1–0
Viitasuo (Niskanen, Liikala) – 20:54	2–0
	2–1	23:35 – Stalder (Stänz)
Nieminen (Karvinen, Tapani) (PP) – 38:13	3–1

2 min
Penalties
8 min
32
Shots
19

=== Final ===
31 August 2021; 17:30	Canada	3–2 OT (0–2, 2–0, 0–0) (OT: 1–0)	United States	WinSport Arena, Calgary

Game reference

Ann-Renée Desbiens
Goalies
Nicole Hensley
Referees:
(Finland) Anniina Nurmi
(Switzerland) Anna Wiegand
Linesmen:
(Sweden) Anna Hammar
(Austria) Julia Kainberger

	0–1	09:55 – Carpenter (Kessel, Eden)
	0–2	12:35 – Carpenter (Stecklein, Pannek) (PP)
Jenner (Poulin, Fillier) (PP) – 24:13	1–2
Rattray (Larocque, Jenner) – 26:42	2–2
Poulin (Jenner, Larocque) – 67:22	3–2

10 min
Penalties
8 min
32
Shots
25

== Final standings ==
Pos	Grp	Team	Pld	W	OTW	OTL	L	GF	GA	GD	Pts	Final result
1	A	Canada (H)	7	6	1	0	0	34	7	+27	20	Champions
2	A	United States	7	5	0	1	1	28	10	+18	16	Runners-up
3	A	Finland	7	4	0	0	3	17	12	+5	12	Third place
4	A	Switzerland	7	0	1	0	6	5	26	−21	2	Fourth place
5	A	ROC	7	3	0	1	3	11	21	−10	10	Fifth place game
6	B	Japan	7	4	0	0	3	12	20	−8	12	Fifth place game
7	B	Czech Republic	6	4	0	0	2	18	7	+11	12	
8	B	Germany	6	2	0	0	4	9	15	−6	6	
9	B	Hungary	4	1	0	0	3	8	12	−4	3	Eliminated in Preliminary round
10	B	Denmark	4	0	0	0	4	3	15	−12	0	Eliminated in Preliminary round

Source: IIHF
Rules for classification: 1) position in the group; 2) number of points; 3) goal difference; 4) goals scored; 5) seeding before tournament.
(H) Host

No divisional relegation occurred after this tournament as the Division I tournament was cancelled due to the COVID-19 pandemic.

== Awards and statistics ==
=== Awards ===
Best player selected by the Directorate

Position	Player
Goaltender	(Finland) Anni Keisala
Defenceman	(United States) Lee Stecklein
Forward	(Canada) Mélodie Daoust
MVP	(Canada) Mélodie Daoust

All-Star team

Position	Player
Goaltender	(Finland) Anni Keisala
Defenceman	(United States) Lee Stecklein
Defenceman	(Canada) Erin Ambrose
Forward	(Canada) Mélodie Daoust
Forward	(Finland) Petra Nieminen
Forward	(Canada) Natalie Spooner

=== Scoring leaders ===
List shows the top skaters sorted by points, then goals.

Player	GP	G	A	Pts	+/−	PIM	POS
(Canada) Mélodie Daoust	7	6	6	12	+13	0	F
(Canada) Brianne Jenner	6	3	8	11	+13	4	F
(Canada) Natalie Spooner	7	4	5	9	+11	0	F
(Canada) Marie-Philip Poulin	6	3	6	9	+10	2	F
(Finland) Petra Nieminen	7	6	1	7	+3	0	F
(Czech Republic) Alena Mills	6	5	2	7	+2	4	F
(United States) Lee Stecklein	7	2	5	7	+12	0	D
(United States) Hilary Knight	7	4	2	6	+3	2	F
(United States) Grace Zumwinkle	7	4	2	6	+5	2	F
(Canada) Sarah Fillier	7	3	3	6	+6	6	F

GP = Games played; G = Goals; A = Assists; Pts = Points; +/− = Plus/minus; PIM = Penalties in minutes; POS = Position
Source: IIHF

=== Leading goaltenders ===
Only the top five goaltenders, based on save percentage, who have played at least 40% of their team's minutes, are included in this list.

Player	TOI	GA	GAA	SA	Sv%	SO
(Germany) Jennifer Harß	180:00	3	1.00	62	95.16	1
(Finland) Anni Keisala	294:09	7	1.43	136	94.85	2
(Switzerland) Saskia Maurer	214:03	7	1.96	120	94.17	0
(United States) Nicole Hensley	240:06	4	1.00	65	93.85	2
(Czech Republic) Klára Peslarová	358:14	7	1.17	105	93.33	2

TOI = Time on ice (minutes:seconds); SA = Shots against; GA = Goals against; GAA = Goals against average; Sv% = Save percentage; SO = Shutouts
Source: IIHF
