= Keely Moy =

Swiss-American ice hockey player

- Born: April 23, 1998 (age 27) San Diego, California, U.S.
- Height: 5 ft 9 in (175 cm)
- Position: Forward
- Shoots: Right
- NCAA team: Harvard Crimson
- National team: Switzerland
- Playing career: 2017–present

Keely Moy (born April 23, 1998) is a Swiss-American ice hockey forward. She competed in the 2022 Winter Olympics.

== Career ==
Moy played college ice hockey at Harvard University beginning in 2017. She moved to Switzerland in 2020 to play for HC Ladies Lugano. By playing one season in the Swiss league and living in Switzerland for eight months, she was eligible to represent Switzerland in international competitions. She was a member of the Swiss team at the 2022 Winter Olympics, assisting a goal in a 4–2 win over the ROC to send Switzerland to the semifinals of the tournament.

== Personal life ==
Moy attends Harvard, where she is studying for a degree in economics. Her older brother Tyler is also an ice hockey player who was drafted by the Nashville Predators in 2015. She was eligible to represent Switzerland through her mother, who was born in Lucerne.
