= Kristi Shashkina =

Estonian ice hockey player (born 2003)

- Born: 9 January 2003 (age 23) Tartu, Estonia
- Height: 177 cm (5 ft 10 in)
- Weight: 82 kg (181 lb; 12 st 13 lb)
- Position: Forward
- Shoots: Left
- PFWL team Former teams: ZSC Lions: SKIF Nizhny Novgorod; Dynamo-Neva St. Petersburg; İstanbul BBSK
- National team: Russia
- Playing career: 2018–present

Kristi Yuryevna Shashkina (Estonian: Kristi Šaškina, Russian: Кристи Юрьевна Шашкина; born 9 January 2003) is an Estonian and Russian professional ice hockey player. She has played in the Swiss Women's League (PFWL) with the ZSC Lions since 2025.

== Playing career ==
As a child, Shashkina played on boys' ice hockey teams of Kajakas Tartu sports club in her home city of Tartu, Estonia. At age thirteen, after being scouted at various tournaments abroad, she received and accepted an offer from the HC SKIF under-18 (U18) team in Nizhny Novgorod, a joint academic and athletic program for secondary school students.

Two years later, Shashkina made her senior club debut with SKIF Nizhny Novgorod in the 2018–19 season of the Zhenskaya Hockey League (ZhHL) and played with the club through the 2019–20 season.

Motivated by concerns surrounding the CoVid-19 epidemic, Shashkina's parents encouraged her to play outside of Russia in 2020 and the seventeen year old opted to sign with the ZSC Lions in the Swiss Women's League for the 2020–21 season.

She returned to the ZhHL in the 2021–22 season, signing with the newly re-established Dynamo-Neva Saint Petersburg. She played with the club until the Russian invasion of Ukraine in late February 2022, at which time she returned to Estonia and briefly played with HK Säde in the PAF Eesti Naiste Hokiliiga.

The following season, Shashkina signed with İstanbul Büyükşehir Belediyespor (İstanbul BBSK or İBBSK) in the Kadınlar Süper Ligi, the Turkish national women's ice hockey championship league. She played with İstanbul BBSK through the 2024–25 season and was the team's leading scorer in all three seasons. In the 2022–23 season, she scored 42 goals and 63 points in fifteen games, ranking second in the league for goals and third for points. She then led the league in both goals and points in the subsequent two seasons, notching 71 goals and 105 points across fourteen games in 2023–24, and 65 goals and 95 points across fourteen games in 2024–25. In total, Shashkina amassed 178 goals and 85 assists across 43 Kadınlar Süper Ligi games.

Shashkina returned to the ZSC Lions for the 2025–26 season on a one-year contract.

== International play ==
As a youth player with the Russian national under-18 team, Shashkina participated in the IIHF U18 Women's World Championship in 2019, scoring one goal and two points in six games. In 2020, she scored four goals and eight points in six games to become the first Russian player to top the scoring table at an IIHF U18 Women's World Championship. In addition to playing a key part in Russia's bronze medal victory, Shashkina was selected as the best forward of the tournament by the directorate and was also named tournament MVP by the media.

Shashkina took part in the 2021 IIHF Women's World Championship with the Russian national team, which participated in the tournament as the Russian Olympic Committee (ROC).

== Personal life ==
Shashkina was born on 9 January 2003 to an Estonian mother, Asta, and Russian father, Yuri.

She is one of five siblings. Shashkina's elder brother, Denis Shashkin, represented Estonia in the men's ice hockey qualification tournament for the 2022 Winter Olympics and at various international tournaments at the U18 and U20 levels.
