= Maria Pechnikova =

Russian ice hockey player

Maria Pechnikova Мария Печникова
- Born: 8 June 1992 (age 34) Izhevsk, Udmurtia, Russia
- Height: 1.78 m (5 ft 10 in)
- Weight: 57 kg (126 lb; 9 st 0 lb)
- Position: Defense
- Shoots: Left
- ZhHL team Former teams: Agidel Ufa; SKIF Nizhny Novgorod
- National team: Russia
- Playing career: 2009–present
Medal record
Universiade
Gold medal – first place	2015 Granada	Ice hockey

Maria Anatolyevna Pechnikova (Russian: Мария Анатольевна Печникова, romanized: Mariya Anatol'yevna Pechnikova; born 8 June 1992) is a Russian ice hockey player and member of the Russian national ice hockey team, currently serving as captain of Agidel Ufa in the Zhenskaya Hockey League (ZhHL).

Pechnikova represented Russia at the IIHF Women's World Championships in 2012 and 2015, and won gold with the Russian team in the women's ice hockey tournament at the 2015 Winter Universiade.
