= Veronika Korzhakova =

Russian ice hockey player

Veronika Korzhakova Вероника Коржакова
- Born: 9 June 2003 (age 21); Chelyabinsk, Russia
- Height: 167 cm (5 ft 6 in)
- Weight: 62 kg (137 lb; 9 st 11 lb)
- Position: Forward
- Shoots: Left
- ZhHL team: Agidel Ufa
- National team: Russia
- Playing career: 2018–present

Veronika Evgenyevna Korzhakova (Russian: Вероника Евгеньевна Коржакова; born 9 June 2003) is a Russian ice hockey player and member of the Russian national ice hockey team, currently playing in the Zhenskaya Hockey League (ZhHL) with Agidel Ufa.

Korzhakova represented the Russian Olympic Committee at the 2021 IIHF Women's World Championship. As a junior player with the Russian national under-18 team, she won a bronze medal at the 2020 IIHF Women's U18 World Championship.

She made her senior club debut with Agidel Ufa in the 2018–19 ZhHL season and has played the entirety of her career with the club. Korzhakova was selected to the 2022 ZhHL All-Star Game.
