= Waidacher =

Waidacher is a surname. Notable people with the surname include:

- Isabel Waidacher (born 1994), Swiss ice hockey player, sister of Monika and Nina
- Monika Waidacher (born 1990), Swiss ice hockey player
- Nina Kindschi (born 1992), Swiss ice hockey player
