= Ice hockey at the 2014 Winter Olympics – Women's team rosters =

These are the team rosters of the nations participating in the women's ice hockey tournament of the 2014 Winter Olympics.

== Group A ==
=== Canada ===
The following is the Canadian roster in the women's ice hockey tournament of the 2014 Winter Olympics.

No.	Pos.	Name	Height	Weight	Birthdate	Birthplace	2013–14 team
1	G	Shannon Szabados	175 cm (5 ft 9 in)	65 kg (143 lb)	6 August 1986	Edmonton, AB	(Canada) NWT Centralized Roster
2	F	Meghan Agosta-Marciano	168 cm (5 ft 6 in)	67 kg (148 lb)	12 February 1987	Windsor, ON	(Canada) Montreal Stars (CWHL)
3	D	Jocelyne Larocque	170 cm (5 ft 7 in)	63 kg (139 lb)	19 May 1988	Ste. Anne, MB	(Canada) Calgary Inferno (CWHL)
5	D	Lauriane Rougeau	173 cm (5 ft 8 in)	75 kg (165 lb)	12 April 1990	Pointe-Claire, QC	(United States) Cornell Big Red (NCAA)
6	F	Rebecca Johnston	170 cm (5 ft 7 in)	76 kg (168 lb)	24 September 1989	Sudbury, ON	(Canada) Toronto Furies (CWHL)
8	D	Laura Fortino	164 cm (5 ft 5 in)	62 kg (137 lb)	30 January 1991	Hamilton, ON	(United States) Cornell Big Red (NCAA)
9	F	Jennifer Wakefield	175 cm (5 ft 9 in)	77 kg (170 lb)	15 June 1989	Scarborough, ON	(Canada) Toronto Furies (CWHL)
10	F	Gillian Apps	183 cm (6 ft 0 in)	80 kg (180 lb)	2 November 1983	North York, ON	(Canada) Brampton Thunder (CWHL)
12	D	Meaghan Mikkelson	175 cm (5 ft 9 in)	88 kg (194 lb)	4 January 1985	Regina, SK	(Canada) Calgary Inferno (CWHL)
13	F	Caroline Ouellette – C	180 cm (5 ft 11 in)	77 kg (170 lb)	25 May 1979	Montreal, QC	(Canada) Montreal Stars (CWHL)
15	F	Mélodie Daoust	163 cm (5 ft 4 in)	71 kg (157 lb)	7 January 1992	Valleyfield, QC	(Canada) McGill Martlets (CIS)
16	F	Jayna Hefford – A	163 cm (5 ft 4 in)	63 kg (139 lb)	14 May 1977	Trenton, ON	(Canada) Brampton Thunder (CWHL)
18	D	Catherine Ward – A	168 cm (5 ft 6 in)	67 kg (148 lb)	27 February 1987	Montreal, QC	(Canada) Montreal Stars (CWHL)
19	F	Brianne Jenner	175 cm (5 ft 9 in)	70 kg (150 lb)	4 May 1991	Oakville, ON	(United States) Cornell Big Red (NCAA)
21	F	Haley Irwin	170 cm (5 ft 7 in)	78 kg (172 lb)	6 June 1988	Thunder Bay, ON	(Canada) Montreal Stars (CWHL)
22	F	Hayley Wickenheiser – A	178 cm (5 ft 10 in)	77 kg (170 lb)	12 August 1978	Shaunavon, SK	(Canada) Calgary Dinos (CIS)
24	F	Natalie Spooner	178 cm (5 ft 10 in)	80 kg (180 lb)	17 October 1990	Scarborough, ON	(Canada) Toronto Furies (CWHL)
27	D	Tara Watchorn	178 cm (5 ft 10 in)	76 kg (168 lb)	30 May 1990	Ajax, ON	(Canada) Calgary Inferno (CWHL)
29	F	Marie-Philip Poulin	169 cm (5 ft 7 in)	72 kg (159 lb)	28 March 1991	Quebec City, QC	(United States) Boston University Terriers (NCAA)
31	G	Geneviève Lacasse	173 cm (5 ft 8 in)	67 kg (148 lb)	5 May 1989	Montreal, QC	(United States) Boston Blades (CWHL)
32	G	Charline Labonté	175 cm (5 ft 9 in)	78 kg (172 lb)	15 October 1982	Greenfield Park, QC	(Canada) Montreal Stars (CWHL)

=== Finland ===
The Finnish roster for the women's ice hockey tournament of the 2014 Winter Olympics was published on 18 December 2013. The players were picked by the head coach Mika Pieniniemi.

No.	Pos.	Name	Height	Weight	Birthdate	Birthplace	2013–14 team
1	G	Eveliina Suonpää	173 cm (5 ft 8 in)	63 kg (139 lb)	12 April 1995	Kiukainen	(Finland) Team Oriflame Kuortane (SM-sarja)
3	D	Emma Terho	159 cm (5 ft 3 in)	60 kg (130 lb)	17 December 1981	Washington, D.C., USA	(Finland) Espoo Blues (SM-sarja)
4	D	Rosa Lindstedt	186 cm (6 ft 1 in)	80 kg (180 lb)	24 January 1988	Ylöjärvi	(Finland) JYP Jyväskylä (SM-sarja)
5	D	Anna Kilponen	169 cm (5 ft 7 in)	74 kg (163 lb)	16 May 1995	Orivesi	(Finland) Team Oriflame Kuortane (SM-sarja)
6	D	Jenni Hiirikoski – C	162 cm (5 ft 4 in)	60 kg (130 lb)	30 March 1987	Lempäälä	(Finland) JYP Jyväskylä (SM-sarja)
7	D	Mira Jalosuo	184 cm (6 ft 0 in)	80 kg (180 lb)	3 February 1989	Lieksa	(Russia) SKIF Nizhny Novgorod (RWHL)
9	F	Venla Hovi	169 cm (5 ft 7 in)	63 kg (139 lb)	28 October 1987	Tampere	(Finland) KalPa Kuopio (SM-sarja)
10	F	Linda Välimäki	166 cm (5 ft 5 in)	70 kg (150 lb)	31 May 1990	Ylöjärvi	(Finland) Espoo Blues (SM-sarja)
11	F	Anniina Rajahuhta	164 cm (5 ft 5 in)	70 kg (150 lb)	8 March 1989	Helsinki	(Finland) Espoo Blues (SM-sarja)
13	F	Riikka Välilä	160 cm (5 ft 3 in)	63 kg (139 lb)	12 June 1973	Jyväskylä	(Finland) JYP Jyväskylä (SM-sarja)
15	F	Minttu Tuominen	165 cm (5 ft 5 in)	70 kg (150 lb)	26 June 1990	Helsinki	(Finland) Espoo Blues (SM-sarja)
16	F	Vilma Tanskanen	175 cm (5 ft 9 in)	66 kg (146 lb)	14 April 1995	Helsinki	(Finland) Team Oriflame Kuortane (SM-sarja)
18	G	Meeri Räisänen	170 cm (5 ft 7 in)	62 kg (137 lb)	2 December 1989	Tampere	(Finland) JYP Jyväskylä (SM-sarja)
20	D	Saija Tarkki	172 cm (5 ft 8 in)	60 kg (130 lb)	29 December 1982	Oulu	(Finland) Oulun Kärpät (SM-sarja)
21	F	Michelle Karvinen	166 cm (5 ft 5 in)	69 kg (152 lb)	27 March 1990	Rødovre, Denmark	(United States) University of North Dakota (NCAA)
23	F	Nina Tikkinen	170 cm (5 ft 7 in)	66 kg (146 lb)	6 February 1987	Salo	(Finland) Oulun Kärpät (SM-sarja)
29	F	Karoliina Rantamäki	163 cm (5 ft 4 in)	65 kg (143 lb)	23 February 1978	Vantaa	(Russia) SKIF Nizhny Novgorod (RWHL)
41	G	Noora Räty	165 cm (5 ft 5 in)	70 kg (150 lb)	29 May 1989	Espoo	(Finland) Ilves Tampere (SM-sarja)
77	F	Susanna Tapani	177 cm (5 ft 10 in)	64 kg (141 lb)	2 March 1993	Laitila	(United States) University of North Dakota (NCAA)
80	D	Tea Villilä	168 cm (5 ft 6 in)	63 kg (139 lb)	16 April 1991	Hyvinkää	(United States) Minnesota Duluth Bulldogs (NCAA)
96	F	Emma Nuutinen	176 cm (5 ft 9 in)	73 kg (161 lb)	7 December 1996	Helsinki	(Finland) Espoo Blues (SM-sarja)

=== Switzerland ===
The following is the Swiss roster in the women's ice hockey tournament of the 2014 Winter Olympics.

No.	Pos.	Name	Height	Weight	Birthdate	Birthplace	2013–14 team
1	G	Janine Alder	161 cm (5 ft 3 in)	53 kg (117 lb)	5 July 1995	Urnäsch	(Switzerland) EHC Winterthur (Elite Jr. B)
2	F	Katrin Nabholz	168 cm (5 ft 6 in)	56 kg (123 lb)	3 April 1986	Zürich	(Switzerland) ZSC Lions (LKA)
3	D	Sarah Forster	169 cm (5 ft 7 in)	55 kg (121 lb)	19 May 1993	Berneck	(Switzerland) HC Ajoie (Elite Jr. B)
6	D	Julia Marty	169 cm (5 ft 7 in)	69 kg (152 lb)	16 April 1988	Rothenthurm	(Sweden) Linkopings HC (RIKS)
7	F	Lara Stalder	166 cm (5 ft 5 in)	60 kg (130 lb)	15 May 1994	Lucerne	(United States) Minnesota Duluth Bulldogs (NCAA)
9	F	Stefanie Marty	168 cm (5 ft 6 in)	72 kg (159 lb)	16 April 1988	Rothenthurm	(Sweden) Linkopings HC (RIKS)
10	D	Nicole Bullo	160 cm (5 ft 3 in)	56 kg (123 lb)	18 July 1987	Claro	(Switzerland) HC Lugano (LKA)
11	D	Angela Frautschi	169 cm (5 ft 7 in)	73 kg (161 lb)	5 June 1987	Saanen	(Switzerland) ZSC Lions (LKA)
13	F	Sara Benz	163 cm (5 ft 4 in)	55 kg (121 lb)	25 August 1992	Kloten	(Switzerland) ZSC Lions (LKA)
14	F	Evelina Raselli	170 cm (5 ft 7 in)	64 kg (141 lb)	3 May 1992	Poschiavo	(Switzerland) HC Lugano (LKA)
16	F	Nina Waidacher	170 cm (5 ft 7 in)	65 kg (143 lb)	23 August 1992	Arosa	(United States) St. Scholastica Saints (NCAA)
17	F	Jessica Lutz	174 cm (5 ft 9 in)	65 kg (143 lb)	24 May 1989	Thal	(United States) Ronin (KCIHL)
21	D	Laura Benz	172 cm (5 ft 8 in)	63 kg (139 lb)	25 August 1992	Kloten	(Switzerland) ZSC Lions (LKA)
22	D	Livia Altmann	165 cm (5 ft 5 in)	64 kg (141 lb)	13 December 1994	Glarus Süd	(Switzerland) ZSC Lions (LKA)
25	F	Alina Müller	162 cm (5 ft 4 in)	50 kg (110 lb)	12 March 1998	Lengnau	(Switzerland) EHC Winterthur (Novizen Elite)
28	G	Sophie Anthamatten	171 cm (5 ft 7 in)	72 kg (159 lb)	26 July 1991	Saas-Grund	(Switzerland) EHC Saastal (1. Liga)
41	G	Florence Schelling	174 cm (5 ft 9 in)	65 kg (143 lb)	9 March 1989	Schaffhausen	(Switzerland) EHC Bülach (1. Liga)
61	F	Romy Eggimann	157 cm (5 ft 2 in)	54 kg (119 lb)	29 September 1995	Sumiswald	(Switzerland) HC Lugano (LKA)
63	F	Anja Stiefel	160 cm (5 ft 3 in)	60 kg (130 lb)	9 August 1990	Wil	(Switzerland) HC Lugano (LKA)
88	F	Phoebe Stanz	163 cm (5 ft 4 in)	62 kg (137 lb)	7 January 1994	Zetzwil	(United States) Yale Bulldogs (NCAA)
92	D	Sandra Thalmann	163 cm (5 ft 4 in)	68 kg (150 lb)	18 December 1992	Basel	(Switzerland) SC Reinach (LKA)

=== United States ===
The following is the United States roster in the women's ice hockey tournament of the 2014 Winter Olympics.

Head coach: (United States) Katey Stone Assistant coaches: (United States) Hilary Witt, (United States) Bobby Jay

No.	Pos.	Name	Height	Weight	Birthdate	Birthplace	2013–14 team
2	D	Lee Stecklein	183 cm (6 ft 0 in)	77 kg (170 lb)	23 April 1994 (aged 19)	Roseville, Minnesota	(United States) Minnesota Golden Gophers (NCAA)
7	F	Monique Lamoureux-Kolls	168 cm (5 ft 6 in)	70 kg (150 lb)	3 July 1989 (aged 24)	Grand Forks, North Dakota	(United States) University of North Dakota (NCAA)
9	D	Megan Bozek	173 cm (5 ft 8 in)	80 kg (180 lb)	27 March 1991 (aged 22)	Buffalo Grove, Illinois	(United States) Minnesota Golden Gophers (NCAA)
10	F	Meghan Duggan – C	178 cm (5 ft 10 in)	75 kg (165 lb)	3 September 1987 (aged 26)	Danvers, Massachusetts	(United States) Boston Blades (CWHL)
13	F	Julie Chu	173 cm (5 ft 8 in)	67 kg (148 lb)	13 March 1982 (aged 31)	Fairfield, Connecticut	(Canada) Montreal Stars (CWHL)
14	F	Brianna Decker	160 cm (5 ft 3 in)	68 kg (150 lb)	13 May 1991 (aged 22)	Dousman, Wisconsin	(United States) Wisconsin Badgers (NCAA)
15	D	Anne Schleper	178 cm (5 ft 10 in)	77 kg (170 lb)	30 January 1990 (aged 24)	St. Cloud, Minnesota	(United States) Boston Blades (CWHL)
16	F	Kelli Stack	163 cm (5 ft 4 in)	61 kg (134 lb)	13 January 1988 (aged 26)	Brooklyn Heights, Ohio	(United States) Boston Blades (CWHL)
17	F	Jocelyne Lamoureux	165 cm (5 ft 5 in)	68 kg (150 lb)	3 July 1989 (aged 24)	Grand Forks, North Dakota	(United States) University of North Dakota (NCAA)
18	F	Lyndsey Fry	173 cm (5 ft 8 in)	75 kg (165 lb)	30 October 1992 (aged 21)	Chandler, Arizona	(United States) Harvard Crimson (NCAA)
19	D	Gigi Marvin	173 cm (5 ft 8 in)	70 kg (150 lb)	7 March 1987 (aged 26)	Warroad, Minnesota	(United States) Boston Blades (CWHL)
21	F	Hilary Knight	180 cm (5 ft 11 in)	84 kg (185 lb)	12 July 1989 (aged 24)	Sun Valley, Idaho	(United States) Boston Blades (CWHL)
22	D	Kacey Bellamy	170 cm (5 ft 7 in)	66 kg (146 lb)	22 April 1987 (aged 26)	Westfield, Massachusetts	(United States) Boston Blades (CWHL)
23	D	Michelle Picard	163 cm (5 ft 4 in)	68 kg (150 lb)	27 May 1993 (aged 20)	Taunton, Massachusetts	(United States) Harvard Crimson (NCAA)
24	D	Josephine Pucci	173 cm (5 ft 8 in)	68 kg (150 lb)	27 December 1990 (aged 23)	Pearl River, New York	(United States) Harvard Crimson (NCAA)
25	F	Alex Carpenter	168 cm (5 ft 6 in)	73 kg (161 lb)	13 April 1994 (aged 19)	North Reading, Massachusetts	(United States) Boston College Eagles (NCAA)
26	F	Kendall Coyne	157 cm (5 ft 2 in)	57 kg (126 lb)	25 May 1992 (aged 21)	Palos Heights, Illinois	(United States) Northeastern Huskies (NCAA)
28	F	Amanda Kessel	165 cm (5 ft 5 in)	61 kg (134 lb)	28 August 1991 (aged 22)	Madison, Wisconsin	(United States) Minnesota Golden Gophers (NCAA)
29	G	Brianne McLaughlin	175 cm (5 ft 9 in)	58 kg (128 lb)	20 June 1987 (aged 26)	Sheffield, Ohio	(Canada) Burlington Barracudas (CWHL)
30	G	Molly Schaus	175 cm (5 ft 9 in)	70 kg (150 lb)	29 July 1988 (aged 25)	Natick, Massachusetts	(United States) Boston Blades (CWHL)
31	G	Jessie Vetter	173 cm (5 ft 8 in)	68 kg (150 lb)	19 December 1985 (aged 28)	Cottage Grove, Wisconsin	(United States) Oregon Outlaws (GLHL)

== Group B ==
=== Germany ===
On 15 January 2014, head coach Klaus Kathan nominated the following roster:

No.	Pos.	Name	Height	Weight	Birthdate	Birthplace	2013–14 team
3	F	Sophie Kratzer	171 cm (5 ft 7 in)	74 kg (163 lb)	20 April 1989	Landshut	(Germany) ESC Planegg-Würmtal (DFEL)
4	D	Jessica Hammerl	161 cm (5 ft 3 in)	63 kg (139 lb)	10 July 1988	Landshut	(Germany) TSV Erding II (EBB)
5	F	Manuela Anwander	164 cm (5 ft 5 in)	68 kg (150 lb)	9 January 1992	Gräfelfing	(Germany) ERC Ingolstadt (DFEL)
6	D	Bettina Evers	167 cm (5 ft 6 in)	70 kg (150 lb)	17 August 1981	Hannover	(Germany) ESC Planegg-Würmtal (DFEL)
7	F	Nina Kamenik	161 cm (5 ft 3 in)	57 kg (126 lb)	27 April 1985	Berlin	(Germany) OSC Berlin (DFEL)
8	F	Julia Zorn	170 cm (5 ft 7 in)	73 kg (161 lb)	6 February 1990	Gräfelfing	(Germany) ESC Planegg-Würmtal (DFEL)
10	D	Anja Weisser	174 cm (5 ft 9 in)	74 kg (163 lb)	2 October 1991	Marktoberdorf	(Canada) University of Prince Edward Island (CIS)
12	D	Susann Götz	163 cm (5 ft 4 in)	65 kg (143 lb)	14 December 1982	Bad Muskau	(Germany) OSC Berlin (DFEL)
13	G	Ivonne Schröder	177 cm (5 ft 10 in)	67 kg (148 lb)	25 July 1988	Bad Muskau	(Germany) ELV Tornado Niesky (OLO)
14	F	Jacqueline Janzen	178 cm (5 ft 10 in)	83 kg (183 lb)	29 November 1993	Villingen	(Germany) ECDC Memmingen Indians (DFEL)
15	F	Andrea Lanzl	162 cm (5 ft 4 in)	67 kg (148 lb)	8 October 1987	Starnberg	(Germany) ERC Ingolstadt (DFEL)
17	F	Sara Seiler	169 cm (5 ft 7 in)	65 kg (143 lb)	25 January 1983	Hausham	(Germany) ERC Ingolstadt (DFEL)
18	D	Susanne Fellner	159 cm (5 ft 3 in)	59 kg (130 lb)	26 February 1985	Ravensburg	(Germany) ECDC Memmingen Indians (DFEL)
22	F	Kerstin Spielberger	169 cm (5 ft 7 in)	61 kg (134 lb)	14 December 1995	Burghausen	(Germany) EHC Klostersee U18 (JBL)
23	D	Tanja Eisenschmid	170 cm (5 ft 7 in)	63 kg (139 lb)	20 April 1993	Marktoberdorf	(United States) University of North Dakota (NCAA)
24	D	Lisa Schuster	169 cm (5 ft 7 in)	70 kg (150 lb)	28 May 1987	Munich	(Germany) OSC Berlin (DFEL)
25	F	Franziska Busch	163 cm (5 ft 4 in)	68 kg (150 lb)	20 October 1985	Seesen	(Germany) ECDC Memmingen Indians (DFEL)
26	F	Monika Bittner	156 cm (5 ft 1 in)	59 kg (130 lb)	29 January 1988	Peißenberg	(Germany) ESC Planegg-Würmtal (DFEL)
27	G	Viona Harrer	169 cm (5 ft 7 in)	55 kg (121 lb)	5 November 1986	Rosenheim	(Germany) EC Bad Tölz (OLS)
30	G	Jennifer Harß	175 cm (5 ft 9 in)	65 kg (143 lb)	14 July 1987	Füssen	(Germany) ERC Sonthofen (EBL)
81	F	Maritta Becker	168 cm (5 ft 6 in)	63 kg (139 lb)	11 March 1981	Heilbronn	(Germany) ERC Ingolstadt (DFEL)

=== Japan ===
The following is the Japanese roster in the women's ice hockey tournament of the 2014 Winter Olympics.

No.	Pos.	Name	Height	Weight	Birthdate	Birthplace	2013–14 team
1	G	Azusa Nakaoku	157 cm (5 ft 2 in)	53 kg (117 lb)	17 May 1985	Yufutsu	(Japan) Toyota Cygnus (JWHL)
2	D	Shiori Koike	158 cm (5 ft 2 in)	51 kg (112 lb)	21 March 1993	Kujiramachi	(Japan) Mitsuboshi Daito Peregrine (JWHL)
3	D	Yoko Kondo	165 cm (5 ft 5 in)	60 kg (130 lb)	13 February 1979	Niida	(Japan) Seibu Princess Rabbits (JWHL)
4	D	Ayaka Toko	161 cm (5 ft 3 in)	59 kg (130 lb)	22 August 1994	Fujimi	(Japan) Daishin (JWHL)
5	D	Kanae Aoki	165 cm (5 ft 5 in)	60 kg (130 lb)	20 February 1985	Aoba	(Japan) Mitsuboshi Daito Peregrine (JWHL)
6	D	Sena Suzuki	166 cm (5 ft 5 in)	57 kg (126 lb)	4 August 1991	Sanko	(Japan) Seibu Princess Rabbits (JWHL)
7	D	Mika Hori	163 cm (5 ft 4 in)	54 kg (119 lb)	17 February 1992	Atsuma	(Japan) Toyota Cygnus (JWHL)
8	D	Tomoe Yamane	168 cm (5 ft 6 in)	70 kg (150 lb)	24 March 1986	Mihara	(Japan) Daishin (JWHL)
9	D	Aina Takeuchi	166 cm (5 ft 5 in)	63 kg (139 lb)	16 August 1991	Musa	(Japan) Daishin (JWHL)
10	F	Haruna Yoneyama	160 cm (5 ft 3 in)	55 kg (121 lb)	7 November 1991	Shizunai	(Japan) Mitsuboshi Daito Peregrine (JWHL)
11	F	Yurie Adachi	156 cm (5 ft 1 in)	51 kg (112 lb)	26 April 1985	Maruyama	(Japan) Seibu Princess Rabbits (JWHL)
12	F	Chiho Osawa	162 cm (5 ft 4 in)	63 kg (139 lb)	10 February 1992	Ojimachi	(Japan) Mitsuboshi Daito Peregrine (JWHL)
13	F	Moeko Fujimoto	155 cm (5 ft 1 in)	53 kg (117 lb)	5 August 1992	Shinkai	(Japan) Mitsuboshi Daito Peregrine (JWHL)
15	F	Rui Ukita	168 cm (5 ft 6 in)	71 kg (157 lb)	6 June 1996	Masuura	(Japan) Daishin (JWHL)
17	F	Yuka Hirano	157 cm (5 ft 2 in)	52 kg (115 lb)	26 January 1987	Yokkaichi	(Japan) Mitsuboshi Daito Peregrine (JWHL)
18	F	Tomoko Sakagami	163 cm (5 ft 4 in)	58 kg (128 lb)	18 October 1983	Sanko	(Japan) Mitsuboshi Daito Peregrine (JWHL)
21	F	Hanae Kubo	168 cm (5 ft 6 in)	63 kg (139 lb)	10 December 1982	Sanko	(Japan) Seibu Princess Rabbits (JWHL)
22	F	Miho Shishiuchi	164 cm (5 ft 5 in)	62 kg (137 lb)	21 August 1992	Kaizuka	(Japan) Kushiro Bears (JWHL)
23	F	Ami Nakamura	162 cm (5 ft 4 in)	62 kg (137 lb)	15 November 1987	Toyosakimachi	(Japan) Seibu Princess Rabbits (JWHL)
29	G	Akane Konishi	164 cm (5 ft 5 in)	62 kg (137 lb)	14 August 1995	Kushiro	(Japan) Kushiro Bears (JWHL)
30	G	Nana Fujimoto	163 cm (5 ft 4 in)	54 kg (119 lb)	3 March 1989	Sapporo	(Japan) Vortex Sapporo (JWHL)

=== Russia ===
The following is the Russian roster in the women's ice hockey tournament of the 2014 Winter Olympics.

Head coach: (Russia) Mikhail Chekanov Assistant coach: (Russia) Yuri Novikov

No.	Pos.	Name	Height	Weight	Birthdate	Birthplace	2013–14 team
1	G	Anna Prugova	175 cm (5 ft 9 in)	62 kg (137 lb)	20 November 1993	Khabarovsk	(Russia) Tornado Moscow Region (RWHL)
2	D	Angelina Goncharenko	177 cm (5 ft 10 in)	71 kg (157 lb)	23 May 1994	Moscow	(Russia) Agidel Ufa (RWHL)
4	D	Alena Khomich	168 cm (5 ft 6 in)	53 kg (117 lb)	26 February 1981	Pervouralsk, Soviet Union	(Russia) Agidel Ufa (RWHL)
8	F	Iya Gavrilova	170 cm (5 ft 7 in)	63 kg (139 lb)	3 September 1987	Krasnoyarsk, Soviet Union	(Russia) Tornado Moscow Region (RWHL)
9	F	Alexandra Vafina	165 cm (5 ft 5 in)	58 kg (128 lb)	28 July 1990	Almaty, Kazakh SSR, Soviet Union	(Russia) Fakel Chelyabinsk (RWHL)
17	F	Yekaterina Smolentseva	176 cm (5 ft 9 in)	64 kg (141 lb)	15 September 1981	Pervouralsk	(Russia) Tornado Moscow Region (RWHL)
18	F	Olga Sosina	163 cm (5 ft 4 in)	77 kg (170 lb)	27 July 1992	Almetyevsk	(Russia) SKIF Nizhni Novgorod (RWHL)
20	G	Yulia Leskina	178 cm (5 ft 10 in)	76 kg (168 lb)	9 February 1991	Pervouralsk, Soviet Union	(Russia) Spartak-Merkuri Yekaterinburg (RWHL)
21	D	Anna Shukina	171 cm (5 ft 7 in)	76 kg (168 lb)	5 November 1987	Balakirevo, Soviet Union	(Russia) Tornado Moscow Region (RWHL)
23	F	Tatiana Burina	163 cm (5 ft 4 in)	68 kg (150 lb)	20 March 1980	Novosibirsk, Soviet Union	(Russia) Tornado Moscow Region (RWHL)
25	F	Yekaterina Lebedeva	165 cm (5 ft 5 in)	69 kg (152 lb)	14 September 1989	Sverdlovsk, Soviet Union	(Russia) Fakel Chelyabinsk (RWHL)
29	F	Anna Shokhina	163 cm (5 ft 4 in)	60 kg (132 lb)	23 June 1997	Novosinkovo	(Russia) Tornado Moscow Region (RWHL)
34	D	Svetlana Tkacheva	170 cm (5 ft 7 in)	60 kg (132 lb)	3 November 1984	Moscow, Soviet Union	(Russia) Tornado Moscow Region (RWHL)
44	D	Alexandra Kapustina	166 cm (5 ft 5 in)	74 kg (163 lb)	7 April 1984	Pervouralsk, Soviet Union	(Russia) SKIF Nizhny Novgorod (RWHL)
55	F	Galina Skiba	164 cm (5 ft 5 in)	66 kg (146 lb)	9 May 1984	Kharkiv, Ukrainian SSR, Soviet Union	(Russia) Tornado Moscow Region (RWHL)
70	D	Anna Shibanova	164 cm (5 ft 5 in)	62 kg (137 lb)	10 November 1994	Omsk	(Russia) Agidel Ufa (RWHL)
72	F	Yekaterina Pashkevich	174 cm (5 ft 9 in)	74 kg (163 lb)	19 December 1972	Moscow, Soviet Union	(Russia) Agidel Ufa (RWHL)
77	D	Inna Dyubanok	170 cm (5 ft 7 in)	74 kg (163 lb)	20 February 1990	Mozhaysk, Soviet Union	(Russia) Agidel Ufa (RWHL)
88	F	Yekaterina Smolina	164 cm (5 ft 5 in)	54 kg (119 lb)	8 October 1988	Ust-Kamenogorsk, Kazakh SSR, Soviet Union	(Russia) Tornado Moscow Region (RWHL)
95	F	Yelena Dergachyova	159 cm (5 ft 3 in)	57 kg (126 lb)	8 November 1995	Moscow	(Russia) Agidel Ufa (RWHL)
97	G	Anna Vinogradova	167 cm (5 ft 6 in)	69 kg (152 lb)	6 April 1991	Chelyabinsk, Soviet Union	(Russia) Fakel Chelyabinsk (RWHL)

=== Sweden ===
The following is the Swedish roster in the women's ice hockey tournament of the 2014 Winter Olympics.

No.	Pos.	Name	Height	Weight	Birthdate	Birthplace	2013–14 team
1	G	Sara Grahn	170 cm (5 ft 7 in)	69 kg (152 lb)	25 September 1988	Örebro	(Sweden) Brynäs IF (RIKS)
3	D	Sofia Engström	163 cm (5 ft 4 in)	63 kg (139 lb)	3 July 1988	Surahammar	(Sweden) Leksands IF (RIKS)
4	F	Jenni Asserholt – C	172 cm (5 ft 8 in)	71 kg (157 lb)	8 April 1988	Örebro	(Sweden) Linköpings HC (RIKS)
6	D	Lina Bäcklin	169 cm (5 ft 7 in)	67 kg (148 lb)	3 October 1994	Gävle	(Sweden) Brynäs IF (RIKS)
7	D	Johanna Olofsson	169 cm (5 ft 7 in)	66 kg (146 lb)	13 July 1991	Storuman	(Sweden) Modo Hockey (RIKS)
9	D	Josefine Holmgren	175 cm (5 ft 9 in)	72 kg (159 lb)	11 April 1993	Skutskär	(Sweden) Brynäs IF (RIKS)
10	D	Emilia Andersson	163 cm (5 ft 4 in)	63 kg (139 lb)	31 August 1988	Stockholm	(Sweden) Linköpings HC (RIKS)
11	F	Cecilia Östberg	166 cm (5 ft 5 in)	67 kg (148 lb)	15 January 1991	Leksand	(Sweden) Leksands IF (RIKS)
13	F	Lina Wester	170 cm (5 ft 7 in)	65 kg (143 lb)	7 November 1992	Rättvik	(Sweden) Leksands IF (RIKS)
16	F	Pernilla Winberg	165 cm (5 ft 5 in)	63 kg (139 lb)	24 February 1989	Limhamn	(Sweden) Munksund-Skuthamns SK (RIKS)
17	D	Linnea Bäckman	167 cm (5 ft 6 in)	66 kg (146 lb)	18 April 1991	Stockholm	(Sweden) AIK IF (RIKS)
18	F	Anna Borgqvist	163 cm (5 ft 4 in)	63 kg (139 lb)	11 June 1992	Växjö	(Sweden) Brynäs IF (RIKS)
19	F	Maria Lindh	176 cm (5 ft 9 in)	63 kg (139 lb)	29 September 1993	Stockholm	(Sweden) Modo Hockey (RIKS)
20	F	Fanny Rask	168 cm (5 ft 6 in)	64 kg (141 lb)	21 May 1991	Leksand	(Sweden) AIK IF (RIKS)
21	F	Erica Udén Johansson	171 cm (5 ft 7 in)	72 kg (159 lb)	20 July 1989	Sundsvall	(Sweden) IF Sundsvall Hockey (RIKS)
22	D	Emma Eliasson	167 cm (5 ft 6 in)	68 kg (150 lb)	12 June 1989	Kiruna	(Sweden) Munksund-Skuthamns SK (RIKS)
24	F	Erika Grahm	174 cm (5 ft 9 in)	70 kg (150 lb)	26 January 1991	Kramfors	(Sweden) Modo Hockey (RIKS)
27	F	Emma Nordin	168 cm (5 ft 6 in)	70 kg (150 lb)	22 March 1991	Örnsköldsvik	(Sweden) Modo Hockey (RIKS)
28	F	Michelle Löwenhielm	172 cm (5 ft 8 in)	67 kg (148 lb)	22 March 1995	Stockholm	(Sweden) AIK IF (RIKS)
30	G	Kim Martin Hasson	166 cm (5 ft 5 in)	68 kg (150 lb)	28 February 1986	Stockholm	(Sweden) Linköpings HC (RIKS)
35	G	Valentina Lizana Wallner	170 cm (5 ft 7 in)	65 kg (143 lb)	30 March 1990	Stockholm	(Sweden) Modo Hockey (RIKS)

== See also ==
- Ice hockey at the 2014 Winter Olympics – Men's team rosters
