= 2019–20 Women's League season =

- League: Women's League
- Sport: Ice hockey
- Duration: 14 September 2019 – 16 February 2020
- Games: 60
- Teams: 6

Regular Season
- Season champions: ZSC Lions Frauen
- Top scorer: (Switzerland) Dominique Rüegg

~~Playoffs~~

Women's League seasons
- ← 2018–19 2020–21 →

The 2019–20 Women's League season was the 34th ice hockey season of the Swiss Women's League. It was the first season to be played after the league was rebranded from Swiss Women's Hockey League A (SWHL A), the name that had been in use since 2014.

Shortly before the third playoff final match between the ZSC Lions Women and the Neuchâtel Hockey Academy, the season was cancelled on 12 March 2020, due to the COVID-19 pandemic.

== Teams ==
Swiss League teams for the 2019–20 season

Team	Trainer	City	Arena	Capacity
Ladies Team Lugano	Massimo Fedrizzi	Lugano	La Resega	7,200
HC Université Neuchâtel Dames	Yan Gigon, Charly Oppliger	Neuchâtel	Patinoire du Littoral	7,000
SC Reinach Damen	Christian Ruth, Stefanie Marty	Reinach	Kunsteisbahn Oberwynental	-
EV Bomo Thun	Jakob Kölliker	Thun	Kunsteisbahn Grabengut	4,000
SC Weinfelden Ladies	Andrea Kröni	Weinfelden	Güttingersreuti	3,100
ZSC Lions Frauen	Diane Michaud	Zürich	Kunsteisbahn Oerlikon	1,700

== Regular season ==
The regular season started on 14 September 2019 and ended on 16 February 2020. The SWHL A game mode provides a preliminary round (phase 1) with 10 matches per team and a Masterround with 10 additional matches per team. The top 4 teams qualify for the playoffs and the bottom two compete for a play-off against relegation. The loser must face the SWHLB champion.

Pos	Team	Pld	W	OTW	OTL	L	GF	GA	GD	Pts	Qualification
1	ZSC Lions Frauen	20	14	3	0	3	85	44	+41	48	Advance to Playoffs
2	Ladies Team Lugano	20	14	1	1	4	72	41	+31	45	Advance to Playoffs
3	HC Université Neuchâtel Dames	20	10	0	1	9	44	57	−13	31	Advance to Playoffs
4	SC Reinach Damen	20	8	1	3	8	62	53	+9	29	Advance to Playoffs
5	EV Bomo Thun	20	6	1	0	13	61	66	−5	20	
6	SC Weinfelden Ladies	20	2	0	1	17	34	97	−63	7	

Rules for classification: 1) points; 2) a higher number of wins in the regular time; 3) a higher number of wins in overtime and shootouts; 4) goal difference; 5) number of goals scored; 6) drawing of lots.

=== Statistics ===
==== Scoring leaders ====
The following shows the top ten players who led the league in points, at the conclusion of the regular season. If two or more skaters are tied (i.e. same number of points, goals and played games), all of the tied skaters are shown.

Player	Team	GP	G	A	Pts	PIM
(Switzerland) Dominique Rüegg	ZSC Lions Frauen	19	28	17	45	22
(Switzerland) Nina Waidacher	ZSC Lions Frauen	18	12	29	41	77
(Switzerland) Phoebe Stänz	Ladies Team Lugano	15	15	22	37	30
(Switzerland) Romy Eggimann	Ladies Team Lugano	20	25	10	35	12
(Switzerland) Rahel Enzler	SC Reinach Damen	17	8	21	29	6
(Slovakia) Viktoria Maskalova	EV Bomo Thun	20	12	14	26	10
(Czech Republic) Simona Grascher	HC Université Neuchâtel Dames	20	16	8	24	12
(Poland) Kamila Wieczorek	EV Bomo Thun	19	14	8	22	49
(Germany) Jessica Ujcik	EV Bomo Thun	19	8	14	22	36
(Switzerland) Laura Zimmermann	EV Bomo Thun	14	14	6	20	8

==== Leading goaltenders ====
The following shows the top five goaltenders who led the league in goals against average, provided that they have played at least 40% of their team's minutes, at the conclusion of the regular season.

Player	Team(s)	GP	TOI	GA	GAA
(Italy) Giulia Mazzocchi	Ladies Team Lugano	14	833	28	2,02
(France) Caroline Baldin	ZSC Lions Frauen	19	1106	41	2,23
(Switzerland) Laura De Bastiani	SC Reinach Damen	20	1209	50	2,48
(Switzerland) Nina Paiva	HC Université Neuchâtel Dames	13	751	36	2,88
(Switzerland) Saskia Maurer	EV Bomo Thun	18	933	46	2,96

== Playoffs ==
=== Bracket ===
Semi-finals (best-of-5)
1	ZSC Lions Frauen	3
4	SC Reinach Damen	1
2	Ladies Team Lugano	1
3	HC Université Neuchâtel Dames	3

Finals (best-of-5)
1	ZSC Lions Frauen	2
3	HC Université Neuchâtel Dames	0
Game for 3rd place (best-of-1)
2	Ladies Team Lugano	2
4	SC Reinach Damen	7

=== Semi-Finals ===
==== (1) ZSC Lions Frauen vs. (4) SC Reinach Damen ====
22 February	ZSC Lions Frauen	0-3	SC Reinach Damen	Kunsteisbahn Oerlikon, Zürich	Recap
No scoring		First period	No scoring
No scoring		Second period	25:32 - Marty (Enzler); 30:19 - Waser (Thalmann) (PP1); 36:13 - Lutz (Hofstetter, Thalmann) (PP1)
No scoring		Third period	No scoring
Caroline Baldin		Goalie stats	Laura De Bastiani

23 February	SC Reinach Damen	1-3	ZSC Lions Frauen	Kunsteisbahn Oberwynental, Reinach	Recap
No scoring		First period	No scoring
No scoring		Second period	No scoring
46:39 - Enzler		Third period	N. Waidacher - 48:26 Rüedi - 51:06; N. Waidacher - 58:56 (EN)
Laura De Bastiani		Goalie stats	Caroline Baldin

29 February	ZSC Lions Frauen	2-1	3OT	SC Reinach Damen	Kunsteisbahn Oerlikon, Zürich	Recap
No scoring		First period		No scoring
Rüedi (Zimmermann) - 24:36		Second period		34:20 - Marty (Enzler) (SH1)
No scoring		Third period		No scoring
N. Waidacher (PS)		Third overtime period		No scoring
Caroline Baldin		Goalie stats		Laura De Bastiani

1 March	SC Reinach Damen	1-2	ZSC Lions Frauen	Kunsteisbahn Oberwynental, Reinach	Recap
No scoring		First period	I. Waidacher (Rüegg) (SH1) - 17:02
38:02 - Enzler		Second period	No scoring
No scoring		Third period	N. Waidacher - 54:24
Laura De Bastiani		Goalie stats	Caroline Baldin

ZSC Lions Frauen won the series 3–1.

==== (2) Ladies Team Lugano vs. (3) HC Université Neuchâtel Dames ====
22 February	Ladies Team Lugano	2-1	HC Université Neuchâtel Dames	La Resega, Lugano	Recap
Eggimann (Ryser) (PP1) - 9:43		First period	No scoring
Eggimann - 24:06		Second period	No scoring
No scoring		Third period	49:20 - Pélissou (Joray)
Giulia Mazzocchi		Goalie stats	Nina Paiva

23 February	HC Université Neuchâtel Dames	1-0	Ladies Team Lugano	Patinoire du Littoral, Neuchâtel	Recap
No scoring		First period	No scoring
No scoring		Second period	No scoring
44:26 - Desvignes (Grascher, Joray)		Third period	No scoring
Nina Paiva		Goalie stats	Giulia Mazzocchi

29 February	Ladies Team Lugano	0-3	HC Université Neuchâtel Dames	La Resega, Lugano	Recap
12:30 - Grascher (Gendarme); 14:39 - Gremaud (Desvignes, Dale) (PP1)		First period	No scoring
No scoring		Second period	24:15 - Huwiler (Desvignes, Dale)
No scoring		Third period	No scoring
Giulia Mazzocchi		Goalie stats	Nina Paiva

1 March	HC Université Neuchâtel Dames	4-3	3OT	Ladies Team Lugano	Patinoire du Littoral, Neuchâtel	Recap
18:34 - Joray (Pélissou) (PP1)		First period		Muraro (Stocker, Desboeufs) - 14:39
33:15 - Gendarme (E. Ingold, Joray); 38:21 - Huwiler (E. Ingold)		Second period		Stocker (Bullo, Vallario) (PP1) - 27:08
No scoring		Third period		Ryser (Vallario) - 51:45
Grascher (PS)		Third overtime period		No scoring
Nina Paiva		Goalie stats		Giulia Mazzocchi

HC Université Neuchâtel Dames won the series 3–1.

=== Game for 3rd place ===
7 March	Ladies Team Lugano	2-7	SC Reinach Damen	La Resega, Lugano	Recap
Bullo - 15:53		First period	3:55 - Lutz (Fischer); 10:44 - R. Bräm (Marty)
Vallario - 36:59		Second period	29:51 - Marty (R. Bräm); 32:42 - Marty (Fischer)
No scoring		Third period	46:49 - Hofstetter (Enzler) (PP1); 49:01 - Marty; 56:13 - Nienaber (Marty, Fischer) (PP1)
Giulia Mazzocchi		Goalie stats	Laura De Bastiani

SC Reinach Damen won the game and finish at the 3rd place.

=== Finals ===
7 March	ZSC Lions Frauen	5-1	HC Université Neuchâtel Dames	Kunsteisbahn Oerlikon, Zürich	Recap
No scoring		First period	4:55 - Grascher (Joray, Desvignes) (PP1)
N. Waidacher (Lasis) (PP1) - 32:43; Rüedi (Zimmermann) - 33:10; Rüegg (Scheurer) - 38:28		Second period	No scoring
Christen (Rüegg) - 51:50; Rüegg (I. Waidacher) - 55:38		Third period	No scoring
Caroline Baldin		Goalie stats	Nina Paiva

8 March	HC Université Neuchâtel Dames	0-3	ZSC Lions Frauen	Patinoire du Littoral, Neuchâtel	Recap
No scoring		First period	No scoring
No scoring		Second period	Rüedi (Schlegel) - 24:12; Rüegg (I. Waidacher) (SH1) - 30:04
No scoring		Third period	Rüegg (I. Waidacher) - 40:51
Nina Paiva		Goalie stats	Caroline Baldin

The series is interrupted after two games, due to the COVID-19 pandemic.

== Play-outs ==
22 February	EV Bomo Thun	3-1	SC Weinfelden Ladies	Kunsteisbahn Grabengut, Thun	Recap
Wieczorek (S. Minder) - 1:58; Ujcik (Zimmermann) - 11:53		First period	No scoring
No scoring		Second period	30:43 - Leemann (Ehrbar)
Saletta (Gerber) - 48:36		Third period	No scoring
Saskia Maurer		Goalie stats	Caroline Lambert

29 February	SC Weinfelden Ladies	2-6	EV Bomo Thun	Güttingersreuti, Weinfelden	Recap
Confidenti (Michielin, Krause) - 4:25		First period	6:32 - Zimmermann (Ujcik); 16:44 - Ujcik (Schranz)
Daneel (Confidenti) - 30:47		Second period	25:31 - Ujcik (Maskalova) (PP1); 36:08 - Saletta
No scoring		Third period	47:03 - Zimmermann; 56:27 - Gerber (Saletta)
Caroline Lambert		Goalie stats	Saskia Maurer

1 March	EV Bomo Thun	8-1	SC Weinfelden Ladies	Kunsteisbahn Grabengut, Thun	Recap
Saletta - 1:36; Wieczorek (S. Minder) - 4:31; Wieczorek (Maskalova) - 6:43; Wieczorek - 18:58		First period	5:17 - Sigrist (Leemann)
Brand (Wieczorek) - 23:01; Gerber (Wieczorek) (PP1) - 32:07		Second period	No scoring
Maskalova (Zimmermann, Wieczorek) (PP1) - 46:53; Zimmermann (Saletta) (SH1) - 59:53		Third period	No scoring
Saskia Maurer; Nubya Aeschlimann		Goalie stats	Caroline Lambert

EV Bomo Thun won the series 3–0.

EV Bomo Thun saves its place in SWHL A by winning the Play-outs.

== Promotion/Relegation ==
The planned series between SC Weinfelden Ladies and SC Langenthal Ladies is cancelled due to the COVID-19 pandemic.
