= Margot Huot-Marchand =

French ice hockey player (born 2000)

- Born: 10 June 2000 (age 26) Noisy-le-Grand, France
- Height: 1.60 m (5 ft 3 in)
- Weight: 73 kg (161 lb; 11 st 7 lb)
- Position: Forward
- Shoots: Right
- NDHL team Former teams: Rögle BK: Falu IF; Göteborg HC; HC Université Neuchâtel; Bisons de Neuilly-sur-Marne
- National team: France
- Playing career: 2014–present

Margot Huot-Marchand née Desvignes (French: [maʁɡo ɥɔ maʁʃɑ̃]; born 10 June 2000) is a French ice hockey forward and member of the French national team. She plays in the Swedish Nationella Damhockeyligan (NDHL) with Rögle BK.

== Career ==
Before beginning to play ice hockey at the age of 7, Huot-Marchand was a speed skater. In 2018, she left France to sign with HC Université Neuchâtel in the Swiss Women's Hockey League A (SWHL A).

After two years in Switzerland, Desvignes signed with Göteborg HC in the Swedish Women's Hockey League (SDHL).

=== International ===
She represented France at the 2019 IIHF Women's World Championship.

== Career statistics ==
			Regular Season					Playoffs
Season	Team	League	GP	G	A	Pts	PIM	GP	G	A	Pts	PIM
2014–15	Bisonnes de Neuilly-sur-Marne	FFHG Féminin Élite	7	1	1	2	8	3	1	1	2	4
2015–16	Bisonnes de Neuilly-sur-Marne	FFHG Féminin Élite	10	9	10	19	26	3	1	0	1	14
2016–17	Bisonnes de Neuilly-sur-Marne	FFHG Féminin Élite	11	11	16	27	46	-	-	-	-	-
2017–18	Bisonnes de Neuilly-sur-Marne	FFHG Féminin Élite	9	10	5	15	18	-	-	-	-	-
2018–19	HC Université Neuchâtel	SWHL A	20	9	8	17	46	5	1	1	2	10
2019–20	HC Université Neuchâtel	SWHL A	18	10	4	14	32	6	1	2	3	20
SWHL A totals			38	19	12	31	78	11	2	3	5	30
