= Monika Waidacher =

Swiss ice hockey player

- Born: 9 July 1990 (age 36) Zürich, Switzerland
- Height: 5 ft 8 in (173 cm)
- Weight: 154 lb (70 kg; 11 st 0 lb)
- Position: Forward
- Shoots: Left
- LNA team Former teams: ZSC Lions; DSC Oberthurgau; EHC Chur; St. Scholastica Saints
- National team: Switzerland
- Playing career: 2004–present
Medal record
Women's ice hockey
Representing Switzerland
World Championships
| Bronze medal – third place | 2012 United States |

Monika Waidacher (born 9 July 1990) is a Swiss ice hockey player for ZSC Lions and the Swiss national team.

== Playing career ==
She participated at the 2015 IIHF Women's World Championship.

== Career statistics ==
=== Club ===
| | | | Regular season | | | | | Playoffs |
| Season | Team | League | GP | G | A | Pts | PIM | GP | G | A | Pts | PIM |
|---|---|---|---|---|---|---|---|---|---|---|---|---|
| 2004-05 | DSC Oberthurgau | SWHL A | - | - | - | - | - | - | - | - | - | - |
| 2006-07 | DSC Oberthurgau | SWHL A | - | - | - | - | - | - | - | - | - | - |
| 2007-08 | EHC Chur Capricorns Damen | SWHL C | 12 | 47 | 17 | 64 | 30 | - | - | - | - | - |
| 2008-09 | ZSC Lions Frauen | SWHL A | 22 | 11 | 5 | 16 | 30 | 3 | 0 | 2 | 2 | 4 |
| 2009-10 | ZSC Lions Frauen | SWHL A | 17 | 7 | 9 | 16 | 8 | 3 | 0 | 0 | 0 | 2 |
| 2010-11 | College of St. Scholastica | NCAA III | 25 | 3 | 0 | 3 | 10 | - | - | - | - | - |
| 2011-12 | College of St. Scholastica | NCAA III | 24 | 11 | 18 | 29 | 8 | - | - | - | - | - |
| 2012-13 | College of St. Scholastica | NCAA III | 25 | 13 | 12 | 25 | 14 | - | - | - | - | - |
| 2013-14 | College of St. Scholastica | NCAA III | 26 | 9 | 5 | 14 | 10 | - | - | - | - | - |
| 2014-15 | ZSC Lions Frauen | SWHL A | 19 | 5 | 13 | 18 | 14 | 8 | 1 | 2 | 3 | 2 |
| 2015-16 | ZSC Lions Frauen | SWHL A | 18 | 7 | 11 | 18 | 14 | 7 | 1 | 0 | 1 | 2 |
| 2015-16 | ZSC Lions Frauen | Swiss Women Cup | 2 | 0 | 0 | 0 | 2 | - | - | - | - | - |
| 2016-17 | ZSC Lions Frauen | SWHL A | 20 | 3 | 4 | 7 | 10 | 5 | 0 | 0 | 0 | 0 |
| 2016-17 | ZSC Lions Frauen | Swiss Women Cup | 3 | 3 | 0 | 3 | 2 | - | - | - | - | - |
| 2017-18 | ZSC Lions Frauen | SWHL A | 19 | 6 | 13 | 19 | 8 | 6 | 3 | 2 | 5 | 6 |
| 2017-18 | ZSC Lions Frauen | Swiss Women Cup | 3 | 1 | 3 | 4 | 0 | - | - | - | - | - |
| 2018-19 | ZSC Lions Frauen | SWHL A | 14 | 4 | 5 | 9 | 24 | 7 | 1 | 2 | 3 | 2 |
| 2018-19 | ZSC Lions Frauen | Swiss Women Cup | 3 | 1 | 0 | 1 | 6 | - | - | - | - | - |
| 2019-20 | ZSC Lions Frauen | SWHL A | 18 | 4 | 7 | 11 | 10 | 3 | 0 | 0 | 0 | 0 |
| 2019-20 | ZSC Lions Frauen | Swiss Women Cup | 3 | 0 | 1 | 1 | 2 | - | - | - | - | - |
| 2020-21 | ZSC Lions Frauen | SWHL A | 0 | 0 | 0 | 0 | 0 | - | - | - | - | - |
| 2022-23 | EHC Wallisellen Lions Frauen | SWHL C | 13 | 24 | 21 | 45 | 2 | - | - | - | - | - |
| 2023-24 | EHC Wallisellen Lions Frauen | SWHL C | 12 | 26 | 15 | 41 | 2 | 1 | 0 | 0 | 0 | 2 |
| SWHL A totals | | | 147 | 47 | 67 | 114 | 118 | 42 | 6 | 8 | 14 | 18 |

=== International ===
| Year | Team | Event | GP | G | A | Pts | PIM |
|---|---|---|---|---|---|---|---|
| 2008 | Switzerland U18 | WJC18 | 5 | 0 | 1 | 1 | 2 |
| 2009 | Switzerland | WC | 4 | 0 | 0 | 0 | 0 |
| 2010 | Switzerland | OG | 0 | 0 | 0 | 0 | 0 |
| 2012 | Switzerland | WC | 6 | 0 | 0 | 0 | 2 |
| 2013 | Switzerland | WC | 5 | 0 | 0 | 0 | 0 |
| 2015 | Switzerland | WC | 4 | 0 | 0 | 0 | 2 |
| 2016 | Switzerland | WC | 5 | 0 | 0 | 0 | 0 |
| 2017 | Switzerland | WC | 6 | 0 | 0 | 0 | 0 |
| 2018 | Switzerland | OG | 6 | 0 | 0 | 0 | 0 |
| Junior totals | | | 5 | 0 | 1 | 1 | 2 |
| WC totals | | | 30 | 0 | 0 | 0 | 4 |
| OG totals | | | 6 | 0 | 0 | 0 | 0 |

== Honours and achievements ==
=== SWHL-A ===
- 2015-2016 : Champion with ZSC Lions Frauen
- 2016-2017 : Champion with ZSC Lions Frauen
- 2017-2018 : Champion with ZSC Lions Frauen

=== Swiss Women Cup ===
- 2015-2016 : Cup Winner with ZSC Lions Frauen
- 2017-2018 : Cup Winner with ZSC Lions Frauen
- 2018-2019 : Cup Winner with ZSC Lions Frauen
- 2019-2020 : Cup Winner with ZSC Lions Frauen

=== WC ===
- 2012 : Bronze Medal

== Personal life ==
Her sisters Isabel Waidacher and Nina Waidacher are also hockey players.
