= Ice hockey at the 2014 Winter Olympics – Men's team rosters =

These were the team rosters of the nations participating in the men's ice hockey tournament of the 2014 Winter Olympics. Each team was permitted a roster of 22 skaters and 3 goaltenders.

== Group A ==
=== Russia ===
The following is the Russian roster in the men's ice hockey tournament of the 2014 Winter Olympics.

Head coach: (Russia) Zinetula Bilyaletdinov Assistant coach: (Russia) Valery Belov

No.	Pos.	Name	Height	Weight	Birthdate	Birthplace	2013–14 team
1	G	Semyon Varlamov	185 cm (6 ft 1 in)	85 kg (187 lb)	27 April 1988	Kuybyshev, Soviet Union	(United States) Colorado Avalanche (NHL)
5	D	Ilya Nikulin	191 cm (6 ft 3 in)	98 kg (216 lb)	12 March 1982	Moscow, Soviet Union	(Russia) Ak Bars Kazan (KHL)
6	D	Nikita Nikitin	193 cm (6 ft 4 in)	89 kg (196 lb)	16 June 1986	Omsk, Soviet Union	(United States) Columbus Blue Jackets (NHL)
8	F	Alexander Ovechkin – A	189 cm (6 ft 2 in)	99 kg (218 lb)	17 September 1985	Moscow, Soviet Union	(United States) Washington Capitals (NHL)
10	F	Viktor Tikhonov	188 cm (6 ft 2 in)	83 kg (183 lb)	12 May 1988	Riga, Latvian SSR, Soviet Union	(Russia) SKA Saint Petersburg (KHL)
11	F	Evgeni Malkin	192 cm (6 ft 4 in)	86 kg (190 lb)	31 July 1986	Magnitogorsk, Soviet Union	(United States) Pittsburgh Penguins (NHL)
13	F	Pavel Datsyuk – C	180 cm (5 ft 11 in)	86 kg (190 lb)	20 July 1978	Sverdlovsk, Soviet Union	(United States) Detroit Red Wings (NHL)
15	F	Alexander Svitov	192 cm (6 ft 4 in)	106 kg (234 lb)	3 November 1982	Omsk, Soviet Union	(Russia) Ak Bars Kazan (KHL)
24	F	Alexander Popov	178 cm (5 ft 10 in)	82 kg (181 lb)	31 August 1980	Angarsk, Soviet Union	(Russia) Avangard Omsk (KHL)
26	D	Vyacheslav Voynov	180 cm (5 ft 11 in)	83 kg (183 lb)	15 January 1990	Chelyabinsk, Soviet Union	(United States) Los Angeles Kings (NHL)
27	F	Alexei Tereshchenko	180 cm (5 ft 11 in)	80 kg (176 lb)	16 December 1980	Mozhaisk, Soviet Union	(Russia) Ak Bars Kazan (KHL)
28	F	Alexander Semin	189 cm (6 ft 2 in)	95 kg (209 lb)	3 March 1984	Krasnoyarsk, Soviet Union	(United States) Carolina Hurricanes (NHL)
30	G	Alexander Yeryomenko	179 cm (5 ft 10 in)	75 kg (165 lb)	10 April 1980	Moscow, Soviet Union	(Russia) Dynamo Moscow (KHL)
41	F	Nikolai Kulemin	185 cm (6 ft 1 in)	100 kg (220 lb)	14 July 1986	Magnitogorsk, Soviet Union	(Canada) Toronto Maple Leafs (NHL)
42	F	Artem Anisimov	193 cm (6 ft 4 in)	88 kg (194 lb)	24 May 1988	Yaroslavl, Soviet Union	(United States) Columbus Blue Jackets (NHL)
43	F	Valeri Nichushkin	190 cm (6 ft 3 in)	80 kg (176 lb)	4 March 1995	Chelyabinsk	(United States) Dallas Stars (NHL)
47	F	Alexander Radulov	186 cm (6 ft 1 in)	91 kg (201 lb)	5 July 1986	Nizhny Tagil, Soviet Union	(Russia) CSKA Moscow (KHL)
51	D	Fedor Tyutin	188 cm (6 ft 2 in)	95 kg (209 lb)	19 July 1983	Izhevsk, Soviet Union	(United States) Columbus Blue Jackets (NHL)
71	F	Ilya Kovalchuk – A	188 cm (6 ft 2 in)	104 kg (229 lb)	15 April 1983	Kalinin, Soviet Union	(Russia) SKA Saint Petersburg (KHL)
72	G	Sergei Bobrovsky	188 cm (6 ft 2 in)	86 kg (190 lb)	20 September 1988	Novokuznetsk, Soviet Union	(United States) Columbus Blue Jackets (NHL)
74	D	Alexei Emelin	185 cm (6 ft 1 in)	97 kg (214 lb)	25 April 1986	Togliatti, Soviet Union	(Canada) Montreal Canadiens (NHL)
77	D	Anton Belov	192 cm (6 ft 4 in)	96 kg (212 lb)	29 July 1986	Ryazan, Soviet Union	(Canada) Edmonton Oilers (NHL)
79	D	Andrei Markov	183 cm (6 ft 0 in)	92 kg (203 lb)	20 December 1978	Voskresensk, Soviet Union	(Canada) Montreal Canadiens (NHL)
82	D	Yevgeny Medvedev	190 cm (6 ft 3 in)	87 kg (192 lb)	27 August 1982	Chelyabinsk, Soviet Union	(Russia) Ak Bars Kazan (KHL)
91	F	Vladimir Tarasenko	184 cm (6 ft 0 in)	95 kg (209 lb)	13 December 1991	Yaroslavl, Soviet Union	(United States) St. Louis Blues (NHL)

=== Slovakia ===
The following is the Slovak roster in the men's ice hockey tournament of the 2014 Winter Olympics.

No.	Pos.	Name	Height	Weight	Birthdate	Birthplace	2013–14 team
7	D	Ivan Baranka	191 cm (6 ft 3 in)	91 kg (201 lb)	19 May 1985	Ilava	(Russia) Avangard Omsk (KHL)
13	F	Tomáš Jurčo	188 cm (6 ft 2 in)	88 kg (194 lb)	28 December 1992	Košice	(United States) Detroit Red Wings (NHL)
14	D	Andrej Meszároš	188 cm (6 ft 2 in)	100 kg (220 lb)	13 October 1985	Považská Bystrica	(United States) Philadelphia Flyers (NHL)
19	D	Tomáš Starosta	183 cm (6 ft 0 in)	90 kg (200 lb)	20 May 1981	Trenčín	(Russia) Yugra Khanty-Mansiysk (KHL)
23	D	René Vydarený	186 cm (6 ft 1 in)	92 kg (203 lb)	6 May 1981	Bratislava	(Czech Republic) Hradec Králové (CZE)
26	F	Michal Handzuš – A	196 cm (6 ft 5 in)	98 kg (216 lb)	11 March 1977	Banská Bystrica	(United States) Chicago Blackhawks (NHL)
28	F	Richard Pánik	187 cm (6 ft 2 in)	94 kg (207 lb)	7 February 1991	Martin	(United States) Tampa Bay Lightning (NHL)
31	G	Peter Budaj	185 cm (6 ft 1 in)	87 kg (192 lb)	18 September 1982	Banská Bystrica	(Canada) Montreal Canadiens (NHL)
33	D	Zdeno Chára – C	206 cm (6 ft 9 in)	116 kg (256 lb)	18 March 1977	Trenčín	(United States) Boston Bruins (NHL)
41	G	Jaroslav Halák	179 cm (5 ft 10 in)	84 kg (185 lb)	13 May 1985	Bratislava	(United States) St. Louis Blues (NHL)
43	F	Tomáš Surový	186 cm (6 ft 1 in)	98 kg (216 lb)	24 September 1981	Banská Bystrica	(Belarus) Dinamo Minsk (KHL)
44	D	Andrej Sekera	183 cm (6 ft 0 in)	91 kg (201 lb)	8 June 1986	Bojnice	(United States) Carolina Hurricanes (NHL)
50	G	Ján Laco	180 cm (5 ft 11 in)	83 kg (183 lb)	1 December 1981	Liptovský Mikuláš	(Ukraine) Donbass Donetsk (KHL)
52	D	Martin Marinčin	193 cm (6 ft 4 in)	85 kg (187 lb)	18 February 1992	Košice	(Canada) Edmonton Oilers (NHL)
61	F	Milan Bartovič	182 cm (6 ft 0 in)	88 kg (194 lb)	9 April 1981	Trenčín	(Slovakia) Slovan Bratislava (KHL)
65	F	Tomáš Marcinko	193 cm (6 ft 4 in)	94 kg (207 lb)	11 April 1988	Poprad	(Slovakia) HC Košice (SVK)
67	F	Tomáš Záborský	181 cm (5 ft 11 in)	91 kg (201 lb)	14 November 1987	Trenčín	(Russia) Salavat Yulaev Ufa (KHL)
68	D	Milan Jurčina	193 cm (6 ft 4 in)	114 kg (251 lb)	7 June 1983	Liptovský Mikuláš	(Finland) TPS Turku (FIN)
81	F	Marián Hossa – A	187 cm (6 ft 2 in)	95 kg (209 lb)	12 January 1979	Stará Ľubovňa	(United States) Chicago Blackhawks (NHL)
82	F	Tomáš Kopecký	190 cm (6 ft 3 in)	92 kg (203 lb)	5 February 1982	Ilava	(United States) Florida Panthers (NHL)
85	F	Peter Ölvecký	188 cm (6 ft 2 in)	97 kg (214 lb)	11 October 1985	Nové Zámky	(Slovakia) Slovan Bratislava (KHL)
88	F	Marcel Hossa	187 cm (6 ft 2 in)	99 kg (218 lb)	12 October 1981	Ilava	(Latvia) Dinamo Riga (KHL)
90	F	Tomáš Tatar	178 cm (5 ft 10 in)	84 kg (185 lb)	1 December 1990	Ilava	(United States) Detroit Red Wings (NHL)
91	F	Michel Miklík	184 cm (6 ft 0 in)	90 kg (200 lb)	31 July 1982	Piešťany	(Slovakia) Slovan Bratislava (KHL)
92	F	Branko Radivojevič	187 cm (6 ft 2 in)	93 kg (205 lb)	24 November 1980	Piešťany	(Slovakia) Slovan Bratislava (KHL)

Forward Marián Gáborík was also selected but was unable to play due to injury.

=== Slovenia ===
The following is the Slovenian roster in the men's ice hockey tournament of the 2014 Winter Olympics.

No.	Pos.	Name	Height	Weight	Birthdate	Birthplace	2013–14 team
1	G	Andrej Hočevar	183 cm (6 ft 0 in)	83 kg (183 lb)	21 November 1984	Ljubljana	(France) Dauphins d'Épinal (FRA)
4	D	Andrej Tavželj	188 cm (6 ft 2 in)	95 kg (209 lb)	14 March 1984	Jesenice	(France) Dragons de Rouen (FRA)
7	D	Klemen Pretnar	180 cm (5 ft 11 in)	82 kg (181 lb)	31 August 1986	Bled	(Austria) VSV (AUT)
8	F	Žiga Jeglič	185 cm (6 ft 1 in)	80 kg (180 lb)	24 February 1988	Kranj	(Germany) Ingolstadt (DEL)
9	F	Tomaž Razingar – C	186 cm (6 ft 1 in)	98 kg (216 lb)	25 April 1979	Jesenice	(Sweden) Troja/Ljungby (SWE-2)
11	F	Anže Kopitar – A	193 cm (6 ft 4 in)	103 kg (227 lb)	24 August 1987	Jesenice	(United States) Los Angeles Kings (NHL)
12	F	David Rodman	185 cm (6 ft 1 in)	83 kg (183 lb)	10 September 1983	Jesenice	(Sweden) Oskarshamn (SWE-2)
14	D	Matic Podlipnik	180 cm (5 ft 11 in)	82 kg (181 lb)	9 August 1992	Jesenice	(Czech Republic) Dukla Jihlava (CZE-2)
15	D	Blaž Gregorc	190 cm (6 ft 3 in)	95 kg (209 lb)	18 January 1990	Jesenice	(Czech Republic) Pardubice (CZE)
16	F	Aleš Mušič	176 cm (5 ft 9 in)	82 kg (181 lb)	28 June 1982	Ljubljana	(Slovenia) Olimpija Ljubljana (AUT)
17	D	Žiga Pavlin	193 cm (6 ft 4 in)	97 kg (214 lb)	30 April 1985	Kranj	(Sweden) Troja/Ljungby (SWE-2)
19	F	Žiga Pance	185 cm (6 ft 1 in)	89 kg (196 lb)	1 January 1989	Ljubljana	(Italy) Bolzano-Bozen Foxes (AUT)
22	F	Marcel Rodman – A	186 cm (6 ft 1 in)	85 kg (187 lb)	25 September 1981	Jesenice	(Germany) Schwenninger Wild Wings (DEL)
24	F	Rok Tičar	180 cm (5 ft 11 in)	82 kg (181 lb)	3 May 1989	Jesenice	(Germany) Kölner Haie (DEL)
26	F	Jan Urbas	192 cm (6 ft 4 in)	98 kg (216 lb)	26 January 1989	Ljubljana	(Germany) Red Bull München (DEL)
28	D	Aleš Kranjc	182 cm (6 ft 0 in)	91 kg (201 lb)	29 July 1981	Jesenice	(Germany) Kölner Haie (DEL)
33	G	Robert Kristan	182 cm (6 ft 0 in)	85 kg (187 lb)	4 April 1983	Jesenice	(Slovakia) Nitra (SVK)
39	F	Jan Muršak	180 cm (5 ft 11 in)	85 kg (187 lb)	20 January 1988	Maribor	(Russia) CSKA Moscow (KHL)
40	G	Luka Gračnar	179 cm (5 ft 10 in)	85 kg (187 lb)	31 October 1993	Jesenice	(Austria) Red Bull Salzburg (AUT)
51	D	Mitja Robar	177 cm (5 ft 10 in)	86 kg (190 lb)	4 January 1983	Maribor	(Germany) Krefeld Pinguine (DEL)
55	F	Robert Sabolič	183 cm (6 ft 0 in)	90 kg (200 lb)	18 September 1988	Jesenice	(Germany) Ingolstadt (DEL)
71	F	Bostjan Goličič	183 cm (6 ft 0 in)	88 kg (194 lb)	12 June 1989	Kranj	(France) Diables Rouges de Briançon (FRA)
86	D	Sabahudin Kovačevič	190 cm (6 ft 3 in)	95 kg (209 lb)	26 February 1986	Jesenice	(Kazakhstan) Saryarka Karagandy (VHL)
91	F	Miha Verlič	194 cm (6 ft 4 in)	86 kg (190 lb)	21 August 1991	Maribor	(Slovenia) Olimpija Ljubljana (AUT)
92	F	Anže Kuralt	175 cm (5 ft 9 in)	80 kg (180 lb)	31 October 1991	Kranj	(France) Dauphins d'Épinal (FRA)

=== United States ===
The following is the American roster in the men's ice hockey tournament of the 2014 Winter Olympics.

No.	Pos.	Name	Height	Weight	Birthdate	Birthplace	2013–14 team
3	D	Cam Fowler	6 ft 1 in (185 cm)	196 lb (89 kg)	5 December 1991	Windsor, ON	(United States) Anaheim Ducks (NHL)
4	D	John Carlson	6 ft 3 in (191 cm)	212 lb (96 kg)	10 January 1990	Colonia, NJ	(United States) Washington Capitals (NHL)
7	D	Paul Martin	6 ft 1 in (185 cm)	200 lb (91 kg)	5 March 1981	Elk River, MN	(United States) Pittsburgh Penguins (NHL)
8	F	Joe Pavelski	5 ft 11 in (180 cm)	190 lb (86 kg)	11 July 1984	Plover, WI	(United States) San Jose Sharks (NHL)
9	F	Zach Parise – C	5 ft 11 in (180 cm)	190 lb (86 kg)	28 July 1984	Prior Lake, MN	(United States) Minnesota Wild (NHL)
12	F	Derek Stepan	6 ft 1 in (185 cm)	196 lb (89 kg)	18 June 1990	Hastings, MN	(United States) New York Rangers (NHL)
17	F	Ryan Kesler	6 ft 2 in (188 cm)	202 lb (92 kg)	31 August 1984	Livonia, MI	(Canada) Vancouver Canucks (NHL)
20	D	Ryan Suter – A	6 ft 1 in (185 cm)	198 lb (90 kg)	21 January 1985	Madison, WI	(United States) Minnesota Wild (NHL)
21	F	James van Riemsdyk	6 ft 3 in (191 cm)	200 lb (91 kg)	4 May 1989	Middletown, NJ	(Canada) Toronto Maple Leafs (NHL)
22	D	Kevin Shattenkirk	5 ft 11 in (180 cm)	207 lb (94 kg)	29 January 1989	Greenwich, CT	(United States) St. Louis Blues (NHL)
23	F	Dustin Brown – A	6 ft 1 in (185 cm)	212 lb (96 kg)	4 November 1984	Ithaca, NY	(United States) Los Angeles Kings (NHL)
24	F	Ryan Callahan	5 ft 11 in (180 cm)	180 lb (82 kg)	21 March 1985	Rochester, NY	(United States) New York Rangers (NHL)
26	F	Paul Stastny	6 ft 1 in (185 cm)	205 lb (93 kg)	27 December 1985	Quebec City, QC	(United States) Colorado Avalanche (NHL)
27	D	Ryan McDonagh	6 ft 1 in (185 cm)	213 lb (97 kg)	13 June 1989	St. Paul, MN	(United States) New York Rangers (NHL)
28	F	Blake Wheeler	6 ft 5 in (196 cm)	205 lb (93 kg)	31 August 1986	Robbinsdale, MN	(Canada) Winnipeg Jets (NHL)
32	G	Jonathan Quick	6 ft 1 in (185 cm)	218 lb (99 kg)	21 January 1986	Milford, CT	(United States) Los Angeles Kings (NHL)
35	G	Jimmy Howard	6 ft 0 in (183 cm)	218 lb (99 kg)	26 March 1984	Syracuse, NY	(United States) Detroit Red Wings (NHL)
39	G	Ryan Miller	6 ft 2 in (188 cm)	175 lb (79 kg)	17 July 1980	East Lansing, MI	(United States) Buffalo Sabres (NHL)
42	F	David Backes	6 ft 3 in (191 cm)	221 lb (100 kg)	1 May 1984	Minneapolis, MN	(United States) St. Louis Blues (NHL)
44	D	Brooks Orpik	6 ft 2 in (188 cm)	219 lb (99 kg)	26 September 1980	San Francisco, CA	(United States) Pittsburgh Penguins (NHL)
67	F	Max Pacioretty	6 ft 2 in (188 cm)	219 lb (99 kg)	20 November 1988	New Canaan, CT	(Canada) Montreal Canadiens (NHL)
72	D	Justin Faulk	6 ft 0 in (183 cm)	215 lb (98 kg)	20 March 1992	S. St. Paul, MN	(United States) Carolina Hurricanes (NHL)
74	F	T. J. Oshie	5 ft 11 in (180 cm)	189 lb (86 kg)	23 December 1986	Everett, WA	(United States) St. Louis Blues (NHL)
81	F	Phil Kessel	6 ft 1 in (185 cm)	202 lb (92 kg)	2 October 1987	Madison, WI	(Canada) Toronto Maple Leafs (NHL)
88	F	Patrick Kane	5 ft 11 in (180 cm)	181 lb (82 kg)	19 November 1988	Buffalo, NY	(United States) Chicago Blackhawks (NHL)

== Group B ==
=== Austria ===
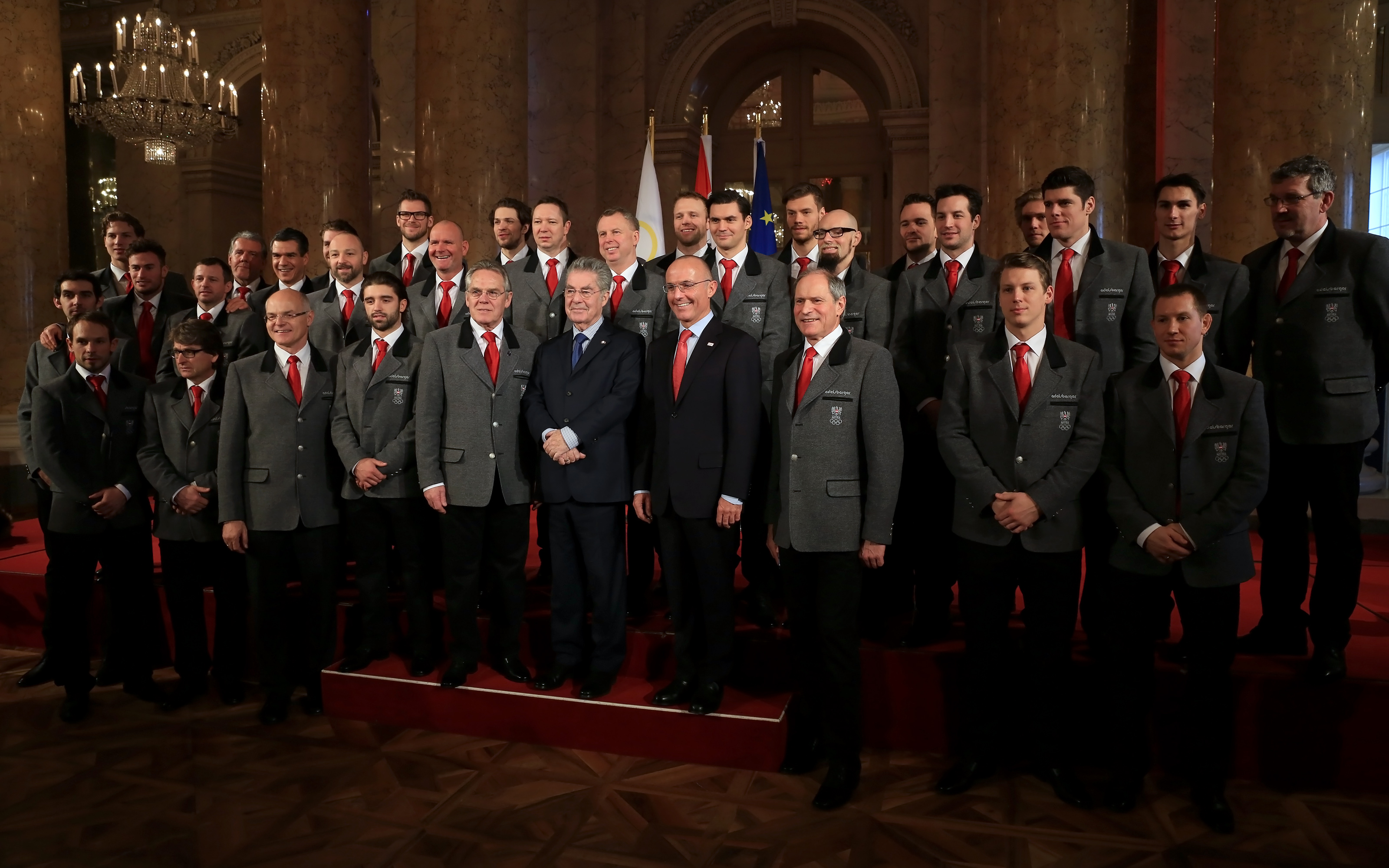
The Austrian ice hockey team

The following is the Austrian roster in the men's ice hockey tournament of the 2014 Winter Olympics.

No.	Pos.	Name	Height	Weight	Birthdate	Birthplace	2013–14 team
4	D	Gerhard Unterluggauer	177 cm (5 ft 10 in)	88 kg (194 lb)	15 August 1976	Villach	(Austria) Villacher SV (AUT)
5	F	Thomas Raffl	194 cm (6 ft 4 in)	97 kg (214 lb)	19 June 1986	Villach	(Austria) Red Bull Salzburg (AUT)
7	D	Stefan Ulmer	176 cm (5 ft 9 in)	72 kg (159 lb)	1 December 1990	Dornbirn	(Switzerland) HC Lugano (NLA)
10	F	Daniel Oberkofler	183 cm (6 ft 0 in)	74 kg (163 lb)	16 July 1988	Graz	(Austria) Black Wings Linz (AUT)
12	F	Michael Raffl	185 cm (6 ft 1 in)	87 kg (192 lb)	1 December 1988	Villach	(United States) Philadelphia Flyers (NHL)
14	F	Andreas Nödl	187 cm (6 ft 2 in)	90 kg (200 lb)	28 February 1987	Vienna	(Austria) Red Bull Salzburg (AUT)
15	F	Manuel Latusa	182 cm (6 ft 0 in)	88 kg (194 lb)	23 January 1984	Vienna	(Austria) Red Bull Salzburg (AUT)
18	F	Thomas Koch – A	173 cm (5 ft 8 in)	77 kg (170 lb)	17 August 1983	Klagenfurt	(Austria) Klagenfurter AC (AUT)
20	F	Daniel Welser	180 cm (5 ft 11 in)	86 kg (190 lb)	16 February 1983	Klagenfurt	(Austria) Red Bull Salzburg (AUT)
22	D	Thomas Pöck	186 cm (6 ft 1 in)	93 kg (205 lb)	2 December 1981	Klagenfurt	(Austria) Klagenfurter AC (AUT)
24	G	Mathias Lange	178 cm (5 ft 10 in)	82 kg (181 lb)	13 April 1985	Klagenfurt	(Germany) Iserlohn Roosters (GER)
25	F	Matthias Iberer	188 cm (6 ft 2 in)	91 kg (201 lb)	29 April 1985	Graz	(Austria) Black Wings Linz (AUT)
26	F	Thomas Vanek – C	188 cm (6 ft 2 in)	94 kg (207 lb)	19 January 1984	Baden bei Wien	(United States) New York Islanders (NHL)
27	F	Thomas Hundertpfund	189 cm (6 ft 2 in)	85 kg (187 lb)	14 December 1989	Klagenfurt	(Sweden) Timrå IK (SWE-2)
29	G	Bernhard Starkbaum	186 cm (6 ft 1 in)	89 kg (196 lb)	19 February 1986	Vienna	(Sweden) Brynäs IF (SHL)
30	G	René Swette	183 cm (6 ft 0 in)	82 kg (181 lb)	21 August 1988	Lustenau	(Austria) Klagenfurter AC (AUT)
40	F	Michael René Grabner	185 cm (6 ft 1 in)	85 kg (187 lb)	5 October 1987	Villach	(United States) New York Islanders (NHL)
41	D	Mario Altmann	194 cm (6 ft 4 in)	98 kg (216 lb)	4 November 1986	Vienna	(Austria) Villacher SV (AUT)
48	D	Florian Iberer	185 cm (6 ft 1 in)	95 kg (209 lb)	7 December 1982	Graz	(Austria) Klagenfurter AC (AUT)
51	D	Matthias Trattnig – A	185 cm (6 ft 1 in)	96 kg (212 lb)	22 April 1979	Graz	(Austria) Red Bull Salzburg (AUT)
55	D	Robert Lukas	177 cm (5 ft 10 in)	84 kg (185 lb)	29 August 1978	Vienna	(Austria) Black Wings Linz (AUT)
64	D	Andre Lakos	200 cm (6 ft 7 in)	107 kg (236 lb)	29 July 1979	Vienna	(Austria) Vienna Capitals (AUT)
77	F	Brian Lebler	191 cm (6 ft 3 in)	96 kg (212 lb)	16 July 1988	Klagenfurt	(Austria) Black Wings Linz (AUT)
89	F	Raphael Herburger	178 cm (5 ft 10 in)	72 kg (159 lb)	2 January 1989	Dornbirn	(Switzerland) EHC Biel (NLA)
91	F	Oliver Setzinger	183 cm (6 ft 0 in)	89 kg (196 lb)	11 July 1983	Horn	(Switzerland) HC Lausanne (NLA)

=== Canada ===
The following is the Canadian roster for the men's ice hockey tournament at the 2014 Winter Olympics.

No.	Pos.	Name	Height	Weight	Birthdate	Birthplace	2013–14 team
1	G	Roberto Luongo	191 cm (6 ft 3 in)	93 kg (205 lb)	4 April 1979	Montreal, QC	(Canada) Vancouver Canucks (NHL)
2	D	Duncan Keith	183 cm (6 ft 0 in)	85 kg (187 lb)	16 July 1983	Winnipeg, MB	(United States) Chicago Blackhawks (NHL)
5	D	Dan Hamhuis	185 cm (6 ft 1 in)	95 kg (209 lb)	13 December 1982	Smithers, BC	(Canada) Vancouver Canucks (NHL)
6	D	Shea Weber – A	191 cm (6 ft 3 in)	97 kg (214 lb)	14 August 1985	Sicamous, BC	(United States) Nashville Predators (NHL)
8	D	Drew Doughty	185 cm (6 ft 1 in)	92 kg (203 lb)	8 December 1989	London, ON	(United States) Los Angeles Kings (NHL)
9	F	Matt Duchene	180 cm (5 ft 11 in)	91 kg (201 lb)	16 January 1991	Haliburton, ON	(United States) Colorado Avalanche (NHL)
10	F	Patrick Sharp	185 cm (6 ft 1 in)	89 kg (196 lb)	27 December 1981	Winnipeg, MB	(United States) Chicago Blackhawks (NHL)
12	F	Patrick Marleau	188 cm (6 ft 2 in)	100 kg (220 lb)	15 December 1979	Aneroid, SK	(United States) San Jose Sharks (NHL)
14	F	Chris Kunitz	183 cm (6 ft 0 in)	90 kg (200 lb)	26 September 1979	Regina, SK	(United States) Pittsburgh Penguins (NHL)
15	F	Ryan Getzlaf	193 cm (6 ft 4 in)	100 kg (220 lb)	10 May 1985	Regina, SK	(United States) Anaheim Ducks (NHL)
16	F	Jonathan Toews – A	188 cm (6 ft 2 in)	96 kg (212 lb)	29 April 1988	Winnipeg, MB	(United States) Chicago Blackhawks (NHL)
19	D	Jay Bouwmeester	193 cm (6 ft 4 in)	98 kg (216 lb)	27 September 1983	Edmonton, AB	(United States) St. Louis Blues (NHL)
20	F	John Tavares	183 cm (6 ft 0 in)	90 kg (200 lb)	20 September 1990	Mississauga, ON	(United States) New York Islanders (NHL)
22	F	Jamie Benn	188 cm (6 ft 2 in)	93 kg (205 lb)	18 July 1989	Victoria, BC	(United States) Dallas Stars (NHL)
24	F	Corey Perry	191 cm (6 ft 3 in)	95 kg (209 lb)	16 May 1985	Peterborough, ON	(United States) Anaheim Ducks (NHL)
26	F	Martin St. Louis	172 cm (5 ft 8 in)	82 kg (181 lb)	18 June 1975	Laval, QC	(United States) Tampa Bay Lightning (NHL)
27	D	Alex Pietrangelo	191 cm (6 ft 3 in)	93 kg (205 lb)	10 October 1990	King City, ON	(United States) St. Louis Blues (NHL)
31	G	Carey Price	190 cm (6 ft 3 in)	99 kg (218 lb)	16 August 1987	Vancouver, BC	(Canada) Montreal Canadiens (NHL)
37	F	Patrice Bergeron	188 cm (6 ft 2 in)	88 kg (194 lb)	24 July 1985	L'Ancienne-Lorette, QC	(United States) Boston Bruins (NHL)
41	G	Mike Smith	191 cm (6 ft 3 in)	98 kg (216 lb)	22 March 1982	Kingston, ON	(United States) Phoenix Coyotes (NHL)
44	D	Marc-Édouard Vlasic	185 cm (6 ft 1 in)	91 kg (201 lb)	30 March 1987	Montreal, QC	(United States) San Jose Sharks (NHL)
61	F	Rick Nash	193 cm (6 ft 4 in)	99 kg (218 lb)	16 June 1984	Brampton, ON	(United States) New York Rangers (NHL)
76	D	P. K. Subban	183 cm (6 ft 0 in)	98 kg (216 lb)	13 May 1989	Toronto, ON	(Canada) Montreal Canadiens (NHL)
77	F	Jeff Carter	193 cm (6 ft 4 in)	95 kg (209 lb)	1 January 1985	London, ON	(United States) Los Angeles Kings (NHL)
87	F	Sidney Crosby – C	180 cm (5 ft 11 in)	90 kg (200 lb)	7 August 1987	Cole Harbour, NS	(United States) Pittsburgh Penguins (NHL)

Forward Steven Stamkos was also selected but was unable to participate due to injury. He was replaced by Martin St. Louis.

=== Finland ===
The Finnish roster for the men's ice hockey tournament of the 2014 Winter Olympics was published on 7 January 2014. The players were picked by the head coach Erkka Westerlund.

No.	Pos.	Name	Height	Weight	Birthdate	Birthplace	2013–14 team
3	D	Olli Määttä	187 cm (6 ft 2 in)	89 kg (196 lb)	22 August 1994	Jyväskylä	(United States) Pittsburgh Penguins (NHL)
4	D	Ossi Väänänen	191 cm (6 ft 3 in)	99 kg (218 lb)	18 August 1980	Vantaa	(Finland) Jokerit (Liiga)
5	D	Lasse Kukkonen	183 cm (6 ft 0 in)	85 kg (187 lb)	18 September 1981	Oulu	(Finland) Oulun Kärpät (Liiga)
6	D	Sami Salo	190 cm (6 ft 3 in)	93 kg (205 lb)	2 September 1974	Turku	(United States) Tampa Bay Lightning (NHL)
8	F	Teemu Selänne – C	182 cm (6 ft 0 in)	91 kg (201 lb)	3 July 1970	Helsinki	(United States) Anaheim Ducks (NHL)
12	F	Olli Jokinen	187 cm (6 ft 2 in)	91 kg (201 lb)	5 December 1978	Kuopio	(Canada) Winnipeg Jets (NHL)
15	F	Tuomo Ruutu	182 cm (6 ft 0 in)	89 kg (196 lb)	16 February 1983	Vantaa	(United States) Carolina Hurricanes (NHL)
16	F	Aleksander Barkov	190 cm (6 ft 3 in)	91 kg (201 lb)	2 September 1995	Tampere	(United States) Florida Panthers (NHL)
18	D	Sami Lepistö	186 cm (6 ft 1 in)	85 kg (187 lb)	17 October 1984	Espoo	(Russia) Avtomobilist Yekaterinburg (KHL)
21	F	Jori Lehterä	187 cm (6 ft 2 in)	97 kg (214 lb)	23 December 1987	Helsinki	(Russia) HC Sibir Novosibirsk (KHL)
23	F	Sakari Salminen	177 cm (5 ft 10 in)	75 kg (165 lb)	31 May 1988	Pori	(Russia) Torpedo Nizhny Novgorod (KHL)
26	F	Jarkko Immonen	182 cm (6 ft 0 in)	90 kg (200 lb)	19 April 1982	Rantasalmi	(Russia) Torpedo Nizhny Novgorod (KHL)
27	F	Petri Kontiola	182 cm (6 ft 0 in)	92 kg (203 lb)	4 October 1984	Seinäjoki	(Russia) Traktor Chelyabinsk (KHL)
28	F	Lauri Korpikoski	185 cm (6 ft 1 in)	88 kg (194 lb)	28 July 1986	Turku	(United States) Phoenix Coyotes (NHL)
31	G	Antti Niemi	187 cm (6 ft 2 in)	91 kg (201 lb)	29 August 1983	Vantaa	(United States) San Jose Sharks (NHL)
32	G	Kari Lehtonen	193 cm (6 ft 4 in)	91 kg (201 lb)	16 November 1983	Helsinki	(United States) Dallas Stars (NHL)
36	F	Jussi Jokinen	181 cm (5 ft 11 in)	86 kg (190 lb)	1 April 1983	Kalajoki	(United States) Pittsburgh Penguins (NHL)
38	D	Juuso Hietanen	180 cm (5 ft 11 in)	85 kg (187 lb)	14 June 1985	Hämeenlinna	(Russia) Torpedo Nizhny Novgorod (KHL)
40	G	Tuukka Rask	187 cm (6 ft 2 in)	90 kg (200 lb)	10 March 1987	Savonlinna	(United States) Boston Bruins (NHL)
41	F	Antti Pihlström	180 cm (5 ft 11 in)	82 kg (181 lb)	22 October 1984	Vantaa	(Russia) Salavat Yulaev Ufa (KHL)
44	D	Kimmo Timonen – A	177 cm (5 ft 10 in)	84 kg (185 lb)	18 March 1975	Kuopio	(United States) Philadelphia Flyers (NHL)
45	D	Sami Vatanen	177 cm (5 ft 10 in)	79 kg (174 lb)	3 June 1991	Jyväskylä	(United States) Anaheim Ducks (NHL)
50	F	Juhamatti Aaltonen	184 cm (6 ft 0 in)	85 kg (187 lb)	4 June 1985	Ii	(Finland) Oulun Kärpät (Liiga)
64	F	Mikael Granlund	179 cm (5 ft 10 in)	83 kg (183 lb)	26 February 1992	Oulu	(United States) Minnesota Wild (NHL)
71	F	Leo Komarov – A	180 cm (5 ft 11 in)	90 kg (200 lb)	23 January 1987	Narva, Soviet Union	(Russia) HC Dynamo Moscow (KHL)

Forwards Mikko Koivu and Valtteri Filppula were also selected but were unable to participate due to injury. They were replaced by Jarkko Immonen and Sakari Salminen respectively.

=== Norway ===
The following is the Norwegian roster in the men's ice hockey tournament of the 2014 Winter Olympics.

No.	Pos.	Name	Height	Weight	Birthdate	Birthplace	2013–14 team
4	D	Daniel Sørvik	183 cm (6 ft 0 in)	83 kg (183 lb)	11 March 1990	Oslo	(Norway) Vålerenga Ishockey (NOR)
6	D	Jonas Holøs – A	180 cm (5 ft 11 in)	92 kg (203 lb)	27 August 1987	Sarpsborg	(Russia) Lokomotiv Yaroslavl (KHL)
8	F	Mads Hansen	185 cm (6 ft 1 in)	88 kg (194 lb)	16 September 1978	Trondheim	(Norway) Storhamar Dragons (NOR)
13	F	Sondre Olden	194 cm (6 ft 4 in)	88 kg (194 lb)	29 August 1992	Oslo	(Norway) Vålerenga Ishockey (NOR)
19	F	Per-Åge Skrøder	180 cm (5 ft 11 in)	92 kg (203 lb)	4 August 1978	Sarpsborg	(Sweden) Modo Hockey (SHL)
20	F	Anders Bastiansen – A	190 cm (6 ft 3 in)	93 kg (205 lb)	31 October 1980	Oslo	(Sweden) Färjestad BK (SHL)
21	F	Morten Ask	185 cm (6 ft 1 in)	91 kg (201 lb)	14 May 1980	Oslo	(Norway) Vålerenga Ishockey (NOR)
22	F	Martin Røymark	184 cm (6 ft 0 in)	86 kg (190 lb)	10 November 1986	Oslo	(Sweden) Färjestad BK (SHL)
23	D	Mats Trygg	179 cm (5 ft 10 in)	85 kg (187 lb)	1 June 1976	Oslo	(Norway) Lørenskog IK (NOR)
26	F	Kristian Forsberg	185 cm (6 ft 1 in)	92 kg (203 lb)	5 May 1986	Oslo	(Sweden) Modo Hockey (SHL)
28	F	Niklas Roest	174 cm (5 ft 9 in)	80 kg (180 lb)	3 August 1986	Oslo	(Sweden) BIK Karlskoga (SWE-2)
29	F	Robin Dahlstrøm	183 cm (6 ft 0 in)	94 kg (207 lb)	29 January 1988	Oslo	(Sweden) Örebro HK (SHL)
30	G	Lars Haugen	183 cm (6 ft 0 in)	83 kg (183 lb)	19 March 1987	Oslo	(Belarus) HC Dinamo Minsk (KHL)
34	G	Lars Volden	191 cm (6 ft 3 in)	91 kg (201 lb)	26 July 1992	Oslo	(Finland) Espoo Blues (FIN)
36	F	Mats Zuccarello-Aasen	171 cm (5 ft 7 in)	73 kg (161 lb)	1 September 1987	Oslo	(United States) New York Rangers (NHL)
39	D	Henrik Solberg	191 cm (6 ft 3 in)	100 kg (220 lb)	15 April 1987	Trondheim	(Norway) Stavanger Oilers (NOR)
40	F	Ken André Olimb	178 cm (5 ft 10 in)	80 kg (180 lb)	21 January 1989	Oslo	(Germany) Düsseldorfer EG (DEL)
41	F	Patrick Thoresen – A	182 cm (6 ft 0 in)	91 kg (201 lb)	7 November 1983	Hamar	(Russia) SKA Saint Petersburg (KHL)
42	D	Henrik Ødegaard	179 cm (5 ft 10 in)	85 kg (187 lb)	12 February 1988	Asker	(United States) Missouri Mavericks (CHL)
43	F	Fredrik Lystad Jacobsen	180 cm (5 ft 11 in)	86 kg (190 lb)	15 February 1990	Asker	(Norway) Storhamar Dragons (NOR)
46	F	Mathis Olimb	179 cm (5 ft 10 in)	83 kg (183 lb)	1 February 1986	Oslo	(Sweden) Frölunda HC (SHL)
47	D	Alexander Bonsaksen	180 cm (5 ft 11 in)	83 kg (183 lb)	24 January 1987	Oslo	(Norway) Vålerenga Ishockey (NOR)
51	F	Mats Rosseli Olsen	180 cm (5 ft 11 in)	83 kg (183 lb)	29 April 1991	Oslo	(Sweden) Frölunda HC (SHL)
55	D	Ole-Kristian Tollefsen – C	188 cm (6 ft 2 in)	95 kg (209 lb)	6 June 1984	Oslo	(Sweden) Färjestad BK (SHL)
70	G	Steffen Søberg	180 cm (5 ft 11 in)	80 kg (180 lb)	6 August 1993	Oslo	(Norway) Vålerenga Ishockey (NOR)

== Group C ==
=== Czech Republic ===
The following is the Czech roster in the men's ice hockey tournament of the 2014 Winter Olympics.

No.	Pos.	Name	Height	Weight	Birthdate	Birthplace	2013–14 team
1	G	Jakub Kovář	184 cm (6 ft 0 in)	91 kg (201 lb)	19 July 1988	Písek	(Russia) Avtomobilist Yekaterinburg (KHL)
2	D	Marek Židlický	180 cm (5 ft 11 in)	85 kg (187 lb)	3 February 1977	Most	(United States) New Jersey Devils (NHL)
3	D	Radko Gudas	183 cm (6 ft 0 in)	92 kg (203 lb)	5 June 1990	Kladno	(United States) Tampa Bay Lightning (NHL)
5	D	Ladislav Šmíd	191 cm (6 ft 3 in)	102 kg (225 lb)	1 February 1986	Frýdlant	(Canada) Calgary Flames (NHL)
7	D	Tomáš Kaberle	185 cm (6 ft 1 in)	97 kg (214 lb)	2 March 1978	Rakovník	(Czech Republic) Kladno (CZE)
8	D	Michal Barinka	192 cm (6 ft 4 in)	102 kg (225 lb)	12 June 1984	Vyškov	(Czech Republic) Vítkovice (CZE)
9	F	Milan Michálek	188 cm (6 ft 2 in)	103 kg (227 lb)	7 December 1984	Jindřichův Hradec	(Canada) Ottawa Senators (NHL)
10	F	Roman Červenka	181 cm (5 ft 11 in)	91 kg (201 lb)	10 December 1985	Prague	(Russia) SKA Saint Petersburg (KHL)
11	F	Martin Hanzal	196 cm (6 ft 5 in)	99 kg (218 lb)	20 February 1987	České Budějovice	(United States) Phoenix Coyotes (NHL)
12	F	Jiří Novotný	188 cm (6 ft 2 in)	94 kg (207 lb)	12 August 1983	Pelhřimov	(Russia) Lokomotiv Yaroslavl (KHL)
14	F	Tomáš Plekanec – C	180 cm (5 ft 11 in)	89 kg (196 lb)	31 October 1982	Kladno	(Canada) Montreal Canadiens (NHL)
18	F	Ondřej Palát	181 cm (5 ft 11 in)	79 kg (174 lb)	28 March 1991	Frýdek-Místek	(United States) Tampa Bay Lightning (NHL)
23	D	Zbyněk Michálek	189 cm (6 ft 2 in)	95 kg (209 lb)	23 December 1982	Jindřichův Hradec	(United States) Phoenix Coyotes (NHL)
25	D	Lukáš Krajíček	189 cm (6 ft 2 in)	93 kg (205 lb)	11 March 1983	Prostějov	(Belarus) Dinamo Minsk (KHL)
26	F	Patrik Eliáš – A	185 cm (6 ft 1 in)	88 kg (194 lb)	13 April 1976	Třebíč	(United States) New Jersey Devils (NHL)
31	G	Ondřej Pavelec	189 cm (6 ft 2 in)	100 kg (220 lb)	31 August 1987	Kladno	(Canada) Winnipeg Jets (NHL)
32	D	Michal Rozsíval	185 cm (6 ft 1 in)	87 kg (192 lb)	3 September 1978	Vlašim	(United States) Chicago Blackhawks (NHL)
46	F	David Krejčí	183 cm (6 ft 0 in)	80 kg (180 lb)	28 April 1986	Šternberk	(United States) Boston Bruins (NHL)
53	G	Alexander Salák	186 cm (6 ft 1 in)	86 kg (190 lb)	5 January 1987	Strakonice	(Russia) SKA Saint Petersburg (KHL)
67	F	Michael Frolík	185 cm (6 ft 1 in)	89 kg (196 lb)	17 February 1988	Kladno	(Canada) Winnipeg Jets (NHL)
68	F	Jaromír Jágr – A	189 cm (6 ft 2 in)	104 kg (229 lb)	15 February 1972	Kladno	(United States) New Jersey Devils (NHL)
83	F	Aleš Hemský	183 cm (6 ft 0 in)	84 kg (185 lb)	13 August 1983	Pardubice	(Canada) Edmonton Oilers (NHL)
89	F	Jakub Voráček	189 cm (6 ft 2 in)	96 kg (212 lb)	15 August 1989	Kladno	(United States) Philadelphia Flyers (NHL)
91	F	Martin Erat	183 cm (6 ft 0 in)	91 kg (201 lb)	28 August 1981	Třebíč	(United States) Washington Capitals (NHL)
93	F	Petr Nedvěd	192 cm (6 ft 4 in)	93 kg (205 lb)	9 December 1971	Liberec	(Czech Republic) Bílí Tygři Liberec (CZE)

Forward Vladimír Sobotka was also selected but was unable to participate due to injury. He was replaced by Martin Erat.

=== Latvia ===
The following is the Latvian roster in the men's ice hockey tournament of the 2014 Winter Olympics.

No.	Pos.	Name	Height	Weight	Birthdate	Birthplace	2013–14 team
1	G	Ervīns Muštukovs	184 cm (6 ft 0 in)	85 kg (187 lb)	7 April 1984	Rīga	(Denmark) EfB Ishockey (DEN)
3	F	Juris Štāls	191 cm (6 ft 3 in)	94 kg (207 lb)	8 April 1982	Rīga	(Slovakia) HK Poprad (SVK)
5	F	Jānis Sprukts	190 cm (6 ft 3 in)	102 kg (225 lb)	31 January 1982	Rīga	(Russia) Lokomotiv Yaroslavl (KHL)
6	D	Arvīds Reķis	180 cm (5 ft 11 in)	90 kg (200 lb)	1 January 1979	Jūrmala	(Latvia) Dinamo Riga (KHL)
8	D	Sandis Ozoliņš – C	190 cm (6 ft 3 in)	97 kg (214 lb)	3 August 1972	Sigulda	(Latvia) Dinamo Riga (KHL)
9	D	Krišjānis Rēdlihs	189 cm (6 ft 2 in)	93 kg (205 lb)	15 January 1981	Rīga	(Latvia) Dinamo Riga (KHL)
10	F	Lauris Dārziņš – A	191 cm (6 ft 3 in)	91 kg (201 lb)	28 January 1985	Rīga	(Latvia) Dinamo Riga (KHL)
11	D	Kristaps Sotnieks	184 cm (6 ft 0 in)	87 kg (192 lb)	29 January 1987	Rīga	(Latvia) Dinamo Riga (KHL)
12	F	Herberts Vasiļjevs	180 cm (5 ft 11 in)	84 kg (185 lb)	23 May 1976	Rīga	(Germany) Krefeld Pinguine (DEL)
15	F	Mārtiņš Karsums	177 cm (5 ft 10 in)	88 kg (194 lb)	26 February 1986	Rīga	(Russia) Dynamo Moscow (KHL)
16	F	Kaspars Daugaviņš	185 cm (6 ft 1 in)	93 kg (205 lb)	18 May 1988	Rīga	(Switzerland) HC Geneve-Servette (NLA)
21	F	Armands Bērziņš	192 cm (6 ft 4 in)	97 kg (214 lb)	27 December 1983	Rīga	(Kazakhstan) Beibarys Atyrau (KAZ)
24	F	Miķelis Rēdlihs	181 cm (5 ft 11 in)	81 kg (179 lb)	1 July 1984	Rīga	(Russia) Lokomotiv Yaroslavl (KHL)
28	F	Zemgus Girgensons	188 cm (6 ft 2 in)	88 kg (194 lb)	5 January 1994	Rīga	(United States) Buffalo Sabres (NHL)
29	D	Ralfs Freibergs	180 cm (5 ft 11 in)	87 kg (192 lb)	17 May 1991	Rīga	(United States) Bowling Green Falcons (NCAA)
31	G	Edgars Masaļskis	179 cm (5 ft 10 in)	85 kg (187 lb)	31 March 1980	Rīga	(Slovakia) HK Poprad (SVK)
32	D	Artūrs Kulda	188 cm (6 ft 2 in)	98 kg (216 lb)	25 July 1988	Leipzig, Germany	(Russia) Salavat Yulaev Ufa (KHL)
37	D	Oskars Bārtulis – A	190 cm (6 ft 3 in)	92 kg (203 lb)	21 January 1987	Ogre	(Ukraine) Donbass Donetsk (KHL)
47	F	Mārtiņš Cipulis	181 cm (5 ft 11 in)	85 kg (187 lb)	29 November 1980	Cēsis	(Latvia) Dinamo Riga (KHL)
50	G	Kristers Gudļevskis	193 cm (6 ft 4 in)	86 kg (190 lb)	31 July 1992	Aizkraukle	(United States) Syracuse Crunch (AHL)
51	F	Koba Jass	183 cm (6 ft 0 in)	87 kg (192 lb)	4 May 1990	Rīga	(Czech Republic) Bílí Tygři Liberec (CZE)
70	F	Miks Indrašis	190 cm (6 ft 3 in)	85 kg (187 lb)	30 September 1990	Rīga	(Latvia) Dinamo Riga (KHL)
79	F	Vitālijs Pavlovs	195 cm (6 ft 5 in)	98 kg (216 lb)	17 June 1989	Rīga	(Latvia) Dinamo Riga (KHL)
81	D	Georgijs Pujacs	184 cm (6 ft 0 in)	98 kg (216 lb)	11 June 1981	Rīga	(Latvia) Dinamo Riga (KHL)
91	F	Ronalds Ķēniņš	182 cm (6 ft 0 in)	91 kg (201 lb)	28 February 1991	Rīga	(Switzerland) ZSC Lions (NLA)

=== Switzerland ===
The following is the Swiss roster in the men's ice hockey tournament of the 2014 Winter Olympics.

No.	Pos.	Name	Height	Weight	Birthdate	Birthplace	2013–14 team
1	G	Jonas Hiller	188 cm (6 ft 2 in)	86 kg (190 lb)	12 February 1982	Felben-Wellhausen	(United States) Anaheim Ducks (NHL)
3	D	Julien Vauclair	183 cm (6 ft 0 in)	90 kg (200 lb)	2 October 1979	Delémont	(Switzerland) HC Lugano (NLA)
5	D	Severin Blindenbacher	180 cm (5 ft 11 in)	86 kg (190 lb)	15 March 1983	Zürich	(Switzerland) ZSC Lions (NLA)
6	D	Yannick Weber	180 cm (5 ft 11 in)	91 kg (201 lb)	23 September 1988	Morges	(Canada) Vancouver Canucks (NHL)
7	D	Mark Streit – A	183 cm (6 ft 0 in)	93 kg (205 lb)	11 December 1977	Englisberg	(United States) Philadelphia Flyers (NHL)
10	F	Andres Ambühl	178 cm (5 ft 10 in)	86 kg (190 lb)	14 September 1983	Davos	(Switzerland) ZSC Lions (NLA)
12	F	Luca Cunti	188 cm (6 ft 2 in)	95 kg (209 lb)	4 July 1989	Zürich	(Switzerland) ZSC Lions (NLA)
14	F	Roman Wick	188 cm (6 ft 2 in)	94 kg (207 lb)	30 December 1985	Zuzwil	(Switzerland) ZSC Lions (NLA)
16	D	Raphael Diaz	180 cm (5 ft 11 in)	90 kg (200 lb)	9 January 1986	Baar	(Canada) Vancouver Canucks (NHL)
20	G	Reto Berra	196 cm (6 ft 5 in)	91 kg (201 lb)	3 January 1987	Bülach	(Canada) Calgary Flames (NHL)
22	F	Nino Niederreiter	188 cm (6 ft 2 in)	93 kg (205 lb)	8 September 1992	Chur	(United States) Minnesota Wild (NHL)
23	F	Simon Bodenmann	178 cm (5 ft 10 in)	85 kg (187 lb)	2 March 1988	Urnäsch	(Switzerland) Kloten Flyers (NLA)
24	F	Reto Suri	183 cm (6 ft 0 in)	84 kg (185 lb)	25 March 1989	Zürich	(Switzerland) EV Zug (NLA)
28	F	Martin Plüss – A	175 cm (5 ft 9 in)	80 kg (180 lb)	5 April 1977	Bülach	(Switzerland) SC Bern (NLA)
31	D	Mathias Seger – C	180 cm (5 ft 11 in)	84 kg (185 lb)	17 December 1977	Flawil	(Switzerland) ZSC Lions (NLA)
43	F	Morris Trachsler	183 cm (6 ft 0 in)	90 kg (200 lb)	15 July 1984	Zürich	(Switzerland) ZSC Lions (NLA)
48	F	Matthias Bieber	180 cm (5 ft 11 in)	85 kg (187 lb)	14 March 1986	Zürich	(Switzerland) Kloten Flyers (NLA)
51	F	Ryan Gardner	201 cm (6 ft 7 in)	100 kg (220 lb)	18 April 1978	Toronto, Canada	(Switzerland) SC Bern (NLA)
52	G	Tobias Stephan	196 cm (6 ft 5 in)	82 kg (181 lb)	7 April 1984	Zürich	(Switzerland) Genève-Servette HC (NLA)
70	F	Denis Hollenstein	183 cm (6 ft 0 in)	88 kg (194 lb)	15 October 1989	Zürich	(Switzerland) Genève-Servette HC (NLA)
72	D	Patrick von Gunten	180 cm (5 ft 11 in)	83 kg (183 lb)	10 February 1985	Biel/Bienne	(Switzerland) Kloten Flyers (NLA)
82	F	Simon Moser	188 cm (6 ft 2 in)	95 kg (209 lb)	10 March 1989	Bern	(United States) Nashville Predators (NHL)
88	F	Kevin Romy	180 cm (5 ft 11 in)	83 kg (183 lb)	31 January 1985	La Chaux-de-Fonds	(Switzerland) Genève-Servette HC (NLA)
90	D	Roman Josi	185 cm (6 ft 1 in)	90 kg (200 lb)	1 June 1990	Bern	(United States) Nashville Predators (NHL)
96	F	Damien Brunner	180 cm (5 ft 11 in)	83 kg (183 lb)	9 March 1986	Kloten	(United States) New Jersey Devils (NHL)

=== Sweden ===
The following is the Swedish roster in the men's ice hockey tournament of the 2014 Winter Olympics.

No.	Pos.	Name	Height	Weight	Birthdate	Birthplace	2013–14 team
1	G	Jhonas Enroth	180 cm (5 ft 11 in)	75 kg (165 lb)	25 June 1988	Stockholm	(United States) Buffalo Sabres (NHL)
3	D	Oliver Ekman-Larsson	188 cm (6 ft 2 in)	86 kg (190 lb)	17 July 1991	Karlskrona	(United States) Phoenix Coyotes (NHL)
4	D	Niklas Hjalmarsson	191 cm (6 ft 3 in)	94 kg (207 lb)	6 June 1987	Eksjö	(United States) Chicago Blackhawks (NHL)
7	D	Henrik Tallinder	193 cm (6 ft 4 in)	98 kg (216 lb)	10 January 1979	Stockholm	(United States) Buffalo Sabres (NHL)
11	F	Daniel Alfredsson – A	182 cm (6 ft 0 in)	92 kg (203 lb)	11 December 1972	Gothenburg	(United States) Detroit Red Wings (NHL)
14	F	Patrik Berglund	192 cm (6 ft 4 in)	99 kg (218 lb)	2 June 1988	Västerås	(United States) St. Louis Blues (NHL)
16	F	Marcus Krüger	182 cm (6 ft 0 in)	82 kg (181 lb)	27 May 1990	Stockholm	(United States) Chicago Blackhawks (NHL)
18	F	Jakob Silfverberg	186 cm (6 ft 1 in)	91 kg (201 lb)	13 October 1990	Gävle	(United States) Anaheim Ducks (NHL)
19	F	Nicklas Bäckström	185 cm (6 ft 1 in)	95 kg (209 lb)	23 November 1987	Valbo	(United States) Washington Capitals (NHL)
20	F	Alexander Steen	182 cm (6 ft 0 in)	95 kg (209 lb)	1 March 1984	Winnipeg	(United States) St. Louis Blues (NHL)
21	F	Loui Eriksson	188 cm (6 ft 2 in)	89 kg (196 lb)	17 July 1985	Gothenburg	(United States) Boston Bruins (NHL)
22	F	Daniel Sedin	185 cm (6 ft 1 in)	85 kg (187 lb)	26 September 1980	Örnsköldsvik	(Canada) Vancouver Canucks (NHL)
23	D	Alexander Edler	191 cm (6 ft 3 in)	98 kg (216 lb)	21 April 1986	Östersund	(Canada) Vancouver Canucks (NHL)
27	D	Johnny Oduya	183 cm (6 ft 0 in)	86 kg (190 lb)	1 October 1981	Stockholm	(United States) Chicago Blackhawks (NHL)
30	G	Henrik Lundqvist	185 cm (6 ft 1 in)	87 kg (192 lb)	2 March 1982	Åre	(United States) New York Rangers (NHL)
40	F	Henrik Zetterberg	183 cm (6 ft 0 in)	86 kg (190 lb)	9 October 1980	Njurunda	(United States) Detroit Red Wings (NHL)
41	F	Gustav Nyquist	180 cm (5 ft 11 in)	89 kg (196 lb)	1 September 1989	Halmstad	(United States) Detroit Red Wings (NHL)
42	F	Jimmie Ericsson	187 cm (6 ft 2 in)	84 kg (185 lb)	22 February 1980	Skellefteå	(Sweden) Skellefteå AIK (SHL)
50	G	Jonas Gustavsson	191 cm (6 ft 3 in)	87 kg (192 lb)	24 October 1984	Danderyd	(United States) Detroit Red Wings (NHL)
52	D	Jonathan Ericsson	195 cm (6 ft 5 in)	102 kg (225 lb)	2 March 1984	Karlskrona	(United States) Detroit Red Wings (NHL)
55	D	Niklas Kronwall – C	183 cm (6 ft 0 in)	87 kg (192 lb)	12 January 1981	Stockholm	(United States) Detroit Red Wings (NHL)
62	F	Carl Hagelin	182 cm (6 ft 0 in)	85 kg (187 lb)	23 August 1988	Södertälje	(United States) New York Rangers (NHL)
65	D	Erik Karlsson	181 cm (5 ft 11 in)	79 kg (174 lb)	31 May 1990	Landsbro	(Canada) Ottawa Senators (NHL)
90	F	Marcus Johansson	183 cm (6 ft 0 in)	93 kg (205 lb)	6 October 1990	Landskrona	(United States) Washington Capitals (NHL)
92	F	Gabriel Landeskog – A	185 cm (6 ft 1 in)	99 kg (218 lb)	23 November 1992	Stockholm	(United States) Colorado Avalanche (NHL)

Forwards Johan Franzén and Henrik Sedin were also selected but were unable to participate due to injury. They were replaced by Gustav Nyquist and Marcus Johansson respectively. Henrik Zetterberg was originally named team captain but was replaced by Niklas Kronwall when Zetterberg left the Games due to injury.

== See also ==
- Ice hockey at the 2014 Winter Olympics – Women's team rosters
