= Anna Vinogradova =

Russian ice hockey player

- Born: 6 April 1991 (age 33); Chelyabinsk, Russian SSR, Soviet Union
- Height: 5 ft 6 in (168 cm)
- Weight: 152 lb (69 kg; 10 st 12 lb)
- Position: Goaltender
- Catches: Left
- National team: Russia
- Playing career: 2008–present

Anna Konstantinovna Vinogradova (Russian: Анна Константиновна Виноградова) (born 6 April 1991) is a Russian ice hockey goaltender.

== International career ==
Vinogradova was selected for the Russia women's national ice hockey team in the 2014 Winter Olympics. She did not dress for any of the games.

Vinogradova made one appearance for the Russia women's national under-18 ice hockey team, at the IIHF World Women's U18 Championships, in 2008.

== Career statistics ==
=== International career ===
Through 2013–14 season

Year	Team	Event	GP	W	L	MIN	GA	SO	GAA	SV%
2008	Russia U18	U18	5	0	5	213	21	0	5.92	.846
