= Women's ice hockey in Finland =

- Country: Finland
- Governing body: Finnish Ice Hockey Association
- National teams: National team National U18 team
- Registered players: 5,763

National competitions
- Auroraliiga; Naisten Mestis; Naisten Suomi-sarja

International competitions
- Olympic Games; World Championship; U18 World Championship; European Championship

The national program for women's ice hockey in Finland had 5,858 active players in 2019. The Finnish Ice Hockey Association organizes both the national women's program and the three levels of domestic women's leagues in Finland.

== History ==
The first women's hockey teams were founded in Finland in the early 1970s but it took many years for women's ice hockey to gain enough popularity and participation to warrant the creation of a national league. In 1978, the first "lipstick tournament" was held, creating an informal national women's championship, though records of the competition outcomes are not available.

In 1982 the Naisten SM-sarja was founded as the first elite women's national league in Finland. The first season was played in two divisions of five teams each (10 teams total) and the first playoffs were held in Tampere on March 12 and 13, 1983. Since its founding, the number of teams per season has ranged from 8 to 13. In 2017, the Naisten SM-sarja was renamed Naisten Liiga and in 2018 the number of teams was expanded to the league's original number of 10.

The Finland women's national team entered international competition in the 1988–1989 season, quickly claiming its first gold at the 1989 IIHF European Women Championships. The team has remained successful since its emergence on the international stage, medalling in three Olympics and 13 Women's World Championships. Most recently, Finland took silver at the 2019 Women's World Championship after a controversial loss in the finals to the United States.

== Developmental leagues ==
The number of young women in the junior level increased slowly, from 500 players at the beginning to approximately 2000 today. The growth rate was not satisfactory, so the Finnish Ice Hockey Association decided to invest in development of women's ice hockey by supporting leagues. The number of teams considerably increased: there are now 12 teams in the Women's 1st Division, is Naisten Mestis (second level after the Naisten Liiga).

=== Lohko 1 ===
Team	City
HPK	Hämeenlinna
Ilves	Tampere
Reipas	Lahti
Marski-Hockey	Mikkeli
SaiPa	Lappeenranta
Ässät	Pori

=== Lohko 2 ===
Team	City
EPS Espoo	Espoo
HG-92	Tuusula
Karhu-Kissat	Vantaa
PaKa	Kuusamo
Sport	Vaasa
Tappara	Tampere

== Tournaments ==
The following IIHF tournaments were hosted in Finland.

Event	Location	Finish
1992 IIHF Women's World Championship	Tampere	(bronze) Bronze
1998 3 Nations Cup	Kuortane	(bronze) Bronze
1999 IIHF Women's World Championship	Espoo	(bronze) Bronze
2001 3 Nations Cup	Vierumäki and Tampere	(silver) Silver
2005 4 Nations Cup	Hämeenlinna	(bronze) Bronze
2008–09 IIHF European Women's Champions Cup	Lohja	(bronze) Bronze (Espoo Blues)
2009 IIHF Women's World Championship	Hämeenlinna	(bronze) Bronze
2009 4 Nations Cup	Vierumäki	Fourth
2011–12 IIHF European Women's Champions Cup	Hämeenlinna	(bronze) Bronze (HPK)
2012 4 Nations Cup	Tikkurila	Fourth
2012–13 IIHF European Women's Champions Cup	Oulu	(bronze) Bronze (Oulun Kärpät)
2014–15 IIHF European Women's Champions Cup	Espoo	(bronze) Bronze (Espoo Blues)
2016 4 Nations Cup	Vierumäki	(bronze) Bronze

== Leading scorers ==
=== IIHF Worlds ===
- Riikka Sallinen (née Nieminen, previously Välilä) is Finland's all-time leader with 41 points (23 goals, 18 assists). She participated in four IIHF Worlds. She led two World Championships (1994 and 1997) in scoring. Her 41 points ranks seventh all-time in World Championship scoring. She appeared in 118 games for Finland, scoring 109 goals, 95 assists and 204 points.
- Tiia Reima ranks second all-time with 34 points (14 goals, 20 assists) and participated in six tournaments. Her 20 assists is the Finnish career mark for most assists in World Championship play. She earned five bronze medals at the '90, '92, '94, '97 and '99 World Championships.

=== Olympics ===
- Riikka Sallinen ranks as the all time leading Olympic scorer for Finland. She was the top point producer at the 1998 Olympic Winter Games.

== Famous firsts ==
- 1983: Official start of a women's elite league in Finland
- 1989: Naisleijonat won the first Women's European Championships
- 1990: Finland claimed the bronze in the first IIHF Women's World Championships
- May 21, 2010: Riikka Sallinen was inducted into the IIHF Hall of Fame in Cologne, Germany. She was only the fourth woman to receive this honor and the first from Finland.

== Finnish women in NCAA ==
Position	Name	NCAA school	Seasons
G	Noora Räty	Minnesota	2009–2013
D	Mariia Posa	Minnesota Duluth	2009–2012
F	Nina Tikkinen	Minnesota State	2007–2010
F	Minttu Tuominen	Ohio State	2009–2013
F	Saara Niemi	Minnesota Duluth	2008–2010

== See also ==
- Finland women's national ice hockey team
- Finland women's national under-18 ice hockey team
- Naisten Liiga
