= Isabel Waidacher =

Swiss ice hockey player

- Born: 25 July 1994 (age 32) Arosa, Switzerland
- Height: 1.62 m (5 ft 4 in)
- Weight: 55 kg (121 lb; 8 st 9 lb)
- Position: Forward
- Shoots: Right
- SWHL team Former teams: Djurgårdens IF Hockey; EHC Chur; ZSC Lions; College of St. Scholastica
- National team: Switzerland
- Playing career: 2007–present

Isabel Waidacher (born 25 July 1994) is a Swiss ice hockey player for Djurgårdens IF Hockey and the Swiss national team.

== Playing career ==
She participated at the 2017 IIHF Women's World Championship.

== Personal life ==
Her sisters Monika Waidacher and Nina Waidacher are also hockey players.
