= Neuchâtel Hockey Academy =

Swiss ice hockey club

- City: Neuchâtel, Switzerland
- League: Women's League
- Founded: 1999
- Home arena: Patinoire du Littoral
- Colours: Blue, grey, white
- General manager: Laure Aeschimann
- Head coach: Yan Gigon
- Captain: Inès Berset
- Website: Official website

The Neuchâtel Hockey Academy, abbreviated NHA, NE Hockey Academy, or Neuchâtel HA, is a women's ice hockey club in Neuchâtel, Switzerland. The club's representative team has played in the Women's League (SWHL A), the top flight of women's ice hockey in Switzerland, since 2011. They are the only Romand club with a team in the Women's League. The other Neuchâtel Hockey Academy teams play in the SWHL C and SWHL D.

== History ==
The club was created in 1999 by Céline Guerne and began competing in the Leistungsklasse C (now SWHL C). In 2007, they earned promotion to the Leistungsklasse B (now SWHL B), and in 2011 to the Leistungsklasse A (now Women's League, previously SWHL A).

In 2016, the team name was changed from HC Université Neuchâtel to Neuchâtel Hockey Academy.

In 2020, the club made the Swiss Championship finals for the first time. The finals were ultimately cancelled due to the COVID-19 pandemic.
