= Nina Kindschi =

Swiss ice hockey player

- Born: 23 August 1992 (age 34) Arosa, Switzerland
- Height: 5 ft 7 in (170 cm)
- Weight: 143 lb (65 kg; 10 st 3 lb)
- Position: Forward
- Shot: Right
- Played for: ZSC Lions Frauen
- National team: Switzerland
- Playing career: 2012–2021
Medal record
Women's ice hockey
Representing Switzerland
Olympic Games
Bronze medal – third place	2014 Sochi	Team
World Championships
Bronze medal – third place	2012 United States

Nina Kindschi (née Waidacher; born 23 August 1992) is a Swiss ice hockey forward who plays internationally for the Switzerland women's national ice hockey team. She has represented Switzerland at the Winter Olympics in 2014 and won the bronze medal after defeating Sweden in the bronze medal playoff. She attended The College of St. Scholastica.

== Personal life ==
Her sisters Isabel Waidacher and Monika Waidacher are also hockey players.

She is married to Simon Kindschi.
