= 2021 Channel One Cup =

Tournament details
- Host countries: Russia; Czechia
- Cities: Moscow; Prague
- Venues: 2 (in 2 host cities)
- Dates: 15–19 December 2021
- Teams: 5

Final positions
- Champions: Finland (3rd title)
- Runners-up: Russia
- Third place: Canada
- Fourth place: Sweden

Tournament statistics
- Games played: 8
- Goals scored: 39 (4.88 per game)
- Attendance: 43,946 (5,493 per game)
- Scoring leader: (Czech Republic) Milan Gulas (5 points)

The 2021 Channel One Cup was played between 15 and 19 December 2021. Canada, Czech Republic, Finland, Sweden and Russia played in the tournament. Seven of the matches were played in the CSKA Arena in Moscow, Russia, and one match in the O2 Arena in Prague, Czech Republic. The tournament was part of 2021–22 Euro Hockey Tour, and the last before being ejected from the Tour in response to the Russian invasion of Ukraine in February 2022. It was won by Finland, the third time in tournament history, with a 3–2 overtime win over Russia.

In the game against Finland, Russia played with replica Soviet jerseys. This act was criticized by former Finnish Prime Minister Alexander Stubb, who referred to the Soviet Union being a totalitarian state.

Due to technical reasons, it was not possible to play all ten matches, but only eight. As a result, not all teams played the same number of matches. The overall tournament ranking was therefore not determined by the total number of points scored, but by the percentage of total possible points.

== Standings ==
Pos	Team	Pld	W	OTW	OTL	L	GF	GA	GD	Pts
1	Finland	3	1	2	0	0	10	5	+5	7
2	Russia	4	3	0	1	0	12	8	+4	10
3	Canada	3	1	0	0	2	7	9	−2	3
4	Sweden	3	1	0	0	2	4	6	−2	3
5	Czech Republic	3	0	0	1	2	6	11	−5	1

Source: HockeyCanada

== Games ==
15 December 2021; 18:30	Canada	3-4 (0–1, 1-2, 2-1)	Russia	CSKA Arena, Moscow; Attendance: 8,568

Game reference

Justin Pogge
Goalies
Ivan Fedotov
Referees:
(Russia) Roman Gofman
(Russia) Yevgeny Romasko

	0-1	04:24 – Korshkov
Gormley (Robinson, Tambellini) – 27:51 (PP)	1-1
	1-2	28:16 – Yelesin (Marchenko, Chibisov)
	1-3	39:54 – Nesterov (Anisimov) (PP)
	1-4	40:20 – Shipachyov (Marchenko)
Audette (Knight) – 47:10	2-4
O’Dell (Robinson, Spooner) – 58:38	3-4

8 min
Penalties
2 min
31
Shots
35

16 December 2021; 18:30	Russia	1-0 (0-0, 0-0, 1-0)	Sweden	CSKA Arena, Moscow; Attendance: 6,726

Game reference
Magnus Hellberg	Goalies	Ivan Fedotov	Referees: (Russia) Maxim Sidorenko (Russia) Roman Gofman
Voynov (Gusev, Tkachyov) – 47:55 / 1-0			Referees: (Russia) Maxim Sidorenko (Russia) Roman Gofman
4 min	Penalties	2 min	Referees: (Russia) Maxim Sidorenko (Russia) Roman Gofman
34	Shots	26	Referees: (Russia) Maxim Sidorenko (Russia) Roman Gofman

16 December 2021; 20:00	Finland	3-2 GWS (1-0, 0-1, 1-1) (OT: 0–0) (SO: 1–0)	Czech Republic	O2 Arena, Prague; Attendance: 1,000

Game reference

Šimon Hrubec
Goalies
Harri Säteri
Referees:
(Czech Republic) Antonín Jeřábek
(Czech Republic) Jakub Šindel

	0-1	32:41 – Kovář (Gulas)
Manninen (Granlund, Pokka) – 09:27	1-1
	1-2	59:49 – Gulas (Kovář)
Levtchi (Kemppainen, Karjalainen) – 47:52	2-2

Tiivola
Shootout

4 min
Penalties
8 min
37
Shots
24

17 December 2021; 15:00	Sweden	1-3 (0-1, 1-2, 0-0)	Canada	CSKA Arena, Moscow

Game reference

Adam Reideborn
Goalies
Edward Pasquale
Referees:
(Russia) Yevgeny Romasko
(Czech Republic) Martin Frano

Rydahl (Pettersson, Almquist) – 35:47	1-0
	1-1	19:06 – Gormley (Tambellini, Robinson)
	1-2	37:18 – O’Dell (Graovac, Ellis)
	1-3	38:33 – Genoway (Currie, Knight)

10 min
Penalties
12 min
27
Shots
25

18 December 2021; 11:00	Canada	1-4 (0-2, 1-0, 0-2)	Finland	CSKA Arena, Moscow; Attendance: 5,682

Game reference

Justin Pogge
Goalies
Christian Heljanko
Referees:
(Czech Republic) Martin Frano
(Russia) Roman Gofman

	0-1	00:32 – Karjalainen (Kemiläinen, Levtchi)
	0-2	04:35 – Karjalainen (Kemiläinen, Ojamäki)
]Ferraro (Genoway) – 29:18	1-2
	1-3	48:19 – Markus GranlundGranlund
	1-4	57:40 – Nenonen (PP)

6 min
Penalties
2 min
22
Shots
21

18 December 2021; 15:30	Russia	5-2 (3-1, 2-0, 0-1)	Czech Republic	CSKA Arena, Moscow; Attendance: 8,445

Game reference

Alexander Samonov Timur Bilyalov
Goalies
Roman Will Šimon Hrubec
Referees:
(Russia) Yevgeny Romasko
(Russia) Maxim Sidorenko

Arseny Gritsyuk – 00:14	1-0
Vovchenko (Korshkov, Anisimov) – 07:31	2-0
Grigorenko (Gusev, Shipachyov) – 14:08	3-0
	3-1	18:18 – Kovář (Frolik, Klok)
Grigorenko (Gusev, Shipachyov) – 37:27	4-1
Anisimov (Yelesin, Marchenko) (PP) – 39:12	5-1
	5-2	47:36 – Gulas (Spacek, Jerabek) (PP)

6 min
Penalties
2 min
22
Shots
29

19 December 2021; 11:00	Czech Republic	2-3 (0-1, 2-0, 0-2)	Sweden	CSKA Arena, Moscow; Attendance: 4,981

Game reference

Šimon Hrubec
Goalies
Magnus Hellberg
Referees:
(Russia) Yevgeny Romasko
(Russia) Roman Gofman

	0-1	05:48 – Rydahl (Larsson)
Gulas (Sobotka, Zamorsky) – 31:09	1-1
Kovář (Gulas, Nestrasil) – 35:08	2-1
	2-2	44:13 – Bengtsson (Olofsson) (PP)
	2-3	54:44 – Heed (Hultström) (PP)

8 min
Penalties
6 min
17
Shots
31

19 December 2021; 15:30	Russia	2-3 OT (0-1, 1-0, 1-1) (OT: 0–1)	Finland	CSKA Arena, Moscow; Attendance: 8,544

Game reference

Ivan Fedotov
Goalies
Harri Säteri
Referees:
(Russia) Martin Frano
(Russia) Maxim Sidorenko

	0-1	18:27 – Merelä (Nättinen, Salomäki)
Minulin (Grigorenko, Gusev) – 35:37	1-1
	1-2	44:04 – Manninen (Hartikainen, Kemppainen) (PP)
Voynov (Tolchinsky, Semyonov) – 56:22	2-2
	2-3	64:30 – Manninen (Kemiläinen) (EN)

2 min
Penalties
4 min
27
Shots
23

== Scoring leaders ==
Pos	Player	Country	GP	G	A	Pts	+/−	PIM	POS
1	Milan Gulas	Czech Republic	3	3	2	5	+3	0	F
2	Jan Kovář	Czech Republic	3	3	1	4	+1	0	F
3	Nikita Gusev	Russia	3	0	4	4	+4	0	F
4	Sakari Manninen	Finland	3	3	0	3	+1	0	F
5	Jere Karjalainen	Finland	3	2	1	3	+3	0	F

GP = Games played; G = Goals; A = Assists; Pts = Points; +/− = Plus/minus; PIM = Penalties in minutes; POS = Position
Source: eurohockey
