= Irma Makhinia =

Russian ski jumper (born 2002)

Personal information
- Born: 6 September 2002 (age 23)

Sport
- Country: Russian
- Sport: Skiing
Medal record
Women's ski jumping
Representing ROC
Olympic Games
Silver medal – second place	2022 Beijing	Mixed team
Representing Russia
Junior World Championships
Silver medal – second place	2021 Lahti	Team NH

Irma Georgiyevna Makhinia (Russian: Ирма Георгиевна Махиня; born 6 September 2002) is a Russian ski jumper. She won a silver medal at the 2022 Winter Olympics in the mixed team event.
