= Egor Yakovlev =

Russian ice hockey player (born 1991)

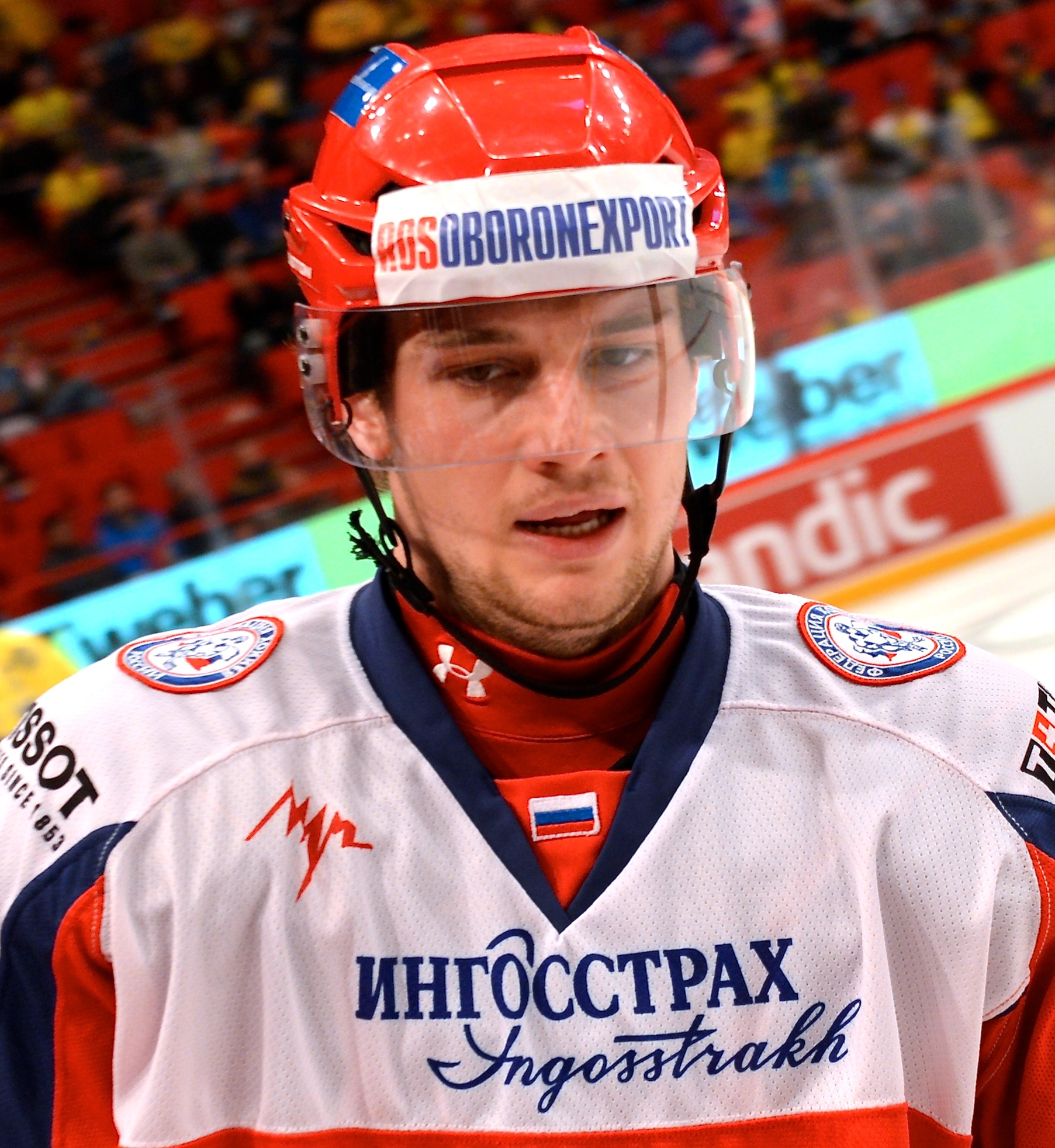
- Yakovlev with Russia in 2014
- Born: 17 September 1991 (age 34) Magnitogorsk, Russian SFSR, Soviet Union
- Height: 6 ft 0 in (183 cm)
- Weight: 192 lb (87 kg; 13 st 10 lb)
- Position: Defence
- Shoots: Left
- KHL team Former teams: Metallurg Magnitogorsk; Ak Bars Kazan; Lokomotiv Yaroslavl; SKA Saint Petersburg; New Jersey Devils
- National team: Russia
- NHL draft: Undrafted
- Playing career: 2010–present

Egor Konstantinovich Yakovlev (Russian: Егор Константинович Яковлев; born 17 September 1991) is a Russian professional ice hockey defenceman for Metallurg Magnitogorsk of the Kontinental Hockey League (KHL). He previously played in the National Hockey League (NHL) with the New Jersey Devils.

Internationally, Yakovlev was part of the Russian team on numerous occasions, winning the 2014 IIHF World Championships, as well as the gold medal at the 2018 Winter Olympics.

== Playing career ==
Yakovlev made his Kontinental Hockey League (KHL) debut playing with Ak Bars Kazan during the 2010–11 KHL season. On 20 October 2011, Yakovlev signed a three-year deal with Lokomotiv Yaroslavl. He was the first player signed by the club after the 2011 Lokomotiv Yaroslavl plane crash that killed the majority of its roster six weeks earlier. On 7 June 2015, he signed a three-year contract with KHL powerhouse SKA Saint Petersburg.

On 21 May 2018, Yakovlev signed a one-year, entry-level contract with the New Jersey Devils of the National Hockey League (NHL). Yakovlev began the 2018–19 season with the Devils American Hockey League affiliate, the Binghamton Devils. He made his NHL debut on 11 November against the Winnipeg Jets and scored his first career NHL goal on 3 December in a 5–1 loss to the Tampa Bay Lightning. Yakovlev split the season between New Jersey and Binghamton, finishing with 2 goals and 7 points in 25 games in the NHL.

As an impending free agent, Yakovlev left the Devils in order to return to continue his career in the KHL, signing a two-year contract with hometown club, Metallurg Magnitogorsk, on 15 May 2019.

== International play ==
Medal record

Ice hockey

Representing Olympic Athletes from Russia

Olympic Games
Gold medal – first place	2018 Pyeongchang	

Representing ROC

Olympic Games
Silver medal – second place	2022 Beijing	

Representing Russia

World Championships
Gold medal – first place	2014 Minsk	
Silver medal – second place	2015 Czech Republic	

On 23 January 2022, Yakovlev was named to the roster to represent Russian Olympic Committee athletes at the 2022 Winter Olympics.

== Career statistics ==
=== Regular season and playoffs ===
			Regular season					Playoffs
Season	Team	League	GP	G	A	Pts	PIM	GP	G	A	Pts	PIM
2008–09	Ak Bars–2 Kazan	RUS.3	62	3	11	14	66	3	0	0	0	2
2009–10	Bars Kazan	MHL	54	4	19	23	72	9	4	0	4	10
2010–11	Bars Kazan	MHL	37	7	25	32	32	—	—	—	—	—
2010–11	Ak Bars Kazan	KHL	1	0	0	0	0	—	—	—	—	—
2010–11	Neftyanik Almetievsk	VHL	8	2	2	4	6	17	1	2	3	16
2011–12	Bars Kazan	MHL	4	1	0	1	0	—	—	—	—	—
2011–12	Neftyanik Almetievsk	VHL	15	2	3	5	8	—	—	—	—	—
2011–12	Lokomotiv Yaroslavl	VHL	21	1	5	6	20	8	4	0	4	6
2011–12	Loko Yaroslavl	MHL	2	0	1	1	0	—	—	—	—	—
2012–13	Lokomotiv Yaroslavl	KHL	49	2	5	7	34	6	0	0	0	0
2012–13	Lokomotiv–2 Yaroslavl	VHL	2	0	1	1	0	—	—	—	—	—
2012–13	Loko Yaroslavl	MHL	2	0	1	1	0	—	—	—	—	—
2013–14	Lokomotiv Yaroslavl	KHL	48	3	3	6	34	18	2	2	4	4
2014–15	Lokomotiv Yaroslavl	KHL	53	7	8	15	20	6	0	1	1	0
2015–16	SKA Saint Petersburg	KHL	59	3	7	10	57	15	0	1	1	20
2016–17	SKA Saint Petersburg	KHL	56	6	15	21	51	15	0	3	3	6
2017–18	SKA Saint Petersburg	KHL	35	5	4	9	14	7	0	1	1	4
2018–19	Binghamton Devils	AHL	19	0	16	16	6	—	—	—	—	—
2018–19	New Jersey Devils	NHL	25	2	5	7	6	—	—	—	—	—
2019–20	Metallurg Magnitogorsk	KHL	60	8	8	16	40	5	0	0	0	0
2020–21	Metallurg Magnitogorsk	KHL	58	8	19	27	26	5	2	1	3	2
2021–22	Metallurg Magnitogorsk	KHL	48	2	14	16	18	24	2	13	15	8
2022–23	Metallurg Magnitogorsk	KHL	68	8	23	31	30	11	2	3	5	2
2023–24	Metallurg Magnitogorsk	KHL	64	6	21	27	19	19	2	2	4	8
2024–25	Metallurg Magnitogorsk	KHL	55	0	7	7	12	3	0	0	0	2
2025–26	Metallurg Magnitogorsk	KHL	59	10	24	34	26	12	1	4	5	4
KHL totals			713	68	158	226	381	146	11	31	42	60
NHL totals			25	2	5	7	6	—	—	—	—	—

=== International ===
Year	Team	Event	Result	GP	G	A	Pts	PIM
2014	Russia	WC	1st place, gold medalist(s)	10	1	2	3	6
2015	Russia	WC	2nd place, silver medalist(s)	10	0	0	0	6
2018	OAR	OG	1st place, gold medalist(s)	5	0	1	1	0
2018	Russia	WC	6th	8	0	1	1	0
2022	ROC	OG	2nd place, silver medalist(s)	6	0	2	2	0
Senior totals				39	1	6	7	12

== Awards and honors ==
Award	Year
KHL
Gagarin Cup (SKA Saint Petersburg)	2017
Gagarin Cup (Metallurg Magnitogorsk)	2024
