= Sergei Telegin =

Russian ice hockey player

- Born: 21 September 2000 (age 25) Chelyabinsk, Russia
- Height: 5 ft 11 in (180 cm)
- Weight: 172 lb (78 kg; 12 st 4 lb)
- Position: Defence
- Shoots: Left
- KHL team: Traktor Chelyabinsk
- National team: Russia
- Playing career: 2019–present

Sergei Telegin (born 21 September 2000) is a Russian professional ice hockey defenseman for Traktor Chelyabinsk of the Kontinental Hockey League (KHL).

== Playing career ==
Telegin made his professional debut for Traktor Chelyabinsk during the 2020–21 season.

== International play ==
Medal record

Ice hockey

Representing ROC

Olympic Games
Silver medal – second place	2022 Beijing	

On 23 January 2022, Telegin was named to the roster to represent Russian Olympic Committee athletes at the 2022 Winter Olympics.

== Career statistics ==
=== Regular season and playoffs ===
			Regular season					Playoffs
Season	Team	League	GP	G	A	Pts	PIM	GP	G	A	Pts	PIM
2016–17	Mamonty Yugry	RUS U17	36	0	11	11	4	—	—	—	—	—
2016–17	Mamonty Yugry	RUS U18	1	0	0	0	0	—	—	—	—	—
2017–18	Mamonty Yugry	RUS U18	36	13	26	39	14	—	—	—	—	—
2018–19	Mamonty Yugry	MHL	51	1	6	7	36	14	1	2	3	4
2019–20	Mamonty Yugry	MHL	7	1	1	2	6	—	—	—	—	—
2019–20	HC Yugra	VHL	41	2	4	6	16	9	1	0	1	2
2020–21	Chelmet Chelyabinsk	VHL	7	0	2	2	2	—	—	—	—	—
2020–21	Traktor Chelyabinsk	KHL	44	3	7	10	16	5	0	0	0	2
2021–22	Traktor Chelyabinsk	KHL	46	2	6	8	12	15	2	2	4	7
2022–23	Traktor Chelyabinsk	KHL	58	5	17	22	26	—	—	—	—	—
2023–24	Traktor Chelyabinsk	KHL	62	6	15	21	21	10	1	1	2	19
2024–25	Traktor Chelyabinsk	KHL	58	4	19	23	12	21	1	2	3	8
2025–26	Traktor Chelyabinsk	KHL	61	2	9	11	63	5	0	1	1	2
KHL totals			329	22	73	95	150	56	4	6	10	38

=== International ===
Year	Team	Event	Result	GP	G	A	Pts	PIM
2022	ROC	OG	2nd place, silver medalist(s)	6	0	0	0	0
Senior totals				6	0	0	0	0
