= Russian Olympic Committee athletes at the 2022 Winter Olympics =

ROC at the 2022 Winter Olympics
- IOC code: ROC
- NOC: Russian Olympic Committee

in Beijing, China 4–20 February 2022
- Competitors: 209 (107 men and 102 women) in 15 sports
- Flag bearers (opening): Olga Fatkulina; Vadim Shipachyov
- Flag bearer (closing): Alexander Bolshunov
- Medals Ranked 9th: Gold 5 Silver 12 Bronze 15 Total 32

Winter Olympics appearances (overview)
- 2022

Other related appearances
- Soviet Union (1956–1988); Unified Team (1992); Russia (1994–2014); Olympic Athletes from Russia (2018); Individual Neutral Athletes (2026)

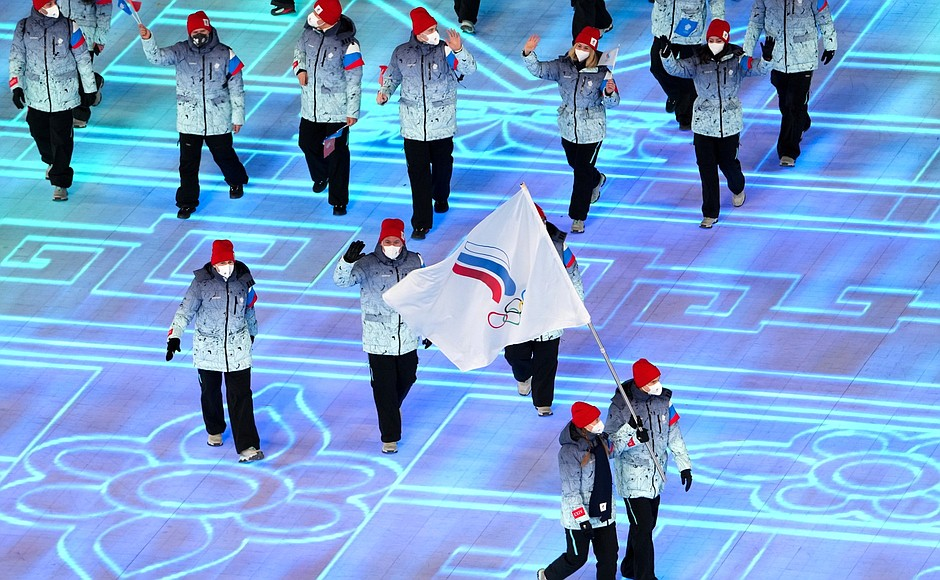
Russian athletes at the Opening ceremony of the XXIV Winter Olympic Games

Russian athletes competed at the 2022 Winter Olympics in Beijing, China, from 4 to 20 February 2022, under the "Russian Olympic Committee" designation (using the acronym "ROC") due to the consequences of the doping scandal in the country.

On 9 December 2019, the World Anti-Doping Agency (WADA) banned Russia from all international sport for four years, after it had been found that data provided by the Russian Anti-Doping Agency had been manipulated by Russian authorities with a goal of protecting athletes involved in its state-sponsored doping scheme. Russia later filed an appeal to the Court of Arbitration for Sport (CAS) against the WADA decision. The Court of Arbitration for Sport, on review of Russia's appeal of its case from WADA, ruled on 17 December 2020 to reduce the penalty that WADA had placed. Instead of banning Russia from sporting events, the ruling allowed Russia to participate at the Olympics and other international events, but for a period of two years, the team cannot use the Russian name, flag, or anthem and must present themselves as "Neutral Athlete" or "Neutral Team". The ruling does allow for team uniforms to display "Russia" on the uniform as well as the use of the Russian flag colors within the uniform's design, although the name should be up to equal predominance as the "Neutral Athlete/Team" designation. Russia could appeal the decision.

On 19 February 2021, it was announced that Russia would compete under the acronym "ROC", after the name of the Russian Olympic Committee. On aftermatch, the IOC announced that the Russian national flag would be substituted by the flag of the Russian Olympic Committee. It would also be allowed to use team uniforms bearing the words "Russian Olympic Committee", or the acronym "ROC" would be added.

On 15 April 2021, the uniforms for the Russian Olympic Committee athletes were unveiled, featuring the colours of the Russian flag. On 22 April 2021, the replacement for Russia's anthem was approved by the IOC, after an earlier choice of the patriotic Russian song "Katyusha" was rejected. A fragment of Pyotr Tchaikovsky's Piano Concerto No. 1 is used.

Triple gold medalist and eight-time medalist Alexander Bolshunov was the closing ceremony flagbearer.

On 19 February, Russian athletes officially set a new record for the total number of medals won, having earned at least 32 and improving on Russia's previous best result in Sochi (30 medals) and USSR's result in Calgary (29 medals). However, in the gold medal count the team finished only ninth with five gold medals. (Note: On 29 January 2024, the Court of Arbitration for Sport (CAS) disqualified Kamila Valieva for four years retroactive to 25 December 2021 for an anti-doping rule violation. On 30 January 2024, the ISU reallocated medals, upgrading the United States to gold and Japan to silver while downgrading the ROC to bronze. As such, Russia's totals changed from six gold medals and 14 bronze medals to five gold medals and 15 bronze medals.)

== Competitors ==
The following is the list of number of competitors participating at the Games per sport/discipline.

Sport	Men	Women	Total
Alpine skiing	3	4	7
Biathlon	5	5	10
Bobsleigh	8	4	12
Cross-country skiing	8	8	16
Curling	5	5	10
Figure skating	9	9	18
Freestyle skiing	8	14	22
Ice hockey	25	23	48
Luge	7	3	10
Nordic combined	3	—	3
Short track speed skating	5	4	9
Skeleton	3	3	6
Ski jumping	4	4	8
Snowboarding	6	9	15
Speed skating	8	7	15
Total	107	102	209

== Medalists ==
Medal	Name	Sport	Event	Date
Gold	Alexander Bolshunov	Cross-country skiing	Men's 30 km skiathlon	6 February
Gold	Natalya Nepryayeva; Tatiana Sorina; Veronika Stepanova; Yuliya Stupak	Cross-country skiing	Women's 4 × 5 km relay	12 February
Gold	Alexander Bolshunov; Aleksey Chervotkin; Denis Spitsov; Sergey Ustiugov	Cross-country skiing	Men's 4 × 10 km relay	13 February
Gold	Anna Shcherbakova	Figure skating	Women's singles	17 February
Gold	Alexander Bolshunov	Cross-country skiing	Men's 50 kilometre freestyle	19 February
Silver	Natalya Nepryayeva	Cross-country skiing	Women's 15 km skiathlon	5 February
Silver	Denis Spitsov	Cross-country skiing	Men's 30 km skiathlon	6 February
Silver	Irina Avvakumova; Evgenii Klimov; Irma Makhinia; Danil Sadreev	Ski jumping	Mixed team	7 February
Silver	Alexander Bolshunov	Cross-country skiing	Men's 15 km classical	11 February
Silver	Konstantin Ivliev	Short track speed skating	Men's 500 metres	13 February
Silver	Nikita Katsalapov; Victoria Sinitsina	Figure skating	Ice dance	14 February
Silver	Daniil Aldoshkin; Sergey Trofimov; Ruslan Zakharov	Speed skating	Men's team pursuit	15 February
Silver	Irina Kazakevich; Svetlana Mironova; Uliana Nigmatullina; Kristina Reztsova	Biathlon	Women's relay	16 February
Silver	Alexandra Trusova	Figure skating	Women's singles	17 February
Silver	Ivan Yakimushkin	Cross-country skiing	Men's 50 kilometre freestyle	19 February
Silver	Vladimir Morozov; Evgenia Tarasova	Figure skating	Pair skating	19 February
Silver	Russia men's national ice hockey team: Sergei Andronov; Timur Bilyalov; Andrei Chibisov; Ivan Fedotov; Stanislav Galiev; Mikhail Grigorenko; Arseni Gritsyuk; Nikita Gusev; Pavel Karnaukhov; Artur Kayumov; Artyom Minulin; Nikita Nesterov; Alexander Nikishin; Sergei Plotnikov; Alexander Samonov; Kirill Semyonov; Damir Sharipzyanov; Vadim Shipachyov; Anton Slepyshev; Sergei Telegin; Vladimir Tkachyov; Dmitri Voronkov; Slava Voynov; Egor Yakovlev; Alexander Yelesin	Ice hockey	Men's tournament	20 February
Bronze	Uliana Nigmatullina; Kristina Reztsova; Alexander Loginov; Eduard Latypov	Biathlon	Mixed relay	5 February
Bronze	Anastasia Smirnova	Freestyle skiing	Women's moguls	6 February
Bronze	Aleksandr Galliamov; Nikita Katsalapov; Mark Kondratiuk; Anastasia Mishina; Victoria Sinitsina; ~~Kamila Valieva~~ (DSQ)	Figure skating	Team event	7 February
Bronze	Vic Wild	Snowboarding	Men's parallel giant slalom	8 February
Bronze	Alexander Terentyev	Cross-country skiing	Men's sprint	8 February
Bronze	Tatiana Ivanova	Luge	Women's singles	8 February
Bronze	Semion Elistratov	Short track speed skating	Men's 1500 metres	9 February
Bronze	Eduard Latypov	Biathlon	Men's pursuit	13 February
Bronze	Angelina Golikova	Speed skating	Women's 500 metres	13 February
Bronze	Said Karimulla Khalili; Eduard Latypov; Alexander Loginov; Maxim Tsvetkov	Biathlon	Men's relay	15 February
Bronze	Natalya Nepryayeva; Yuliya Stupak	Cross-country skiing	Women's team sprint	16 February
Bronze	Alexander Bolshunov; Alexander Terentyev	Cross-country skiing	Men's team sprint	16 February
Bronze	Ilya Burov	Freestyle skiing	Men's aerials	16 February
Bronze	Sergey Ridzik	Freestyle skiing	Men's ski cross	18 February
Bronze	Aleksandr Galliamov; Anastasia Mishina	Figure skating	Pair skating	19 February

Medals by sport
Sport	1st place, gold medalist(s)	2nd place, silver medalist(s)	3rd place, bronze medalist(s)	Total
Cross-country skiing	4	4	3	11
Figure skating	1	3	2	6
Biathlon	0	1	3	4
Short track speed skating	0	1	1	2
Speed skating	0	1	1	2
Ice hockey	0	1	0	1
Ski jumping	0	1	0	1
Freestyle skiing	0	0	3	3
Luge	0	0	1	1
Snowboarding	0	0	1	1
Total	5	12	15	32

Medals by date
Day	Date	1st place, gold medalist(s)	2nd place, silver medalist(s)	3rd place, bronze medalist(s)	Total
Day 1	5 February	0	1	1	2
Day 2	6 February	1	1	1	3
Day 3	7 February	0	1	1	2
Day 4	8 February	0	0	3	3
Day 5	9 February	0	0	1	1
Day 6	10 February	0	0	0	0
Day 7	11 February	0	1	0	1
Day 8	12 February	1	0	0	1
Day 9	13 February	1	1	2	4
Day 10	14 February	0	1	0	1
Day 11	15 February	0	1	1	2
Day 12	16 February	0	1	3	4
Day 13	17 February	1	1	0	2
Day 14	18 February	0	0	1	1
Day 15	19 February	1	2	1	4
Day 16	20 February	0	1	0	1
Total		5	12	15	32

Medals by gender
Gender	1st place, gold medalist(s)	2nd place, silver medalist(s)	3rd place, bronze medalist(s)	Total	Percentage
Female	2	3	4	9	28.1%
Male	3	6	8	17	50%
Mixed	0	3	3	6	18.8%
Total	5	12	15	32	100%

== Alpine skiing ==
Russia qualified three male and one female alpine skiers, then claimed three additional female quotas during reallocation.

Russian Alpine Skiing Federation announced the 3 men and 4 women participating on 19 January 2022.

Men

Athlete	Event	Run 1		Run 2		Total	
Athlete	Event	Time	Rank	Time	Rank	Time	Rank
Aleksandr Andrienko	Giant slalom	DNF		Did not advance			
Aleksandr Andrienko	Slalom	57.47	31	53.70	26	1:51.17	26
Aleksandr Khoroshilov	Slalom	54.63	10	50.54	9	1:45.17	10
Ivan Kuznetsov	Giant slalom	DNF		Did not advance			
Ivan Kuznetsov	Slalom	DNF		Did not advance			

Women

Athlete	Event	Run 1		Run 2		Total	
Athlete	Event	Time	Rank	Time	Rank	Time	Rank
Anastasia Gornostaeva	Slalom	56.39	39	55.11	32	1:51.50	33
Polina Melnikova	Giant slalom	1:04.13	39	1:03.07	31	2:07.20	32
Polina Melnikova	Slalom	56.86	41	55.88	35	1:52.74	36
Julia Pleshkova	Combined	1:33.54	14	57.16	11	2:30.70	10
Julia Pleshkova	Downhill	—N/a				1:34.48	20
Julia Pleshkova	Giant slalom	1:02.01	33	1:01.31	28	2:03.32	27
Julia Pleshkova	Super-G	—N/a				1:15.26	18
Ekaterina Tkachenko	Giant slalom	1:01.55	31	1:00.86	25	2:02.41	25
Ekaterina Tkachenko	Slalom	55.97	34	54.71	31	1:50.68	31

Mixed

Athlete	Event	Round of 16	Quarterfinals	Semifinals	Final / BM	Rank
Athlete	Event	Opposition Result	Opposition Result	Opposition Result	Opposition Result	Rank
Aleksandr Andrienko; Anastasia Gornostaeva; Ivan Kuznetsov; Julia Pleshkova; Ekaterina Tkachenko	Team	Italy; L 1–3	Did not advance			11

== Biathlon ==
Based on their Nations Cup rankings in the 2020–21 Biathlon World Cup and 2021–22 Biathlon World Cup, Russian Olympic Committee has qualified a team of 5 men and 5 women.

Russian Biathlon Union announced the 5 men and 5 women participating on 17 January 2022. On 30 January 2022 Valeriia Vasnetsova, who was already in Beijing, was replaced with Evgeniya Burtasova due to positive COVID-19 tests.

Men

Athlete	Event	Time	Misses	Rank
Said Karimulla Khalili	Individual	53:26.5	4 (2+1+0+1)	34
Eduard Latypov	Individual	51:13.1	3 (0+1+1+1)	11
Eduard Latypov	Sprint	25:14.8	3 (2+1)	11
Eduard Latypov	Pursuit	39:42.8	1 (0+0+0+1)	3rd place, bronze medalist(s)
Eduard Latypov	Mass start	41:35.4	7 (1+3+1+2)	19
Alexandr Loginov	Individual	50:27.6	3 (0+1+0+2)	10
Alexandr Loginov	Sprint	26:15.5	4 (2+2)	38
Alexandr Loginov	Pursuit	43:44.1	5 (0+1+3+1)	27
Alexandr Loginov	Mass start	41:06.2	7 (2+0+2+3)	15
Daniil Serokhvostov	Sprint	25:38.0	2 (0+2)	19
Daniil Serokhvostov	Pursuit	44:34.8	8 (4+2+1+1)	39
Maxim Tsvetkov	Individual	49:22.3	1 (0+0+0+1)	4
Maxim Tsvetkov	Sprint	24:41.0	0 (0+0)	4
Maxim Tsvetkov	Pursuit	42:56.2	6 (2+3+0+1)	17
Maxim Tsvetkov	Mass start	41:37.7	6 (1+1+2+2)	20
Said Karimulla Khalili; Alexander Loginov; Maxim Tsvetkov; Eduard Latypov	Team relay	1:20:35.5	2+6	3rd place, bronze medalist(s)

Women

Athlete	Event	Time	Misses	Rank
Evgeniya Burtasova	Individual	53:20.3	6 (1+0+2+3)	77
Irina Kazakevich	Sprint	22:23.7	1 (0+1)	20
Irina Kazakevich	Pursuit	38:25.8	3 (0+0+2+1)	23
Irina Kazakevich	Mass start	43:34.6	7 (1+3+2+1)	20
Svetlana Mironova	Individual	47:59.3	3 (0+1+1+1)	23
Svetlana Mironova	Sprint	23:17.6	3 (0+3)	47
Svetlana Mironova	Pursuit	40:25.4	6 (0+0+1+5)	41
Uliana Nigmatullina	Individual	53:42.1	10 (1+2+3+4)	78
Uliana Nigmatullina	Sprint	22:11.8	2 (2+0)	13
Uliana Nigmatullina	Pursuit	37:33.2	3 (0+2+1+0)	11
Uliana Nigmatullina	Mass start	43:14.3	6 (2+1+3+0)	17
Kristina Reztsova	Individual	45:25.8	2 (0+0+2+0)	9
Kristina Reztsova	Sprint	21:49.3	2 (1+1)	6
Kristina Reztsova	Pursuit	38:41.6	7 (2+2+1+2)	26
Kristina Reztsova	Mass start	41:29.0	6 (2+1+1+2)	5
Irina Kazakevich; Kristina Reztsova; Svetlana Mironova; Uliana Nigmatullina	Team relay	1:11:15.9	1+7	2nd place, silver medalist(s)

Mixed

Athlete	Event	Time	Misses	Rank
Uliana Nigmatullina; Kristina Reztsova; Alexander Loginov; Eduard Latypov	Mixed Relay	1:06:47.1	1+13	3rd place, bronze medalist(s)

== Bobsleigh ==
Based on their rankings in the 2021–22 Bobsleigh World Cup, Russian Olympic Committee qualified 7 sleds. Bobsleigh Federation of Russia announced the competing athletes on 17 January 2022 and full squads of crews on 22 January 2022. On 4 February 2022 Vasiliy Kondratenko and Aleksei Pushkarev were replaced with Alexey Zaitsev and Vladislav Zharovtsev due to positive COVID-19 tests.

Men

Athlete	Event	Run 1		Run 2		Run 3		Run 4		Total	
Athlete	Event	Time	Rank	Time	Rank	Time	Rank	Time	Rank	Time	Rank
Maksim Andrianov*; Vladislav Zharovtsev	Two-man	1:00.24	22	1:00.75	26	1:00.55	26	Did not advance		3:01.54	25
Rostislav Gaitiukevich*; Aleksei Laptev	Two-man	59.41	3	59.91	5	59.80	9	1:00.19	14	3:59.31	8
Maxim Andrianov*; Dmitrii Lopin; Alexey Zaitsev; Vladislav Zharovtsev	Four-man	58.82	9	59.30	9	59.03	9	59.40	8	3:56.55	8
Rostislav Gaitiukevich*; Alexey Laptev; Mikhail Mordasov; Pavel Travkin	Four-man	58.54	4	59.24	8	58.81	7	59.56	14	3:56.15	7

Women

Athlete	Event	Run 1		Run 2		Run 3		Run 4		Total	
Athlete	Event	Time	Rank	Time	Rank	Time	Rank	Time	Rank	Time	Rank
Nadezhda Sergeeva	Monobob	1:05.45	9	1:06.00	13	1:05.83	10	1:06.31	11	4:23.59	10
Anastasiia Makarova*; Elena Mamedova	Two-woman	1:01.83	10	1:02.29	16	1:02.48	20	1:02.49	19	4:09.09	19
Nadezhda Sergeeva*; Yulia Belomestnykh	Two-woman	1:02.04	16	1:01.90	8	1:02.34	18	1:01.83	7	4:08.11	9

== Cross-country skiing ==
Russia qualified the maximum of eight male and eight female cross-country skiers. Russian Cross-Country Ski Federation announced the 8 men and 8 women participating on 11 January 2022.

Distance
Men

Athlete	Event	Classical		Freestyle		Final		
Athlete	Event	Time	Rank	Time	Rank	Time	Deficit	Rank
Alexander Bolshunov	15 km classical	—N/a				38:18.0	+23.2	2nd place, silver medalist(s)
Alexander Bolshunov	30 km skiathlon	39:05.6	1	36:32.3	1	1:16:09.8	–	1st place, gold medalist(s)
Alexander Bolshunov	50 km freestyle	—N/a				1:11:32.7	–	1st place, gold medalist(s)
Aleksey Chervotkin	15 km classical	—N/a				38:51.7	+56.9	5
Aleksey Chervotkin	30 km skiathlon	41:41.0	32	42:44.5	46	1:24:59.5	+8:49.7	36
Artem Maltsev	30 km skiathlon	40:38.4	10	38:53.9	14	1:20:04.6	+3:54.8	9
Artem Maltsev	50 km freestyle	—N/a				1:11:43.4	+10.7	4
Ilia Semikov	15 km classical	—N/a				39:34.7	+1:39.9	9
Denis Spitsov	30 km skiathlon	39:36.1	3	37:14.6	2	1:17:20.8	+1:11.0	2nd place, silver medalist(s)
Denis Spitsov	50 km freestyle	—N/a				1:11:58.9	+26.2	6
Ivan Yakimushkin	15 km classical	—N/a				39:52.6	+1:57.8	13
Ivan Yakimushkin	50 km freestyle	—N/a				1:11:38.2	+5.5	2nd place, silver medalist(s)
Aleksey Chervotkin; Alexander Bolshunov; Denis Spitsov; Sergey Ustiugov	4 × 10 km relay	—N/a				1:54:50.7	–	1st place, gold medalist(s)

Women

Athlete	Event	Classical		Freestyle		Final		
Athlete	Event	Time	Rank	Time	Rank	Time	Deficit	Rank
Mariya Istomina	30 km freestyle	—N/a				1:28:00.1	+3:06.1	9
Natalya Nepryayeva	10 km classical	—N/a				28:37.9	+31.6	4
Natalya Nepryayeva	15 km skiathlon	22:42.3	7	21:24.6	5	44:43.9	+30.2	2nd place, silver medalist(s)
Natalya Nepryayeva	30 km freestyle	—N/a				Did not finish		
Anastasia Rygalina	15 km skiathlon	23:39.8	16	21:14.3	3	45:30.9	+1:17.2	8
Anastasia Rygalina	30 km freestyle	—N/a				1:31:22.1	+6:28.1	17
Tatiana Sorina	10 km classical	—N/a				29:17.4	+1:11.1	10
Tatiana Sorina	15 km skiathlon	23:34.7	14	22:19.1	10	46:31.3	+2:17.6	11
Tatiana Sorina	30 km freestyle	—N/a				1:27:31.2	+2:37.2	5
Yuliya Stupak	10 km classical	—N/a				29:03.8	+57.5	7
Yuliya Stupak	15 km skiathlon	23:38.0	15	24:02.8	40	48:27.5	+4:13.8	24
Liliya Vasilyeva	10 km classical	—N/a				29:32.4	+1:26.1	15
Yuliya Stupak; Natalya Nepryayeva; Tatiana Sorina; Veronika Stepanova	4 × 5 km relay	—N/a				53:41.0	–	1st place, gold medalist(s)

Sprint
Men

Athlete	Event	Qualification		Quarterfinal		Semifinal		Final	Rank
Athlete	Event	Time	Rank	Time	Rank	Time	Rank	Time	Rank
Aleksandr Bolshunov	Sprint	Did not start							
Artem Maltsev	Sprint	2:50.90	10 Q	2:50.37	2 Q	2:51.50	4 q	3:01.65	5
Alexander Terentyev	Sprint	2:50.92	12 Q	2:57.93	2 Q	2:50.67	1 Q	2:59.37	3rd place, bronze medalist(s)
Sergey Ustiugov	Sprint	2:46.51	2 Q	2:51.94	2 Q	2:52.35	4	Did not advance	8
Alexander Bolshunov; Alexander Terentyev	Team sprint	—N/a				20:07.85	5 q	19:27.28	3rd place, bronze medalist(s)

Women

Athlete	Event	Qualification		Quarterfinal		Semifinal		Final	Rank
Athlete	Event	Time	Rank	Time	Rank	Time	Rank	Time	Rank
Hristina Matsokina	Sprint	3:29.64	45	Did not advance					45
Natalia Nepryaeva	Sprint	3:21.76	20 Q	3:21.34	3	Did not advance			14
Veronika Stepanova	Sprint	3:20.41	12 Q	3:18.09	1 Q	3:16.22	3	Did not advance	7
Yuliya Stupak	Sprint	3:17.01	4 Q	3:18.65	4	Did not advance			16
Yuliya Stupak; Natalya Nepryayeva	Team sprint	—N/a				23:00.47	1 Q	22:10.56	3rd place, bronze medalist(s)

== Curling ==
Based on results of the 2021 World Curling Championships and Olympic Qualification Event, Russian Olympic Committee has qualified for men's and women's tournaments. Russian Curling Federation announced the five men and five women participating on 4 January 2022.

Summary

Team	Event	Group stage										Semifinal	Final / BM	
Team	Event	Opposition Score	Opposition Score	Opposition Score	Opposition Score	Opposition Score	Opposition Score	Opposition Score	Opposition Score	Opposition Score	Rank	Opposition Score	Opposition Score	Rank
Sergey Glukhov; Evgeny Klimov; Dmitry Mironov; Anton Kalalb; Daniil Goriachev	Men's tournament	USA; L 5–6	CHN; W 7–4	SUI; L 3–6	DEN; W 10–2	ITA; W 10–7	SWE; L 5–7	NOR; L 5–12	CAN; W 7–6	GBR; L 6–8	8	Did not advance		
Alina Kovaleva; Yulia Portunova; Galina Arsenkina; Ekaterina Kuzmina; Maria Komarova	Women's tournament	USA; L 3–9	SUI; L 7–8	KOR; L 5–9	JPN; L 5–10	CAN; L 5–11	DEN; L 5–10	CHN; W 11–5	SWE; L 5–8	GBR; L 4–9	10	Did not advance		

=== Men's tournament ===
Russia has qualified their men's team (five athletes), by finishing in the top six teams in the 2021 World Men's Curling Championship.

Final Round Robin Standings
Team	Skip	Pld	W	L	W–L	PF	PA	EW	EL	BE	SE	S%	DSC	Qualification
Great Britain	Bruce Mouat	9	8	1	–	63	44	39	31	5	10	88.0%	18.81	Playoffs
Sweden	Niklas Edin	9	7	2	–	64	44	43	30	10	11	85.7%	14.02	Playoffs
Canada	Brad Gushue	9	5	4	1–0	58	50	34	38	7	7	84.4%	26.49	Playoffs
United States	John Shuster	9	5	4	0–1	56	61	35	41	4	5	83.0%	32.29	Playoffs
China	Ma Xiuyue	9	4	5	2–1; 1–0	59	62	39	36	6	4	85.4%	23.55	
Norway	Steffen Walstad	9	4	5	2–1; 0–1	58	53	40	36	0	11	84.4%	20.96	
Switzerland	Peter de Cruz	9	4	5	1–2; 1–0	51	54	33	38	13	3	84.5%	15.74	
ROC	Sergey Glukhov	9	4	5	1–2; 0–1	58	58	33	38	6	6	81.2%	33.72	
Italy	Joël Retornaz	9	3	6	–	59	65	36	35	3	8	81.7%	30.76	
Denmark	Mikkel Krause	9	1	8	–	36	71	30	39	3	2	78.1%	32.84	

Round robin

Russia had a bye in draws 5, 7 and 12.

Draw 1

Wednesday, 9 February, 20:05

Sheet B	1	2	3	4	5	6	7	8	9	10	11	Final
United States (Shuster) 🔨	1	0	0	0	1	1	0	2	0	0	1	6
ROC (Glukhov)	0	0	1	2	0	0	1	0	0	1	0	5

Draw 2

Thursday, 10 February, 14:05

Sheet C	1	2	3	4	5	6	7	8	9	10	Final
China (Ma) 🔨	1	1	0	1	0	0	0	1	0	X	4
ROC (Glukhov)	0	0	1	0	1	1	0	0	4	X	7

Draw 3

Friday, 11 February, 9:05

Sheet A	1	2	3	4	5	6	7	8	9	10	Final
Switzerland (de Cruz) 🔨	0	0	3	0	0	0	0	3	0	X	6
ROC (Glukhov)	0	0	0	2	1	0	0	0	0	X	3

Draw 4

Friday, 11 February, 20:05

Sheet B	1	2	3	4	5	6	7	8	9	10	Final
ROC (Glukhov) 🔨	0	2	0	2	6	0	X	X	X	X	10
Denmark (Krause)	0	0	1	0	0	1	X	X	X	X	2

Draw 6

Sunday, 13 February, 9:05

Sheet D	1	2	3	4	5	6	7	8	9	10	Final
Italy (Retornaz)	0	0	3	0	3	0	0	1	0	X	7
ROC (Glukhov) 🔨	0	3	0	3	0	0	1	0	3	X	10

Draw 8

Monday, 14 February, 14:05

Sheet C	1	2	3	4	5	6	7	8	9	10	Final
ROC (Glukhov)	0	1	0	0	0	2	0	2	0	0	5
Sweden (Edin) 🔨	1	0	0	2	1	0	2	0	0	1	7

Draw 9

Tuesday, 15 February, 9:05

Sheet A	1	2	3	4	5	6	7	8	9	10	Final
ROC (Glukhov)	0	1	0	0	2	0	2	0	0	X	5
Norway (Walstad) 🔨	3	0	1	4	0	1	0	1	2	X	12

Draw 10

Tuesday, 15 February, 20:05

Sheet D	1	2	3	4	5	6	7	8	9	10	11	Final
ROC (Glukhov) 🔨	0	1	1	1	0	1	0	0	2	0	1	7
Canada (Gushue)	1	0	0	0	1	0	1	1	0	2	0	6

Draw 11

Wednesday, 16 February, 14:05

Sheet B	1	2	3	4	5	6	7	8	9	10	Final
Great Britain (Mouat) 🔨	3	0	1	1	0	1	0	1	0	1	8
ROC (Glukhov)	0	1	0	0	1	0	2	0	2	0	6

=== Women's tournament ===
Russia has qualified their women's team (five athletes), by finishing in the top six teams in the 2021 World Women's Curling Championship.

Final Round Robin Standings
Team	Skip	Pld	W	L	W–L	PF	PA	EW	EL	BE	SE	S%	DSC	Qualification
Switzerland	Silvana Tirinzoni	9	8	1	–	67	46	44	36	4	12	81.6%	19.14	Playoffs
Sweden	Anna Hasselborg	9	7	2	–	64	49	39	35	6	12	82.0%	25.02	Playoffs
Great Britain	Eve Muirhead	9	5	4	1–1	63	47	39	33	4	9	80.6%	35.27	Playoffs
Japan	Satsuki Fujisawa	9	5	4	1–1	64	62	40	36	2	13	82.3%	36.00	Playoffs
Canada	Jennifer Jones	9	5	4	1–1	71	59	42	41	1	14	80.4%	45.44	
United States	Tabitha Peterson	9	4	5	2–0	60	64	40	39	2	12	79.5%	33.87	
China	Han Yu	9	4	5	1–1	56	67	38	41	3	10	79.6%	30.06	
South Korea	Kim Eun-jung	9	4	5	0–2	62	66	40	42	3	10	80.8%	27.79	
Denmark	Madeleine Dupont	9	2	7	–	50	68	33	41	7	0	77.2%	23.36	
ROC	Alina Kovaleva	9	1	8	–	50	79	34	45	2	7	78.9%	29.34	

Round robin

Russia had a bye in draws 2, 6 and 10.

Draw 1

Thursday, 10 February, 9:05

Sheet D	1	2	3	4	5	6	7	8	9	10	Final
ROC (Kovaleva)	0	1	0	0	0	2	0	X	X	X	3
United States (Peterson) 🔨	2	0	1	1	2	0	3	X	X	X	9

Draw 3

Friday, 11 February, 14:05

Sheet C	1	2	3	4	5	6	7	8	9	10	Final
Switzerland (Tirinzoni) 🔨	2	0	0	1	0	0	2	3	0	0	8
ROC (Kovaleva)	0	0	1	0	1	2	0	0	2	1	7

Draw 4

Saturday, 12 February, 9:05

Sheet B	1	2	3	4	5	6	7	8	9	10	Final
South Korea (Kim) 🔨	1	0	2	1	2	0	2	0	1	X	9
ROC (Kovaleva)	0	2	0	0	0	1	0	2	0	X	5

Draw 5

Saturday, 12 February, 20:05

Sheet A	1	2	3	4	5	6	7	8	9	10	Final
ROC (Kovaleva) 🔨	1	0	1	2	0	1	0	0	0	0	5
Japan (Fujisawa)	0	1	0	0	1	0	3	1	1	3	10

Draw 7

Monday, 14 February, 9:05

Sheet C	1	2	3	4	5	6	7	8	9	10	Final
Canada (Jones)	2	2	0	2	0	2	0	1	2	X	11
ROC (Kovaleva) 🔨	0	0	1	0	2	0	2	0	0	X	5

Draw 8

Monday, 14 February, 20:05

Sheet D	1	2	3	4	5	6	7	8	9	10	Final
Denmark (Dupont) 🔨	2	0	0	1	0	1	0	3	0	3	10
ROC (Kovaleva)	0	2	0	0	1	0	1	0	1	0	5

Draw 9

Tuesday, 15 February, 14:05

Sheet A	1	2	3	4	5	6	7	8	9	10	Final
China (Han) 🔨	2	0	0	2	0	1	0	0	X	X	5
ROC (Kovaleva)	0	1	1	0	4	0	3	2	X	X	11

Draw 11

Wednesday, 16 February, 20:05

Sheet C	1	2	3	4	5	6	7	8	9	10	Final
ROC (Kovaleva) 🔨	2	1	0	1	0	0	1	0	0	0	5
Sweden (Hasselborg)	0	0	2	0	1	1	0	2	0	2	8

Draw 12

Thursday, 17 February, 14:05

Sheet B	1	2	3	4	5	6	7	8	9	10	Final
ROC (Kovaleva)	0	1	0	1	0	0	1	1	0	X	4
Great Britain (Muirhead) 🔨	2	0	1	0	1	1	0	0	4	X	9

== Figure skating ==
In the 2021 World Figure Skating Championships in Stockholm, Sweden, Russia secured three quotas in the women's, pairs, ice dance competitions, and at least two quotas in the men's competition. A third men's quota was secured at the 2021 CS Nebelhorn Trophy. Figure Skating Federation of Russia announced the 9 men and 9 women participating on 20 January 2022. On 25 January 2022, singles skater Mikhail Kolyada was replaced with Evgeni Semenenko due to a positive COVID-19 test.

Athletes	Event	SP / RD		FS / FD		Total	
Athletes	Event	Points	Rank	Points	Rank	Points	Rank
Mark Kondratiuk	Men's	86.11	15 Q	162.71	14	248.82	15
Andrei Mozalev	Men's	77.05	23 Q	156.28	18	233.33	19
Evgeni Semenenko	Men's	95.76	7 Q	178.37	9	274.13	8
Anna Shcherbakova	Women's	80.20	2 Q	175.75	2	255.95	1st place, gold medalist(s)
Alexandra Trusova	Women's	74.60	4 Q	177.13	1	251.73	2nd place, silver medalist(s)
Kamila Valieva	Women's	~~82.16~~	~~1 Q~~	~~141.93~~	~~5~~	~~224.09~~	DSQ
Aleksandra Boikova / Dmitrii Kozlovskii	Pairs	78.59	4 Q	141.91	4	220.50	4
Anastasia Mishina / Aleksandr Galliamov	Pairs	82.76	3 Q	154.95	3	237.71	3rd place, bronze medalist(s)
Evgenia Tarasova / Vladimir Morozov	Pairs	84.25	2 Q	155.00	2	239.25	2nd place, silver medalist(s)
Diana Davis / Gleb Smolkin	Ice dance	71.66	14 Q	108.16	14	179.82	14
Victoria Sinitsina / Nikita Katsalapov	Ice dance	88.85	2 Q	131.66	2	220.51	2nd place, silver medalist(s)
Alexandra Stepanova / Ivan Bukin	Ice dance	84.09	5 Q	120.98	8	205.07	6

Team event

Athlete	Event	Short program / Rhythm dance						Free skate / Free dance				Total	
Athlete	Event	Men's	Ladies'	Pairs	Ice dance	Total		Men's	Ladies'	Pairs	Ice dance	Total	
Athlete	Event	Points Team points	Points Team points	Points Team points	Points Team points	Points	Rank	Points Team points	Points Team points	Points Team points	Points Team points	Points	Rank
Mark Kondratiuk; ~~Kamila Valieva~~ (DSQ); Anastasia Mishina / Aleksandr Galliamov; Victoria Sinitsina / Nikita Katsalapov	Team event	95.81; 8	~~90.18~~; ~~10~~; DSQ	82.64; 9	85.05; 9	36	~~1 Q~~	181.65; 9	~~178.92~~; ~~10~~; DSQ	145.20; 10	128.17; 9	~~74~~; 54	(bronze)

== Freestyle skiing ==
Russian Freestyle Skiing Federation announced the 9 men and 13 women competing on 20 January 2022. 14th woman was announced on 25 January 2022.

Aerials

Athlete	Event	Qualification					Final					Rank
Athlete	Event	Jump 1		Jump 2			Final 1				Final 2	Rank
Athlete	Event	Points	Rank	Points	Best	Rank	Jump 1	Jump 2	Best	Rank	Points	Rank
Ilya Burov	Men's aerials	117.65	9	120.36	120.36	3 Q	109.05	129.50	129.50	1 Q	114.93	3rd place, bronze medalist(s)
Maxim Burov	Men's aerials	95.02	21	113.28	113.28	10	Did not advance					16
Stanislav Nikitin	Men's aerials	119.47	7	86.88	119.47	4 Q	117.26	119.00	119.00	10	Did not advance	10
Liubov Nikitina	Women's aerials	63.80	23	69.30	69.30	15	Did not advance					21
Eseniia Pantiukhova	Women's aerials	82.84	10	77.43	82.84	5 Q	78.75	58.29	78.75	9	Did not advance	9
Anastasiia Prytkova	Women's aerials	78.43	14	77.43	78.43	10	Did not advance					16
Liubov Nikitina; Ilya Burov; Stanislav Nikitin	Mixed team	—N/a					295.97	—N/a		5	Did not advance	5

Big air

Athlete	Event	Qualification					Final				
Athlete	Event	Run 1	Run 2	Run 3	Total	Rank	Run 1	Run 2	Run 3	Total	Rank
Ksenia Orlova	Women's big air	60.00	54.75	~~9.00~~	114.75	19	Did not advance				
Anastasia Tatalina	Women's big air	~~68.75~~	89.75	73.50	163.25	3 Q	75.50	~~22.25~~	47.00	122.50	10

Halfpipe

Athlete	Event	Qualification				Final				
Athlete	Event	Run 1	Run 2	Best	Rank	Run 1	Run 2	Run 3	Best	Rank
Alexandra Glazkova	Women's halfpipe	67.00	69.25	69.25	14	Did not advance				

Moguls

Athlete	Event	Qualification					Final					Rank
Athlete	Event	Run 1		Run 2			Run 1		Run 2		Run 3	Rank
Athlete	Event	Points	Rank	Points	Best	Rank	Points	Rank	Points	Rank	Points	Rank
Nikita Andreev	Men's moguls	67.39	27	74.62	74.62	9 Q	76.95	8 Q	Did not finish		Did not advance	12
Nikita Novitskii	Men's moguls	74.71	13	75.65	75.65	6 Q	75.88	13	Did not advance			13
Polina Chudinova	Women's moguls	66.77	17	70.93	70.93	5 Q	70.36	17	Did not advance			17
Viktoriia Lazarenko	Women's moguls	29.65	25	65.77	65.77	13	Did not advance					23
Anastasiia Pervushina	Women's moguls	59.97	22	63.97	63.97	14	Did not advance					24
Anastasia Smirnova	Women's moguls	73.01	8 QF	Bye			73.76	10 Q	78.64	4 Q	77.72	3rd place, bronze medalist(s)

Ski cross

Athlete	Event	Seeding		1/8 final	Quarterfinal	Semifinal	Final	Rank
Athlete	Event	Time	Rank	Position	Position	Position	Position	Rank
Igor Omelin	Men's ski cross	1:12.28	2	1 Q	4	Did not advance		13
Sergey Ridzik	Men's ski cross	1:13.95	29	1 Q	1 Q	2 Q	3	3rd place, bronze medalist(s)
Kirill Sysoev	Men's ski cross	1:13.36	20	4	Did not advance			25
Anastasia Chirtsova	Women's ski cross	1:21.53	22	2 Q	4	Did not advance		16
Ekaterina Maltseva	Women's ski cross	1:19.45	14	3	Did not advance			19
Elizaveta Ponkratova	Women's ski cross	1:19.56	17	3	Did not advance			21
Natalia Sherina	Women's ski cross	1:19.49	15	3	Did not advance			20

Qualification legend: FA – Qualify to medal round; FB – Qualify to consolation round

Slopestyle

Athlete	Event	Qualification				Final				
Athlete	Event	Run 1	Run 2	Best	Rank	Run 1	Run 2	Run 3	Best	Rank
Ksenia Orlova	Women's slopestyle	45.31	32.20	45.31	21	Did not advance				
Anastasia Tatalina	Women's slopestyle	63.85	72.03	72.03	5 Q	39.38	74.16	75.51	75.51	4

== Ice hockey ==
Russia has qualified 25 male and 23 female competitors to the ice hockey tournaments as part of their two teams.

Summary

Team	Event	Group stage					Qualification playoff	Quarterfinal	Semifinal	Final / BM	Rank
Team	Event	Opposition Score	Opposition Score	Opposition Score	Opposition Score	Rank	Opposition Score	Opposition Score	Opposition Score	Opposition Score	Rank
ROC men's	Men's tournament	Switzerland; W 1–0	Denmark; W 2–0	Czech Republic; L 5–6 OT	—N/a	1 QQ	Bye	Denmark; W 3–1	Sweden; W 2–1 GWS	Finland; L 1–2	2nd place, silver medalist(s)
ROC women's	Women's tournament	Switzerland; W 5–2	United States; L 0–5	Canada; L 1–6	Finland; L 0–5	4	—N/a	Switzerland; L 2–4	Did not advance		5

=== Men's tournament ===
Russia men's national ice hockey team qualified by being ranked 2nd in the 2019 IIHF World Rankings.

Team roster

The roster was announced on 23 January 2022.

Head coach: Alexei Zhamnov

No.	Pos.	Name	Height	Weight	Birthdate	Team
4	D	Alexander Yelesin	1.81 m (5 ft 11 in)	87 kg (192 lb)	7 February 1996 (aged 26)	(Russia) Lokomotiv Yaroslavl
7	D	Sergei Telegin	1.81 m (5 ft 11 in)	78 kg (172 lb)	21 September 2000 (aged 21)	(Russia) Traktor Chelyabinsk
10	F	Dmitri Voronkov	1.92 m (6 ft 4 in)	86 kg (190 lb)	10 September 2000 (aged 21)	(Russia) Ak Bars Kazan
11	F	Sergei Andronov (A)	1.89 m (6 ft 2 in)	94 kg (207 lb)	19 July 1989 (aged 32)	(Russia) HC CSKA Moscow
15	F	Pavel Karnaukhov	1.90 m (6 ft 3 in)	96 kg (212 lb)	15 March 1997 (aged 24)	(Russia) HC CSKA Moscow
16	F	Sergei Plotnikov	1.87 m (6 ft 2 in)	93 kg (205 lb)	3 June 1990 (aged 31)	(Russia) HC CSKA Moscow
22	F	Stanislav Galiev	1.88 m (6 ft 2 in)	82 kg (181 lb)	17 January 1992 (aged 30)	(Russia) HC Dynamo Moscow
24	F	Artur Kayumov	1.81 m (5 ft 11 in)	82 kg (181 lb)	14 February 1998 (aged 23)	(Russia) Lokomotiv Yaroslavl
25	F	Mikhail Grigorenko	1.90 m (6 ft 3 in)	97 kg (214 lb)	16 May 1994 (aged 27)	(Russia) HC CSKA Moscow
27	D	Slava Voynov	1.82 m (6 ft 0 in)	87 kg (192 lb)	15 January 1990 (aged 32)	(Russia) HC Dynamo Moscow
28	G	Ivan Fedotov	2.00 m (6 ft 7 in)	94 kg (207 lb)	28 November 1996 (aged 25)	(Russia) HC CSKA Moscow
31	G	Alexander Samonov	1.82 m (6 ft 0 in)	76 kg (168 lb)	23 August 1995 (aged 26)	(Russia) SKA Saint Petersburg
43	D	Damir Sharipzyanov	1.88 m (6 ft 2 in)	94 kg (207 lb)	17 February 1996 (aged 25)	(Russia) Avangard Omsk
44	D	Egor Yakovlev (A)	1.80 m (5 ft 11 in)	86 kg (190 lb)	17 September 1991 (aged 30)	(Russia) Metallurg Magnitogorsk
55	F	Vladimir Tkachyov	1.83 m (6 ft 0 in)	95 kg (209 lb)	5 October 1993 (aged 28)	(Russia) Traktor Chelyabinsk
57	D	Alexander Nikishin	1.93 m (6 ft 4 in)	98 kg (216 lb)	2 October 2001 (aged 20)	(Russia) HC Spartak Moscow
58	F	Anton Slepyshev	1.88 m (6 ft 2 in)	99 kg (218 lb)	13 May 1994 (aged 27)	(Russia) HC CSKA Moscow
72	D	Artyom Minulin	1.90 m (6 ft 3 in)	87 kg (192 lb)	1 October 1998 (aged 23)	(Russia) Metallurg Magnitogorsk
76	F	Andrei Chibisov	1.92 m (6 ft 4 in)	103 kg (227 lb)	26 February 1993 (aged 28)	(Russia) Metallurg Magnitogorsk
81	F	Arseni Gritsyuk	1.82 m (6 ft 0 in)	84 kg (185 lb)	15 March 2001 (aged 20)	(Russia) Avangard Omsk
82	G	Timur Bilyalov	1.79 m (5 ft 10 in)	79 kg (174 lb)	28 March 1995 (aged 26)	(Russia) Ak Bars Kazan
87	F	Vadim Shipachyov (C)	1.84 m (6 ft 0 in)	86 kg (190 lb)	12 March 1987 (aged 34)	(Russia) HC Dynamo Moscow
89	D	Nikita Nesterov	1.83 m (6 ft 0 in)	91 kg (201 lb)	28 March 1993 (aged 28)	(Russia) HC CSKA Moscow
94	F	Kirill Semyonov	1.85 m (6 ft 1 in)	80 kg (180 lb)	27 October 1994 (aged 27)	(Russia) Avangard Omsk
97	F	Nikita Gusev	1.75 m (5 ft 9 in)	74 kg (163 lb)	8 July 1992 (aged 29)	(Russia) SKA Saint Petersburg

Group play

Pos	Team	Pld	W	OTW	OTL	L	GF	GA	GD	Pts	Qualification
1	ROC	3	2	0	1	0	8	6	+2	7	Quarterfinals
2	Denmark	3	2	0	0	1	7	6	+1	6	Playoffs
3	Czech Republic	3	0	2	0	1	9	8	+1	4	Playoffs
4	Switzerland	3	0	0	1	2	4	8	−4	1	Playoffs

Source: IIHF

February 9, 2022; 16:40 v	ROC	1–0 (1–0, 0–0, 0–0)	Switzerland	Beijing National Indoor Stadium, Beijing; Attendance: 934

Game reference
Ivan Fedotov	Goalies	Reto Berra	Referees: (Germany) André Schrader (Belarus) Maxim Sidorenko; Linesmen: (United States) Brian Oliver (Czech Republic) Jiří Ondráček
Slepyshev (Semyonov) – 19:57 / 1–0			Referees: (Germany) André Schrader (Belarus) Maxim Sidorenko; Linesmen: (United States) Brian Oliver (Czech Republic) Jiří Ondráček
14 min	Penalties	10 min	Referees: (Germany) André Schrader (Belarus) Maxim Sidorenko; Linesmen: (United States) Brian Oliver (Czech Republic) Jiří Ondráček
30	Shots	33	Referees: (Germany) André Schrader (Belarus) Maxim Sidorenko; Linesmen: (United States) Brian Oliver (Czech Republic) Jiří Ondráček

February 11, 2022; 12:10 v	Denmark	0–2 (0–0, 0–1, 0–1)	ROC	Beijing National Indoor Stadium, Beijing; Attendance: 907

Game reference
Frederik Dichow	Goalies	Ivan Fedotov	Referees: (Canada) Michael Campbell (Czech Republic) Martin Fraňo; Linesmen: (United States) William Hancock (Sweden) Andreas Malmqvist
0–1 / 28:18 – Karnaukhov (Slepyshev, Voronkov); 0–2 / 59:54 – Semyonov (ENG)			Referees: (Canada) Michael Campbell (Czech Republic) Martin Fraňo; Linesmen: (United States) William Hancock (Sweden) Andreas Malmqvist
10 min	Penalties	2 min	Referees: (Canada) Michael Campbell (Czech Republic) Martin Fraňo; Linesmen: (United States) William Hancock (Sweden) Andreas Malmqvist
16	Shots	33	Referees: (Canada) Michael Campbell (Czech Republic) Martin Fraňo; Linesmen: (United States) William Hancock (Sweden) Andreas Malmqvist

February 12, 2022; 21:10 v	ROC	5–6 OT (1–1, 1–2, 3–2) (OT: 0–1)	Czech Republic	Beijing National Indoor Stadium, Beijing; Attendance: 921

Game reference

Ivan Fedotov
Goalies
Šimon Hrubec
Referees:
(Finland) Mikko Kaukokari
(Sweden) Mikael Nord
Linesmen:
(Sweden) Ludvig Lundgren
(Finland) Lauri Nikulainen

Tkachyov (Gusev, Nesterov) – 04:51	1–0
	1–1	12:37 – Kundrátek (Červenka, Stránský) (PP)
Nesterov (Gusev, Plotnikov) (PP) – 32:19	2–1
	2–2	38:41 – Krejčí (Červenka, Kundrátek) (PP)
	2–3	39:16 – Špaček (Šulák, Sobotka) (PP)
	2–4	43:14 – Klok (T. Zohorna, H. Zohorna)
Semyonov (Plotnikov, Andronov) – 43:50	3–4
Gritsyuk (Gusev, Tkachyov) – 46:43	4–4
Chibisov (Voynov, Shipachyov) – 48:22	5–4
	5–5	48:57 – Hyka (Sedlák, Krejčí)
	5–6	64:29 – Šulák (Krejčí) (PP)

33 min
Penalties
10 min
29
Shots
41

Quarterfinal

February 16, 2022; 14:00 v	ROC	3–1 (1–1, 1–0, 1–0)	Denmark	Wukesong Arena, Beijing; Attendance: 727

Game reference

Ivan Fedotov
Goalies
Sebastian Dahm
Referees:
(Canada) Michael Campbell
(Czech Republic) Martin Fraňo
Linesmen:
(Sweden) Andreas Malmqvist
(Czech Republic) Jiří Ondráček

Shipachyov (Gusev, Yakovlev) – 13:01	1–0
	1–1	22:57 – Nielsen (Bau Hansen, Lauridsen) (PP)
Nesterov (Gusev, Gritsyuk) – 34:36	2–1
Voynov (Shipachyov, Gritsyuk) (PP) – 55:45	3–1

4 min
Penalties
6 min
40
Shots
18

Semifinal

February 18, 2022; 21:10 v	ROC	2–1 GWS (0–0, 1–0, 0–1) (OT: 0–0) (SO: 1–0)	Sweden	Beijing National Indoor Stadium, Beijing; Attendance: 1,161

Game reference
Ivan Fedotov	Goalies	Lars Johansson	Referees: (United States) Andrew Bruggeman (Canada) Oliver Gouin; Linesmen: (Czech Republic) Daniel Hynek (Czech Republic) Jiří Ondráček
Slepyshev (Karnaukhov, Yakovlev) – 20:15 / 1–0; / 1–1 / 46:22 – Lander (Tömmernes, Pudas)			Referees: (United States) Andrew Bruggeman (Canada) Oliver Gouin; Linesmen: (Czech Republic) Daniel Hynek (Czech Republic) Jiří Ondráček
Slepyshev (miss); Grigorenko (miss); Gusev; Tkachyov (miss); Yakovlev; Gusev (miss); Gusev (miss); Gritsyuk	Shootout	(miss) Klingberg; Wallmark; Nordström; (miss) Tömmernes; (miss) Lander; (miss) Klingberg; (miss) Wallmark; (miss) Friberg	Referees: (United States) Andrew Bruggeman (Canada) Oliver Gouin; Linesmen: (Czech Republic) Daniel Hynek (Czech Republic) Jiří Ondráček
4 min	Penalties	4 min	Referees: (United States) Andrew Bruggeman (Canada) Oliver Gouin; Linesmen: (Czech Republic) Daniel Hynek (Czech Republic) Jiří Ondráček
41	Shots	35	Referees: (United States) Andrew Bruggeman (Canada) Oliver Gouin; Linesmen: (Czech Republic) Daniel Hynek (Czech Republic) Jiří Ondráček

Gold medal game

February 20, 2022; 12:10 v	Finland	2–1 (0–1, 1–0, 1–0)	ROC	Beijing National Indoor Stadium, Beijing; Attendance: 1,288

Game reference

Harri Säteri
Goalies
Ivan Fedotov
Referees:
(Sweden) Tobias Björk
(United States) Andrew Bruggeman
Linesmen:
(United States) William Hancock
(Canada) Dustin McCrank

	0–1	07:17 – Grigorenko (Nesterov, Gusev) (PP)
Pokka (Björninen, Ohtamaa) – 23:28	1–1
Björninen (Anttila, Ohtamaa) – 40:31	2–1

2 min
Penalties
6 min
31
Shots
17

=== Women's tournament ===
Russia women's national ice hockey team qualified by being ranked 4th in the 2020 IIHF World Rankings.

Team roster

A 23-player roster was announced on 24 January 2022. The roster submitted in the ROC's preliminary application on 2 February featured only nineteen players. Due to positive COVID-19 test results, previously named goaltender Diana Farkhutdinova, defencemen Angelina Goncharenko and Yekaterina Nikolayeva, and forwards Liudmila Belyakova and captain Olga Sosina were removed and reserve forward Polina Luchnikova was added to the roster. Goaltender Valeria Merkusheva and defenceman Maria Batalova were expected join the team in Beijing on 3 February. On 3 February, defenceman Yulia Smirnova and forward Landysh Falyakhova were registered and, on 5 February, Maria Batalova was registered and both Angelina Goncharenko and Olga Sosina returned to the official roster.

Head coach: Yevgeni Bobariko

No.	Pos.	Name	Height	Weight	Birthdate	Team
2	D	Angelina Goncharenko	1.78 m (5 ft 10 in)	73 kg (161 lb)	23 May 1994 (aged 27)	(Russia) SKIF Nizhny Novgorod
4	D	Yulia Smirnova	1.63 m (5 ft 4 in)	55 kg (121 lb)	8 May 1998 (aged 23)	(Russia) Dynamo-Neva St. Petersburg
10	F	Liudmila Belyakova	1.70 m (5 ft 7 in)	65 kg (143 lb)	12 August 1994 (aged 27)	(Russia) HC Tornado
11	D	Liana Ganeyeva	1.65 m (5 ft 5 in)	62 kg (137 lb)	20 December 1997 (aged 24)	(Russia) Dynamo-Neva St. Petersburg
12	D	Maria Pechnikova	1.78 m (5 ft 10 in)	60 kg (130 lb)	8 June 1992 (aged 29)	(Russia) Agidel Ufa
13	D	Nina Pirogova	1.73 m (5 ft 8 in)	60 kg (130 lb)	26 January 1999 (aged 23)	(Russia) HC Tornado
15	F	Valeria Pavlova	1.78 m (5 ft 10 in)	78 kg (172 lb)	15 April 1995 (aged 26)	(Russia) Biryusa Krasnoyarsk
17	F	Fanuza Kadirova	1.61 m (5 ft 3 in)	59 kg (130 lb)	6 April 1998 (aged 23)	(Russia) Dynamo-Neva St. Petersburg
18	F	Olga Sosina	1.63 m (5 ft 4 in)	76 kg (168 lb)	27 July 1992 (aged 29)	(Russia) Agidel Ufa
19	D	Yelena Provorova	1.65 m (5 ft 5 in)	63 kg (139 lb)	22 November 2001 (aged 20)	(Russia) SKIF Nizhny Novgorod
21	F	Polina Bolgareva	1.67 m (5 ft 6 in)	65 kg (143 lb)	6 February 1999 (aged 22)	(Russia) Dynamo-Neva St. Petersburg
22	D	Maria Batalova	1.73 m (5 ft 8 in)	65 kg (143 lb)	3 May 1996 (aged 25)	(Russia) Agidel Ufa
23	G	Daria Gredzen	1.76 m (5 ft 9 in)	68 kg (150 lb)	23 March 2004 (aged 17)	(Russia) Biryusa Krasnoyarsk
26	F	Yekaterina Dobrodeyeva	1.59 m (5 ft 3 in)	58 kg (128 lb)	10 December 1999 (aged 22)	(Russia) Biryusa Krasnoyarsk
27	F	Veronika Korzhakova	1.68 m (5 ft 6 in)	64 kg (141 lb)	9 June 2003 (aged 18)	(Russia) Agidel Ufa
29	F	Alexandra Vafina – A	1.64 m (5 ft 5 in)	57 kg (126 lb)	28 July 1990 (age 35)	(Russia) Dynamo-Neva St. Petersburg
30	G	Valeria Merkusheva	1.68 m (5 ft 6 in)	66 kg (146 lb)	20 September 1999 (age 26)	(Russia) SKIF Nizhny Novgorod
42	F	Oxana Bratisheva	1.65 m (5 ft 5 in)	54 kg (119 lb)	5 June 2000 (aged 21)	(Russia) SKIF Nizhny Novgorod
59	F	Yelena Dergachyova	1.59 m (5 ft 3 in)	55 kg (121 lb)	8 November 1995 (aged 26)	(Russia) HC Tornado
69	G	Maria Sorokina	1.66 m (5 ft 5 in)	65 kg (143 lb)	19 August 1995 (aged 26)	(Russia) Agidel Ufa
70	D	Anna Shibanova – A	1.63 m (5 ft 4 in)	63 kg (139 lb)	10 November 1994 (aged 27)	(Russia) Agidel Ufa
72	D	Anna Savonina	1.63 m (5 ft 4 in)	63 kg (139 lb)	5 December 2001 (aged 20)	(Russia) HC Tornado
73	F	Viktoria Kulishova	1.70 m (5 ft 7 in)	57 kg (126 lb)	12 August 1999 (aged 22)	(Russia) SKIF Nizhny Novgorod
76	D	Yekaterina Nikolayeva	1.66 m (5 ft 5 in)	69 kg (152 lb)	5 October 1995 (aged 26)	(Russia) HC St. Petersburg
79	F	Landysh Falyakhova	1.58 m (5 ft 2 in)	54 kg (119 lb)	31 August 1998 (aged 23)	(Russia) SKIF Nizhny Novgorod
87	F	Polina Luchnikova	1.67 m (5 ft 6 in)	68 kg (150 lb)	30 January 2002 (aged 20)	(Russia) Agidel Ufa
97	F	Anna Shokhina – C	1.68 m (5 ft 6 in)	67 kg (148 lb)	23 June 1997 (aged 24)	(Russia) HC Tornado

Group play

Pos	Team	Pld	W	OTW	OTL	L	GF	GA	GD	Pts	Qualification
1	Canada	4	4	0	0	0	33	5	+28	12	Quarterfinals
2	United States	4	3	0	0	1	20	6	+14	9	Quarterfinals
3	Finland	4	1	0	0	3	10	19	−9	3 (Note: Finland 3 Pts, +4 GD; ROC 3 Pts, −2 GD; Switzerland 3 Pts, −2 GD. ROC defeated Switzerland 5–2.)	Quarterfinals
4	ROC	4	1	0	0	3	6	18	−12	3	Quarterfinals
5	Switzerland	4	1	0	0	3	6	27	−21	3	Quarterfinals

Source: IIHF
Rules for classification: Tiebreakers
Notes:

4 February 2022; 12:10 v	ROC	5–2 (2–1, 2–1, 1–0)	Switzerland	Beijing National Indoor Stadium, Beijing

Game reference

Maria Sorokina
Goalies
Andrea Brändli
Referees:
(Canada) Cianna Lieffers
(Canada) Elizabeth Mantha
Linesmen:
(United States) Kendall Hanley
(United States) Jacqueline Spresser

Dobrodeyeva (Vafina, Pavlova) – 05:54	1–0
	1–1	17:16 – Stalder (Christen, Müller) (PP)
Bolgareva (Kadirova) – 17:29	2–1
	2–2	26:57 – Müller (Ryhner) (SH)
Shibanova (Pechnikova, Bratisheva) – 30:30	3–2
Bolgareva (Kadirova) – 37:07	4–2
Bolgareva (Vafina) (SH) – 41:39	5–2

10 min
Penalties
6 min
31
Shots
30

5 February 2022; 21:10 v	United States	5–0 (1–0, 1–0, 3–0)	ROC	Wukesong Arena, Beijing; Attendance: 581

Game reference

Nicole Hensley
Goalies
Maria Sorokina
Daria Gredzen
Referees:
(Germany) Tijana Haack
(Finland) Anniina Nurmi
Linesmen:
(Sweden) Anna Hammar
(Finland) Jenni Heikkinen

Harmon (Knight, Brandt) – 12:29	1–0
Knight (Harmon, Coyne Schofield) – 28:51	2–0
Zumwinkle (Cameranesi, Bozek) – 43:57	3–0
Compher (Murphy, Scamurra) – 46:15	4–0
Carpenter (Kessel, Harmon) – 48:44	5–0

6 min
Penalties
14 min
62
Shots
12

7 February 2022; 13:15 v	ROC	1–6 (0–2, 1–2, 0–2)	Canada	Wukesong Arena, Beijing; Attendance: 545

Game reference

Daria Gredzen
Maria Sorokina
Goalies
Emerance Maschmeyer
Referees:
(Russia) Daria Ermak
(United States) Chelsea Rapin
Linesmen:
(Sweden) Veronica Lovensnö
(Finland) Linnea Sainio

	0–1	02:09 – Nurse
	0–2	02:29 – Fillier (Fast, Rattray)
	0–3	27:45 – Rattray (Spooner, Nurse) (PP)
	0–4	30:29 – Ambrose (Johnston, Stacey)
Shokhina (Vafina) – 37:21	1–4
	1–5	40:39 – Johnston (Jenner, Poulin) (PP)
	1–6	45:50 – Poulin (Jenner, Ambrose) (PP)

14 min
Penalties
8 min
12
Shots
49

8 February 2022; 21:10 v	Finland	5–0 (2–0, 3–0, 0–0)	ROC	Beijing National Indoor Stadium, Beijing; Attendance: 797

Game reference

Anni Keisala
Goalies
Maria Sorokina
Valeria Merkusheva
Referees:
(United States) Kelly Cooke
(Switzerland) Anna Wiegand
Linesmen:
(Canada) Alex Clarke
(United States) Sara Strong

Rantala (Niskanen) – 09:06	1–0
Karvinen (Nieminen, Tulus) (PP) – 18:18	2–0
Nylund (Vanhanen, Rantala) – 27:09	3–0
Tuominen (Laitinen) (PP) – 30:37	4–0
Tapani (Hiirikoski, Tulus) (PP) – 31:06	5–0

6 min
Penalties
14 min
30
Shots
19

Quarterfinal

12 February 2022; 12:10 v	ROC	2–4 (0–0, 1–1, 1–3)	Switzerland	Wukesong Arena, Beijing; Attendance: 670

Game reference

Valeria Merkusheva
Goalies
Andrea Brändli
Referees:
(United States) Kelly Cooke
(United States) Chelsea Rapin
Linesmen:
(Finland) Jenni Heikkinen
(United States) Sara Strong

	0–1	34:31 – Stänz (Müller, Stalder)
Savonina (Shokhina, Korzhakova) – 37:38	1–1
	1–2	47:31 – Rüegg (Moy, Vallario)
Kadirova (Luchnikova, Provorova) – 56:53	2–2
	2–3	57:23 – Müller (Stalder)
	2–4	59:58 – Müller (SH, ENG)

4 min
Penalties
6 min
24
Shots
36

== Luge ==
Based on their rankings in the 2021–22 Luge World Cup, Russian Olympic Committee qualified ten athletes and a relay team. The team consists of three athletes each in the individual events and two doubles sleds. Russian Luge Federation announced the 7 men and 3 women participating on 10 January 2022.

Men

Athlete	Event	Run 1		Run 2		Run 3		Run 4		Total	
Athlete	Event	Time	Rank	Time	Rank	Time	Rank	Time	Rank	Time	Rank
Aleksandr Gorbatcevich	Singles	58.139	16	58.339	13	58.080	14	58.043	15	3:52.601	14
Semen Pavlichenko	Singles	57.786	11	58.115	10	57.955	13	57.793	11	3:51.649	10
Roman Repilov	Singles	57.594	8	58.679	16	57.714	9	57.647	8	3:51.634	9
Andrey Bogdanov; Yuri Prokhorov	Doubles	59.376	11	59.132	11	—N/a				1:58.508	10
Alexander Denisyev; Vladislav Antonov	Doubles	59.040	9	58.953	6	—N/a				1:57.993	8

Women

Athlete	Event	Run 1		Run 2		Run 3		Run 4		Total	
Athlete	Event	Time	Rank	Time	Rank	Time	Rank	Time	Rank	Time	Rank
Victoria Demchenko	Singles	58.869	7	1:03.466	33	58.838	9	Did not advance		3:01.173	28
Tatiana Ivanova	Singles	58.733	5	58.683	4	58.461	3	58.630	5	3:54.507	3rd place, bronze medalist(s)
Ekaterina Katnikova	Singles	Did not finish									

Mixed team relay

Athlete	Event	Run 1		Run 2		Run 3		Total	
Athlete	Event	Time	Rank	Time	Rank	Time	Rank	Time	Rank
Tatiana Ivanova; Roman Repilov; Alexander Denisyev / Vladislav Antonov	Team relay	1:00.147	3	1:01.757	4	1:02.763	6	3:04.667	4

== Nordic combined ==
Russian Ski Jumping and Nordic Combined Federation announced the 3 athletes participating on 17 January 2022.

Athlete	Event	Ski jumping			Cross-country		Total	
Athlete	Event	Distance	Points	Rank	Time	Rank	Time	Rank
Viacheslav Barkov	Normal hill/10 km	78.0	61.6	41	26:08.2	28	30:54.2	38
Viacheslav Barkov	Large hill/10 km	103.0	53.3	44	27:10.9	24	32:56.9	41
Artem Galunin	Normal hill/10 km	77.0	66.8	39	27:13.8	36	31:38.8	39
Artem Galunin	Large hill/10 km	108.5	58.0	42	27:55.2	37	33:22.2	42
Samir Mastiev	Normal hill/10 km	72.0	47.8	44	26:18.0	29	31:59.0	40
Samir Mastiev	Large hill/10 km	86.5	20.4	48	28:09.4	40	36:07.4	46

== Short track speed skating ==
Russian athletes have qualified in all three relays, qualifying four men and five women, then claimed one additional male quote during reallocation. Russian Skating Union announced the 4 men and 5 women participating on 12 December 2021 and then announced fifth man on 17 January 2022.

Men

Athlete	Event	Heat		Quarterfinal		Semifinal		Final	Rank
Athlete	Event	Time	Rank	Time	Rank	Time	Rank	Time	Rank
Denis Ayrapetyan	1000 m	PEN		Did not advance					
Denis Ayrapetyan	1500 m	—N/a		2:09.776	3 Q	2:10.773	3 FB	2:18.076	12
Semion Elistratov	1000 m	1:24.077	3	Did not advance					21
Semion Elistratov	1500 m	—N/a		2:15.094	2 Q	2:13.229	2 FA	2:09.267	3rd place, bronze medalist(s)
Daniil Eybog	1500 m	—N/a		2:16.975	4	Did not advance			24
Konstantin Ivliev	500 m	40.272	1 Q	40.351	1 Q	40.655	1 FA	40.431	2nd place, silver medalist(s)
Pavel Sitnikov	500 m	40.591	2 Q	40.643	2 Q	40.848	3 FB	41.217	7
Denis Ayrapetyan; Semion Elistratov; Konstantin Ivliev; Pavel Sitnikov	5000 m relay	—N/a				6:37.925	2 FA	6:43.440	4

Women

Athlete	Event	Heat		Quarterfinal		Semifinal		Final	Rank
Athlete	Event	Time	Rank	Time	Rank	Time	Rank	Time	Rank
Ekaterina Efremenkova	500 m	43.140	4	Did not advance					25
Ekaterina Efremenkova	1000 m	1:29.734	2 Q	1:29.434	3	Did not advance			12
Ekaterina Efremenkova	1500 m	—N/a		DNF	6	Did not advance			33
Sofia Prosvirnova	500 m	43.331	2 Q	PEN		Did not advance			18
Sofia Prosvirnova	1000 m	PEN		Did not advance					
Sofia Prosvirnova	1500 m	—N/a		2:19.432	3 Q	2:22.546	5	Did not advance	15
Elena Seregina	500 m	43.605	2 Q	43.712	2 Q	42.685	3 FB	42.972	6
Anna Vostrikova	1000 m	1:28.290	3 q	1:30.021	4	Did not advance			16
Anna Vostrikova	1500 m	—N/a		2:21.113	2 Q	2:20.705	7	Did not advance	19
Ekaterina Efremenkova; Sofia Prosvirnova; Elena Seregina; Anna Vostrikova	3000 m relay	—N/a				4:06.064	3 FB	PEN	7

Mixed

Athlete	Event	Quarterfinal		Semifinal		Final	Rank
Athlete	Event	Time	Rank	Time	Rank	Time	Rank
Ekaterina Efremenkova; Semion Elistratov; Konstantin Ivliev; Sofia Prosvirnova; Elena Seregina	2000 m relay	2:38.445	2 Q	PEN		Did not advance	7

Qualification legend: ADV – Advanced due to being impeded by another skater; FA – Qualify to medal round; FB – Qualify to consolation round; AA – Advance to medal round due to being impeded by another skater

== Skeleton ==
Based on the world rankings, Russian Olympic Committee qualified 6 sleds.

On 17 January 2022, Bobsleigh Federation of Russia announced the 6 competing athletes. On 31 January 2022 Vladislav Semenov and Nikita Tregubov, who is the 2018 silver medalist, were replaced with Daniil Romanov and Evgeniy Rukosuev respectively due to positive COVID-19 tests.

Athlete	Event	Run 1		Run 2		Run 3		Run 4		Total	
Athlete	Event	Time	Rank	Time	Rank	Time	Rank	Time	Rank	Time	Rank
Daniil Romanov	Men's	1:02.47	24	1:02.60	23	1:02.20	23	Did not advance		3:07.27	23
Evgeniy Rukosuev	Men's	1:00.48	4	1:00.72	6	1:00.56	7	1:00.64	8	4:02.40	6
Aleksandr Tretyakov	Men's	1:00.36	2	1:00.84	8	1:00.37	3	1:00.42	4	4:01.99	4
Yulia Kanakina	Women's	1:02.56	11	1:02.95	13	1:02.24	9	1:02.34	10	4:10.09	11
Elena Nikitina	Women's	1:02.92	18	1:03.07	17	1:02.51	15	1:02.37	12	4:10.87	16
Alina Tararychenkova	Women's	1:02.74	16	1:02.86	11	1:02.43	13	1:02.79	17	4:10.82	15

== Ski jumping ==
Russian Ski Jumping and Nordic Combined Federation announced 4 men and 4 women participating on 17 January 2022. Fifth man was announced on 25 January 2012.

Men

Athlete	Event	Qualification			First round			Final			Total	
Athlete	Event	Distance	Points	Rank	Distance	Points	Rank	Distance	Points	Rank	Points	Rank
Evgenii Klimov	Normal hill	95.5	99.5	14 Q	104.0	135.0	4 Q	100.0	126.5	7	261.5	5
Evgenii Klimov	Large hill	130.0	119.5	13 Q	133.0	126.8	22 Q	132.5	128.7	21	255.5	19
Mikhail Nazarov	Normal hill	86.5	81.4	31 Q	97.0	181.1	32	Did not advance				
Mikhail Nazarov	Large hill	124.5	112.6	21 Q	127.5	118.4	34	Did not advance				
Danil Sadreev	Normal hill	92.5	97.0	18 Q	107.5	134.1	7 Q	98.0	125.3	11	259.4	8
Danil Sadreev	Large hill	136.5	127.3	5 Q	134.0	130.2	14 Q	133.5	129.5	19	259.7	16
Roman Trofimov	Normal hill	86.0	80.0	33 Q	97.5	120.8	29 Q	98.0	123.9	14	244.7	23
Roman Trofimov	Large hill	123.5	116.0	16 Q	133.0	128.8	16 Q	130.5	125.1	26	253.9	23
Danil Sadreev; Roman Trofimov; Mikhail Nazarov; Evgenii Klimov	Large hill team	—N/a			493.5	410.6	7 Q	476.5	395.9	8	806.5	7

Women

Athlete	Event	First round			Final			Total	
Athlete	Event	Distance	Points	Rank	Distance	Points	Rank	Points	Rank
Irina Avvakumova	Normal hill	95.0	99.6	9 Q	89.5	96.7	8	196.3	7
Aleksandra Kustova	Normal hill	88.0	81.4	20 Q	85.0	90.0	13	171.4	17
Irma Makhinia	Normal hill	90.0	85.4	17 Q	90.0	95.5	9	180.9	10
Sofia Tikhonova	Normal hill	78.5	70.3	27 Q	83.0	76.5	23	46.8	26

Mixed

Athlete	Event	First round			Final			Total	
Athlete	Event	Distance	Points	Rank	Distance	Points	Rank	Points	Rank
Irma Makhinia; Danil Sadreev; Irina Avvakumova; Evgenii Klimov	Mixed team	378.0	448.8	3 Q	376.5	441.5	4	890.3	2nd place, silver medalist(s)

== Snowboarding ==
Russian Snowboarding Federation announced the 6 men and 8 women participating on 20 January 2022.

Big air

Athlete	Event	Qualification					Final				
Athlete	Event	Run 1	Run 2	Run 3	Total	Rank	Run 1	Run 2	Run 3	Total	Rank
Vlad Khadarin	Men's big air	67.00	37.25	~~30.00~~	104.25	19	Did not advance				
Ekaterina Kosova	Women's big air	17.00	46.00	~~10.50~~	63.00	26	Did not advance				

Parallel

Athlete	Event	Qualification		Round of 16	Quarterfinal	Semifinal	Final	Rank
Athlete	Event	Time	Rank	Opposition Time	Opposition Time	Opposition Time	Opposition Time	Rank
Dmitriy Karlagachev	Men's giant slalom	Did not start						
Dmitry Loginov	Men's giant slalom	1:21.69	8 Q	Wild (ROC); L DNF	Did not advance			10
Andrey Sobolev	Men's giant slalom	1:22.87	19	Did not advance				19
Vic Wild	Men's giant slalom	1:22.06	9 Q	Loginov (ROC); W	Lee (KOR); W	Mastnak (SLO); L +0.48	Fischnaller (ITA); W	3rd place, bronze medalist(s)
Milena Bykova	Women's giant slalom	DSQ		Did not advance				30
Sofia Nadyrshina	Women's giant slalom	1:27.22	4 Q	Dekker (NED); L +0.03	Did not advance			10
Polina Smolentseva	Women's giant slalom	1:28.16	9 Q	Król (POL); L +0.16	Did not advance			11
Natalia Soboleva	Women's giant slalom	1:29.94	20	Did not advance				20

Slopestyle

Athlete	Event	Qualification				Final				
Athlete	Event	Run 1	Run 2	Best	Rank	Run 1	Run 2	Run 3	Best	Rank
Vlad Khadarin	Men's slopestyle	64.73	21.15	64.73	15	Did not advance				

Snowboard cross

Athlete	Event	Seeding		1/8 final	Quarterfinal	Semifinal	Final	Rank
Athlete	Event	Time	Rank	Position	Position	Position	Position	Rank
Daniil Donskikh	Men's	1:19.36	25	3	Did not advance			24
Ekaterina Lokteva-Zagorskaia	Women's	1:26.22	27	4	Did not advance			29
Aleksandra Parshina	Women's	1:24.76	19	2 Q	4	Did not advance		14
Kristina Paul	Women's	1:24.76	10	3	Did not advance			17
Mariya Vasiltsova	Women's	1:25.90	25	3	Did not advance			23
Daniil Donskikh; Kristina Paul	Mixed team	—N/a			1 Q	4 FB	4	8

Qualification legend: FA – Qualify to medal round; FB – Qualify to consolation round

== Speed skating ==
Russian Olympic Committee earned the following quotas at the conclusion of the four World Cup's used for qualification — 8 men and 8 women, including both teams in the men's and women's team pursuit events. Russian Skating Union announced the participants on 17 January 2022.

Distance
Men

Athlete	Event	Race	
Athlete	Event	Time	Rank
Daniil Aldoshkin	1500 m	1:46.33	14
Artem Arefyev	500 m	34.56	7
Pavel Kulizhnikov	1000 m	1:08.87	11
Ruslan Murashov	500 m	34.63	10
Viktor Mushtakov	500 m	34.60	9
Viktor Mushtakov	1000 m	1:08.74	8
Aleksandr Rumyantsev	5000 m	6.15.02	6
Aleksandr Rumyantsev	10000 m	12:51.33	5
Sergey Trofimov	1500 m	1:45.32	8
Sergey Trofimov	5000 m	6:10.27	4
Ruslan Zakharov	1500 m	1:46.46	15
Ruslan Zakharov	5000 m	6:21.00	14

Women

Athlete	Event	Race	
Athlete	Event	Time	Rank
Olga Fatkulina	500 m	37.76	10
Olga Fatkulina	1000 m	1:15.87	13
Angelina Golikova	500 m	37.21	3rd place, bronze medalist(s)
Angelina Golikova	1000 m	1:14.71	4
Elizaveta Golubeva	1500 m	1:55.30	7
Daria Kachanova	500 m	37.65	8
Daria Kachanova	1000 m	1:15.649	9
Evgeniia Lalenkova	1500 m	1:55.74	9
Evgeniia Lalenkova	3000 m	4:03.42	10
Elena Sokhryakova	1500 m	1:59.58	22
Natalya Voronina	3000 m	4:03.84	11
Natalya Voronina	5000 m	6:56.99	6

Mass start

Athlete	Event	Semifinal			Final		Rank
Athlete	Event	Points	Time	Rank	Points	Time	Rank
Daniil Aldoshkin	Men's mass start	6	7:56.83	5 Q	6	7:47.59	5
Ruslan Zakharov	Men's mass start	DNF		15	Did not advance		29
Elizaveta Golubeva	Women's mass start	1	8:53.99	9 ADV	DNF		15
Elena Sokhryakova	Women's mass start	2	8:45.00	10	Did not advance		19

Team pursuit

Athlete	Event	Quarterfinal		Semifinal	Final	Rank
Athlete	Event	Time	Rank	Opposition Time	Opposition Time	Rank
Daniil Aldoshkin; Sergey Trofimov; Ruslan Zakharov	Men's team pursuit	3:38.67	3 Q	United States; W 3:36.62 FA	Norway; L 3:40.46	2nd place, silver medalist(s)
Elizaveta Golubeva; Evgeniia Lalenkova; Natalya Voronina	Women's team pursuit	2:57.66	4 Q	Japan; L 3:05.92 FB	Netherlands; L 2:58.66	4

== See also ==
- Russian Olympic Committee athletes at the 2020 Summer Olympics
