= Nikita Nesterov =

Russian ice hockey player (born 1993)

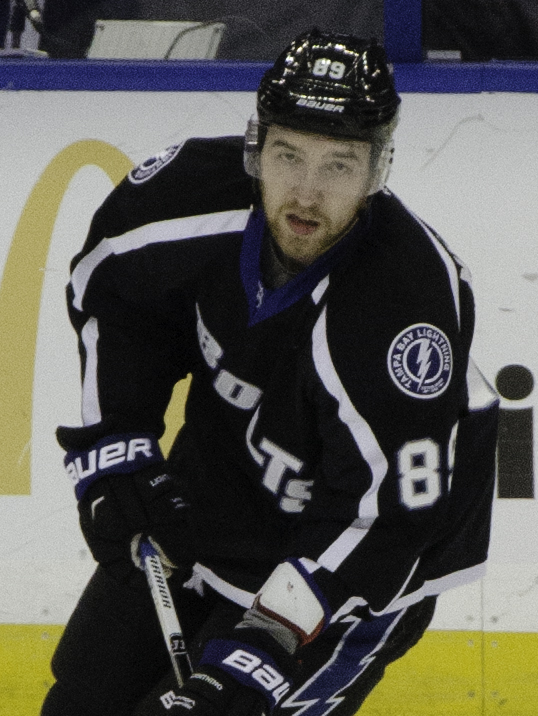
- Nesterov with the Tampa Bay Lightning in April 2015
- Born: 28 March 1993 (age 33) Chelyabinsk, Russia
- Height: 6 ft 0 in (183 cm)
- Weight: 183 lb (83 kg; 13 st 1 lb)
- Position: Defence
- Shoots: Left
- KHL team Former teams: CSKA Moscow; Traktor Chelyabinsk; Tampa Bay Lightning; Montreal Canadiens; Calgary Flames
- National team: Russia
- NHL draft: 148th overall, 2011; Tampa Bay Lightning
- Playing career: 2011–present

Nikita Danilovich Nesterov (Russian: Никита Данилович Нестеров; born 28 March 1993) is a Russian professional ice hockey defenceman for HC CSKA Moscow of the Kontinental Hockey League (KHL). He was selected in the fifth round, 148th overall, by the Tampa Bay Lightning of the National Hockey League (NHL) in the 2011 NHL entry draft. Nesterov has also previously played for the Montreal Canadiens and Calgary Flames.

== Playing career ==
=== Junior ===
Nesterov was selected by the Tampa Bay Lightning in the fifth round, 148th overall, of the 2011 NHL entry draft. He was also drafted by the Kontinental Hockey League (KHL)'s Traktor Chelyabinsk, who selected him in the first round, 22nd overall, of the 2010 KHL Junior Draft. He opted then to play two seasons with Chelyabinsk in the KHL.

On 30 April 2013, Nesterov was signed to a three-year, entry-level contract by the NHL's Lightning.

=== Professional ===
On 31 December 2014, Tampa Bay recalled Nesterov from the Syracuse Crunch, the team's American Hockey League (AHL) affiliate. He had played in 32 games with the Crunch during the 2014–15 season, recording three goals and 14 points with a +4 plus-minus rating and 26 penalty minutes. Before his call-up, Nesterov has played in 86 career AHL games, all with the Crunch over the past two seasons. He has seven goals and 30 points with 65 penalty minutes.

On 31 December 2014, the same day of his call-up, Nesterov made his NHL debut in a 5–1 Lightning victory over the Buffalo Sabres. He was a +1 and logged over 15 minutes of ice time during the game. On 16 April 2015, Nesterov played in his first career NHL playoff game recording his first playoff goal and point. On 18 April 2015, Nestrov recorded his first NHL playoff assist in a Tampa Bay Lightning 5-1 win over the Detroit Red Wings.

On 16 October 2015, the National Hockey League announced that it was suspending Nesterov for two games without pay for boarding Dallas Stars forward Curtis McKenzie. Nesterov was given a five-minute penalty and a game misconduct for checking McKenzie from behind for the incident that led to his suspension. As a result of the suspension, Nesterov forfeited $7,983.88 in pay.

On 26 September 2016, the Lightning announced the re-signing of Nesterov to a one-year contract worth $725,000. Nesterov appeared in 57 games the past season, recording three goals and nine points. He set career highs for games played, goals, assists, and points. He also appeared in nine 2016 Stanley Cup Playoff games, recording one assist and nine penalty minutes. Nesterov appeared in 84 career NHL games over two seasons with the Lightning, recording five goals and 16 points. Nesterov also appeared in 26 playoff games, recording a goal and seven points.

On 26 January 2017, the Lightning traded Nesterov to the Montreal Canadiens in exchange for Jonathan Racine and a 6th-round pick in the 2017 NHL entry draft.

Rumors were started about Nesterov's return to the KHL began when Traktor Chelyabinsk placed his name on the roster on their website, his former team, which is based in Nesterov's hometown. On 6 July 2017, Nesterov's agent posted a tweet stating that Nesterov had decided that he was going to return to Russia to play in the KHL. The following day it was announced that Nesterov agreed to a three-year contract with a KHL powerhouse club, CSKA Moscow.

At the conclusion of his three-year contract with CSKA, Nesterov as a free agent, returned to the NHL and signed a one-year, $700,000 contract with Canadian club, the Calgary Flames, on 23 October 2020. In his return to the NHL after three years, Nesterov made 38 appearances in the pandemic delayed 2020–21 season, registering just four assists from the blueline as the club missed the post-season.

As a free agent, Nesterov opted to return to his previous club HC CSKA Moscow of the KHL, agreeing to a one-year contract on 20 July 2021.

== International play ==
Medal record

Ice hockey

Representing Olympic Athletes from Russia

Olympic Games
Gold medal – first place	2018 Pyeongchang	

Representing ROC

Olympic Games
Silver medal – second place	2022 Beijing	

Representing Russia

World Championships
Bronze medal – third place	2019 Slovakia	

World Junior Championships
Silver medal – second place	2012 Canada	
Bronze medal – third place	2013 Ufa	

IIHF World U18 Championships
Bronze medal – third place	2011 Germany	

Nesterov has represented Russia in the World Junior Ice Hockey Championships and the World Ice Hockey Championships. On 18 July 2016, Nesterov was added to team Russia's 2016 World Cup of Hockey roster as a replacement for Slava Voynov. He is a member of the Olympic Athletes from Russia team at the 2018 Winter Olympics, this time together with Voynov.

On 23 January 2022, Nesterov was named to the roster to represent Russian Olympic Committee athletes at the 2022 Winter Olympics.

== Personal life ==
He has a son, Kirill Nesterov, the namesake of his godfather, Kirill Kaprizov, who spent time with the elder Nesterov in the KHL.

== Career statistics ==
=== Regular season and playoffs ===
			Regular season					Playoffs
Season	Team	League	GP	G	A	Pts	PIM	GP	G	A	Pts	PIM
2009–10	Belye Medvedi	MHL	9	5	2	7	8	4	0	0	0	6
2010–11	Belye Medvedi	MHL	46	5	14	19	72	5	0	0	0	6
2011–12	Belye Medvedi	MHL	41	11	20	31	66	—	—	—	—	—
2011–12	Traktor Chelyabinsk	KHL	10	0	1	1	4	—	—	—	—	—
2012–13	Traktor Chelyabinsk	KHL	35	0	1	1	14	19	0	4	4	6
2012–13	Belye Medvedi	MHL	2	0	1	1	2	4	2	1	3	0
2013–14	Syracuse Crunch	AHL	54	4	12	16	39	—	—	—	—	—
2014–15	Syracuse Crunch	AHL	32	3	11	14	26	—	—	—	—	—
2014–15	Tampa Bay Lightning	NHL	27	2	5	7	16	17	1	5	6	8
2015–16	Syracuse Crunch	AHL	10	1	3	4	4	—	—	—	—	—
2015–16	Tampa Bay Lightning	NHL	57	3	6	9	41	9	0	1	1	9
2016–17	Tampa Bay Lightning	NHL	35	3	9	12	20	—	—	—	—	—
2016–17	Montreal Canadiens	NHL	13	1	4	5	4	2	0	0	0	0
2017–18	CSKA Moscow	KHL	42	3	16	19	41	21	1	4	5	14
2018–19	CSKA Moscow	KHL	41	4	14	18	20	20	2	9	11	4
2019–20	CSKA Moscow	KHL	53	7	16	23	24	4	0	3	3	0
2020–21	Calgary Flames	NHL	38	0	4	4	20	—	—	—	—	—
2021–22	CSKA Moscow	KHL	41	5	28	33	26	22	3	8	11	6
2022–23	CSKA Moscow	KHL	64	11	29	40	23	27	2	16	18	18
2023–24	CSKA Moscow	KHL	59	11	25	36	36	5	2	2	4	2
2024–25	CSKA Moscow	KHL	62	8	27	35	20	6	0	2	2	2
2025–26	CSKA Moscow	KHL	64	3	15	18	8	10	1	4	5	6
KHL totals			471	52	171	223	216	137	11	52	63	58
NHL totals			170	9	28	37	101	28	1	6	7	17

=== International ===
Year	Team	Event	Result	GP	G	A	Pts	PIM
2010	Russia	WJC18	4th	7	2	0	2	29
2011	Russia	WJC18	3rd place, bronze medalist(s)	7	2	2	4	29
2012	Russia	WJC	2nd place, silver medalist(s)	7	2	3	5	6
2013	Russia	WJC	3rd place, bronze medalist(s)	7	0	4	4	2
2016	Russia	WCH	4th	1	0	0	0	0
2018	OAR	OG	1st place, gold medalist(s)	6	1	0	1	2
2018	Russia	WC	6th	8	2	1	3	2
2019	Russia	WC	3rd place, bronze medalist(s)	9	0	1	1	4
2021	ROC	WC	5th	5	2	2	4	6
2022	ROC	OG	2nd place, silver medalist(s)	6	2	2	4	0
Junior totals				28	6	9	15	66
Senior totals				35	7	6	13	14

== Awards and honors ==
Award	Year
MHL
All-Star Game	2012
AHL
All-Star Game	2015
KHL
All-Star Game	2018, 2019
Gagarin Cup (CSKA Moscow)	2019, 2022, 2023
