= Vladimir Tkachyov (ice hockey, born 1993) =

Russian ice hockey player (born 1993)

- Born: 5 October 1993 (age 33) Dnipropetrovsk, Ukraine
- Height: 6 ft 0 in (183 cm)
- Weight: 209 lb (95 kg; 14 st 13 lb)
- Position: Centre
- Shoots: Left
- KHL team Former teams: Torpedo Nizhny Novgorod; Ak Bars Kazan; Lokomotiv Yaroslavl; Traktor Chelyabinsk; Sibir Novosibirsk
- National team: Russia
- Playing career: 2012–present

Vladimir Alexandrovich Tkachyov (Russian: Владимир Александрович Ткачёв; Ukrainian: Володимир Олександрович Ткачов, romanized: Volodymyr Oleksandrovych Tkachov; born 5 October 1993) is a Russian professional ice hockey forward for Torpedo Nizhny Novgorod of the Kontinental Hockey League (KHL).

== Playing career ==
Tkachyov made his KHL debut playing with Ak Bars Kazan during the 2012–13 KHL season. After posting career bests with 15 goals and 32 points with Kazan in the 2016–17 season, Tkachyov warded off NHL interest in agreeing to a new two-year contract extension to continue with the club on May 3, 2017.

Following his second season with Lokomotiv Yaroslavl in 2020–21, having served as team captain and collected 10 goals and 28 points through 53 regular season games, Tkachyov left the club as a free agent.

On 3 May 2021, Tkachyov was signed to a two-year contract with his third KHL club, Traktor Chelyabinsk.

Tkachyov played four seasons in Chelyabinsk, leaving at the conclusion of his contract after a Gagarin Cup final defeat to Lokomotiv Yaroslavl in the 2025–26 season to sign a two-year deal with HC Sibir Novosibirsk on 6 June 2025. He was traded on 25 November to Torpedo Nizhny Novgorod in exchange for Mikhail Abramov, Anton Kosolapov, and cash.

== International play ==
Medal record

Representing ROC

Olympic Games
Silver medal – second place	2022 Beijing	

Representing Russia

Ice hockey

World Championships
Bronze medal – third place	2017 Germany/France	

World Junior Championships
Bronze medal – third place	2013 Russia	

IIHF World U18 Championship
Bronze medal – third place	2011 Germany	

Tkachyov originally was selected as a reserve player for the 2022 Olympics, however, on 26 January 2022, when Artem Anisimov was tested positive with COVID-19, Tkachyov was advanced to the selection.

== Career statistics ==
=== Regular season and playoffs ===
			Regular season					Playoffs
Season	Team	League	GP	G	A	Pts	PIM	GP	G	A	Pts	PIM
2009–10	Bars Kazan	MHL	4	0	0	0	0	—	—	—	—	—
2010–11	Bars Kazan	MHL	39	9	9	18	12	3	1	0	1	2
2011–12	Bars Kazan	MHL	55	25	17	42	18	5	1	1	2	0
2012–13	Bars Kazan	MHL	27	19	24	43	14	4	1	1	2	4
2012–13	Ak Bars Kazan	KHL	5	0	0	0	0	—	—	—	—	—
2012–13	Neftyanik Almetyevsk	VHL	7	0	4	4	2	4	0	0	0	2
2013–14	Bars Kazan	MHL	2	3	2	5	0	8	2	5	7	2
2013–14	Ak Bars Kazan	KHL	52	1	8	9	6	6	0	0	0	0
2014–15	Bars Kazan	MHL	7	3	1	4	2	—	—	—	—	—
2014–15	Ak Bars Kazan	KHL	30	6	3	9	6	3	0	0	0	0
2015–16	Ak Bars Kazan	KHL	48	12	8	20	8	7	5	4	9	0
2016–17	Ak Bars Kazan	KHL	58	15	17	32	6	15	2	9	11	2
2017–18	Ak Bars Kazan	KHL	53	22	14	36	28	19	3	6	9	0
2018–19	Ak Bars Kazan	KHL	58	11	11	22	10	4	0	0	0	2
2019–20	Ak Bars Kazan	KHL	25	4	7	11	2	—	—	—	—	—
2019–20	Lokomotiv Yaroslavl	KHL	21	9	9	18	2	6	0	2	2	4
2020–21	Lokomotiv Yaroslavl	KHL	53	10	18	28	12	11	4	4	8	6
2021–22	Traktor Chelyabinsk	KHL	48	9	20	29	10	15	2	3	5	4
2022–23	Traktor Chelyabinsk	KHL	63	16	21	37	14	—	—	—	—	—
2023–24	Traktor Chelyabinsk	KHL	64	12	33	45	12	14	2	4	6	6
2024–25	Traktor Chelyabinsk	KHL	67	12	13	25	10	21	3	7	10	10
2025–26	Sibir Novosibirsk	KHL	30	5	8	13	8	—	—	—	—	—
2025–26	Torpedo Nizhny Novgorod	KHL	37	11	13	24	4	10	3	3	6	6
KHL totals			712	155	203	358	138	131	24	42	66	40

=== International ===
Year	Team	Event	Result	GP	G	A	Pts	PIM
2011	Russia	WJC18	3rd place, bronze medalist(s)	7	2	1	3	2
2013	Russia	WJC	3rd place, bronze medalist(s)	7	1	2	3	0
2017	Russia	WC	3rd place, bronze medalist(s)	10	1	1	2	0
2022	ROC	OG	2nd place, silver medalist(s)	6	1	1	2	2
Junior totals				14	3	3	6	2
Senior totals				16	2	2	4	2

== Awards and honours ==
Award	Year
KHL
Gagarin Cup (Ak Bars Kazan)	2018
