= Artyom Minulin =

Russian ice hockey player

- Born: 1 October 1998 (age 27) Tyumen, Russia
- Height: 6 ft 3 in (191 cm)
- Weight: 192 lb (87 kg; 13 st 10 lb)
- Position: Defence
- Shoots: Left
- KHL team: Metallurg Magnitogorsk
- National team: Russia
- NHL draft: Undrafted
- Playing career: 2019–present

Artyom Minulin (Russian: Артём Рафикович Минулин, born 1 October 1998) is a Russian professional ice hockey defenseman for Metallurg Magnitogorsk of the Kontinental Hockey League (KHL).

== Playing career ==
Minulin was drafted in the first round, 29th overall, by the Swift Current Broncos in the 2015 CHL Import Draft. On 31 October 2018, he was traded from the Broncos to the Everett Silvertips. In three seasons with the Broncos, he recorded 26 goals and 100 assists in 206 games. During the 2017–18 season, he won the WHL Championship with the Silvertips.

On 14 July 2019, Minulin signed a one-year contract with Metallurg Magnitogorsk of the KHL. He made his professional debut for Magnitogorsk during the 2019–20 season, where he appeared in 21 regular season games, and recorded one goal and two assists in five playoff games. On 1 May 2020, he signed a two-year contract extension with Magnitogorsk through the 2021–22 season.

== International play ==
Medal record

Ice hockey

Representing ROC

Olympic Games
Silver medal – second place	2022 Beijing	

Minulin represented Russia at the 2018 World Junior Ice Hockey Championships.

On 23 January 2022, Minulin was named to the roster to represent Russian Olympic Committee athletes at the 2022 Winter Olympics.

== Career statistics ==
=== Regular season and playoffs ===
			Regular season					Playoffs
Season	Team	League	GP	G	A	Pts	PIM	GP	G	A	Pts	PIM
2014–15	Metallurg Magnitogorsk	RUS U17	25	13	14	27	8	—	—	—	—	—
2014–15	Stalnye Lisy	MHL	2	0	0	0	0	—	—	—	—	—
2015–16	Swift Current Broncos	WHL	72	5	28	33	18	—	—	—	—	—
2016–17	Swift Current Broncos	WHL	70	8	42	50	21	14	2	5	7	8
2017–18	Swift Current Broncos	WHL	64	13	30	43	26	20	1	7	8	4
2018–19	Everett Silvertips	WHL	51	1	17	18	26	10	0	4	4	0
2019–20	Zauralie Kurgan	VHL	13	1	3	4	2	—	—	—	—	—
2019–20	Metallurg Magnitogorsk	KHL	21	0	0	0	4	5	1	2	3	0
2020–21	Metallurg Magnitogorsk	KHL	53	0	4	4	41	12	0	1	1	8
2021–22	Metallurg Magnitogorsk	KHL	46	3	10	13	34	16	0	3	3	2
2022–23	Metallurg Magnitogorsk	KHL	45	1	5	6	12	11	1	1	2	4
2023–24	Metallurg Magnitogorsk	KHL	51	3	6	9	12	21	1	3	4	8
2024–25	Metallurg Magnitogorsk	KHL	51	4	8	12	16	6	0	2	2	2
2025–26	Metallurg Magnitogorsk	KHL	58	4	15	19	18	15	2	1	3	8
KHL totals			325	15	48	63	137	86	5	13	18	32

=== International ===
Year	Team	Event	Result	GP	G	A	Pts	PIM
2014	Russia	U17	1st place, gold medalist(s)	6	0	1	1	2
2018	Russia	WJC	5th	5	0	0	0	4
Junior totals				11	0	1	1	6

== Awards and honors ==
Award	Year
KHL
Gagarin Cup (Metallurg Magnitogorsk)	2024
