= Andrei Chibisov =

Russian ice hockey player (born 1993)

- Born: 26 February 1993 (age 33) Prokopyevsk, Russia
- Height: 6 ft 4 in (193 cm)
- Weight: 227 lb (103 kg; 16 st 3 lb)
- Position: Right wing
- Shoots: Left
- KAZ team Former teams: Arlan Kokshetau; HC Yugra; Ak Bars Kazan; Metallurg Magnitogorsk; Winnipeg Jets
- National team: Russia
- NHL draft: Undrafted
- Playing career: 2014–present

Andrei Aleksandrovich Chibisov (Russian: Андрей Александрович Чибисов; born 26 February 1993) is a Russian professional ice hockey player for Arlan Kokshetau of the Kazakhstan Hockey Championship (KAZ).

== Playing career ==
Undrafted, he played in the Kontinental Hockey League for HC Yugra, Ak Bars Kazan and Metallurg Magnitogorsk. On June 2, 2019. Chibisov agreed to a contract in North America, signing a one-year, entry-level contract with the Winnipeg Jets.

After attending his first training camp in North America, Chibisov was assigned by the Jets to begin the 2019–20 season with American Hockey League affiliate, the Manitoba Moose. He remained with the Moose for the majority of the season, contributing with 7 goals and 25 points in 50 games. He was recalled by the Jets on two occasions, featuring in 2 NHL games, going scoreless.

With the AHL season prematurely ended due to the COVID-19 pandemic and left off the Jets Return to Play roster, Chibisov, as a free agent, returned to his native Russia, rejoining former club Metallurg Magnitogorsk on a three-year contract on 4 August 2020.

Having concluded his contract with Metallurg after three seasons, Chibisov, as a free agent, signed a one-year contract to move to Traktor Chelyabinsk on 4 May 2023.

Chibisov missed the entirety of the 2023–24 season due to injury and left Traktor after his contract expired. As a free agent, Chibisov opted to move to the Kazakhstani League, agreeing to terms with Arlan Kokshetau on 13 August 2024.

== International play ==
Medal record

Ice hockey

Representing ROC

Olympic Games
Silver medal – second place	2022 Beijing	

On 23 January 2022, Chibisov was named to the roster to represent Russian Olympic Committee athletes at the 2022 Winter Olympics.

== Career statistics ==
=== Regular season and playoffs ===
			Regular season					Playoffs
Season	Team	League	GP	G	A	Pts	PIM	GP	G	A	Pts	PIM
2011–12	Shakhter Prokopievsk	RUS.3	38	7	12	19	26	—	—	—	—	—
2012–13	Shakhter Prokopievsk	RUS.3	12	7	4	11	10	—	—	—	—	—
2013–14	Tyumensky Legion	MHL	15	11	9	20	24	—	—	—	—	—
2013–14	Rubin Tyumen	VHL	40	6	8	14	8	22	5	6	11	6
2014–15	HC Yugra	KHL	43	4	7	11	23	—	—	—	—	—
2014–15	Rubin Tyumen	VHL	4	0	1	1	2	10	4	3	7	6
2015–16	HC Yugra	KHL	4	0	0	0	0	—	—	—	—	—
2015–16	Ak Bars Kazan	KHL	37	0	6	6	20	6	0	1	1	4
2015–16	Bars Kazan	VHL	2	2	0	2	6	—	—	—	—	—
2016–17	Ak Bars Kazan	KHL	49	5	6	11	84	5	0	1	1	16
2016–17	Bars Kazan	VHL	4	1	3	4	6	—	—	—	—	—
2017–18	Ak Bars Kazan	KHL	6	1	1	2	4	—	—	—	—	—
2017–18	Bars Kazan	VHL	14	5	3	8	17	—	—	—	—	—
2017–18	Metallurg Magnitogorsk	KHL	31	9	7	16	12	11	0	1	1	8
2018–19	Metallurg Magnitogorsk	KHL	50	7	13	20	14	—	—	—	—	—
2019–20	Manitoba Moose	AHL	53	7	18	25	75	—	—	—	—	—
2019–20	Winnipeg Jets	NHL	2	0	0	0	0	—	—	—	—	—
2020–21	Metallurg Magnitogorsk	KHL	58	17	20	37	18	6	0	0	0	4
2021–22	Metallurg Magnitogorsk	KHL	48	19	15	34	20	24	6	7	13	26
2022–23	Metallurg Magnitogorsk	KHL	58	13	14	27	24	9	0	2	2	8
KHL totals			384	75	89	164	219	61	6	12	18	66
NHL totals			2	0	0	0	0	—	—	—	—	—

=== International ===
Year	Team	Event	Result	GP	G	A	Pts	PIM
2022	ROC	OG	2nd place, silver medalist(s)	6	1	0	1	4
Senior totals				6	1	0	1	4
