= Ivan Fedotov =

Russian ice hockey player (born 1996)

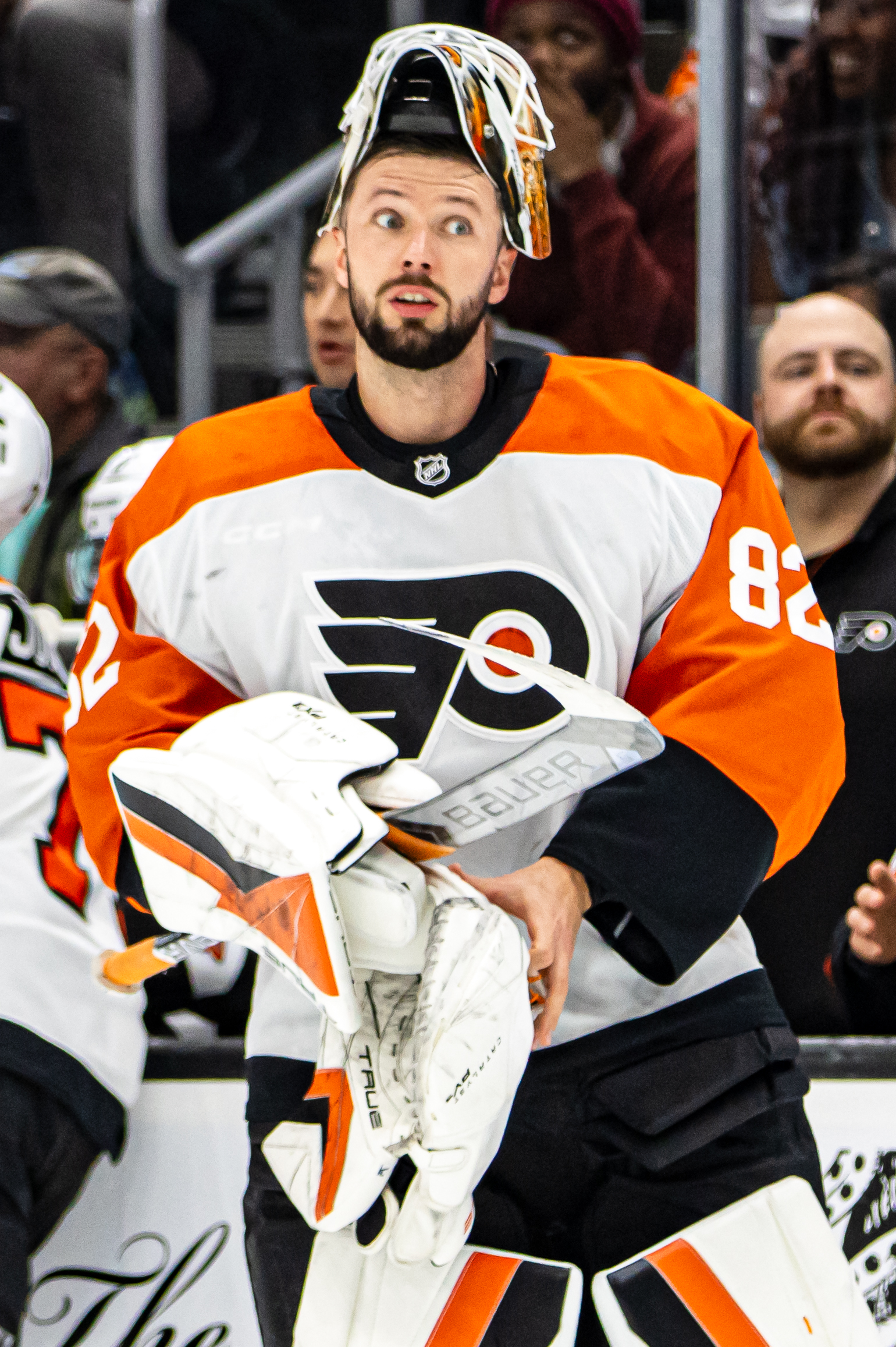
- Fedotov with the Flyers in 2024
- Born: 28 November 1996 (age 29) Lappeenranta, Finland
- Height: 6 ft 7 in (201 cm)
- Weight: 214 lb (97 kg; 15 st 4 lb)
- Position: Goaltender
- Catches: Left
- KHL team Former teams: Spartak Moscow; Neftekhimik Nizhnekamsk; Salavat Yulaev Ufa; Traktor Chelyabinsk; CSKA Moscow; Philadelphia Flyers
- National team: Russia
- NHL draft: 188th overall, 2015; Philadelphia Flyers
- Playing career: 2014–present

Ivan Dmitrievich Fedotov (Russian: Иван Дмитревич Федотов; born 28 November 1996) is a Finnish-born Russian professional ice hockey goaltender for HC Spartak Moscow of the Kontinental Hockey League (KHL). Fedotov was selected by the Philadelphia Flyers in the seventh round, 188th overall, of the 2015 NHL entry draft, but was detained and prevented from playing while serving in the Russian military. He ultimately joined the team in 2024.

== Playing career ==
On 12 December 2014, Fedotov made his Kontinental Hockey League (KHL) debut playing with Neftekhimik Nizhnekamsk during the 2014–15 KHL season. Fedotov was drafted by the Philadelphia Flyers in the seventh round of the 2015 NHL entry draft with the 188th overall selection.

Unable to add to his solitary game with Nizhnekamsk, Fedotov was traded to Salavat Yulaev Ufa on 4 May 2016.

Following the 2018–19 season, having played the majority of the year in Salavat's VHL farm club, Fedotov was traded to Traktor Chelyabinsk on 6 May 2019.

On 2 May 2021, Fedotov left Traktor after two seasons when he was traded to CSKA Moscow in exchange for financial compensation. In the 2021–22 season, while playing with the perennially contending CSKA, Fedotov assumed the starting goaltender role and appeared in 26 games with a 14–10–2 record and a 2.00 GAA and .919 save percentage. He collected 16 wins through 22 games in the post-season in helping CSKA claim their second Gagarin Cup in franchise history. He was named as a finalist for the KHL's top goaltender of the year.

On 7 May 2022, Fedotov as a free agent was signed to a one-year, entry-level contract with the Philadelphia Flyers for the 2022–23 season. While in preparation to depart for North America, on 1 July 2022, Fedotov was arrested for alleged evasion of military service in Russia and sent to Severomorsk, which prevented him from joining the Philadelphia Flyers. Fedotov would miss the entirety of the season to fulfil his military service requirements.

Upon completion of his compulsory training, Fedotov's contract with the Flyers was initially announced to have been tolled for the following 2023–24 season. However with the memorandum of understanding suspended between the NHL and KHL, Fedotov was signed to a two-year contract to resume his playing career with previous club, CSKA Moscow of the KHL on 8 July 2023. The KHL later announced to have registered his contract with CSKA on the basis of Fedotov not holding a 'valid and binding contract with a NHL club'. On 31 July, the NHL and the Flyers contested the KHL's decision to register his contract, and formally submitted a request to the International Ice Hockey Federation (IIHF) that his contract with the Flyers be tolled. CSKA terminated Fedotov's contract on 28 March 2024, and he then joined the Flyers for the remainder of the 2023–24 NHL season. Fedotov made his NHL debut in a 4–3 overtime loss against the New York Islanders on 1 April, entering the game in relief of Samuel Ersson and making 19 saves on 21 shots.

On 14 September 2025, Fedotov was traded to the Columbus Blue Jackets in exchange for a 2026 sixth-round draft pick. In playing out the final season of his NHL contract in the 2025–26 season, Fedotov played exclusively with Columbus' AHL affiliate, the Cleveland Monsters.

Having concluded his contract with the Blue Jackets, Fedotov as a free agent returned to Russia to sign a two-year contract with Spartak Moscow of the KHL on 2 July 2026.

== International play ==
Medal record

Men's ice hockey

Representing ROC

Olympic Games
Silver medal – second place	2022 Beijing	

On 23 January 2022, Fedotov was named to the roster of Russian Olympic Committee athletes for the 2022 Winter Olympics.

== Personal life ==
Fedotov was born in Lappeenranta, Finland, to a Finnish–Russian mother and a Russian father. He is of Finnish descent through his Finnish maternal grandparent. He has said: "I consider myself completely Russian. I have lived in Russia my entire life."

=== Arrest ===
On 1 July 2022, Fedotov was arrested in Saint Petersburg for alleged evasion of military service. He was reportedly hospitalized after falling ill with what his lawyer called stress-induced gastritis. He was then reportedly deployed to the town of Severomorsk, which is home to the administrative base of the Northern Fleet of the Russian Navy.

== Career statistics ==
=== Regular season and playoffs ===
			Regular season									Playoffs
Season	Team	League	GP	W	L	T/OT	MIN	GA	SO	GAA	SV%	GP	W	L	MIN	GA	SO	GAA	SV%
2013–14	Reaktor Nizhnekamsk	MHL	24	7	11	1	1273	70	0	3.30	.866	—	—	—	—	—	—	—	—
2014–15	Reaktor Nizhnekamsk	MHL	41	21	10	7	2305	75	6	1.95	.911	10	6	4	578	29	0	3.01	.894
2014–15	Neftekhimik Nizhnekamsk	KHL	1	0	0	0	20	2	0	6.00	.800	—	—	—	—	—	—	—	—
2015–16	Reaktor Nizhnekamsk	MHL	29	18	5	4	1646	61	5	2.22	.910	5	2	3	326	10	1	1.84	.916
2016–17	Toros Neftekamsk	VHL	7	5	2	0	419	12	0	1.72	.931	1	0	0	22	2	0	5.45	.867
2017–18	Toros Neftekamsk	VHL	25	8	7	4	1239	52	2	2.52	.899	1	0	0	5	0	0	0.00	1.000
2017–18	Salavat Yulaev Ufa	KHL	1	0	0	0	33	2	0	3.64	.917	—	—	—	—	—	—	—	—
2018–19	Toros Neftekamsk	VHL	26	14	5	5	1512	42	3	1.67	.929	1	0	0	40	2	0	3.00	.800
2018–19	Salavat Yulaev Ufa	KHL	3	2	0	0	173	6	0	2.08	.933	—	—	—	—	—	—	—	—
2019–20	Traktor Chelyabinsk	KHL	32	10	16	2	1482	52	3	2.11	.931	—	—	—	—	—	—	—	—
2019–20	Chelmet Chelyabinsk	VHL	3	1	2	0	178	8	0	2.70	.900	—	—	—	—	—	—	—	—
2020–21	Traktor Chelyabinsk	KHL	26	14	7	3	1496	55	1	2.21	.925	4	1	3	224	10	0	2.68	.904
2020–21	Chelmet Chelyabinsk	VHL	1	0	1	0	64	2	0	1.88	.917	—	—	—	—	—	—	—	—
2021–22	CSKA Moscow	KHL	26	14	10	2	1587	53	2	2.00	.919	22	16	6	1395	43	1	1.85	.937
2023–24	CSKA Moscow	KHL	44	21	22	1	2628	104	4	2.37	.914	5	1	4	304	13	1	2.57	.916
2023–24	Philadelphia Flyers	NHL	3	0	1	1	122	10	0	4.95	.811	—	—	—	—	—	—	—	—
2024–25	Philadelphia Flyers	NHL	26	6	13	4	1429	75	0	3.15	.880	—	—	—	—	—	—	—	—
2025–26	Cleveland Monsters	AHL	47	23	16	6	2719	130	2	2.87	.887	1	0	1	13	4	0	18.11	.333
KHL totals			133	61	55	8	7419	274	10	2.22	.921	31	18	13	1923	66	2	2.06	.930
NHL totals			29	6	14	5	1,550	85	0	3.29	.874	—	—	—	—	—	—	—	—

=== International ===
Year	Team	Event	Result	GP	W	L	OT	MIN	GA	SO	GAA	SV%
2022	ROC	OG	2nd place, silver medalist(s)	6	4	2	0	374	10	2	1.61	.943
Senior totals				6	4	2	0	374	10	2	1.61	.943

== Awards and honors ==
Award	Year	Ref
KHL
Gagarin Cup champion	2022	
