= Arseny Gritsyuk =

Russian ice hockey player (born 2001)

- Born: 15 March 2001 (age 25) Zheleznogorsk, Krasnoyarsk Krai, Russia
- Height: 5 ft 10 in (178 cm)
- Weight: 174 lb (79 kg; 12 st 6 lb)
- Position: Left wing
- Shoots: Left
- NHL team Former teams: New Jersey Devils: Avangard Omsk; SKA Saint Petersburg
- National team: Russia
- NHL draft: 129th overall, 2019; New Jersey Devils
- Playing career: 2020–present

Arseny Sergeyevich Gritsyuk (Russian: Арсений Сергеевич Грицюк; born 15 March 2001) is a Russian professional ice hockey player who is a winger for the New Jersey Devils of the National Hockey League (NHL). He was selected by the Devils 129th overall, in the fifth round of the 2019 NHL entry draft.

== Playing career ==
Gritsyuk was drafted in the fifth round, 129th overall, by the New Jersey Devils in the 2019 NHL entry draft. He made his Kontinental Hockey League (KHL) debut for Avangard Omsk during the 2020–21 season where he recorded one goal and one assist in 12 games and won the Gagarin Cup. On 30 April 2021, he signed a two-year contract extension with Avangard Omsk.

Following the 2021–22 season, in which he recorded 16 goals and 28 points in 39 KHL games, Gritsyuk was named KHL rookie of the year.

Having concluded his contract with Omsk, Gritsyuk remained un-signed from the Devils while his KHL rights were acquired by perennial contender SKA Saint Petersburg on 27 May 2023. He was signed soon after to a two-year contract extension to remain with SKA through 2025.

On 7 May 2025, having concluded his contract in the KHL, Gritsyuk moved to North America after he was signed to a one-year, entry-level contract with draft club, the New Jersey Devils for the 2025–26 season.

On 30 June 2026, Gritsyuk was resigned to a three-year, $9.75 million contract with the Devils.

== International play ==
Medal record

Men's ice hockey

Representing ROC

Olympic Games
Silver medal – second place	2022 Beijing	

Representing Russia

Hlinka Gretzky Cup
Bronze medal – third place	2018 Edmonton/Red Deer	

World U18 Championships
Silver medal – second place	2019 Sweden	

Gritsyuk represented Russia at under-18 tournaments twice, at the 2018 Hlinka Gretzky Cup, scoring three points in five games and winning the bronze medal, and the 2019 IIHF World U18 Championships, where he recorded three goals and two assists in seven games and won a silver medal.

His lone under-20 tournament appearance came at the 2021 World Junior Ice Hockey Championships, again with Russia, where he recorded one goal and three assists in six games.

He made his senior international tournament debut representing the Russian Olympic Committee at the 2022 Winter Olympics, winning a silver medal.

== Career statistics ==
=== Regular season and playoffs ===
			Regular season					Playoffs
Season	Team	League	GP	G	A	Pts	PIM	GP	G	A	Pts	PIM
2018–19	Omskie Yastreby	MHL	30	12	9	21	20	8	3	2	5	0
2019–20	HC Izhstal	VHL	2	1	2	3	0	—	—	—	—	—
2019–20	Omskie Yastreby	MHL	59	28	35	63	28	4	2	0	2	0
2020–21	Metallurg Novokuznetsk	VHL	8	2	4	6	2	—	—	—	—	—
2020–21	Omskie Yastreby	MHL	6	4	5	9	2	—	—	—	—	—
2020–21	Avangard Omsk	KHL	12	1	1	2	4	3	0	0	0	0
2021–22	Avangard Omsk	KHL	39	16	12	28	8	13	6	4	10	4
2022–23	Avangard Omsk	KHL	66	15	25	40	26	11	3	1	4	2
2023–24	SKA Saint Petersburg	KHL	50	19	19	38	8	10	4	2	6	2
2024–25	SKA Saint Petersburg	KHL	49	17	27	44	14	6	1	4	5	0
2025–26	New Jersey Devils	NHL	66	13	18	31	26	—	—	—	—	—
KHL totals			216	68	84	152	60	43	14	11	25	8
NHL totals			66	13	18	31	26	—	—	—	—	—

=== International ===
Year	Team	Event	Result	GP	G	A	Pts	PIM
2018	Russia	HG18	3rd place, bronze medalist(s)	5	2	1	3	0
2019	Russia	U18	2nd place, silver medalist(s)	7	3	2	5	4
2021	Russia	WJC	4th	6	1	3	4	0
2022	ROC	OG	2nd place, silver medalist(s)	6	1	2	3	0
Junior totals				18	6	6	12	4
Senior totals				6	1	2	3	0

== Awards and honours ==
Award	Year	Ref
KHL
Gagarin Cup champion	2021	
Rookie of the Year	2022	
