= Kirill Semyonov =

Russian ice hockey player

- Born: October 27, 1994 (age 31) Omsk, Russia
- Height: 6 ft 1 in (185 cm)
- Weight: 176 lb (80 kg; 12 st 8 lb)
- Position: Forward
- Shoots: Left
- KHL team Former teams: Ak Bars Kazan; Avangard Omsk; Metallurg Novokuznetsk; Toronto Maple Leafs
- National team: Russia
- NHL draft: Undrafted
- Playing career: 2013–present

Kirill Semyonov (born October 27, 1994) is a Russian professional ice hockey forward for Ak Bars Kazan of the Kontinental Hockey League (KHL). He formerly played in North America for the Toronto Maple Leafs.

== Playing career ==
Semyonov played as a youth within hometown club, Avangard Omsk of the Kontinental Hockey League (KHL). Semyonov made his professional and KHL debut playing with Avangard Omsk during the 2013–14 KHL season.

During the 2015–16 season, Semyonov was traded by Omsk to Metallurg Novokuznetsk in exchange for Maksim Kazakov on 14 December 2015. In an increased role, Semyonov featured in the final 20 regular season games with Novokuznetsk, posting 6 points. In the following 2016–17 season, Semyonov enjoyed a break out season with Novokuznetsk, leading the team in scoring with 13 goals and 27 points through 60 games in what would be the club's final season in the KHL.

Semyonov remained in the KHL, returning to original club Avangard Omsk on a two-year contract on 9 June 2017. Emerging as a top-six scoring role forward, Semyonov increased his goal totals in four consecutive seasons, leading Avangard in scoring during the 2019–20 season with 16 goals and 46 points through 62 regular season games to represent Avangard at the 2020 KHL All-Star Game.

In the following 2020–21 season, Semyonov after contributing with 26 points in 60 regular season games, posted career best playoff appearances by featuring in 23 post-season games and collecting 4 goals and 9 points to help Avangard claim their first Gagarin Cup in franchise history with a 4-2 series win over CSKA Moscow.

As an undrafted free agent, Semyonov left the KHL and signed a one-year, entry-level deal with the Toronto Maple Leafs of the NHL for the 2021–22 season on 5 May 2021. After attending the Maple Leafs 2021 training camp, Semyonov was assigned to begin his first North American season with American Hockey League affiliate, the Toronto Marlies. Semyonov scored at a point-per-game pace with 1 goal and 8 assists in 9 contests before he was recalled to the Maple Leafs on 7 November 2021. He made his NHL debut with the Maple Leafs, appearing in a bottom six forward role in a 3-0 victory over the Philadelphia Flyers on 10 November 2021. He featured in 3 games with the Maple Leafs without registering a point before he was returned to the AHL on 30 November 2021. Unwilling to continue in the AHL with the Marlies, Semyonov opted mutually terminate his contract with the Maple Leafs and was placed on unconditional waivers on 2 December 2021.

On 6 December 2021, Semyonov as a free agent subsequently returned to Russia and rejoined previous club, Avangard Omsk, for the remainder of the 2021–22 season.

On 5 May 2022, having left Avangard as a free agent, Semyonov signed a two-year contract with Ak Bars Kazan.

== International play ==
Medal record

Ice hockey

Representing ROC

Olympic Games
Silver medal – second place	2022 Beijing	

On 23 January 2022, Semyonov was named to the roster to represent Russian Olympic Committee athletes at the 2022 Winter Olympics.

== Career statistics ==
=== Regular season and playoffs ===
			Regular season					Playoffs
Season	Team	League	GP	G	A	Pts	PIM	GP	G	A	Pts	PIM
2012–13	Omskie Yastreby	MHL	60	14	11	25	26	13	2	4	6	14
2012–13	Yastreby Omsk	MHLB	2	2	3	5	2	—	—	—	—	—
2013–14	Omskie Yastreby	MHL	45	15	33	48	24	14	2	5	7	14
2013–14	Avangard Omsk	KHL	3	0	0	0	0	—	—	—	—	—
2014–15	Avangard Omsk	KHL	49	2	4	6	4	10	3	1	4	4
2015–16	Avangard Omsk	KHL	7	0	0	0	2	—	—	—	—	—
2015–16	Saryarka Karaganda	VHL	14	1	3	4	10	—	—	—	—	—
2015–16	Metallurg Novokuznetsk	KHL	20	1	5	6	16	—	—	—	—	—
2015–16	Metallurg Novokuznetsk	KHL	60	13	14	27	69	—	—	—	—	—
2017–18	Avangard Omsk	KHL	54	13	17	30	34	7	1	0	1	12
2018–19	Avangard Omsk	KHL	62	15	13	28	16	19	3	6	9	8
2019–20	Avangard Omsk	KHL	62	16	30	46	38	6	4	2	6	4
2020–21	Avangard Omsk	KHL	60	10	16	26	43	23	4	5	9	10
2021–22	Toronto Marlies	AHL	9	1	8	9	10	—	—	—	—	—
2021–22	Toronto Maple Leafs	NHL	3	0	0	0	0	—	—	—	—	—
2021–22	Avangard Omsk	KHL	8	1	3	4	4	13	3	3	6	8
2022–23	Ak Bars Kazan	KHL	68	11	23	34	53	24	2	3	5	10
2023–24	Ak Bars Kazan	KHL	68	13	28	41	30	5	0	0	0	2
2024–25	Ak Bars Kazan	KHL	68	18	37	55	46	13	2	7	9	8
2025–26	Ak Bars Kazan	KHL	68	18	38	56	49	20	4	10	14	10
KHL totals			657	131	228	359	404	140	26	37	63	76
NHL totals			3	0	0	0	0	—	—	—	—	—

=== International ===
Year	Team	Event	Result	GP	G	A	Pts	PIM
2022	ROC	OG	2nd place, silver medalist(s)	6	2	1	3	2
Senior totals				6	2	1	3	2

== Awards and honours ==
Award	Year
MHL
Champion (Omskie Yastreby)	2013
All-Star Game	2014
KHL
All-Star Game	2020
Gagarin Cup (Avangard Omsk)	2021
