= Alexander Yelesin =

Russian ice hockey player

- Born: 7 February 1996 (age 30) Yaroslavl, Russia
- Height: 5 ft 11 in (180 cm)
- Weight: 192 lb (87 kg; 13 st 10 lb)
- Position: Defence
- Shoots: Right
- KHL team Former teams: Lokomotiv Yaroslavl; Amur Khabarovsk; Calgary Flames
- National team: Russia
- NHL draft: Undrafted
- Playing career: 2016–present

Alexander Mikhailovich Yelesin (Russian: Александр Михайлович Елесин; born 7 February 1996) is a Russian professional ice hockey defenceman for Lokomotiv Yaroslavl of the Kontinental Hockey League (KHL).

== Playing career ==
Yelesin played as a youth within the Lokomotiv Yaroslavl program, joining the club to play at the under-16 level. He progressed his development, playing with a junior affiliate, Loko Yaroslavl, in the MHL. He scored 15 points in 63 games over three seasons with Loko, culminating in a championship title in 2015–16.

He made his professional debut during the 2015–16 season, playing with the second-tier club, HC Ryazan of the Supreme Hockey League (VHL). He split the year between Ryazan and the MHL and finished with 5 points in 22 games in the VHL.

On 1 July 2016, Yelesin was traded by Lokomotiv to Amur Khabarovsk in exchange for financial compensation. He made his debut for Amur in the Kontinental Hockey League during the 2016–17 season. He was scoreless with 11 minutes on ice in a 2-1 shootout victory of CSKA Moscow on 29 September 2016. As a defensive defenseman, Yelesin appeared in 22 games for the season, attributed with one assist.

On 16 May 2017, after a single season with Amur Khabarovsk, Yelesin was returned in a trade to Lokomotiv Yaroslavl.

In his second season with Lokomotiv in 2018–19, having established his role within the blueline, Yelesin's defensive abilities were noticed as he was selected to represent Lokomotiv at the 2019 KHL All-Star Game. In his first full season, Yelesin contributed 4 goals and 10 points in 55 regular season games. He was scoreless in 10 post-season games as Lokomotiv reached the Western Conference Semi-finals.

Undrafted and out of contract with Lokomotiv, Yelesin opted to pursue an NHL career, signing a two-year, entry-level contract with the Calgary Flames on 11 May 2019. In the following 2019–20 season, Yelesin made his NHL debut for the Calgary Flames against the Los Angeles Kings on 12 February 2020. He featured in 4 games, with the Flames going scoreless.

After the conclusion of his contract with the Flames, having primarily played with AHL affiliate, the Stockton Heat, Yelesin left as an impending restricted free agent to return to former Russian club Lokomotiv Yaroslavl of the KHL on a one-year contract on 17 June 2021.

== International play ==
Medal record

Ice hockey

Representing ROC

Olympic Games
Silver medal – second place	2022 Beijing	

On 23 January 2022, Yelesin was named to the roster to represent Russian Olympic Committee athletes at the 2022 Winter Olympics.

== Career statistics ==
=== Regular season and playoffs ===
			Regular season					Playoffs
Season	Team	League	GP	G	A	Pts	PIM	GP	G	A	Pts	PIM
2012–13	Loko Yaroslavl	RUS U17	33	7	9	16	54	—	—	—	—	—
2013–14	Loko Yaroslavl	MHL	3	0	0	0	0	—	—	—	—	—
2013–14	Loko Junior Yaroslavl	MHL B	17	2	1	3	16	16	0	0	0	8
2014–15	Loko Yaroslavl	MHL	37	3	4	7	56	3	0	1	1	2
2014–15	Loko Junior Yaroslavl	MHL B	19	2	2	4	28	8	0	3	3	12
2015–16	Loko Yaroslavl	MHL	21	2	5	7	26	10	0	1	1	18
2015–16	HC Ryazan	VHL	22	1	4	5	18	11	1	0	1	15
2016–17	Amurskie Tigry	MHL	2	1	0	1	2	—	—	—	—	—
2016–17	Amur Khabarovsk	KHL	22	0	1	1	8	—	—	—	—	—
2016–17	Sokol Krasnoyarsk	VHL	—	—	—	—	—	4	0	1	1	0
2017–18	Lokomotiv Yaroslavl	KHL	32	4	4	8	48	9	1	0	1	11
2017–18	HC Ryazan	VHL	2	0	0	0	0	—	—	—	—	—
2018–19	Lokomotiv Yaroslavl	KHL	55	4	6	10	47	10	0	0	0	10
2019–20	Stockton Heat	AHL	38	1	4	5	21	—	—	—	—	—
2019–20	Calgary Flames	NHL	4	0	0	0	0	—	—	—	—	—
2020–21	Stockton Heat	AHL	28	2	5	7	18	—	—	—	—	—
2021–22	Lokomotiv Yaroslavl	KHL	40	1	3	4	27	4	0	0	0	6
2022–23	Lokomotiv Yaroslavl	KHL	65	4	17	21	27	11	2	0	2	4
2023–24	Lokomotiv Yaroslavl	KHL	66	1	9	10	34	20	3	4	7	11
2024–25	Lokomotiv Yaroslavl	KHL	61	2	11	13	18	21	1	4	5	6
2025–26	Lokomotiv Yaroslavl	KHL	68	4	13	17	19	22	1	4	5	10
KHL totals			409	20	64	84	228	97	8	12	20	58
NHL totals			4	0	0	0	0	—	—	—	—	—

=== International ===
Year	Team	Event	Result	GP	G	A	Pts	PIM
2022	ROC	OG	2nd place, silver medalist(s)	6	0	0	0	2
Senior totals				6	0	0	0	2

== Awards and honours ==
Award	Year
MHL
Kharlamov Cup (Loko Yaroslavl)	2016
KHL
All-Star Game	2019
Gagarin Cup champion	2025, 2026
