= Timur Bilyalov =

Russian ice hockey player (born 1995)

- Born: 28 March 1995 (age 31) Kazan, Russia
- Height: 5 ft 10 in (178 cm)
- Weight: 174 lb (79 kg; 12 st 6 lb)
- Position: Goaltender
- Catches: Left
- KHL team Former teams: Ak Bars Kazan; Dinamo Riga
- National team: Russia
- Playing career: 2017–present

Timur Bilyalov (born 28 March 1995) is a Russian professional ice hockey goaltender currently playing for Ak Bars Kazan in the Kontinental Hockey League (KHL).

== International play ==
Medal record

Ice hockey

Representing ROC

Olympic Games
Silver medal – second place	2022 Beijing	

On 23 January 2022, Bilyalov was named to the roster to represent Russian Olympic Committee athletes at the 2022 Winter Olympics.
