= Ice hockey at the 2022 Winter Olympics – Men's team rosters =

These are the team rosters of the nations participating in the men's ice hockey tournament of the 2022 Winter Olympics.

Team Denmark was the oldest team in the tournament, averaging 30 years and 11 months. Team USA was the youngest, with 25 years and 5 months.

Age and clubs listed as of the start of the tournament, 9 February 2022.

== Group A ==
=== Canada ===
Head coach: Claude Julien

No.	Pos.	Name	Height	Weight	Birthdate	Team
1	G	Devon Levi	6 ft 0 in (183 cm)	185 lb (84 kg)	December 27, 2001 (aged 20)	(United States) Northeastern Huskies
3	D	Brandon Gormley	6 ft 2 in (188 cm)	196 lb (89 kg)	February 18, 1992 (aged 29)	(Russia) Lokomotiv Yaroslavl
5	D	Morgan Ellis	6 ft 2 in (188 cm)	207 lb (94 kg)	April 30, 1992 (aged 29)	(Germany) Eisbären Berlin
7	F	Daniel Carr	6 ft 0 in (183 cm)	194 lb (88 kg)	November 1, 1991 (aged 30)	(Switzerland) HC Lugano
9	F	Corban Knight	6 ft 1 in (185 cm)	196 lb (89 kg)	September 10, 1990 (aged 31)	(Russia) Avangard Omsk
10	F	Ben Street	6 ft 0 in (183 cm)	190 lb (86 kg)	February 13, 1987 (aged 34)	(Germany) EHC Red Bull München
11	F	Jack McBain	6 ft 3 in (191 cm)	201 lb (91 kg)	January 6, 2000 (aged 22)	(United States) Boston College Eagles
12	F	Eric Staal (C)	6 ft 4 in (193 cm)	194 lb (88 kg)	October 29, 1984 (aged 37)	(United States) Iowa Wild
13	F	Kent Johnson	6 ft 1 in (185 cm)	165 lb (75 kg)	October 18, 2002 (aged 19)	(United States) Michigan Wolverines
15	F	Adam Tambellini	6 ft 4 in (193 cm)	194 lb (88 kg)	November 1, 1994 (aged 27)	(Sweden) Rögle BK
19	F	Eric O'Dell	6 ft 0 in (183 cm)	205 lb (93 kg)	June 21, 1990 (aged 31)	(Russia) HC Dynamo Moscow
20	D	Alex Grant	6 ft 3 in (191 cm)	209 lb (95 kg)	January 20, 1989 (aged 33)	(Finland) Jokerit
22	D	Owen Power	6 ft 6 in (198 cm)	214 lb (97 kg)	November 22, 2002 (aged 19)	(United States) Michigan Wolverines
23	D	Tyler Wotherspoon	6 ft 2 in (188 cm)	207 lb (94 kg)	March 12, 1993 (aged 28)	(United States) Utica Comets
26	F	Daniel Winnik	6 ft 2 in (188 cm)	209 lb (95 kg)	March 6, 1985 (aged 36)	(Switzerland) Genève-Servette HC
27	F	Adam Cracknell	6 ft 3 in (191 cm)	209 lb (95 kg)	July 15, 1985 (aged 36)	(United States) Bakersfield Condors
32	F	Mason McTavish	6 ft 1 in (185 cm)	207 lb (94 kg)	January 30, 2003 (aged 19)	(Canada) Hamilton Bulldogs
37	D	Mat Robinson	5 ft 9 in (175 cm)	181 lb (82 kg)	January 20, 1986 (aged 36)	(Russia) SKA Saint Petersburg
39	F	Landon Ferraro	6 ft 0 in (183 cm)	176 lb (80 kg)	August 8, 1991 (aged 30)	(Germany) Kölner Haie
44	D	Mark Barberio	6 ft 1 in (185 cm)	207 lb (94 kg)	March 23, 1990 (aged 31)	(Russia) Ak Bars Kazan
51	F	David Desharnais (A)	5 ft 7 in (170 cm)	176 lb (80 kg)	September 14, 1986 (aged 35)	(Switzerland) HC Fribourg-Gottéron
56	D	Maxim Noreau (A)	5 ft 11 in (180 cm)	196 lb (89 kg)	May 24, 1987 (aged 34)	(Switzerland) ZSC Lions
60	D	Jason Demers	6 ft 1 in (185 cm)	194 lb (88 kg)	June 9, 1988 (aged 33)	(Russia) Ak Bars Kazan
80	G	Edward Pasquale	6 ft 3 in (191 cm)	218 lb (99 kg)	November 20, 1990 (aged 31)	(Russia) Lokomotiv Yaroslavl
90	G	Matt Tomkins	6 ft 3 in (191 cm)	194 lb (88 kg)	June 19, 1994 (aged 27)	(Sweden) Frölunda HC
91	F	Jordan Weal	5 ft 10 in (178 cm)	179 lb (81 kg)	April 15, 1992 (aged 29)	(Russia) Ak Bars Kazan
96	F	Josh Ho-Sang	6 ft 0 in (183 cm)	172 lb (78 kg)	January 22, 1996 (aged 26)	(Canada) Toronto Marlies

Sidney Crosby, Connor McDavid, and Alex Pietrangelo were named to the Canadian roster on October 3, 2021 but did not participate due to the NHL's decision not to send players to the Olympics due to the COVID-19 pandemic.

=== China ===
The roster was announced on 28 January 2022.

Due to the lack of ice hockey talent in China players had to be recruited from abroad. The men's hockey team has eleven Canadians, six Chinese, seven Americans, and a Russian. Neither the Chinese Olympic Committee, International Ice Hockey Federation nor the IOC commented on how it was possible for foreign players to compete for China, as the Olympic Charter requires competitors to be citizens of the country they represent. The IOC Executive Board has the authority to make certain exceptions of a "general or individual nature", though it is unclear whether this was the case. When asked whether he had naturalized as a Chinese citizen, athlete Jake Chelios refused to comment, though he confirmed that he still had his American passport.

Head coach: (Italy) Ivano Zanatta

No.	Pos.	Name	Height	Weight	Birthdate	Team
33	G	Pengfei Han	1.81 m (5 ft 11 in)	75 kg (165 lb)	May 29, 1991 (aged 30)	(China) HC Kunlun Red Star
1	G	Paris O'Brien	1.91 m (6 ft 3 in)	82 kg (181 lb)	April 15, 2000 (aged 21)	(China) HC Kunlun Red Star
45	G	Jeremy Smith	1.83 m (6 ft 0 in)	79 kg (175 lb)	April 13, 1989 (aged 32)	(China) HC Kunlun Red Star
7	D	Jake Chelios	1.88 m (6 ft 2 in)	84 kg (185 lb)	March 8, 1991 (aged 30)	(China) HC Kunlun Red Star
6	D	Zimeng Chen	1.78 m (5 ft 10 in)	81 kg (179 lb)	June 26, 1997 (aged 24)	(China) HC Kunlun Red Star
2	D	Jason Fram	1.8 m (5 ft 11 in)	88 kg (194 lb)	April 23, 1995 (aged 26)	(China) HC Kunlun Red Star
60	D	Denis Osipov	1.83 m (6 ft 0 in)	90 kg (198 lb)	May 9, 1987 (aged 34)	(China) HC Kunlun Red Star
77	D	Ty Schultz (A)	1.85 m (6 ft 1 in)	91 kg (201 lb)	March 5, 1997 (aged 24)	(China) HC Kunlun Red Star
5	D	Ryan Sproul	1.93 m (6 ft 4 in)	91 kg (200 lb)	January 13, 1993 (aged 29)	(China) HC Kunlun Red Star
81	D	Ruinan Yan	1.89 m (6 ft 2 in)	90 kg (198 lb)	January 25, 2001 (aged 21)	(China) HC Kunlun Red Star
93	D	Zach Yuen	1.85 m (6 ft 1 in)	89 kg (196 lb)	March 3, 1993 (aged 28)	(China) HC Kunlun Red Star
11	D	Pengfei Zhang	1.77 m (5 ft 10 in)	67 kg (148 lb)	May 9, 1998 (aged 23)	(China) HC Kunlun Red Star
22	F	Parker Foo	1.85 m (6 ft 1 in)	78 kg (172 lb)	September 12, 1998 (aged 23)	(China) HC Kunlun Red Star
15	F	Spencer Foo (A)	1.83 m (6 ft 0 in)	86 kg (190 lb)	May 19, 1994 (aged 27)	(China) HC Kunlun Red Star
17	F	Jianing Guo	1.77 m (5 ft 10 in)	77 kg (170 lb)	April 26, 2000 (aged 21)	(China) HC Kunlun Red Star
47	F	Cory Kane	1.87 m (6 ft 2 in)	94 kg (207 lb)	September 15, 1990 (aged 31)	(China) HC Kunlun Red Star
20	F	Luke Lockhart	1.77 m (5 ft 10 in)	87 kg (192 lb)	November 1, 1992 (aged 29)	(China) HC Kunlun Red Star
61	F	Ethan Werek	1.88 m (6 ft 2 in)	91 kg (200 lb)	June 7, 1991 (aged 30)	(China) HC Kunlun Red Star
91	F	Tyler Wong	1.75 m (5 ft 9 in)	78 kg (172 lb)	February 28, 1996 (aged 25)	(China) HC Kunlun Red Star
10	F	Xudong Xiang	1.75 m (5 ft 9 in)	72 kg (159 lb)	August 24, 1995 (aged 26)	(China) HC Kunlun Red Star
88	F	Yan Juncheng	1.8 m (5 ft 11 in)	82 kg (181 lb)	September 16, 2000 (aged 21)	(China) HC Kunlun Red Star
98	F	Rudi Ying	1.85 m (6 ft 1 in)	77 kg (169 lb)	August 16, 1998 (aged 23)	(China) HC Kunlun Red Star
18	F	Brandon Yip (C)	1.85 m (6 ft 1 in)	88 kg (194 lb)	April 25, 1985 (aged 36)	(China) HC Kunlun Red Star
56	F	Zesen Zhang	1.76 m (5 ft 9 in)	65 kg (143 lb)	December 19, 1996 (aged 25)	(China) HC Kunlun Red Star
19	F	Peter Zhong	1.8 m (5 ft 11 in)	79 kg (174 lb)	July 30, 1998 (aged 23)	(China) HC Kunlun Red Star

=== Germany ===
The roster was announced on 25 January 2022.

Head coach: (Finland) Toni Söderholm

No.	Pos.	Name	Height	Weight	Birthdate	Team
3	D	Dominik Bittner	1.81 m (5 ft 11 in)	76 kg (168 lb)	10 June 1992 (aged 29)	(Germany) Grizzlys Wolfsburg
5	D	Korbinian Holzer (A)	1.90 m (6 ft 3 in)	94 kg (207 lb)	16 February 1988 (aged 33)	(Germany) Adler Mannheim
8	F	Tobias Rieder	1.80 m (5 ft 11 in)	82 kg (181 lb)	10 January 1993 (aged 29)	(Sweden) Växjö Lakers
11	D	Marco Nowak	1.89 m (6 ft 2 in)	93 kg (205 lb)	23 July 1990 (aged 31)	(Germany) Düsseldorfer EG
15	F	Stefan Loibl	1.86 m (6 ft 1 in)	83 kg (183 lb)	24 June 1996 (aged 25)	(Sweden) Skellefteå AIK
16	D	Konrad Abeltshauser	1.95 m (6 ft 5 in)	102 kg (225 lb)	2 September 1992 (aged 29)	(Germany) EHC Red Bull München
21	F	Nico Krämmer	1.86 m (6 ft 1 in)	94 kg (207 lb)	23 October 1992 (aged 29)	(Germany) Adler Mannheim
22	F	Matthias Plachta	1.88 m (6 ft 2 in)	100 kg (220 lb)	16 May 1991 (aged 30)	(Germany) Adler Mannheim
33	G	Danny aus den Birken	1.86 m (6 ft 1 in)	87 kg (192 lb)	15 February 1985 (aged 36)	(Germany) EHC Red Bull München
34	F	Tom Kühnhackl	1.87 m (6 ft 2 in)	89 kg (196 lb)	21 January 1992 (aged 30)	(Sweden) Skellefteå AIK
35	G	Mathias Niederberger	1.80 m (5 ft 11 in)	80 kg (180 lb)	26 November 1992 (aged 29)	(Germany) Eisbären Berlin
38	D	Fabio Wagner	1.82 m (6 ft 0 in)	83 kg (183 lb)	17 September 1995 (aged 26)	(Germany) ERC Ingolstadt
41	D	Jonas Müller	1.83 m (6 ft 0 in)	88 kg (194 lb)	19 November 1995 (aged 26)	(Germany) Eisbären Berlin
42	F	Yasin Ehliz	1.80 m (5 ft 11 in)	84 kg (185 lb)	30 December 1992 (aged 29)	(Germany) EHC Red Bull München
50	F	Patrick Hager (A)	1.78 m (5 ft 10 in)	80 kg (180 lb)	8 September 1988 (aged 33)	(Germany) EHC Red Bull München
54	F	Lean Bergmann	1.87 m (6 ft 2 in)	93 kg (205 lb)	4 October 1998 (aged 23)	(Germany) Adler Mannheim
72	F	Dominik Kahun	1.80 m (5 ft 11 in)	82 kg (181 lb)	2 July 1995 (aged 26)	(Switzerland) SC Bern
83	F	Leonhard Pföderl	1.82 m (6 ft 0 in)	87 kg (192 lb)	1 September 1993 (aged 28)	(Germany) Eisbären Berlin
85	D	Marcel Brandt	1.76 m (5 ft 9 in)	80 kg (180 lb)	8 May 1992 (aged 29)	(Germany) Straubing Tigers
86	F	Daniel Pietta	1.85 m (6 ft 1 in)	93 kg (205 lb)	9 December 1986 (aged 35)	(Germany) ERC Ingolstadt
89	F	David Wolf	1.89 m (6 ft 2 in)	98 kg (216 lb)	15 September 1989 (aged 32)	(Germany) Adler Mannheim
90	G	Felix Brückmann	1.81 m (5 ft 11 in)	83 kg (183 lb)	16 December 1990 (aged 31)	(Germany) Adler Mannheim
91	D	Moritz Müller (C)	1.87 m (6 ft 2 in)	92 kg (203 lb)	19 November 1986 (aged 35)	(Germany) Kölner Haie
92	F	Marcel Noebels	1.92 m (6 ft 4 in)	92 kg (203 lb)	14 March 1992 (aged 29)	(Germany) Eisbären Berlin
95	F	Frederik Tiffels	1.85 m (6 ft 1 in)	91 kg (201 lb)	20 May 1995 (aged 26)	(Germany) EHC Red Bull München

Leon Draisaitl, Moritz Seider, and Philipp Grubauer were named to the German roster on October 8, 2021 but did not participate due to the NHL's decision not to send players to the Olympics due to the COVID-19 pandemic.

=== United States ===
The following is the American roster in the men's ice hockey tournament of the 2022 Winter Olympics. The roster was announced on January 13, 2022.

Head coach: David Quinn

No.	Pos.	Name	Height	Weight	Birthdate	Team
4	D	Drew Helleson	6 ft 3 in (191 cm)	190 lb (86 kg)	March 26, 2001 (aged 20)	(United States) Boston College Eagles
5	D	David Warsofsky	5 ft 9 in (175 cm)	171 lb (78 kg)	May 30, 1990 (aged 31)	(Germany) ERC Ingolstadt
6	D	Nick Perbix	6 ft 4 in (193 cm)	201 lb (91 kg)	June 15, 1998 (aged 23)	(United States) St. Cloud State Huskies
8	D	Jake Sanderson	6 ft 2 in (188 cm)	185 lb (84 kg)	July 8, 2002 (aged 19)	(United States) North Dakota Fighting Hawks
10	F	Matty Beniers	6 ft 1 in (185 cm)	175 lb (79 kg)	November 5, 2002 (aged 19)	(United States) Michigan Wolverines
11	F	Kenny Agostino	6 ft 0 in (183 cm)	202 lb (92 kg)	April 30, 1992 (aged 29)	(Russia) Torpedo Nizhny Novgorod
12	F	Sam Hentges	6 ft 0 in (183 cm)	174 lb (79 kg)	July 26, 1999 (aged 22)	(United States) St. Cloud State Huskies
13	F	Nathan Smith	6 ft 1 in (185 cm)	190 lb (86 kg)	October 18, 1998 (aged 23)	(United States) Minnesota State Mavericks
14	D	Brock Faber	6 ft 0 in (183 cm)	190 lb (86 kg)	August 22, 2002 (aged 19)	(United States) Minnesota Golden Gophers
16	F	Nick Abruzzese	5 ft 10 in (178 cm)	174 lb (79 kg)	June 4, 1999 (aged 22)	(United States) Harvard Crimson
19	F	Brendan Brisson	6 ft 0 in (183 cm)	180 lb (82 kg)	October 22, 2001 (aged 20)	(United States) Michigan Wolverines
20	D	Steven Kampfer (A)	5 ft 11 in (180 cm)	197 lb (89 kg)	September 24, 1988 (aged 33)	(Russia) Ak Bars Kazan
21	F	Brian O'Neill	5 ft 9 in (175 cm)	175 lb (79 kg)	June 1, 1988 (aged 33)	(Finland) Jokerit
23	D	Brian Cooper	5 ft 10 in (178 cm)	196 lb (89 kg)	November 1, 1993 (aged 28)	(Sweden) IK Oskarshamn
25	F	Marc McLaughlin	6 ft 0 in (183 cm)	205 lb (93 kg)	July 26, 1999 (aged 22)	(United States) Boston College Eagles
26	F	Sean Farrell	5 ft 9 in (175 cm)	174 lb (79 kg)	November 2, 2001 (aged 20)	(United States) Harvard Crimson
27	F	Noah Cates (A)	6 ft 2 in (188 cm)	188 lb (85 kg)	February 5, 1999 (aged 23)	(United States) Minnesota Duluth Bulldogs
29	G	Drew Commesso	6 ft 2 in (188 cm)	181 lb (82 kg)	July 19, 2002 (aged 19)	(United States) Boston University Terriers
31	G	Strauss Mann	6 ft 0 in (183 cm)	174 lb (79 kg)	August 18, 1998 (aged 23)	(Sweden) Skellefteå AIK
35	G	Pat Nagle	6 ft 3 in (191 cm)	185 lb (84 kg)	September 21, 1987 (aged 34)	(United States) Lehigh Valley Phantoms
37	F	Nick Shore	6 ft 1 in (185 cm)	195 lb (88 kg)	September 26, 1992 (aged 29)	(Russia) HC Sibir Novosibirsk
39	F	Ben Meyers	5 ft 11 in (180 cm)	194 lb (88 kg)	November 15, 1998 (aged 23)	(United States) Minnesota Golden Gophers
42	D	Aaron Ness	5 ft 10 in (178 cm)	170 lb (77 kg)	May 18, 1990 (aged 31)	(United States) Providence Bruins
51	F	Andy Miele (C)	5 ft 7 in (170 cm)	169 lb (77 kg)	April 15, 1988 (aged 33)	(Russia) Torpedo Nizhny Novgorod
67	F	Matthew Knies	6 ft 3 in (191 cm)	212 lb (96 kg)	October 17, 2002 (aged 19)	(United States) Minnesota Golden Gophers
89	F	Justin Abdelkader	6 ft 2 in (188 cm)	212 lb (96 kg)	January 25, 1987 (aged 35)	(United States) Grand Rapids Griffins

Auston Matthews, Patrick Kane, and Seth Jones were named to the American roster on October 7, 2021 but did not participate due to the NHL's decision not to send players to the Olympics due to the COVID-19 pandemic.

== Group B ==
=== Czech Republic ===
The roster was announced on 13 January 2022.

Head coach: Filip Pešán

No.	Pos.	Name	Height	Weight	Birthdate	Team
3	D	Ronald Knot	1.93 m (6 ft 4 in)	95 kg (209 lb)	3 August 1994 (aged 27)	(Russia) Neftekhimik Nizhnekamsk
5	D	Jakub Jeřábek (A)	1.80 m (5 ft 11 in)	88 kg (194 lb)	12 May 1991 (aged 30)	(Russia) Spartak Moscow
9	D	David Sklenička	1.80 m (5 ft 11 in)	82 kg (181 lb)	8 September 1996 (aged 25)	(Finland) Jokerit
10	F	Roman Červenka (C)	1.82 m (6 ft 0 in)	89 kg (196 lb)	10 December 1985 (aged 36)	(Switzerland) Rapperswil-Jona Lakers
13	F	Jiří Smejkal	1.89 m (6 ft 2 in)	83 kg (183 lb)	5 November 1996 (aged 25)	(Finland) Lahti Pelicans
17	F	Vladimír Sobotka	1.80 m (5 ft 11 in)	89 kg (196 lb)	2 July 1987 (aged 34)	(Czech Republic) Sparta Praha
20	F	Hynek Zohorna	1.88 m (6 ft 2 in)	94 kg (207 lb)	1 August 1990 (aged 31)	(Sweden) IK Oskarshamn
25	F	Radan Lenc	1.80 m (5 ft 11 in)	79 kg (174 lb)	30 July 1991 (aged 30)	(Russia) Amur Khabarovsk
26	F	Michal Řepík	1.79 m (5 ft 10 in)	86 kg (190 lb)	31 December 1988 (aged 33)	(Czech Republic) Sparta Praha
30	G	Šimon Hrubec	1.86 m (6 ft 1 in)	83 kg (183 lb)	30 June 1991 (aged 30)	(Russia) Avangard Omsk
31	D	Lukáš Klok	1.85 m (6 ft 1 in)	85 kg (187 lb)	7 June 1995 (aged 26)	(Russia) Neftekhimik Nizhnekamsk
35	G	Roman Will	1.80 m (5 ft 11 in)	85 kg (187 lb)	22 May 1992 (aged 29)	(Russia) Traktor Chelyabinsk
37	G	Patrik Bartošák	1.85 m (6 ft 1 in)	90 kg (200 lb)	29 March 1993 (aged 28)	(Russia) Amur Khabarovsk
38	F	Tomáš Hyka	1.80 m (5 ft 11 in)	84 kg (185 lb)	23 March 1993 (aged 28)	(Russia) Traktor Chelyabinsk
43	F	Jan Kovář	1.81 m (5 ft 11 in)	98 kg (216 lb)	20 March 1990 (aged 31)	(Switzerland) EV Zug
44	F	Matěj Stránský	1.91 m (6 ft 3 in)	93 kg (205 lb)	11 July 1993 (aged 28)	(Switzerland) HC Davos
45	F	Lukáš Sedlák	1.82 m (6 ft 0 in)	96 kg (212 lb)	25 February 1993 (aged 28)	(Russia) Traktor Chelyabinsk
46	F	David Krejčí (A)	1.83 m (6 ft 0 in)	85 kg (187 lb)	28 April 1986 (aged 35)	(Czech Republic) HC Olomouc
52	F	Michael Špaček	1.80 m (5 ft 11 in)	85 kg (187 lb)	9 April 1997 (aged 24)	(Sweden) Frölunda HC
65	D	Vojtěch Mozík	1.90 m (6 ft 3 in)	91 kg (201 lb)	26 December 1992 (aged 29)	(Russia) Admiral Vladivostok
67	F	Michael Frolík	1.85 m (6 ft 1 in)	86 kg (190 lb)	17 February 1988 (aged 33)	(Switzerland) Lausanne HC
79	F	Tomáš Zohorna	1.85 m (6 ft 1 in)	95 kg (209 lb)	3 January 1988 (aged 34)	(Sweden) IK Oskarshamn
84	D	Tomáš Kundrátek	1.87 m (6 ft 2 in)	91 kg (201 lb)	26 December 1989 (aged 32)	(Czech Republic) Oceláři Třinec
88	D	Libor Šulák	1.89 m (6 ft 2 in)	86 kg (190 lb)	4 March 1994 (aged 27)	(Russia) Admiral Vladivostok

Jakub Voráček, David Pastrňák, and Ondřej Palát were named to the Czech roster on October 7, 2021 but did not participate due to the NHL's decision not to send players to the Olympics due to the COVID-19 pandemic.

=== Denmark ===
The roster was announced on 18 January 2022.

Head coach: Heinz Ehlers

No.	Pos.	Name	Height	Weight	Birthdate	Team
1	G	Frederik Dichow	1.95 m (6 ft 5 in)	87 kg (192 lb)	1 March 2001 (aged 20)	(Sweden) Kristianstads IK
2	D	Phillip Bruggisser	1.83 m (6 ft 0 in)	85 kg (187 lb)	7 August 1991 (aged 30)	(Germany) Fischtown Pinguins
9	F	Frederik Storm	1.80 m (5 ft 11 in)	86 kg (190 lb)	20 February 1989 (aged 32)	(Germany) ERC Ingolstadt
15	D	Matias Lassen	1.82 m (6 ft 0 in)	82 kg (181 lb)	15 March 1996 (aged 25)	(Sweden) Malmö Redhawks
16	F	Matthias Asperup	1.82 m (6 ft 0 in)	84 kg (185 lb)	3 March 1995 (aged 26)	(Denmark) Herlev Eagles
17	F	Nicklas Jensen	1.91 m (6 ft 3 in)	98 kg (216 lb)	6 March 1993 (aged 28)	(Finland) Jokerit
22	D	Markus Lauridsen	1.86 m (6 ft 1 in)	87 kg (192 lb)	28 February 1991 (aged 30)	(Sweden) Malmö Redhawks
25	D	Oliver Lauridsen	1.97 m (6 ft 6 in)	93 kg (205 lb)	24 March 1989 (aged 32)	(Sweden) Malmö Redhawks
28	D	Emil Kristensen	1.84 m (6 ft 0 in)	81 kg (179 lb)	20 September 1992 (aged 29)	(Italy) HC Pustertal Wölfe
29	F	Morten Madsen	1.90 m (6 ft 3 in)	95 kg (209 lb)	16 January 1987 (aged 35)	(Sweden) Timrå IK
31	G	Patrick Galbraith	1.83 m (6 ft 0 in)	81 kg (179 lb)	11 March 1986 (aged 35)	(Denmark) SønderjyskE Ishockey
32	G	Sebastian Dahm	1.82 m (6 ft 0 in)	83 kg (183 lb)	28 February 1987 (aged 34)	(Austria) EC KAC
33	F	Julian Jakobsen	1.84 m (6 ft 0 in)	87 kg (192 lb)	11 April 1987 (aged 34)	(Denmark) Aalborg Pirates
38	F	Morten Poulsen	1.86 m (6 ft 1 in)	95 kg (209 lb)	9 September 1988 (aged 33)	(Denmark) Herning Blue Fox
40	F	Jesper Jensen	1.83 m (6 ft 0 in)	80 kg (180 lb)	5 February 1987 (aged 35)	(Denmark) Frederikshavn White Hawks
41	D	Jesper Jensen Aabo (A)	1.83 m (6 ft 0 in)	93 kg (205 lb)	30 July 1991 (aged 30)	(Germany) Krefeld Pinguine
47	D	Oliver Larsen	1.85 m (6 ft 1 in)	94 kg (207 lb)	25 December 1998 (aged 23)	(Finland) Mikkelin Jukurit
48	D	Nicholas Jensen	1.89 m (6 ft 2 in)	102 kg (225 lb)	8 April 1989 (aged 32)	(Germany) Eisbären Berlin
50	F	Mathias Bau Hansen	2.00 m (6 ft 7 in)	108 kg (238 lb)	3 July 1993 (aged 28)	(Denmark) Herning Blue Fox
51	F	Frans Nielsen (A)	1.85 m (6 ft 1 in)	82 kg (181 lb)	24 April 1984 (aged 37)	(Germany) Eisbären Berlin
63	F	Patrick Russell	1.85 m (6 ft 1 in)	93 kg (205 lb)	4 January 1993 (aged 29)	(Sweden) Linköping HC
72	F	Nicolai Meyer	1.79 m (5 ft 10 in)	82 kg (181 lb)	21 July 1993 (aged 28)	(Austria) Vienna Capitals
89	F	Mikkel Bødker	1.82 m (6 ft 0 in)	95 kg (209 lb)	16 December 1989 (aged 32)	(Switzerland) HC Lugano
93	F	Peter Regin (C)	1.88 m (6 ft 2 in)	93 kg (205 lb)	16 April 1986 (aged 35)	(Switzerland) HC Ambrì-Piotta
95	F	Nick Olesen	1.85 m (6 ft 1 in)	84 kg (185 lb)	14 November 1995 (aged 26)	(Sweden) Brynäs IF

Nikolaj Ehlers, Oliver Bjorkstrand, and Alexander True were named to the Danish roster on October 8, 2021 but did not participate due to the NHL's decision not to send players to the Olympics due to the COVID-19 pandemic.

=== ROC ===
The roster was announced on 23 January 2022.

Head coach: Alexei Zhamnov

No.	Pos.	Name	Height	Weight	Birthdate	Team
4	D	Alexander Yelesin	1.81 m (5 ft 11 in)	87 kg (192 lb)	7 February 1996 (aged 26)	(Russia) Lokomotiv Yaroslavl
7	D	Sergei Telegin	1.81 m (5 ft 11 in)	78 kg (172 lb)	21 September 2000 (aged 21)	(Russia) Traktor Chelyabinsk
10	F	Dmitri Voronkov	1.92 m (6 ft 4 in)	86 kg (190 lb)	10 September 2000 (aged 21)	(Russia) Ak Bars Kazan
11	F	Sergei Andronov (A)	1.89 m (6 ft 2 in)	94 kg (207 lb)	19 July 1989 (aged 32)	(Russia) HC CSKA Moscow
15	F	Pavel Karnaukhov	1.90 m (6 ft 3 in)	96 kg (212 lb)	15 March 1997 (aged 24)	(Russia) HC CSKA Moscow
16	F	Sergei Plotnikov	1.87 m (6 ft 2 in)	93 kg (205 lb)	3 June 1990 (aged 31)	(Russia) HC CSKA Moscow
22	F	Stanislav Galiev	1.88 m (6 ft 2 in)	82 kg (181 lb)	17 January 1992 (aged 30)	(Russia) HC Dynamo Moscow
24	F	Artur Kayumov	1.81 m (5 ft 11 in)	82 kg (181 lb)	14 February 1998 (aged 23)	(Russia) Lokomotiv Yaroslavl
25	F	Mikhail Grigorenko	1.90 m (6 ft 3 in)	97 kg (214 lb)	16 May 1994 (aged 27)	(Russia) HC CSKA Moscow
27	D	Slava Voynov	1.82 m (6 ft 0 in)	87 kg (192 lb)	15 January 1990 (aged 32)	(Russia) HC Dynamo Moscow
28	G	Ivan Fedotov	2.00 m (6 ft 7 in)	94 kg (207 lb)	28 November 1996 (aged 25)	(Russia) HC CSKA Moscow
31	G	Alexander Samonov	1.82 m (6 ft 0 in)	76 kg (168 lb)	23 August 1995 (aged 26)	(Russia) SKA Saint Petersburg
43	D	Damir Sharipzyanov	1.88 m (6 ft 2 in)	94 kg (207 lb)	17 February 1996 (aged 25)	(Russia) Avangard Omsk
44	D	Egor Yakovlev (A)	1.80 m (5 ft 11 in)	86 kg (190 lb)	17 September 1991 (aged 30)	(Russia) Metallurg Magnitogorsk
55	F	Vladimir Tkachyov	1.83 m (6 ft 0 in)	95 kg (209 lb)	5 October 1993 (aged 28)	(Russia) Traktor Chelyabinsk
57	D	Alexander Nikishin	1.93 m (6 ft 4 in)	98 kg (216 lb)	2 October 2001 (aged 20)	(Russia) HC Spartak Moscow
58	F	Anton Slepyshev	1.88 m (6 ft 2 in)	99 kg (218 lb)	13 May 1994 (aged 27)	(Russia) HC CSKA Moscow
72	D	Artyom Minulin	1.90 m (6 ft 3 in)	87 kg (192 lb)	1 October 1998 (aged 23)	(Russia) Metallurg Magnitogorsk
76	F	Andrei Chibisov	1.92 m (6 ft 4 in)	103 kg (227 lb)	26 February 1993 (aged 28)	(Russia) Metallurg Magnitogorsk
81	F	Arseni Gritsyuk	1.82 m (6 ft 0 in)	84 kg (185 lb)	15 March 2001 (aged 20)	(Russia) Avangard Omsk
82	G	Timur Bilyalov	1.79 m (5 ft 10 in)	79 kg (174 lb)	28 March 1995 (aged 26)	(Russia) Ak Bars Kazan
87	F	Vadim Shipachyov (C)	1.84 m (6 ft 0 in)	86 kg (190 lb)	12 March 1987 (aged 34)	(Russia) HC Dynamo Moscow
89	D	Nikita Nesterov	1.83 m (6 ft 0 in)	91 kg (201 lb)	28 March 1993 (aged 28)	(Russia) HC CSKA Moscow
94	F	Kirill Semyonov	1.85 m (6 ft 1 in)	80 kg (180 lb)	27 October 1994 (aged 27)	(Russia) Avangard Omsk
97	F	Nikita Gusev	1.75 m (5 ft 9 in)	74 kg (163 lb)	8 July 1992 (aged 29)	(Russia) SKA Saint Petersburg

Alexander Ovechkin, Nikita Kucherov, and Andrei Vasilevskiy were named to the ROC roster on October 8, 2021 but did not participate due to the NHL's decision not to send players to the Olympics due to the COVID-19 pandemic.

=== Switzerland ===
The roster was announced on 18 January 2022.

Head coach: Patrick Fischer

No.	Pos.	Name	Height	Weight	Birthdate	Team
2	D	Santeri Alatalo	1.80 m (5 ft 11 in)	80 kg (180 lb)	9 May 1990 (aged 31)	(Switzerland) HC Lugano
6	D	Yannick Weber	1.81 m (5 ft 11 in)	91 kg (201 lb)	23 September 1988 (aged 33)	(Switzerland) ZSC Lions
10	F	Andres Ambühl	1.76 m (5 ft 9 in)	86 kg (190 lb)	14 September 1983 (aged 38)	(Switzerland) HC Davos
11	F	Sven Senteler	1.85 m (6 ft 1 in)	90 kg (200 lb)	11 August 1992 (aged 29)	(Switzerland) EV Zug
15	F	Grégory Hofmann	1.82 m (6 ft 0 in)	91 kg (201 lb)	13 November 1992 (aged 29)	(Switzerland) EV Zug
16	D	Raphael Diaz (C)	1.81 m (5 ft 11 in)	89 kg (196 lb)	9 January 1986 (aged 36)	(Switzerland) HC Fribourg-Gottéron
20	G	Reto Berra	1.94 m (6 ft 4 in)	99 kg (218 lb)	3 January 1987 (aged 35)	(Switzerland) HC Fribourg-Gottéron
25	D	Mirco Müller	1.91 m (6 ft 3 in)	95 kg (209 lb)	21 March 1995 (aged 26)	(Switzerland) HC Lugano
36	G	Joren van Pottelberghe	1.91 m (6 ft 3 in)	85 kg (187 lb)	5 June 1997 (aged 24)	(Switzerland) EHC Biel
45	D	Michael Fora	1.92 m (6 ft 4 in)	98 kg (216 lb)	30 October 1995 (aged 26)	(Switzerland) HC Ambrì-Piotta
54	D	Christian Marti	1.91 m (6 ft 3 in)	97 kg (214 lb)	29 March 1993 (aged 28)	(Switzerland) ZSC Lions
55	D	Romain Loeffel	1.78 m (5 ft 10 in)	85 kg (187 lb)	10 March 1991 (aged 30)	(Switzerland) HC Lugano
58	F	Dario Simion	1.90 m (6 ft 3 in)	87 kg (192 lb)	22 May 1994 (aged 27)	(Switzerland) EV Zug
61	F	Fabrice Herzog	1.89 m (6 ft 2 in)	89 kg (196 lb)	9 December 1994 (aged 27)	(Switzerland) EV Zug
62	F	Denis Malgin	1.75 m (5 ft 9 in)	80 kg (180 lb)	18 January 1997 (aged 25)	(Switzerland) ZSC Lions
63	G	Leonardo Genoni	1.82 m (6 ft 0 in)	87 kg (192 lb)	28 August 1987 (aged 34)	(Switzerland) EV Zug
65	D	Ramon Untersander (A)	1.84 m (6 ft 0 in)	87 kg (192 lb)	21 January 1991 (aged 31)	(Switzerland) SC Bern
70	F	Denis Hollenstein	1.83 m (6 ft 0 in)	88 kg (194 lb)	15 October 1989 (aged 32)	(Switzerland) ZSC Lions
71	F	Enzo Corvi	1.83 m (6 ft 0 in)	86 kg (190 lb)	23 December 1992 (aged 29)	(Switzerland) HC Davos
82	F	Simon Moser (A)	1.87 m (6 ft 2 in)	97 kg (214 lb)	10 March 1989 (aged 32)	(Switzerland) SC Bern
83	F	Joël Vermin	1.80 m (5 ft 11 in)	87 kg (192 lb)	5 February 1992 (aged 30)	(Switzerland) Genève-Servette HC
85	F	Sven Andrighetto	1.78 m (5 ft 10 in)	85 kg (187 lb)	21 March 1993 (aged 28)	(Switzerland) ZSC Lions
87	F	Killian Mottet	1.77 m (5 ft 10 in)	76 kg (168 lb)	15 January 1991 (aged 31)	(Switzerland) HC Fribourg-Gottéron
88	F	Christoph Bertschy	1.78 m (5 ft 10 in)	84 kg (185 lb)	5 April 1994 (aged 27)	(Switzerland) Lausanne HC
92	F	Gaëtan Haas	1.83 m (6 ft 0 in)	82 kg (181 lb)	31 January 1992 (aged 30)	(Switzerland) EHC Biel

Roman Josi, Timo Meier, and Nico Hischier were named to the Swiss roster on October 8, 2021 but did not participate due to the NHL's decision not to send players to the Olympics due to the COVID-19 pandemic.

== Group C ==
=== Finland ===
The roster was announced on 20 January 2022.

Head coach: Jukka Jalonen

No.	Pos.	Name	Height	Weight	Birthdate	Team
2	D	Ville Pokka	1.83 m (6 ft 0 in)	90 kg (200 lb)	3 June 1994 (aged 27)	(Russia) Avangard Omsk
3	D	Niklas Friman	1.89 m (6 ft 2 in)	94 kg (207 lb)	30 August 1993 (aged 28)	(Finland) Jokerit
4	D	Mikko Lehtonen	1.82 m (6 ft 0 in)	89 kg (196 lb)	16 January 1994 (aged 28)	(Russia) SKA Saint Petersburg
12	F	Marko Anttila	2.03 m (6 ft 8 in)	108 kg (238 lb)	27 May 1985 (aged 36)	(Finland) Jokerit
13	D	Valtteri Kemiläinen	1.84 m (6 ft 0 in)	88 kg (194 lb)	16 December 1991 (aged 30)	(Russia) HC Vityaz
15	F	Miro Aaltonen	1.80 m (5 ft 11 in)	84 kg (185 lb)	7 June 1993 (aged 28)	(Russia) HC Vityaz
20	F	Niko Ojamäki	1.80 m (5 ft 11 in)	84 kg (185 lb)	17 June 1995 (aged 26)	(Russia) HC Vityaz
24	F	Hannes Björninen	1.85 m (6 ft 1 in)	89 kg (196 lb)	19 October 1995 (aged 26)	(Finland) Jokerit
25	F	Toni Rajala	1.79 m (5 ft 10 in)	76 kg (168 lb)	29 March 1991 (aged 30)	(Switzerland) EHC Biel
28	F	Joonas Nättinen	1.89 m (6 ft 2 in)	90 kg (200 lb)	3 January 1991 (aged 31)	(Russia) Severstal Cherepovets
29	G	Harri Säteri	1.86 m (6 ft 1 in)	90 kg (200 lb)	29 December 1989 (aged 32)	(Russia) HC Sibir Novosibirsk
35	G	Frans Tuohimaa	1.88 m (6 ft 2 in)	87 kg (192 lb)	19 August 1991 (aged 30)	(Russia) HC Neftekhimik Nizhnekamsk
38	D	Juuso Hietanen	1.78 m (5 ft 10 in)	83 kg (183 lb)	14 June 1985 (aged 36)	(Switzerland) HC Ambrì-Piotta
40	D	Petteri Lindbohm	1.90 m (6 ft 3 in)	93 kg (205 lb)	23 September 1993 (aged 28)	(Finland) Jokerit
42	D	Sami Vatanen	1.79 m (5 ft 10 in)	84 kg (185 lb)	3 June 1991 (aged 30)	(Switzerland) Genève-Servette HC
45	G	Juho Olkinuora	1.88 m (6 ft 2 in)	91 kg (201 lb)	4 November 1990 (aged 31)	(Russia) Metallurg Magnitogorsk
51	F	Valtteri Filppula (C)	1.82 m (6 ft 0 in)	86 kg (190 lb)	20 March 1984 (aged 37)	(Switzerland) Genève-Servette HC
55	D	Atte Ohtamaa (A)	1.88 m (6 ft 2 in)	92 kg (203 lb)	6 November 1987 (aged 34)	(Finland) Oulun Kärpät
60	F	Markus Granlund	1.80 m (5 ft 11 in)	85 kg (187 lb)	16 April 1993 (aged 28)	(Russia) Salavat Yulaev Ufa
65	F	Sakari Manninen	1.70 m (5 ft 7 in)	71 kg (157 lb)	10 February 1992 (aged 29)	(Russia) Salavat Yulaev Ufa
70	F	Teemu Hartikainen	1.86 m (6 ft 1 in)	91 kg (201 lb)	3 May 1990 (aged 31)	(Russia) Salavat Yulaev Ufa
71	F	Leo Komarov (A)	1.80 m (5 ft 11 in)	93 kg (205 lb)	23 January 1987 (aged 35)	(Russia) SKA Saint Petersburg
80	F	Saku Mäenalanen	1.92 m (6 ft 4 in)	94 kg (207 lb)	24 May 1994 (aged 27)	(Finland) Oulun Kärpät
81	F	Iiro Pakarinen	1.85 m (6 ft 1 in)	90 kg (200 lb)	25 August 1991 (aged 30)	(Finland) Jokerit
82	F	Harri Pesonen	1.80 m (5 ft 11 in)	88 kg (194 lb)	6 August 1988 (aged 33)	(Switzerland) SCL Tigers

Sebastian Aho, Aleksander Barkov, and Mikko Rantanen were named to the Finnish roster on October 7, 2021 but did not participate due to the NHL's decision not to send players to the Olympics due to the COVID-19 pandemic.

=== Latvia ===
The roster was announced on 24 January 2022.

Head coach: Harijs Vītoliņš

No.	Pos.	Name	Height	Weight	Birthdate	Team
9	F	Renārs Krastenbergs	183 cm (6 ft 0 in)	84 kg (185 lb)	26 December 1998 (aged 23)	(Austria) EC VSV
10	F	Lauris Dārziņš (C)	191 cm (6 ft 3 in)	91 kg (201 lb)	28 January 1985 (aged 37)	(Latvia) Dinamo Riga
14	F	Rihards Bukarts	178 cm (5 ft 10 in)	84 kg (185 lb)	31 December 1995 (aged 26)	(Russia) Admiral Vladivostok
15	F	Mārtiņš Karsums	178 cm (5 ft 10 in)	98 kg (216 lb)	26 February 1986 (aged 35)	(Latvia) Dinamo Riga
16	F	Kaspars Daugaviņš	183 cm (6 ft 0 in)	100 kg (220 lb)	18 May 1988 (aged 33)	(Switzerland) SC Bern
17	F	Mārtiņš Dzierkals	183 cm (6 ft 0 in)	84 kg (185 lb)	4 April 1997 (aged 24)	(Czech Republic) HC Škoda Plzeň
18	F	Rodrigo Ābols (A)	193 cm (6 ft 4 in)	85 kg (187 lb)	5 January 1996 (aged 26)	(Sweden) Örebro HK
23	D	Kārlis Čukste	193 cm (6 ft 4 in)	100 kg (220 lb)	17 June 1997 (aged 24)	(Latvia) Dinamo Riga
24	D	Patriks Ozols	180 cm (5 ft 11 in)	84 kg (185 lb)	2 February 2001 (aged 21)	(Latvia) Dinamo Riga
25	F	Andris Džeriņš	185 cm (6 ft 1 in)	87 kg (192 lb)	14 February 1988 (aged 33)	(Austria) Steinbach Black Wings 1992
26	D	Uvis Balinskis	178 cm (5 ft 10 in)	76 kg (168 lb)	1 August 1996 (aged 25)	(Czech Republic) HC Verva Litvínov
27	D	Oskars Cibuļskis (A)	188 cm (6 ft 2 in)	86 kg (190 lb)	9 April 1988 (aged 33)	(Latvia) Dinamo Riga
29	D	Ralfs Freibergs	180 cm (5 ft 11 in)	87 kg (192 lb)	17 May 1991 (aged 30)	(Latvia) Dinamo Riga
32	D	Artūrs Kulda	188 cm (6 ft 2 in)	98 kg (216 lb)	25 July 1988 (aged 33)	(Germany) Krefeld Pinguine
48	D	Nauris Sējējs	180 cm (5 ft 11 in)	84 kg (185 lb)	15 March 2001 (aged 20)	(Switzerland) HC La Chaux-de-Fonds
50	G	Kristers Gudļevskis	193 cm (6 ft 4 in)	89 kg (196 lb)	31 July 1992 (aged 29)	(Sweden) Brynäs IF
55	D	Roberts Mamčics	195 cm (6 ft 5 in)	105 kg (231 lb)	6 April 1995 (aged 26)	(Czech Republic) PSG Berani Zlín
69	F	Nikolajs Jeļisejevs	180 cm (5 ft 11 in)	86 kg (190 lb)	7 July 1994 (aged 27)	(Latvia) Dinamo Riga
70	F	Miks Indrašis	191 cm (6 ft 3 in)	85 kg (187 lb)	30 September 1990 (aged 31)	(Russia) Admiral Vladivostok
72	D	Jānis Jaks	185 cm (6 ft 1 in)	86 kg (190 lb)	22 August 1995 (aged 26)	(Russia) HC Sochi
73	F	Deniss Smirnovs	178 cm (5 ft 10 in)	82 kg (181 lb)	7 March 1999 (aged 22)	(Switzerland) Genève-Servette HC
74	G	Ivars Punnenovs	185 cm (6 ft 1 in)	85 kg (187 lb)	30 May 1994 (aged 27)	(Switzerland) SCL Tigers
77	D	Kristaps Zīle	185 cm (6 ft 1 in)	85 kg (187 lb)	24 December 1997 (aged 24)	(Latvia) Dinamo Riga
87	F	Gints Meija	185 cm (6 ft 1 in)	80 kg (180 lb)	4 September 1987 (aged 34)	(Latvia) Dinamo Riga
91	F	Ronalds Ķēniņš	183 cm (6 ft 0 in)	91 kg (201 lb)	28 February 1991 (aged 30)	(Switzerland) Lausanne HC
95	F	Oskars Batņa	195 cm (6 ft 5 in)	100 kg (220 lb)	7 May 1995 (aged 26)	(Finland) Mikkelin Jukurit
98	G	Jānis Kalniņš	183 cm (6 ft 0 in)	87 kg (192 lb)	13 December 1991 (aged 30)	(Sweden) Växjö Lakers HC

Rūdolfs Balcers, Zemgus Girgensons, and Kristiāns Rubīns were named to the Latvian roster on October 8, 2021 but did not participate due to the NHL's decision not to send players to the Olympics due to the COVID-19 pandemic.

=== Slovakia ===
The roster was announced on 18 January 2022.

Head coach: (Canada) Craig Ramsay

No.	Pos.	Name	Height	Weight	Birthdate	Team
5	D	Šimon Nemec	1.83 m (6 ft 0 in)	85 kg (187 lb)	15 February 2004 (aged 17)	(Slovakia) HK Nitra
12	F	Miloš Kelemen	1.88 m (6 ft 2 in)	96 kg (212 lb)	6 July 1999 (aged 22)	(Czech Republic) Mladá Boleslav
13	F	Tomáš Jurčo	1.88 m (6 ft 2 in)	85 kg (187 lb)	28 December 1992 (aged 29)	(Kazakhstan) Barys Nur-Sultan
14	D	Peter Čerešňák (A)	1.91 m (6 ft 3 in)	95 kg (209 lb)	26 January 1993 (aged 29)	(Czech Republic) HC Plzeň
19	F	Michal Krištof	1.75 m (5 ft 9 in)	74 kg (163 lb)	11 October 1993 (aged 28)	(Czech Republic) Kometa Brno
20	F	Juraj Slafkovský	1.92 m (6 ft 4 in)	99 kg (218 lb)	30 March 2004 (aged 17)	(Finland) HC TPS
22	D	Samuel Kňažko	1.86 m (6 ft 1 in)	87 kg (192 lb)	7 August 2002 (aged 19)	(United States) Seattle Thunderbirds
24	G	Patrik Rybár	1.90 m (6 ft 3 in)	86 kg (190 lb)	9 November 1993 (aged 28)	(Belarus) Dinamo Minsk
25	F	Peter Zuzin	1.82 m (6 ft 0 in)	81 kg (179 lb)	4 September 1990 (aged 31)	(Slovakia) HKM Zvolen
27	F	Marek Hrivík (C)	1.85 m (6 ft 1 in)	93 kg (205 lb)	28 August 1991 (aged 30)	(Russia) Torpedo Nizhny Novgorod
28	D	Martin Gernát	1.93 m (6 ft 4 in)	94 kg (207 lb)	11 April 1993 (aged 28)	(Switzerland) Lausanne HC
30	G	Matej Tomek	1.91 m (6 ft 3 in)	82 kg (181 lb)	24 May 1997 (aged 24)	(Czech Republic) Kometa Brno
34	F	Peter Cehlárik (A)	1.88 m (6 ft 2 in)	93 kg (205 lb)	2 August 1995 (aged 26)	(Russia) Avangard Omsk
40	F	Miloš Roman	1.81 m (5 ft 11 in)	87 kg (192 lb)	6 November 1999 (aged 22)	(Czech Republic) Oceláři Třinec
42	G	Branislav Konrád	1.88 m (6 ft 2 in)	88 kg (194 lb)	10 October 1987 (aged 34)	(Czech Republic) HC Olomouc
44	D	Mislav Rosandić	1.81 m (5 ft 11 in)	85 kg (187 lb)	26 January 1995 (aged 26)	(Czech Republic) Bílí Tygři Liberec
49	F	Samuel Takáč	1.84 m (6 ft 0 in)	92 kg (203 lb)	3 December 1991 (aged 30)	(Slovakia) Slovan Bratislava
52	D	Martin Marinčin	1.92 m (6 ft 4 in)	95 kg (209 lb)	18 February 1992 (aged 29)	(Czech Republic) Oceláři Třinec
56	F	Marko Daňo	1.82 m (6 ft 0 in)	96 kg (212 lb)	30 November 1994 (aged 27)	(Czech Republic) Oceláři Třinec
65	D	Michal Čajkovský	1.92 m (6 ft 4 in)	105 kg (231 lb)	6 May 1992 (aged 29)	(Russia) Sibir Novosibirsk
71	D	Marek Ďaloga	1.93 m (6 ft 4 in)	90 kg (200 lb)	10 March 1989 (aged 32)	(Czech Republic) Kometa Brno
79	F	Libor Hudáček	1.77 m (5 ft 10 in)	80 kg (180 lb)	7 September 1990 (aged 31)	(Belarus) Dinamo Minsk
87	F	Pavol Regenda	1.92 m (6 ft 4 in)	93 kg (205 lb)	7 December 1999 (aged 22)	(Slovakia) HK Dukla Michalovce
88	F	Kristián Pospíšil	1.87 m (6 ft 2 in)	88 kg (194 lb)	22 April 1996 (aged 25)	(Switzerland) HC Davos
89	F	Adrián Holešinský	1.82 m (6 ft 0 in)	85 kg (187 lb)	11 February 1996 (aged 25)	(Slovakia) HK Nitra

Andrej Sekera, Erik Černák, and Jaroslav Halák were named to the Slovak roster on October 8, 2021 but did not participate due to the NHL's decision not to send players to the Olympics due to the COVID-19 pandemic.

=== Sweden ===
The roster was announced on 21 January 2022.

Head coach: Johan Garpenlöv

No.	Pos.	Name	Height	Weight	Birthdate	Team
2	D	Christian Folin	1.91 m (6 ft 3 in)	93 kg (205 lb)	9 February 1991 (aged 31)	(Sweden) Frölunda HC
5	D	Oscar Fantenberg	1.84 m (6 ft 0 in)	93 kg (205 lb)	7 October 1991 (aged 30)	(Russia) SKA Saint Petersburg
7	D	Henrik Tömmernes (A)	1.86 m (6 ft 1 in)	84 kg (185 lb)	28 August 1990 (aged 31)	(Switzerland) Genève-Servette HC
8	F	Fredrik Olofsson	1.86 m (6 ft 1 in)	84 kg (185 lb)	27 May 1996 (aged 25)	(Sweden) IK Oskarshamn
12	F	Max Friberg	1.80 m (5 ft 11 in)	88 kg (194 lb)	20 November 1992 (aged 29)	(Sweden) Frölunda HC
15	F	Gustav Rydahl	1.91 m (6 ft 3 in)	91 kg (201 lb)	11 September 1994 (aged 27)	(Sweden) Färjestad BK
16	F	Marcus Krüger (A)	1.83 m (6 ft 0 in)	81 kg (179 lb)	27 May 1990 (aged 31)	(Switzerland) Zürich
18	F	Dennis Everberg	1.93 m (6 ft 4 in)	95 kg (209 lb)	31 December 1991 (aged 30)	(Sweden) Rögle BK
19	F	Pontus Holmberg	1.80 m (5 ft 11 in)	81 kg (179 lb)	9 March 1999 (aged 22)	(Sweden) Växjö Lakers
23	F	Lucas Wallmark	1.83 m (6 ft 0 in)	81 kg (179 lb)	5 September 1995 (aged 26)	(Russia) CSKA Moscow
27	F	Joakim Nordström	1.85 m (6 ft 1 in)	88 kg (194 lb)	25 February 1992 (aged 29)	(Russia) CSKA Moscow
31	G	Lars Johansson	1.85 m (6 ft 1 in)	90 kg (200 lb)	11 July 1987 (aged 34)	(Russia) SKA Saint Petersburg
32	D	Lukas Bengtsson	1.78 m (5 ft 10 in)	82 kg (181 lb)	14 April 1994 (aged 27)	(Belarus) Dinamo Minsk
33	D	Linus Hultström	1.79 m (5 ft 10 in)	89 kg (196 lb)	9 December 1992 (aged 29)	(Russia) Metallurg Magnitogorsk
34	F	Daniel Brodin	1.86 m (6 ft 1 in)	85 kg (187 lb)	9 February 1990 (aged 32)	(Switzerland) HC Fribourg-Gottéron
35	G	Magnus Hellberg	1.97 m (6 ft 6 in)	95 kg (209 lb)	4 April 1991 (aged 30)	(Russia) HC Sochi
39	G	Adam Reideborn	1.84 m (6 ft 0 in)	81 kg (179 lb)	18 January 1992 (aged 30)	(Russia) CSKA Moscow
48	F	Carl Klingberg	1.90 m (6 ft 3 in)	98 kg (216 lb)	28 January 1991 (aged 31)	(Switzerland) EV Zug
52	D	Philip Holm	1.86 m (6 ft 1 in)	86 kg (190 lb)	8 December 1991 (aged 30)	(Finland) Jokerit
58	F	Anton Lander (C)	1.82 m (6 ft 0 in)	87 kg (192 lb)	24 April 1991 (aged 30)	(Switzerland) EV Zug
59	F	Linus Johansson	1.90 m (6 ft 3 in)	90 kg (200 lb)	30 November 1992 (aged 29)	(Sweden) Färjestad BK
64	D	Jonathan Pudas	1.79 m (5 ft 10 in)	79 kg (174 lb)	26 April 1993 (aged 28)	(Sweden) Skellefteå AIK
81	D	Theodor Lennström	1.86 m (6 ft 1 in)	86 kg (190 lb)	8 August 1994 (aged 27)	(Russia) Torpedo Nizhny Novgorod
86	F	Mathias Bromé	1.82 m (6 ft 0 in)	83 kg (183 lb)	29 July 1994 (aged 27)	(Switzerland) HC Davos
95	F	Jacob de la Rose	1.89 m (6 ft 2 in)	95 kg (209 lb)	20 May 1995 (aged 26)	(Sweden) Färjestad BK

Victor Hedman, Mika Zibanejad, and Gabriel Landeskog were named to the Swedish team on October 5, 2021 but did not participate due to the NHL's decision not to send players to the Olympics due to the COVID-19 pandemic.
