= Patrik Rybár =

Slovak ice hockey player (born 1993)

- Born: 9 November 1993 (age 32) Skalica, Slovakia
- Height: 6 ft 3 in (191 cm)
- Weight: 190 lb (86 kg; 13 st 8 lb)
- Position: Goaltender
- Catches: Left
- Slovak Extraliga team Former teams: HC Slovan Bratislava; HK Orange 20; ŠHK 37 Piešťany; Mountfield HK; Grand Rapids Griffins; Oulun Kärpät; Dinamo Minsk; Spartak Moscow; Kunlun Red Star; Shanghai Dragons
- National team: Slovakia
- NHL draft: Undrafted
- Playing career: 2011–present

Patrik Rybár (born 9 November 1993) is a Slovak professional ice hockey goaltender for HC Slovan Bratislava in the Slovak Extraliga.

== Playing career ==
Rybár began his professional career for HC Slovan Bratislava of the Slovak Extraliga during the 2010–11 season, appearing in one game.

He has split his last four professional seasons between Slovakia and the Czech Republic, totaling a 47–26 record, 1.93 goals-against average (GAA), .927 save percentage, and nine shutouts in two seasons with Mountfield HK from 2016 to 2018, and posting a 3.07 GAA and .920 save percentage with ŠHK 37 Piešťany in the Slovak Extraliga from 2014 to 2016, including the Slovak Extraliga's top save percentage (.933) in 2015–16.

During the 2017–18 season, he posted a 23–13 record for Mountfield HK and led the league in both GAA (1.73) and shutouts (7), alongside a .932 save percentage. He helped his club reach the semifinals in the Extraliga playoffs, posting a 2.24 GAA and .918 save percentage in 12 playoff games.

On 21 May 2018, Rybár signed a one-year, entry-level contract with Detroit Red Wings of the National Hockey League. In the 2018–19 season, after participating in the Red Wings training camp Rybár was assigned to play exclusively with American Hockey League affiliate, the Grand Rapids Griffins. He collected 16 wins in 37 appearances with the Griffins.

At the conclusion of his contract, Rybár was tendered a qualifying offer by the Red Wings; however, he opted to return to Europe in agreeing to a one-year contract with Oulun Kärpät of the Finnish Liiga on 1 July 2019.

Leaving Finland after two seasons with Kärpät, Rybár was signed to a one-year contract with Belarusian-based club, HC Dinamo Minsk of the KHL, on 6 May 2021.

In the following season, Rybár would continue in the KHL, joining HC Spartak Moscow on a one-year contract on 23 June 2022.

In his third season with the club in 2024–25, Rybár was placed on waivers and was claimed off of waivers by Kunlun Red Star on 27 December 2024. After featuring in 15 games to complete the regular season, Rybár was re-signed by the newly rebranded Shanghai Dragons to a two-year contract extension on 15 August 2025.

Rybár signed a three year contract with HC Slovan Bratislava on 30 September 2026.

== International play ==
Medal record

Representing Slovakia

Ice hockey

Olympic Games
Bronze medal – third place	2022 Beijing	

Rybár was named to the Slovak Olympic team at the 2018 Winter Olympics but did not see game action. He also represented Slovakia at the 2018 IIHF World Championship, appearing in three games with a 1–1 record, 2.49 GAA, and .906 save percentage.

== Personal life ==
He is the son of former hockey player Pavol Rybár.
