= Lucas Wallmark =

Swedish ice hockey player (born 1995)

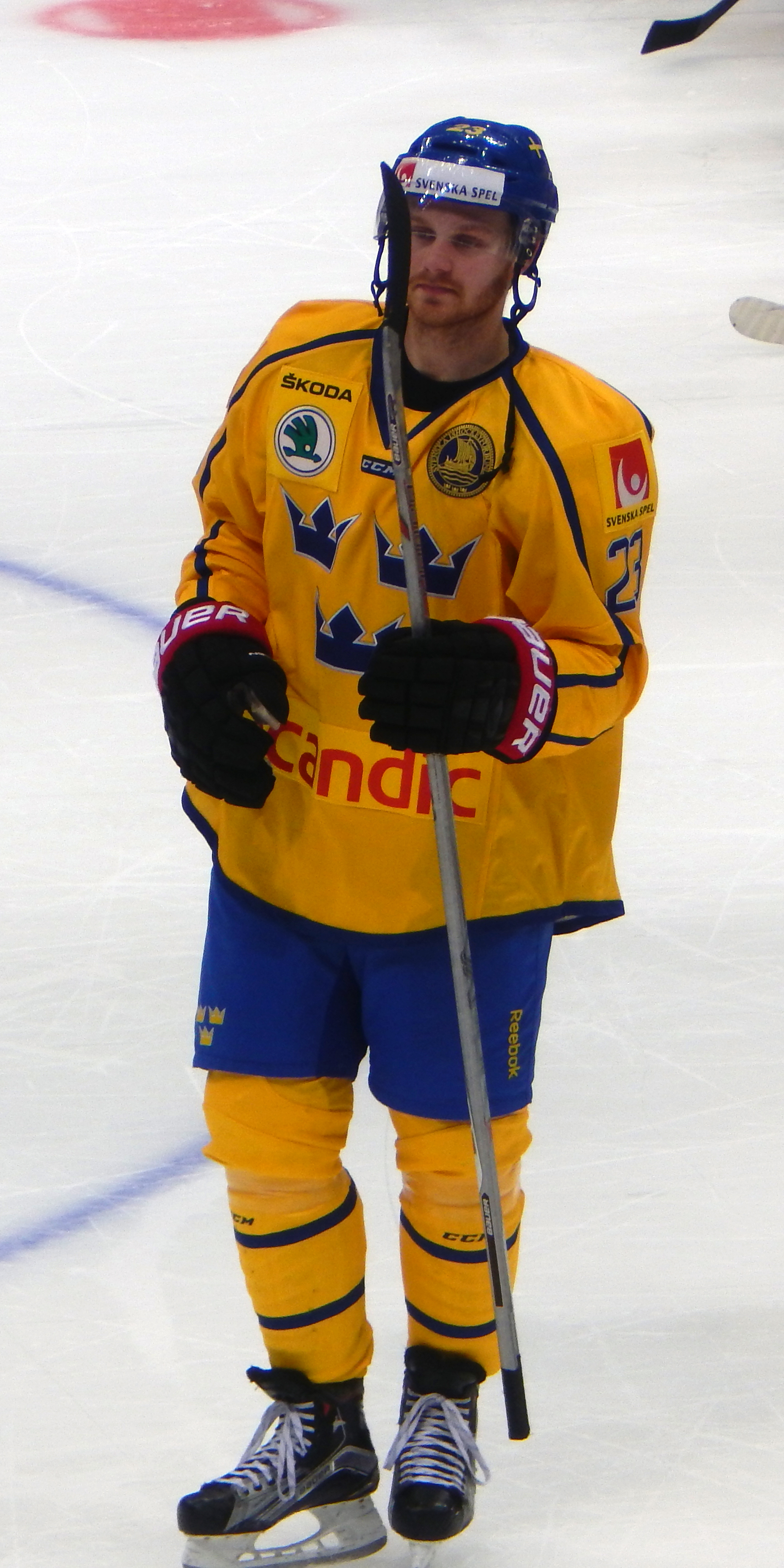
- Wallmark with Sweden in 2015
- Born: 5 September 1995 (age 30) Umeå, Sweden
- Height: 6 ft 0 in (183 cm)
- Weight: 176 lb (80 kg; 12 st 8 lb)
- Position: Centre
- Shoots: Left
- NL team Former teams: HC Fribourg-Gottéron; Skellefteå AIK; Luleå HF; Carolina Hurricanes; Florida Panthers; Chicago Blackhawks; CSKA Moscow; ZSC Lions
- National team: Sweden
- NHL draft: 97th overall, 2014; Carolina Hurricanes
- Playing career: 2013–present

Lucas Wallmark (born 5 September 1995) is a Swedish professional ice hockey center who is currently playing for HC Fribourg-Gottéron of the National League (NL). He was selected by the Carolina Hurricanes in the fourth round, 97th overall, at the 2014 NHL entry draft.

== Playing career ==
Wallmark made his Elitserien debut playing with Skellefteå AIK during the 2012–13 Elitserien season. He transferred to SHL rivals, Luleå HF, with which he spent three seasons the following year.

On 11 June 2015, Wallmark signed a three-year entry-level contract with the Carolina Hurricanes.

During the 2017–18 season, on 30 December 2017, Wallmark scored his first NHL goal with the Hurricanes in a game against the St. Louis Blues. He was reassigned to the Charlotte Checkers on 8 January 2018. Wallmark was named the Checkers' MVP following the team's elimination from the 2018 Calder Cup playoffs.

In the 2019–20 season, through 60 games, Wallmark established a career-high 11 goals before he was traded by the Hurricanes at the NHL trade deadline along with Erik Haula, Eetu Luostarinen and Chase Priskie to the Florida Panthers in exchange for Vincent Trocheck on 24 February 2020. He added one goal and an assist in 7 regular season games with the Panthers before the season was paused due to the COVID-19 pandemic. He returned in the qualifying rounds for the post-season, going scoreless in 2 games.

As an impending restricted free agent, Wallmark was not tendered a qualifying offer by the Panthers, ending his brief tenure with the club on 8 October 2020. As a free agent Wallmark signed a one-year, $950,000 contract with the Chicago Blackhawks on 12 October 2020.

During the pandemic delayed 2020–21 season, Wallmark struggled to find his role with the Blackhawks, posting just three assists through 16 games before he was placed on waivers and assigned to the taxi squad on 6 April 2021. Wallmark was then traded once again to the Florida Panthers on 8 April 2021, along with Lucas Carlsson in exchange for Brett Connolly, Riley Stillman, the rights to former first-round pick Henrik Borgström and a 7th-round pick in the 2021 NHL entry draft. Wallmark went scoreless in 4 regular season games in his return with the Panthers, remaining primarily on the club's taxi squad through the playoffs.

As an impending free agent, Wallmark left the NHL in signing a one-year contract with Russian outfit HC CSKA Moscow of the Kontinental Hockey League (KHL) on 15 June 2021. In the 2021–22 season, Wallmark seamlessly adapted to the KHL in registering eight goals and 19 points through 31 regular season games.

He made two playoff appearances before terminating his contract with CSKA on 4 March 2022 due to the Russian invasion of Ukraine.

As a free agent in the off-season, Wallmark was later signed to a three-year contract with Swiss club, ZSC Lions of the NL, on 16 May 2022.

On 28 December 2022, ZSC Lions replaces his coach, Rikard Grönborg with Marc Crawford. Wallmark cannot adapt to his new coach's playing system and decides to terminate his contract on 3 May 2023. The next day, he signs a two-year contract with HC Fribourg-Gottéron.

== Career statistics ==
=== Regular season and playoffs ===
			Regular season					Playoffs
Season	Team	League	GP	G	A	Pts	PIM	GP	G	A	Pts	PIM
2009–10	Tegs SK Hockey	J18	16	3	6	9	37	—	—	—	—	—
2009–10	IF Björklöven	J18 Allsv	10	1	3	4	0	—	—	—	—	—
2010–11	Skellefteå AIK	J18	20	14	25	39	6	—	—	—	—	—
2010–11	Skellefteå AIK	J18 Allsv	16	4	24	28	12	2	1	0	1	0
2011–12	Skellefteå AIK	J18 Allsv	2	1	1	2	0	3	3	2	5	2
2011–12	Skellefteå AIK	J20	37	11	26	37	14	3	1	2	3	4
2012–13	Skellefteå AIK	J20	14	5	11	16	18	—	—	—	—	—
2012–13	Skellefteå AIK	SEL	2	0	0	0	0	—	—	—	—	—
2012–13	Karlskrona HK	Allsv	16	5	5	10	4	—	—	—	—	—
2013–14	Luleå HF	SHL	41	3	7	10	2	1	0	0	0	0
2013–14	Asplöven HC	Allsv	11	1	7	8	6	—	—	—	—	—
2014–15	Luleå HF	SHL	50	5	13	18	14	9	0	5	5	2
2015–16	Luleå HF	SHL	48	8	24	32	20	11	7	2	9	4
2016–17	Charlotte Checkers	AHL	67	24	22	46	28	5	3	3	6	2
2016–17	Carolina Hurricanes	NHL	8	0	2	2	2	—	—	—	—	—
2017–18	Charlotte Checkers	AHL	45	17	38	55	16	8	3	2	5	4
2017–18	Carolina Hurricanes	NHL	11	1	0	1	2	—	—	—	—	—
2018–19	Carolina Hurricanes	NHL	81	10	18	28	36	15	1	4	5	6
2019–20	Carolina Hurricanes	NHL	60	11	12	23	18	—	—	—	—	—
2019–20	Florida Panthers	NHL	7	1	1	2	0	2	0	0	0	2
2020–21	Chicago Blackhawks	NHL	16	0	3	3	6	—	—	—	—	—
2020–21	Florida Panthers	NHL	4	0	0	0	0	—	—	—	—	—
2021–22	CSKA Moscow	KHL	31	8	11	19	18	2	0	0	0	0
2022–23	ZSC Lions	NL	50	10	27	37	30	7	0	1	1	2
SHL totals			141	16	44	60	36	21	7	7	14	6
NHL totals			187	23	36	59	64	17	1	4	5	8
KHL totals			31	8	11	19	18	2	0	0	0	0
NL totals			50	10	27	37	30	7	0	1	1	2

=== International ===
Year	Team	Event	Result	GP	G	A	Pts	PIM
2011	Sweden	IH18	2nd place, silver medalist(s)	5	0	1	1	0
2012	Sweden	IH18	3rd place, bronze medalist(s)	5	4	3	7	2
2013	Sweden	WJC18	5th	5	2	3	5	2
2014	Sweden	WJC	2nd place, silver medalist(s)	7	3	5	8	2
2015	Sweden	WJC	4th	7	4	2	6	8
2022	Sweden	OG	4th	6	5	0	5	10
2022	Sweden	WC	6th	6	1	3	4	0
Junior totals				29	13	14	27	14
Senior totals				12	6	3	9	10
