= Sam Hentges (ice hockey) =

American ice hockey player (born 1999)

- Born: July 26, 1999 (age 27) Fridley, Minnesota, USA
- Height: 6 ft 0 in (183 cm)
- Weight: 175 lb (79 kg; 12 st 7 lb)
- Position: Right wing
- Shot: Right
- Played for: Iowa Wild
- National team: United States
- NHL draft: 210th overall, 2018; Minnesota Wild
- Playing career: 2022–2024

Samuel Hentges (born July 26, 1999) is an American former professional ice hockey right wing. He most recently played with the Iowa Wild in the American Hockey League (AHL) as a prospect under contract to the Minnesota Wild of the National Hockey League (NHL). He was a member of United States national team at the 2022 Winter Olympics.

== Playing career ==
Hentges was a star forward for his high school team, Totino-Grace High School, averaging more than two points per game as a senior. He was less effective during his only season of junior hockey, which was split between two teams, but was still thought of well enough for the Minnesota Wild to select him in the NHL Draft. The following year, he debuted for St. Cloud State. While providing secondary scoring for the Huskies, he helped the team finish atop the NCHC standings. While the team lost in the conference championship game, they still received the top overall seed and were set against the lowest-ranked team for their first game in the NCAA Tournament. Hentges couldn't stop one of the more stunning upsets in NCAA history when St. Cloud State fell to American International, 1–2.

Hentges increased his standing on the Huskies during his sophomore season, though the team wasn't nearly as dominant. St. Cloud finished 5th in the conference; however, before their postseason began, the entire college hockey season was ended prematurely due to the COVID-19 pandemic. After the start of the following season was delayed for the same reason, Hentges didn't get off to a great start offensively. He did, however, help lead the team through an uncertain season and finish 2nd in the NCHC. After finishing as the NCHC runner-up, St. Cloud received a second seed and made up for their dismal performance in 2019 by reaching their first championship game. Hentges only recorded a single assist in the four games.

For his senior season, Hentges missed the first two months with upper- and lower-body injuries. His first game action came on the final day of the year and, even after the NHL announced that they wouldn't be sending any players to the Winter Olympics, Hentges didn't think he had a chance to make the team. However, after his head coach, Brett Larson, was named as an assistant coach for the United States national team, Hentges was invited to join the squad. He played in two games while the team finished in a disappointing 5th place.

After completing his collegiate career, Hentges was signed to a two-year, entry-level contract with the Minnesota Wild on March 29, 2022.

He retired after the 2023-24 season, after missing the entirety of the season.

== Career statistics ==
=== Regular season and playoffs ===
			Regular season					Playoffs
Season	Team	League	GP	G	A	Pts	PIM	GP	G	A	Pts	PIM
2017–18	Des Moines Buccaneers	USHL	16	4	8	12	25	—	—	—	—	—
2017–18	Tri-City Storm	USHL	7	4	2	6	8	—	—	—	—	—
2018–19	St. Cloud State	NCHC	37	10	10	20	24	—	—	—	—	—
2019–20	St. Cloud State	NCHC	28	7	17	24	20	—	—	—	—	—
2020–21	St. Cloud State	NCHC	29	8	9	17	14	—	—	—	—	—
2021–22	St. Cloud State	NCHC	20	12	10	22	19	—	—	—	—	—
2022–23	Iowa Wild	AHL	19	1	2	3	6	—	—	—	—	—
AHL totals			19	1	2	3	6	—	—	—	—	—

=== International ===
Year	Team	Event	Result	GP	G	A	Pts	PIM
2022	United States	OG	5th	2	1	0	1	0
Senior totals				2	1	0	1	0
