= Ice hockey at the 2022 Winter Olympics – Men's tournament =

2022 Winter Olympics

Tournament details
- Host country: China
- Venue(s): Beijing National Indoor Stadium; Wukesong Arena
- Dates: 9–20 February 2022
- Teams: 12

Final positions
- Champions: Finland (1st title)
- Runners-up: ROC
- Third place: Slovakia
- Fourth place: Sweden

Tournament statistics
- Games played: 30
- Goals scored: 152 (5.07 per game)
- Attendance: 27,437 (915 per game)
- Scoring leader: (Slovakia) Juraj Slafkovský (7 points)

Awards
- MVP: (Slovakia) Juraj Slafkovský

The men's tournament in ice hockey at the 2022 Winter Olympics took place in Beijing, China between 9 and 20 February 2022. Twelve countries qualified for the tournament; eight of them did so automatically by virtue of their ranking by the International Ice Hockey Federation, one, China, automatically qualified as hosts, while the three others took part in a qualification tournament.

The Olympic Athletes from Russia team won the gold medal in 2018. The Russian Olympic Committee, representing Russia at the 2022 Games, were thus the defending champions.

Finland won its first-ever ice hockey Olympic gold medal after going undefeated and beating the Russian Olympic Committee in the final.

Slovakia claimed its first-ever ice hockey medal at the Olympics after defeating Sweden 4–0 and finishing third.

For the first time in history, the Czech Republic did not qualify for the quarterfinals and finished in ninth place, their worst placement in history.

== Venues ==
Beijing National Indoor Stadium Capacity: 19,418	Wukesong Arena Capacity: 15,384
Beijing National Indoor Stadium	Cadillac Arena
Beijing	Beijing

== Qualified teams ==
Event	Date	Location	Vacancies	Qualified
Hosts	17 May 2018	(Denmark) Copenhagen	1	China
2019 IIHF World Ranking	31 March 2016 – 26 May 2019	(Slovakia) Bratislava and Košice	8	Canada; ROC; Finland; Sweden; Czech Republic; United States; Germany; Switzerland
Final qualification tournaments	26–29 August 2021	(Slovakia) Bratislava	1	Slovakia
Final qualification tournaments	26–29 August 2021	(Latvia) Riga	1	Latvia
Final qualification tournaments	26–29 August 2021	(Norway) Oslo	1	Denmark
Total			12	

Notes

1. ^{a} 2019 IIHF World Ranking were comprising the following events: 2016 World Championship, 2017 World Championship, 2018 Winter Olympic Games, 2018 World Championship and 2019 World Championship
2. ^{b} Bratislava and Košice were the sites for 2019 IIHF World Championship; at the conclusion of the tournament the ranking were finalized with regards to the qualification slots.

== Format ==
The twelve teams were split into three groups of four teams each, in which they played against each team once. The top team of each group and the best second-ranked team advanced to the quarterfinals, while all other teams played a qualification round. A knockout system was used after the group stage.

== Rosters ==
Due to the lack of ice hockey talent in China, players had to be recruited from abroad. The Chinese men's hockey team was composed of eleven Canadians, six Chinese, seven Americans, and a Russian. Neither the Chinese Olympic Committee, International Ice Hockey Federation nor the IOC commented on how it was possible for foreign players to compete for China, as the Olympic Charter requires competitors to be citizens of the country they represent. According to the nationality law of China, anyone who were naturalized as Chinese citizens, or those who resumed their Chinese nationality, must renounce all the other nationalities, as China does not recognize dual-nationality. The IOC Executive Board has the authority to make certain exceptions of a "general or individual nature", though it is unclear whether this was the case. When asked whether he had naturalized as a Chinese citizen, athlete Jake Chelios refused to comment, though he confirmed that he still has his American passport.

=== NHL participation ===
On 10 July 2020, the National Hockey League Players' Association (NHLPA) and National Hockey League agreed to a renewed collective bargaining agreement, which includes a provision opening the possibility for the NHL to explore participation at the 2022 and 2026 Winter Olympics. On 22 July 2021, the NHL released a 2021–22 schedule that included an Olympic break, but the league also announced that a final agreement had not yet been reached regarding Olympic participation of NHL players in 2022. On 3 September 2021, an agreement was made to allow NHL players to compete.

On 22 December 2021, the NHL and the NHLPA announced that NHL players would not be participating in the men's ice hockey tournament at the 2022 Games. COVID-19 had forced a change in the NHL schedule; with approximately 50 games postponed, the NHL was to use the Olympic break to make up its own postponed games rather than have the players compete in the Olympics.

== Officials ==
15 referees and 12 linesmen were selected for the tournament.

Referees

- (Belarus) Maxim Sidorenko
- (Canada) Michael Campbell
- (Canada) Oliver Gouin
- (Czech Republic) Martin Fraňo
- (Finland) Mikko Kaukokari
- (Finland) Kristian Vikman
- (Germany) André Schrader
- (Latvia) Andris Ansons
- (Russia) Roman Gofman
- (Russia) Evgenii Romasko
- (Sweden) Tobias Björk
- (Sweden) Mikael Nord
- (Switzerland) Michael Tscherrig
- (United States) Andrew Bruggeman
- (United States) Stephen Reneau

Linesmen

- (Canada) Dustin McCrank
- (Czech Republic) Daniel Hynek
- (Czech Republic) Jiří Ondráček
- (Finland) Lauri Nikulainen
- (Russia) Gleb Lazarev
- (Russia) Nikita Shalagin
- (Russia) Dmitry Shishlo
- (Sweden) Ludvig Lundgren
- (Sweden) Andreas Malmqvist
- (Switzerland) David Obwegeser
- (United States) William Hancock
- (United States) Brian Oliver

== Preliminary round ==
All times are local (UTC+8).

=== Tiebreak criteria ===
In each group, teams were ranked according to the following criteria:

1. Number of points (three points for a regulation-time win, two points for an overtime or shootout win, one point for an overtime or shootout defeat, no points for a regulation-time defeat);
2. In case two teams were tied on points, the result of their head-to-head game determined the ranking;
3. In case three or four teams were tied on points, the following criteria applied (if, after applying a criterion, only two teams remained tied, the result of their head-to-head game determined their ranking):
  1. Points obtained in head-to-head games between the teams concerned;
  2. Goal differential in head-to-head games between the teams concerned;
  3. Number of goals scored in head-to-head games between the teams concerned;
  4. If three teams remained tied, result of head-to-head games between each of the teams concerned and the remaining team in the group (points, goal difference, goals scored);
  5. Pre-tournament seeding, which is the 2019 IIHF World Ranking.

=== Group A ===
Pos	Team	Pld	W	OTW	OTL	L	GF	GA	GD	Pts	Qualification
1	United States	3	3	0	0	0	15	4	+11	9	Quarterfinals
2	Canada	3	2	0	0	1	12	5	+7	6	Playoffs
3	Germany	3	1	0	0	2	6	10	−4	3	Playoffs
4	China (H)	3	0	0	0	3	2	16	−14	0	Playoffs

Source: IIHF
Rules for classification: Preliminary round tiebreakers
(H) Host

February 10, 2022; 21:10 v	United States	8–0 (1–0, 3–0, 4–0)	China	Beijing National Indoor Stadium, Beijing; Attendance: 947

Game reference

Drew Commesso
Goalies
Jeremy Smith
Referees:
(Finland) Mikko Kaukokari
(Switzerland) Michael Tscherrig
Linesmen:
(Finland) Lauri Nikulainen
(Russia) Dmitri Shishlo

Brisson (Knies) (PP) – 10:38	1–0
Cates (Farrell, Meyers) – 25:32	2–0
O'Neill (Miele, Faber) – 31:13	3–0
Farrell (Abruzzese) – 38:07	4–0
Farrell (Kampfer, Meyers) – 41:06	5–0
Meyers (Farrell) – 50:19	6–0
Beniers (Abruzzese, Cooper) – 52:00	7–0
Farrell (Abdelkader, Helleson) (PP) – 58:27	8–0

10 min
Penalties
10 min
55
Shots
29

February 10, 2022; 21:10 v	Canada	5–1 (3–0, 1–1, 1–0)	Germany	Wukesong Arena, Beijing; Attendance: 685

Game reference

Edward Pasquale
Goalies
Mathias Niederberger
Referees:
(Sweden) Tobias Björk
(United States) Andrew Bruggeman
Linesmen:
(Czech Republic) Daniel Hynek
(Russia) Gleb Lazarev

Grant (Johnson, Street) – 04:43	1–0
Street (O'Dell, Johnson) – 09:47	2–0
Winnik (Cracknell, Desharnais) – 10:19	3–0
	3–1	30:45 – Rieder (Pföderl)
Noreau (O'Dell, Staal) (PP) – 32:58	4–1
Weal (Tambellini, Knight) – 51:22	5–1

8 min
Penalties
4 min
27
Shots
24

February 12, 2022; 12:10 v	Canada	2–4 (1–2, 1–1, 0–1)	United States	Beijing National Indoor Stadium, Beijing; Attendance: 948

Game reference

Edward Pasquale
Goalies
Strauss Mann
Referees:
(Latvia) Andris Ansons
(Sweden) Tobias Björk
Linesmen:
(Czech Republic) Daniel Hynek
(Canada) Dustin McCrank

Robinson (Ho-Sang, Staal) – 01:24	1–0
	1–1	02:34 – Miele (O'Neill, Kampfer)
	1–2	18:44 – Meyers (Farrell, Sanderson)
	1–3	22:37 – Brisson (Shore)
Knight (Winnik) (SH) – 34:13	2–3
	2–4	46:13 – Agostino (Miele)

4 min
Penalties
6 min
37
Shots
27

February 12, 2022; 16:40 v	Germany	3–2 (2–0, 1–1, 0–1)	China	Beijing National Indoor Stadium, Beijing; Attendance: 804

Game reference

Mathias Niederberger
Goalies
Jeremy Smith
Referees:
(United States) Stephen Reneau
(Belarus) Maxim Sidorenko
Linesmen:
(United States) Brian Oliver
(Czech Republic) Jiří Ondráček

Brandt – 13:33	1–0
Holzer (Kahun) – 16:24	2–0
Kahun (Müller, Rieder) – 24:41	3–0
	3–1	39:14 – Foo (Chelios, Sproul)
	3–2	49:00 – Wong (Yip, Sproul) (PP)

12 min
Penalties
6 min
38
Shots
16

February 13, 2022; 21:10 v	China	0–5 (0–3, 0–1, 0–1)	Canada	Beijing National Indoor Stadium, Beijing; Attendance: 904

Game reference

Paris O'Brien
Goalies
Matt Tomkins
Referees:
(Latvia) Andris Ansons
(United States) Andrew Bruggeman
Linesmen:
(Czech Republic) Daniel Hynek
(Russia) Gleb Lazarev

0–1	02:09 – Street (Johnson, O'Dell)
0–2	06:44 – Tambellini (Grant, Wotherspoon)
0–3	10:06 – O'Dell (Ho-Sang, Wotherspoon)
0–4	38:03 – Johnson (Demers, Weal)
0–5	46:23 – Knight (Power, Ho-Sang) (PP)

10 min
Penalties
10 min
26
Shots
44

February 13, 2022; 21:10 v	United States	3–2 (1–1, 1–0, 1–1)	Germany	Wukesong Arena, Beijing; Attendance: 708

Game reference

Drew Commesso
Goalies
Danny aus den Birken
Referees:
(Russia) Evgenii Romasko
(Belarus) Maxim Sidorenko
Linesmen:
(Switzerland) David Obwegeser
(Czech Republic) Jiří Ondráček

	0–1	02:00 – Hager (Plachta, Kahun) (PP)
Kampfer (Miele, O'Neill) (PP) – 04:26	1–1
Knies (Abruzzese, Ness) – 24:50	2–1
Smith – 42:47	3–1
	3–2	57:31 – Kühnhackl (Bergmann, Müller)

12 min
Penalties
10 min
32
Shots
26

=== Group B ===
Pos	Team	Pld	W	OTW	OTL	L	GF	GA	GD	Pts	Qualification
1	ROC	3	2	0	1	0	8	6	+2	7	Quarterfinals
2	Denmark	3	2	0	0	1	7	6	+1	6	Playoffs
3	Czech Republic	3	0	2	0	1	9	8	+1	4	Playoffs
4	Switzerland	3	0	0	1	2	4	8	−4	1	Playoffs

Source: IIHF

February 9, 2022; 16:40 v	ROC	1–0 (1–0, 0–0, 0–0)	Switzerland	Beijing National Indoor Stadium, Beijing; Attendance: 934

Game reference
Ivan Fedotov	Goalies	Reto Berra	Referees: (Germany) André Schrader (Belarus) Maxim Sidorenko; Linesmen: (United States) Brian Oliver (Czech Republic) Jiří Ondráček
Slepyshev (Semyonov) – 19:57 / 1–0			Referees: (Germany) André Schrader (Belarus) Maxim Sidorenko; Linesmen: (United States) Brian Oliver (Czech Republic) Jiří Ondráček
14 min	Penalties	10 min	Referees: (Germany) André Schrader (Belarus) Maxim Sidorenko; Linesmen: (United States) Brian Oliver (Czech Republic) Jiří Ondráček
30	Shots	33	Referees: (Germany) André Schrader (Belarus) Maxim Sidorenko; Linesmen: (United States) Brian Oliver (Czech Republic) Jiří Ondráček

February 9, 2022; 21:10 v	Czech Republic	1–2 (0–2, 1–0, 0–0)	Denmark	Beijing National Indoor Stadium, Beijing; Attendance: 891

Game reference

Šimon Hrubec
Goalies
Sebastian Dahm
Referees:
(Canada) Oliver Gouin
(Switzerland) Michael Tscherrig
Linesmen:
(Sweden) Ludvig Lundgren
(Finland) Lauri Nikulainen

	0–1	11:21 – Lauridsen
	0–2	17:23 – Nielsen (PS)
Červenka (Kovář) – 23:45	1–2

2 min
Penalties
6 min
40
Shots
17

February 11, 2022; 12:10 v	Denmark	0–2 (0–0, 0–1, 0–1)	ROC	Beijing National Indoor Stadium, Beijing; Attendance: 907

Game reference
Frederik Dichow	Goalies	Ivan Fedotov	Referees: (Canada) Michael Campbell (Czech Republic) Martin Fraňo; Linesmen: (United States) William Hancock (Sweden) Andreas Malmqvist
0–1 / 28:18 – Karnaukhov (Slepyshev, Voronkov); 0–2 / 59:54 – Semyonov (ENG)			Referees: (Canada) Michael Campbell (Czech Republic) Martin Fraňo; Linesmen: (United States) William Hancock (Sweden) Andreas Malmqvist
10 min	Penalties	2 min	Referees: (Canada) Michael Campbell (Czech Republic) Martin Fraňo; Linesmen: (United States) William Hancock (Sweden) Andreas Malmqvist
16	Shots	33	Referees: (Canada) Michael Campbell (Czech Republic) Martin Fraňo; Linesmen: (United States) William Hancock (Sweden) Andreas Malmqvist

February 11, 2022; 16:40 v	Czech Republic	2–1 GWS (1–1, 0–0, 0–0) (OT: 0–0) (SO: 1–0)	Switzerland	Beijing National Indoor Stadium, Beijing; Attendance: 834

Game reference
Šimon Hrubec	Goalies	Leonardo Genoni	Referees: (Latvia) Andris Ansons (United States) Andrew Bruggeman; Linesmen: (Russia) Gleb Lazarev (Canada) Dustin McCrank
Smejkal (Klok, Zohorna) – 04:33 / 1–0; / 1–1 / 08:34 – Haas (Andrighetto) (PP)			Referees: (Latvia) Andris Ansons (United States) Andrew Bruggeman; Linesmen: (Russia) Gleb Lazarev (Canada) Dustin McCrank
Krejčí; Sedlák (miss); Kovář (miss); Řepík (miss)	Shootout	(miss) Ambühl; (miss) Andrighetto; (miss) Corvi; (miss) Bertschy; (miss) Haas	Referees: (Latvia) Andris Ansons (United States) Andrew Bruggeman; Linesmen: (Russia) Gleb Lazarev (Canada) Dustin McCrank
10 min	Penalties	4 min	Referees: (Latvia) Andris Ansons (United States) Andrew Bruggeman; Linesmen: (Russia) Gleb Lazarev (Canada) Dustin McCrank
36	Shots	25	Referees: (Latvia) Andris Ansons (United States) Andrew Bruggeman; Linesmen: (Russia) Gleb Lazarev (Canada) Dustin McCrank

February 12, 2022; 21:10 v	ROC	5–6 OT (1–1, 1–2, 3–2) (OT: 0–1)	Czech Republic	Beijing National Indoor Stadium, Beijing; Attendance: 921

Game reference

Ivan Fedotov
Goalies
Šimon Hrubec
Referees:
(Finland) Mikko Kaukokari
(Sweden) Mikael Nord
Linesmen:
(Sweden) Ludvig Lundgren
(Finland) Lauri Nikulainen

Tkachyov (Gusev, Nesterov) – 04:51	1–0
	1–1	12:37 – Kundrátek (Červenka, Stránský) (PP)
Nesterov (Gusev, Plotnikov) (PP) – 32:19	2–1
	2–2	38:41 – Krejčí (Červenka, Kundrátek) (PP)
	2–3	39:16 – Špaček (Šulák, Sobotka) (PP)
	2–4	43:14 – Klok (T. Zohorna, H. Zohorna)
Semyonov (Plotnikov, Andronov) – 43:50	3–4
Gritsyuk (Gusev, Tkachyov) – 46:43	4–4
Chibisov (Voynov, Shipachyov) – 48:22	5–4
	5–5	48:57 – Hyka (Sedlák, Krejčí)
	5–6	64:29 – Šulák (Krejčí) (PP)

33 min
Penalties
10 min
29
Shots
41

February 12, 2022; 21:10 v	Switzerland	3–5 (1–0, 0–3, 2–2)	Denmark	Wukesong Arena, Beijing; Attendance: 620

Game reference

Reto Berra
Goalies
Sebastian Dahm
Referees:
(Russia) Roman Gofman
(Finland) Kristian Vikman
Linesmen:
(Sweden) Andreas Malmqvist
(Russia) Nikita Shalagin

Corvi (Weber, Thürkauf) – 15:59	1–0
	1–1	20:46 – Regin (Storm, Nick. Jensen) (PP)
	1–2	21:07 – Storm (Nich. Jensen, Russell)
	1–3	33:12 – Bødker (Russell, Lauridsen)
	1–4	41:55 – Meyer (Nich. Jensen, Jakobsen)
Loeffel (Untersander, Corvi) (PP) – 44:53	2–4
Herzog (Corvi, Untersander) (EA) – 57:37	3–4
	3–5	59:01 – Storm (Russell) (ENG)

14 min
Penalties
6 min
31
Shots
30

=== Group C ===
Pos	Team	Pld	W	OTW	OTL	L	GF	GA	GD	Pts	Qualification
1	Finland	3	2	1	0	0	13	6	+7	8	Quarterfinals
2	Sweden	3	2	0	1	0	10	7	+3	7	Quarterfinals
3	Slovakia	3	1	0	0	2	8	12	−4	3	Playoffs
4	Latvia	3	0	0	0	3	5	11	−6	0	Playoffs

Source: IIHF
Rules for classification: Preliminary round tiebreakers

February 10, 2022; 12:10 v	Sweden	3–2 (1–0, 2–1, 0–1)	Latvia	Beijing National Indoor Stadium, Beijing; Attendance: 873

Game reference

Lars Johansson
Goalies
Ivars Punnenovs
Referees:
(Czech Republic) Martin Fraňo
(Finland) Kristian Vikman
Linesmen:
(United States) William Hancock
(Russia) Nikita Shalagin

Wallmark (Holmberg, Olofsson) – 09:42	1–0
Lander (Bromé, Klingberg) – 20:30	2–0
Wallmark (Tömmernes, Pudas) (PP) – 33:39	3–0
	3–1	36:07 – Krastenbergs (Balinskis, Dārziņš) (PP)
	3–2	46:48 – Jeļisejevs (Dārziņš, Balinskis) (PP)

8 min
Penalties
10 min
26
Shots
17

February 10, 2022; 16:40 v	Finland	6–2 (3–1, 1–1, 2–0)	Slovakia	Beijing National Indoor Stadium, Beijing; Attendance: 929

Game reference

Harri Säteri
Goalies
Branislav Konrád
Referees:
(United States) Stephen Reneau
(Russia) Evgenii Romasko
Linesmen:
(Switzerland) David Obwegeser
(United States) Brian Oliver

	0–1	05:33 – Slafkovský (Roman)
Manninen (Hartikainen, Pokka) – 10:17	1–1
Pesonen (Aaltonen, Filppula) (PP) – 14:22	2–1
Aaltonen (Nättinen) – 18:20	3–1
Manninen (Granlund, Lehtonen) – 29:28	4–1
	4–2	31:49 – Slafkovský (Čerešňák, Regenda)
Manninen (Hartikainen) – 40:16	5–2
Aaltonen (Ojamäki, Vatanen) (PP) – 54:57	6–2

10 min
Penalties
6 min
30
Shots
33

February 11, 2022; 16:40 v	Sweden	4–1 (3–0, 0–0, 1–1)	Slovakia	Wukesong Arena, Beijing; Attendance: 653

Game reference

Magnus Hellberg
Goalies
Matej Tomek
Referees:
(Russia) Evgenii Romasko
(Germany) André Schrader
Linesmen:
(Switzerland) David Obwegeser
(United States) Brian Oliver

Nordström (Bengtsson, Friberg) – 11:22	1–0
Wallmark (Pudas, Tömmernes) (PP2) – 18:10	2–0
Friberg (Holm, Nordström) – 19:55	3–0
Klingberg (Lander, Bromé) (ENG) – 57:44	4–0
	4–1	58:18 – Slafkovský (Nemec)

12 min
Penalties
12 min
29
Shots
41

February 11, 2022; 21:10 v	Latvia	1–3 (0–0, 0–1, 1–2)	Finland	Wukesong Arena, Beijing; Attendance: 904

Game reference

Jānis Kalniņš
Goalies
Harri Säteri
Referees:
(Canada) Oliver Gouin
(Sweden) Mikael Nord
Linesmen:
(Sweden) Ludvig Lundgren
(Russia) Dmitry Shishlo

	0–1	37:59 – Kemiläinen (Lehtonen, Nättinen)
Ābols (Krastenbergs, Smirnovs) (PP) – 43:01	1–1
	1–2	54:42 – Komarov (Hietanen, Ohtamaa)
	1–3	58:43 – Anttila (Mäenalanen, Lindbohm)

6 min
Penalties
4 min
20
Shots
38

February 13, 2022; 12:10 v	Slovakia	5–2 (1–1, 2–0, 2–1)	Latvia	Beijing National Indoor Stadium, Beijing; Attendance: 943

Game reference

Patrik Rybár
Goalies
Jānis Kalniņš
Referees:
(Canada) Oliver Gouin
(Sweden) Mikael Nord
Linesmen:
(Sweden) Ludvig Lundgren
(Russia) Dmitry Shishlo

Marinčin (Jurčo, Hudáček) – 11:00	1–0
	1–1	15:46 – Ķēniņš (Ābols, Krastenbergs)
Cehlárik (Hrivík, Takáč) – 26:17	2–1
Slafkovský – 31:16	3–1
	3–2	42:07 – Indrašis (Meija, Cibuļskis)
Zuzin (Kelemen, Čerešňák) – 49:21	4–2
Jurčo (ENG) – 59:59	5–2

4 min
Penalties
2 min
33
Shots
20

February 13, 2022; 16:40 v	Finland	4–3 OT (0–0, 0–3, 3–0) (OT: 1–0)	Sweden	Beijing National Indoor Stadium, Beijing; Attendance: 963

Game reference

Juho Olkinuora
Goalies
Magnus Hellberg
Referees:
(Canada) Michael Campbell
(Russia) Roman Gofman
Linesmen:
(United States) William Hancock
(Russia) Nikita Shalagin

	0–1	24:24 – Wallmark (Tömmernes, Pudas) (PP)
	0–2	28:39 – Bengtsson (Tömmernes, Bromé) (PP)
	0–3	31:36 – Lander (Pudas, Klingberg) (PP)
Hartikainen (Manninen, Vatanen) (PP) – 45:34	1–3
Pakarinen (Hartikainen, Manninen) (PP) – 55:30	2–3
Pakarinen (Lehtonen, Hartikainen) – 57:11	3–3
Pesonen – 62:01	4–3

37 min
Penalties
8 min
27
Shots
30

=== Ranking after group stage ===
Following the completion of the preliminary round, all teams were ranked 1D through 12D. The semifinals were then reseeded according to this ranking. To determine this ranking, the following criteria were used in the order presented:

1. higher position in the group
2. higher number of points
3. better goal difference
4. higher number of goals scored for
5. better 2020 IIHF World Ranking.

Team advanced directly to quarterfinals
Team participated in playoffs

Rank	Team	Group	Pos	GP	Pts	GD	GF	IIHF Rank
1D	United States	A	1	3	9	+11	15	4
2D	Finland	C	1	3	8	+7	13	2
3D	ROC	B	1	3	7	+2	8	3
4D	Sweden	C	2	3	7	+3	10	7
5D	Canada	A	2	3	6	+7	12	1
6D	Denmark	B	2	3	6	+1	7	12
7D	Czech Republic	B	3	3	4	+1	9	6
8D	Slovakia	C	3	3	3	−4	8	9
9D	Germany	A	3	3	3	−4	6	5
10D	Switzerland	B	4	3	1	−4	4	8
11D	Latvia	C	4	3	0	−6	5	10
12D	China	A	4	3	0	−14	2	32

== Playoff round ==
=== Bracket ===
Teams were reseeded based on the preliminary round ranking after the quarterfinals.

Playoffs
15 February
Czech Republic	2
Switzerland	4
15 February
Slovakia	4
Germany	0
15 February
Denmark	3
Latvia	2
15 February
Canada	7
China	2

Quarterfinals
16 February
Finland	5
Switzerland	1
16 February
United States	2
Slovakia (GWS)	3
16 February
ROC	3
Denmark	1
16 February
Sweden	2
Canada	0

Semifinals
18 February
Finland	2
Slovakia	0
18 February
ROC (GWS)	2
Sweden	1

Gold medal game
20 February
Finland	2
ROC	1
Bronze medal game
19 February
Sweden	0
Slovakia	4

=== Playoffs ===
February 15, 2022; 12:10 v	Slovakia	4–0 (1–0, 2–0, 1–0)	Germany	Beijing National Indoor Stadium, Beijing; Attendance: 926

Game reference

Patrik Rybár
Goalies
Mathias Niederberger
Referees:
(Sweden) Tobias Björk
(Sweden) Mikael Nord
Linesmen:
(Russia) Gleb Lazarev
(Finland) Lauri Nikulainen

Hudáček (Pospíšil, Gernát) – 11:05	1–0
Cehlárik (Gernát, Hrivík) – 27:01	2–0
Krištof (Kňažko, Čerešňák) – 28:45	3–0
Hrivík (Cehlárik, Takáč) (ENG) – 57:56	4–0

8 min
Penalties
33 min
34
Shots
21

February 15, 2022; 12:10 v	Denmark	3–2 (1–1, 1–1, 1–0)	Latvia	Wukesong Arena, Beijing; Attendance: 726

Game reference

Sebastian Dahm
Goalies
Jānis Kalniņš
Ivars Punnenovs
Referees:
(United States) Andrew Bruggema
(Germany) André Schrader
Linesmen:
(Canada) Dustin McCrank
(Russia) Dmitry Shishlo

Poulsen (Jakobsen, Lassen) – 12:02	1–0
	1–1	16:23 – Dārziņš (Krastenbergs, Cibuļskis)
	1–2	22:33 – Dārzinš (Balinskis, Krastenbergs) (PP)
Jakobsen (Meyer) – 36:57	2–2
Lauridsen (Bødker, Nielsen) (PP) – 41:45	3–2

8 min
Penalties
8 min
31
Shots
27

February 15, 2022; 16:40 v	Czech Republic	2–4 (1–2, 0–1, 1–1)	Switzerland	Beijing National Indoor Stadium, Beijing; Attendance: 990

Game reference

Šimon Hrubec
Goalies
Leonardo Genoni
Referees:
(Russia) Roman Gofman
(Finland) Mikko Kaukokari
Linesmen:
(Sweden) Ludvig Lundgren
(Sweden) Andreas Malmqvist

Klok (Knot, Červenka) – 10:08	1–0
	1–1	14:59 – Ambühl (Thürkauf, Corvi) (PP)
	1–2	15:12 – Mottet (Hollenstein, Diaz)
	1–3	29:53 – Malgin (Alatalo, Andrighetto) (PP)
	1–4	54:57 – Diaz (Andrighetto, Herzog)
Červenka (Krejčí, Kovář) (PP, EA) – 55:59	2–4

6 min
Penalties
4 min
33
Shots
18

February 15, 2022; 21:10 v	Canada	7–2 (2–1, 3–1, 2–0)	China	Beijing National Indoor Stadium, Beijing; Attendance: 994

Game reference

Matt Tomkins
Goalies
Jeremy Smith
Paris O'Brien
Referees:
(Switzerland) Michael Tscherrig
(Finland) Kristian Vikman
Linesmen:
(Switzerland) David Obwegeser
(Czech Republic) Jiří Ondráček

Weal (Tambellini, Noreau) (PP) – 06:57	1–0
Weal (Staal, Tambellini) (PP2) – 09:55	2–0
	2–1	15:32 – Kane (Werek)
Tambellini (Noreau, Weal) (PP) – 26:36	3–1
Tambellini (PS) – 28:39	4–1
O'Dell (Demers, Johnson) – 32:05	5–1
	5–2	38:59 – Kane (Lockhart, Chelios) (PP2)
Staal (McTavish, McBain) – 55:55	6–2
McBain (Noreau, Tambellini) (PP) – 58:19	7–2

15 min
Penalties
18 min
45
Shots
29

=== Quarterfinals ===
February 16, 2022; 12:10 v	United States	2–3 GWS (1–1, 1–0, 0–1) (OT: 0–0) (SO: 0–1)	Slovakia	Beijing National Indoor Stadium, Beijing; Attendance: 1,059

Game reference

Strauss Mann
Goalies
Patrik Rybár
Referees:
(Sweden) Tobias Björk
(Russia) Roman Gofman
Linesmen:
(Canada) Dustin McCrank
(Russia) Nikita Shalagin

	0–1	11:45 – Slafkovský (Čerešňák, Regenda)
Abruzzese (Beniers, Kampfer) – 19:14	1–1
Hentges (Perbix, Smith) – 28:56	2–1
	2–2	59:16 – Hrivík (Čajkovský, Hudáček) (EA)

Brisson (miss)
Farrell (miss)
Knies (miss)
Smith (miss)
Miele (miss)
Shootout
(miss) Hudáček
(miss) Čajkovský
(miss) Krištof
Cehlárik
2 min
Penalties
10 min
35
Shots
37

February 16, 2022; 14:00 v	ROC	3–1 (1–1, 1–0, 1–0)	Denmark	Wukesong Arena, Beijing; Attendance: 727

Game reference

Ivan Fedotov
Goalies
Sebastian Dahm
Referees:
(Canada) Michael Campbell
(Czech Republic) Martin Fraňo
Linesmen:
(Sweden) Andreas Malmqvist
(Czech Republic) Jiří Ondráček

Shipachyov (Gusev, Yakovlev) – 13:01	1–0
	1–1	22:57 – Nielsen (Bau Hansen, Lauridsen) (PP)
Nesterov (Gusev, Gritsyuk) – 34:36	2–1
Voynov (Shipachyov, Gritsyuk) (PP) – 55:45	3–1

4 min
Penalties
6 min
40
Shots
18

February 16, 2022; 16:40 v	Finland	5–1 (2–0, 1–1, 2–0)	Switzerland	Beijing National Indoor Stadium, Beijing; Attendance: 948

Game reference

Harri Säteri
Goalies
Reto Berra
Leonardo Genoni
Referees:
(Latvia) Andris Ansons
(Canada) Oliver Gouin
Linesmen:
(Czech Republic) Daniel Hynek
(United States) Brian Oliver

Aaltonen (Friman, Nättinen) – 08:37	1–0
Lehtonen (Hietanen, Manninen) – 10:45	2–0
Anttila (Björninen) – 23:08	3–0
	3–1	37:49 – Ambühl (Corvi, Haas) (PP)
Pakarinen (Filppula, Pesonen) (ENG) – 55:28	4–1
Hartikainen (ENG) – 56:47	5–1

4 min
Penalties
4 min
23
Shots
34

February 16, 2022; 21:30 v	Sweden	2–0 (0–0, 0–0, 2–0)	Canada	Beijing National Indoor Stadium, Beijing; Attendance: 950

Game reference
Lars Johansson	Goalies	Matt Tomkins	Referees: (United States) Andrew Bruggeman (Russia) Evgenii Romasko; Linesmen: (United States) William Hancock (Russia) Gleb Lazarev
Wallmark – 50:15 / 1–0; Lander (Holmberg) (ENG) – 58:10 / 2–0			Referees: (United States) Andrew Bruggeman (Russia) Evgenii Romasko; Linesmen: (United States) William Hancock (Russia) Gleb Lazarev
6 min	Penalties	6 min	Referees: (United States) Andrew Bruggeman (Russia) Evgenii Romasko; Linesmen: (United States) William Hancock (Russia) Gleb Lazarev
26	Shots	22	Referees: (United States) Andrew Bruggeman (Russia) Evgenii Romasko; Linesmen: (United States) William Hancock (Russia) Gleb Lazarev

=== Semifinals ===
February 18, 2022; 12:10 v	Finland	2–0 (1–0, 0–0, 1–0)	Slovakia	Beijing National Indoor Stadium, Beijing; Attendance: 1,071

Game reference
Harri Säteri	Goalies	Patrik Rybár	Referees: (Sweden) Tobias Björk (Russia) Yevgeni Romasko; Linesmen: (Russia) Gleb Lazarev (Canada) Dustin McCrank
Manninen (Lindbohm, Vatanen) – 15:58 / 1–0; Pesonen (Hartikainen, Pokka) (ENG) – 59:21 / 2–0			Referees: (Sweden) Tobias Björk (Russia) Yevgeni Romasko; Linesmen: (Russia) Gleb Lazarev (Canada) Dustin McCrank
0 min	Penalties	6 min	Referees: (Sweden) Tobias Björk (Russia) Yevgeni Romasko; Linesmen: (Russia) Gleb Lazarev (Canada) Dustin McCrank
27	Shots	28	Referees: (Sweden) Tobias Björk (Russia) Yevgeni Romasko; Linesmen: (Russia) Gleb Lazarev (Canada) Dustin McCrank

February 18, 2022; 21:10 v	ROC	2–1 GWS (0–0, 1–0, 0–1) (OT: 0–0) (SO: 1–0)	Sweden	Beijing National Indoor Stadium, Beijing; Attendance: 1,161

Game reference
Ivan Fedotov	Goalies	Lars Johansson	Referees: (United States) Andrew Bruggeman (Canada) Oliver Gouin; Linesmen: (Czech Republic) Daniel Hynek (Czech Republic) Jiří Ondráček
Slepyshev (Karnaukhov, Yakovlev) – 20:15 / 1–0; / 1–1 / 46:22 – Lander (Tömmernes, Pudas)			Referees: (United States) Andrew Bruggeman (Canada) Oliver Gouin; Linesmen: (Czech Republic) Daniel Hynek (Czech Republic) Jiří Ondráček
Slepyshev (miss); Grigorenko (miss); Gusev; Tkachyov (miss); Yakovlev; Gusev (miss); Gusev (miss); Gritsyuk	Shootout	(miss) Klingberg; Wallmark; Nordström; (miss) Tömmernes; (miss) Lander; (miss) Klingberg; (miss) Wallmark; (miss) Friberg	Referees: (United States) Andrew Bruggeman (Canada) Oliver Gouin; Linesmen: (Czech Republic) Daniel Hynek (Czech Republic) Jiří Ondráček
4 min	Penalties	4 min	Referees: (United States) Andrew Bruggeman (Canada) Oliver Gouin; Linesmen: (Czech Republic) Daniel Hynek (Czech Republic) Jiří Ondráček
41	Shots	35	Referees: (United States) Andrew Bruggeman (Canada) Oliver Gouin; Linesmen: (Czech Republic) Daniel Hynek (Czech Republic) Jiří Ondráček

=== Bronze medal game ===
February 19, 2022; 21:10 v	Sweden	0–4 (0–0, 0–2, 0–2)	Slovakia	Beijing National Indoor Stadium, Beijing; Attendance: 1,229

Game reference

Lars Johansson
Goalies
Patrik Rybár
Referees:
(Canada) Oliver Gouin
(Russia) Evgenii Romasko
Linesmen:
(Russia) Gleb Lazarev
(Russia) Nikita Shalagin

0–1	23:17 – Slafkovský (Čerešňák)
0–2	32:47 – Takáč (Regenda) (PP)
0–3	58:26 – Slafkovský (Cehlárik) (ENG)
0–4	58:46 – Regenda (ENG)

6 min
Penalties
4 min
28
Shots
43

=== Gold medal game ===
February 20, 2022; 12:10 v	Finland	2–1 (0–1, 1–0, 1–0)	ROC	Beijing National Indoor Stadium, Beijing; Attendance: 1,288

Game reference

Harri Säteri
Goalies
Ivan Fedotov
Referees:
(Sweden) Tobias Björk
(United States) Andrew Bruggeman
Linesmen:
(United States) William Hancock
(Canada) Dustin McCrank

	0–1	07:17 – Grigorenko (Nesterov, Gusev) (PP)
Pokka (Björninen, Ohtamaa) – 23:28	1–1
Björninen (Anttila, Ohtamaa) – 40:31	2–1

2 min
Penalties
6 min
31
Shots
17

== Final ranking ==
The places five to twelve were ranked by their preliminary round group placement and then points and goal difference.

Pos	Grp	Team	Pld	W	OTW	OTL	L	GF	GA	GD	Pts	Final result
1st place, gold medalist(s)	C	Finland	6	5	1	0	0	22	8	+14	17	Champions
2nd place, silver medalist(s)	B	ROC	6	3	1	1	1	14	10	+4	12	Runners-up
3rd place, bronze medalist(s)	C	Slovakia	7	3	1	0	3	19	16	+3	11	Third place
4	C	Sweden	6	3	0	2	1	13	13	0	11	Fourth place
5	A	United States	4	3	0	1	0	17	7	+10	10	Eliminated in quarterfinals
6	A	Canada	5	3	0	0	2	19	9	+10	9	Eliminated in quarterfinals
7	B	Denmark	5	3	0	0	2	11	11	0	9	Eliminated in quarterfinals
8	B	Switzerland	5	1	0	1	3	9	15	−6	4	Eliminated in quarterfinals
9	B	Czech Republic	4	0	2	0	2	11	12	−1	4	Eliminated in playoffs
10	A	Germany	4	1	0	0	3	6	14	−8	3	Eliminated in playoffs
11	C	Latvia	4	0	0	0	4	7	14	−7	0	Eliminated in playoffs
12	A	China (H)	4	0	0	0	4	4	23	−19	0	Eliminated in playoffs

Source: IIHF
(H) Host

2022 Men's Olympic champions

Finland
1st title

== Statistics ==
=== Scoring leaders ===
The list shows the top ten skaters sorted by points, then goals.

Player	GP	G	A	Pts	+/−	PIM	POS
(Slovakia) Juraj Slafkovský	7	7	0	7	+5	0	F
(Finland) Sakari Manninen	6	4	3	7	+7	0	F
(Canada) Adam Tambellini	5	3	4	7	–1	0	F
(Finland) Teemu Hartikainen	6	2	5	7	+8	0	F
(United States) Sean Farrell	4	3	3	6	+4	0	F
(Russia) Nikita Gusev	6	0	6	6	+3	2	F
(Sweden) Lucas Wallmark	6	5	0	5	–1	10	F
(Sweden) Anton Lander	6	4	1	5	+2	4	F
(Canada) Jordan Weal	5	3	2	5	0	6	F
(Czech Republic) Roman Červenka	4	2	3	5	–1	0	F

GP = Games played; G = Goals; A = Assists; Pts = Points; +/− = Plus/minus; PIM = Penalties in minutes; POS = Position
Source: IIHF.com

=== Leading goaltenders ===
The list shows the top five goaltenders, based on save percentage, who have played at least 40% of their team's minutes.

Player	TOI	GA	GAA	SA	Sv%	SO
(Slovakia) Patrik Rybár	347:07	5	0.86	146	96.58	2
(United States) Drew Commesso	120:00	2	1.00	55	96.36	1
(Canada) Matt Tomkins	178:06	3	1.01	80	96.25	1
(Finland) Harri Säteri	300:00	5	1.00	132	96.21	1
(Switzerland) Leonardo Genoni	159:45	3	1.13	77	96.10	0

TOI = Time on ice (minutes:seconds); SA = Shots against; GA = Goals against; GAA = Goals against average; Sv% = Save percentage; SO = Shutouts
Source: IIHF.com

== Awards ==
The all-star team was announced on 20 February 2022.

Position	Player
Goaltender	(Slovakia) Patrik Rybár
Defenceman	(Finland) Mikko Lehtonen (Russia) Egor Yakovlev
Forward	(Slovakia) Juraj Slafkovský (Finland) Sakari Manninen (Sweden) Lucas Wallmark
MVP	(Slovakia) Juraj Slafkovský

== See also ==
- Ice hockey at the Winter Olympics
- Ice hockey at the 2022 Winter Olympics – Women's tournament
