= Peter Čerešňák =

Slovak ice hockey player (born 1993)

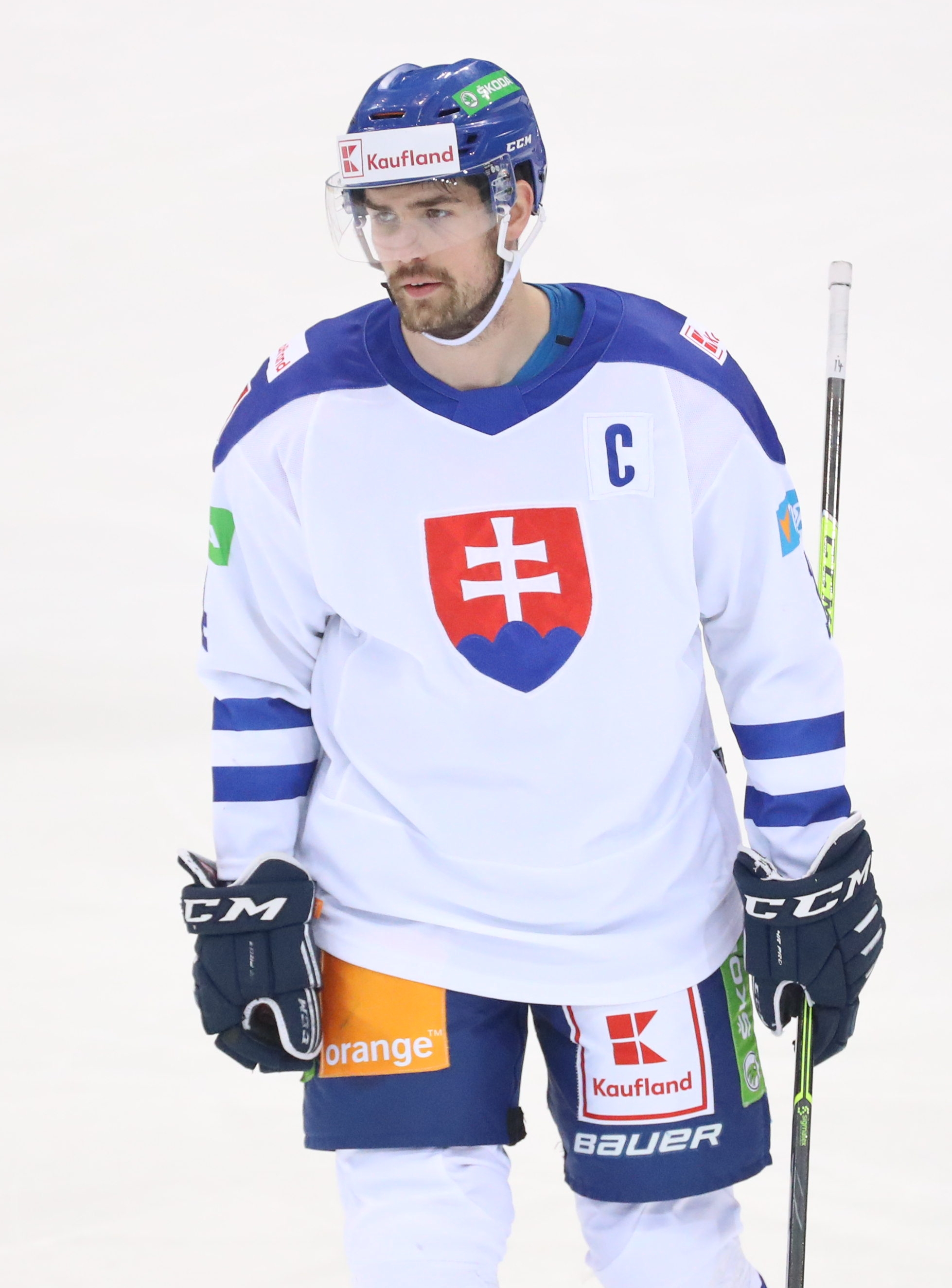
- Čerešňák in 2022
- Born: January 26, 1993 (age 33) Trenčín, Slovakia
- Height: 6 ft 3 in (191 cm)
- Weight: 209 lb (95 kg; 14 st 13 lb)
- Position: Defence
- Shoots: Right
- ELH team Former teams: HC Dynamo Pardubice; HK Dukla Trenčín; HK Orange 20; HC Vítkovice Steel; HC Škoda Plzeň
- National team: Slovakia
- NHL draft: 172nd overall, 2011; New York Rangers
- Playing career: 2010–present

Peter Čerešňák (born January 26, 1993) is a Slovak ice hockey player who is a defenceman for HC Dynamo Pardubice of the Czech Extraliga (ELH).

== Playing career ==
He played with HC Dukla Trenčín in the Slovak Extraliga during the 2009–10 Slovak Extraliga season. He was the New York Rangers 6th round draft pick (172nd overall) in the 2011 NHL entry draft.

Medal record

Ice hockey

Representing Slovakia

Olympic Games
Bronze medal – third place	2022 Beijing	

== Career statistics ==
=== Regular season and playoffs ===
			Regular season					Playoffs
Season	Team	League	GP	G	A	Pts	PIM	GP	G	A	Pts	PIM
2007–08	Dukla Trenčín	SVK U18	10	0	2	2	10	—	—	—	—	—
2008–09	Dukla Trenčín	SVK U18	28	1	2	3	10	—	—	—	—	—
2008–09	Dukla Trenčín	SVK U20	23	1	1	2	0	—	—	—	—	—
2009–10	Dukla Trenčín	SVK U18	2	1	2	3	0	—	—	—	—	—
2009–10	Dukla Trenčín	SVK U20	47	4	18	22	38	—	—	—	—	—
2010–11	Dukla Trenčín	SVK U20	8	0	3	3	4	11	0	3	3	37
2010–11	Dukla Trenčín	SVK	7	0	0	0	0	—	—	—	—	—
2010–11	HK Orange 20	SVK	25	1	3	4	16	—	—	—	—	—
2010–11	Dukla Trenčín	SVK U18	—	—	—	—	—	3	2	2	4	4
2011–12	Peterborough Petes	OHL	61	6	9	15	34	—	—	—	—	—
2012–13	Peterborough Petes	OHL	56	3	9	12	24	—	—	—	—	—
2013–14	HK Dukla Trenčín	SVK	56	3	16	19	24	—	—	—	—	—
2014–15	HC Vítkovice Steel	ELH	46	2	6	8	14	4	0	1	1	0
2015–16	HC Vítkovice Steel	ELH	45	2	20	22	18	—	—	—	—	—
2016–17	HC Škoda Plzeň	ELH	52	1	6	7	14	11	3	3	6	6
2017–18	HC Škoda Plzeň	ELH	43	1	7	8	12	10	0	2	2	0
2018–19	HC Škoda Plzeň	ELH	39	7	14	21	8	14	0	8	8	4
2019–20	HC Škoda Plzeň	ELH	52	5	15	20	34	—	—	—	—	—
2020–21	HC Škoda Plzeň	ELH	44	9	9	18	26	—	—	—	—	—
2021–22	HC Škoda Plzeň	ELH	50	6	34	40	24	5	1	4	5	2
2022–23	HC Dynamo Pardubice	ELH	48	8	21	29	18	11	2	5	7	4
2023–24	HC Dynamo Pardubice	ELH	51	8	29	37	20	16	2	8	10	4
2024–25	HC Dynamo Pardubice	ELH	36	6	16	22	13	16	3	9	12	14
2025–26	HC Dynamo Pardubice	ELH	34	7	12	19	10	12	1	6	7	6
SVK totals			88	4	19	23	40	—	—	—	—	—
ELH totals			542	62	189	251	211	105	12	49	61	40

=== International ===
Year	Team	Event	Result	GP	G	A	Pts	PIM
2010	Slovakia	WJC18	8th	6	0	0	0	6
2011	Slovakia	WJC	8th	6	0	0	0	2
2011	Slovakia	WJC18	10th	6	0	1	1	0
2012	Slovakia	WJC	6th	6	0	0	0	2
2013	Slovakia	WJC	8th	6	1	2	3	0
2014	Slovakia	WC	9th	7	0	0	0	2
2017	Slovakia	WC	14th	7	1	2	3	4
2018	Slovakia	OG	11th	4	2	2	4	2
2021	Slovakia	OGQ	Q	3	0	5	5	0
2022	Slovakia	OG	3rd place, bronze medalist(s)	7	0	5	5	2
2022	Slovakia	WC	8th	8	0	1	1	0
2024	Slovakia	WC	7th	8	0	0	0	4
2024	Slovakia	OGQ	Q	3	0	1	1	0
2026	Slovakia	OG	4th	6	0	2	2	0
Junior totals				30	1	3	4	10
Senior totals				47	3	12	15	14
