= Anton Lander =

Swedish ice hockey player (born 1991)

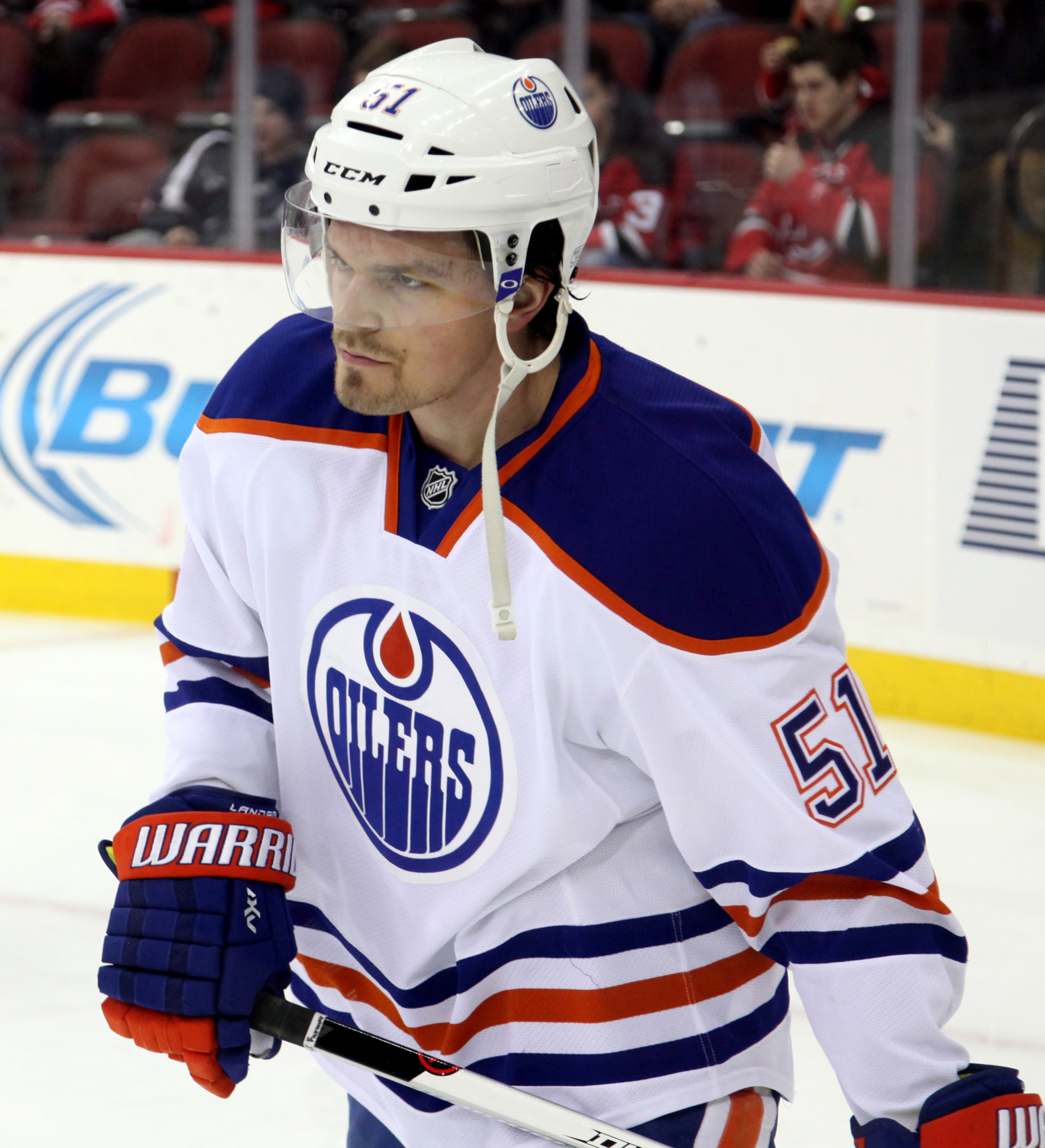
- Lander in February 2015
- Born: April 24, 1991 (age 35) Timrå, Sweden
- Height: 6 ft 0 in (183 cm)
- Weight: 187 lb (85 kg; 13 st 5 lb)
- Position: Centre
- Shoots: Left
- SHL team Former teams: Timrå IK; Edmonton Oilers; Ak Bars Kazan; Lokomotiv Yaroslavl; EV Zug
- National team: Sweden
- NHL draft: 40th overall, 2009; Edmonton Oilers
- Playing career: 2008–present

Sven Anton Lander (born April 24, 1991) is a Swedish professional ice hockey centre for Timrå IK of the Swedish Hockey League (SHL). Lander was drafted in the second round, 40th overall, at the 2009 NHL entry draft by the Edmonton Oilers.

== Playing career ==
Lander broke into the Swedish Elitserien during the 2007–08 season as a centre for Timrå IK. He had also represented Timrå in the junior league between the 2006–07 and 2008–09 seasons. Lander was named one of the alternate captains for the team on September 22, 2009. Before leaving Sweden, Lander played for Timrå IK in the Elitserien, where his father, Anders "Ante" Karlsson was the head coach.

On April 28, 2011, Lander signed a three-year, entry-level contract with the Edmonton Oilers, and committed to play in North America from the 2011–12 season.

Lander scored his first NHL point, an assist on Lennart Petrell's first NHL goal, on November 3, 2011, against the Los Angeles Kings. Lander's first career NHL goal was scored on November 17, 2011, a short-handed goal against Craig Anderson of the Ottawa Senators.

Demoted to the Oilers' farm team in Bakersfield in 2016, and later placed on waivers, Lander signed a contract on May 25, 2017 with Ak Bars Kazan of the KHL.

After two productive seasons with Ak Bars, Lander left as a free agent following the 2018–19 season to sign a two-year contract with Lokomotiv Yaroslavl on May 1, 2019.

On May 17, 2021, Lander joined EV Zug of the National League (NL) on a one-year deal with an option for a second season. In the 2021–22 season, Lander quickly adapted to the Swiss league and contributed offensively with 12 goals and 31 points through 42 regular season games. He added two assists through the post-season, helping Zug claim the NL Championship.

On April 4, 2022, Lander having opted to leave Switzerland, decided to return to Sweden and sign a three-year contract with his original club, Timrå IK of the SHL.

== International play ==
Lander represented Sweden in the 2010 World Junior Championships held in Saskatchewan, Canada. He served as an alternate captain for the Swedish entry.

== Career statistics ==
=== Regular season and playoffs ===
			Regular season					Playoffs
Season	Team	League	GP	G	A	Pts	PIM	GP	G	A	Pts	PIM
2005–06	Timrå IK	J18 Allsv	14	1	6	7	14	—	—	—	—	—
2006–07	Timrå IK	J18 Allsv	12	6	10	16	14	2	1	2	3	0
2006–07	Timrå IK	J20	10	2	1	3	10	—	—	—	—	—
2007–08	Timrå IK	J18	4	6	4	10	8	—	—	—	—	—
2007–08	Timrå IK	J20	18	5	14	19	39	2	1	2	3	0
2007–08	Timrå IK	SEL	32	1	2	3	4	10	0	0	0	0
2008–09	Timrå IK	J20	8	5	1	6	8	—	—	—	—	—
2008–09	Timrå IK	SEL	47	4	6	10	12	7	0	0	0	4
2009–10	Timrå IK	SEL	49	7	9	16	14	5	0	2	2	2
2010–11	Timrå IK	SEL	49	11	15	26	38	—	—	—	—	—
2010–11	Timrå IK	J20	—	—	—	—	—	2	1	2	3	0
2011–12	Edmonton Oilers	NHL	56	2	4	6	12	—	—	—	—	—
2011–12	Oklahoma City Barons	AHL	14	1	4	5	10	14	2	2	4	4
2012–13	Oklahoma City Barons	AHL	47	9	11	20	22	8	5	3	8	4
2012–13	Edmonton Oilers	NHL	11	0	1	1	2	—	—	—	—	—
2013–14	Oklahoma City Barons	AHL	46	18	34	52	30	3	1	1	2	0
2013–14	Edmonton Oilers	NHL	27	0	1	1	4	—	—	—	—	—
2014–15	Oklahoma City Barons	AHL	29	9	22	31	20	—	—	—	—	—
2014–15	Edmonton Oilers	NHL	38	6	14	20	14	—	—	—	—	—
2015–16	Edmonton Oilers	NHL	61	1	2	3	18	—	—	—	—	—
2016–17	Edmonton Oilers	NHL	22	1	3	4	6	—	—	—	—	—
2016–17	Bakersfield Condors	AHL	42	25	30	55	14	—	—	—	—	—
2017–18	Ak Bars Kazan	KHL	54	9	29	38	40	19	8	5	13	4
2018–19	Ak Bars Kazan	KHL	39	10	20	30	26	4	1	1	2	2
2019–20	Lokomotiv Yaroslavl	KHL	53	18	13	31	32	6	0	0	0	4
2020–21	Lokomotiv Yaroslavl	KHL	53	14	18	32	20	7	0	0	0	8
2021–22	EV Zug	NL	42	12	19	31	40	8	0	2	2	6
2022–23	Timrå IK	SHL	51	12	20	32	30	7	3	1	4	6
2023–24	Timrå IK	SHL	52	10	15	25	12	2	0	0	0	0
2024–25	Timrå IK	SHL	50	8	11	19	24	6	0	1	1	29
SHL totals			330	52	77	129	132	35	3	4	7	41
NHL totals			215	10	25	35	56	—	—	—	—	—
KHL totals			199	51	80	131	118	36	9	6	15	18

=== International ===
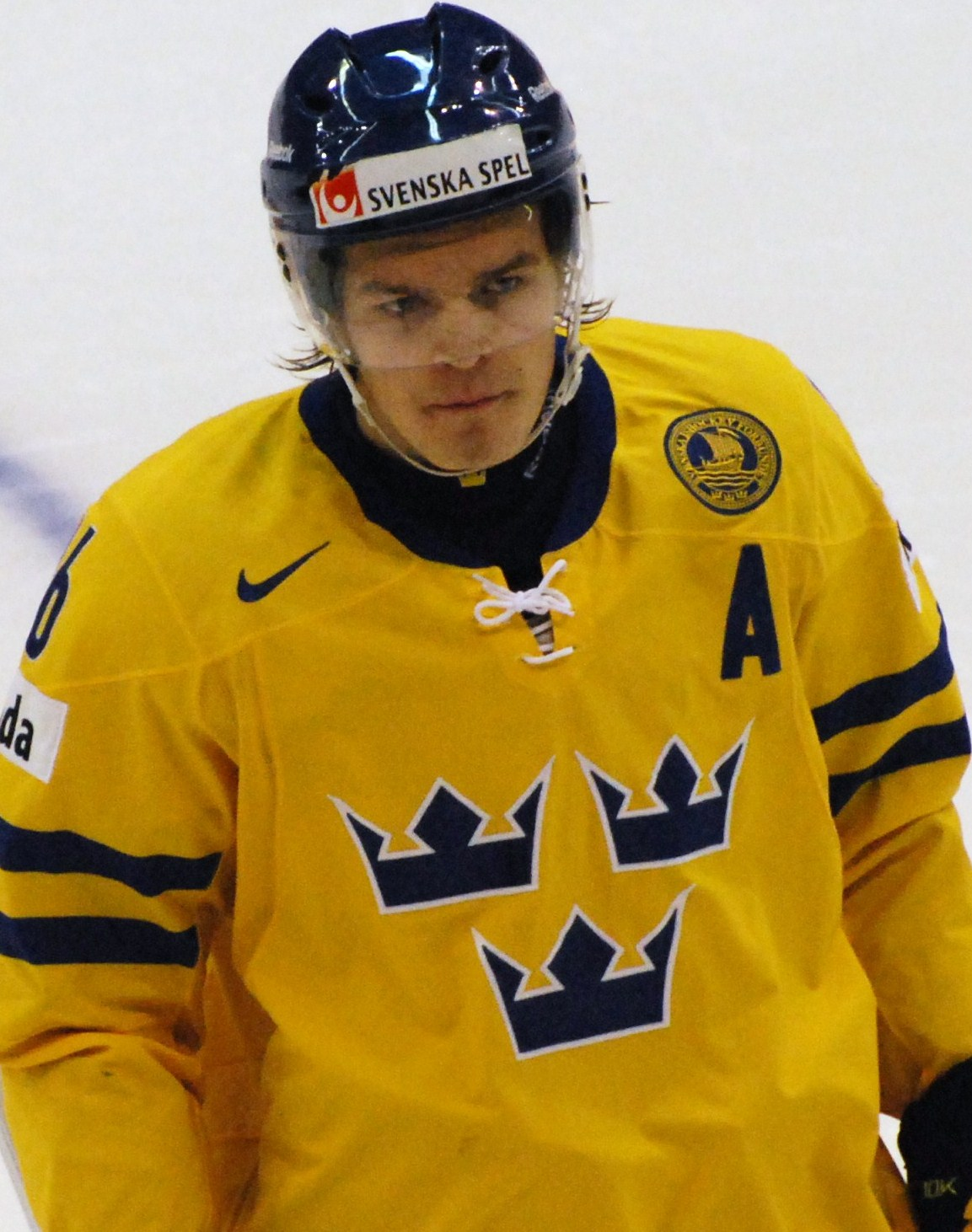
- Lander at the 2010 World Junior Hockey Championships.

Medal record

Representing Sweden

Ice hockey

World Junior Championships
Bronze medal – third place	2010 Canada	

Year	Team	Event	Result	GP	G	A	Pts	PIM
2007	Sweden	IH18	1st place, gold medalist(s)	4	4	1	5	4
2008	Sweden	WJC18	4th	6	0	2	2	4
2009	Sweden	WJC18	5th	6	2	7	9	16
2010	Sweden	WJC	3rd place, bronze medalist(s)	6	5	3	8	4
2011	Sweden	WJC	4th	6	1	3	4	4
2015	Sweden	WC	5th	8	3	4	7	6
2018	Sweden	OG	5th	4	3	0	3	0
2019	Sweden	WC	5th	8	4	4	8	4
2022	Sweden	OG	4th	6	4	1	5	4
Junior totals				28	12	16	28	32
Senior totals				26	14	9	23	14

== Awards and honours ==
Award	Year	Ref
KHL
Gagarin Cup champion	2018	
NL
Champion	2022	
