= Lukáš Klok =

Czech ice hockey player

- Born: 7 June 1995 (age 31) Ostrava, Czech Republic
- Height: 6 ft 1 in (185 cm)
- Weight: 187 lb (85 kg; 13 st 5 lb)
- Position: Defence
- Shoots: Left
- NL team Former teams: EHC Kloten; HC Vítkovice Ridera; HC Slovan Bratislava; Lukko; Neftekhimik Nizhnekamsk; Rögle BK; HC Lugano; SC Bern
- National team: Czech Republic
- NHL draft: Undrafted
- Playing career: 2014–present

Lukáš Klok (born June 7, 1995) is a Czech professional ice hockey defenceman currently playing with EHC Kloten of the Swiss National League (NL).

== Playing career ==
Klok began his professional career with HC Vítkovice Ridera in the Czech Extraliga. After completing his fourth season with the team in 2017–18, he chose to continue his career by signing a one-year contract with Slovak club HC Slovan Bratislava of the KHL on June 22, 2018.

On 14 July 2022, Klok was signed as an undrafted free agent to a one-year entry-level contract by the Arizona Coyotes of the National Hockey League (NHL). Klok participated in training camp and pre-season with the Coyotes before being reassigned to begin his first professional season in North America with American Hockey League (AHL) affiliate the Tucson Roadrunners. Klok made four appearances on the blueline with the Roadrunners to start the 2022–23 season before he was placed on unconditional waivers by the Coyotes in opting to mutually terminate his contract on 28 October 2022.

Klok returned to Europe with Swedish club Rögle BK of the Swedish Hockey League (SHL) for the remainder of the season on 5 November 2022. Klok appeared in 11 games from the blueline with Rögle BK before leaving the club prematurely to sign for the remainder of the season with Swiss National League (NL) club, HC Lugano, on 13 January 2023.

Klok rejoined Neftekhimik Nizhnekamsk of the KHL as a free agent, signing a two-year deal on July 22, 2023, marking his second tenure with the team.

== Statistics ==
=== Regular season and playoffs ===
			Regular season					Playoffs
Season	Team	League	GP	G	A	Pts	PIM	GP	G	A	Pts	PIM
2010–11	HC Vítkovice Steel	CZE U18	25	1	2	3	32	—	—	—	—	—
2011–12	HC Vítkovice Steel	CZE U18	31	0	1	1	30	—	—	—	—	—
2012–13	HC Vítkovice Steel	CZE U18	24	4	23	27	40	1	0	0	0	2
2012–13	HC Vítkovice Steel	CZE U20	24	1	4	5	57	7	0	1	1	10
2013–14	HC Vítkovice Steel	CZE U18	5	0	4	4	8	—	—	—	—	—
2013–14	Youngstown Phantoms	USHL	29	1	2	3	69	—	—	—	—	—
2014–15	HC Vítkovice Steel	CZE U20	3	0	4	4	2	3	0	0	0	4
2014–15	HC Vítkovice Steel	ELH	40	1	3	4	36	1	1	1	2	0
2014–15	HC AZ Havířov 2010	CZE.2	2	0	0	0	2	—	—	—	—	—
2015–16	HC Vítkovice Steel	CZE U20	7	0	6	6	22	4	0	1	1	6
2015–16	HC Vítkovice Steel	ELH	32	5	4	9	42	—	—	—	—	—
2015–16	HC AZ Havířov 2010	CZE.2	1	0	0	0	2	—	—	—	—	—
2016–17	HC Vítkovice Ridera	ELH	45	7	8	15	81	5	0	0	0	8
2017–18	HC Vítkovice Ridera	ELH	45	4	8	12	101	4	0	0	0	6
2018–19	HC Slovan Bratislava	KHL	54	1	7	8	79	—	—	—	—	—
2019–20	Lukko	Liiga	51	5	18	23	87	—	—	—	—	—
2020–21	Lukko	Liiga	46	3	18	21	50	10	1	3	4	2
2021–22	Neftekhimik Nizhnekamsk	KHL	44	5	26	31	27	4	1	3	4	6
2022–23	Tucson Roadrunners	AHL	4	0	0	0	2	—	—	—	—	—
2022–23	Rögle BK	SHL	11	0	1	1	12	—	—	—	—	—
2022–23	HC Lugano	NL	18	5	4	9	8	8	0	3	3	6
2023–24	Neftekhimik Nizhnekamsk	KHL	61	3	18	21	34	—	—	—	—	—
2024–25	Neftekhimik Nizhnekamsk	KHL	27	0	7	7	14	—	—	—	—	—
2024–25	SC Bern	NL	20	3	11	14	12	7	1	1	2	2
ELH totals			162	17	23	40	260	16	1	2	3	22
KHL totals			186	9	58	67	154	4	1	3	4	6
Liiga totals			97	8	36	44	137	10	1	3	4	2
SHL totals			11	0	1	1	12	–	–	–	–	–
NL totals			38	8	15	23	20	15	1	4	5	8

=== International ===
Year	Team	Event	Result	GP	G	A	Pts	PIM
2013	Czech Republic	U18	7th	5	0	0	0	0
2015	Czech Republic	WJC	6th	5	1	0	1	0
2021	Czech Republic	WC	7th	7	2	1	3	6
2022	Czech Republic	OG	9th	4	2	1	3	2
Junior totals				10	1	0	1	0
Senior totals				11	4	2	6	8
