= Jānis Kalniņš (ice hockey) =

Latvian ice hockey player

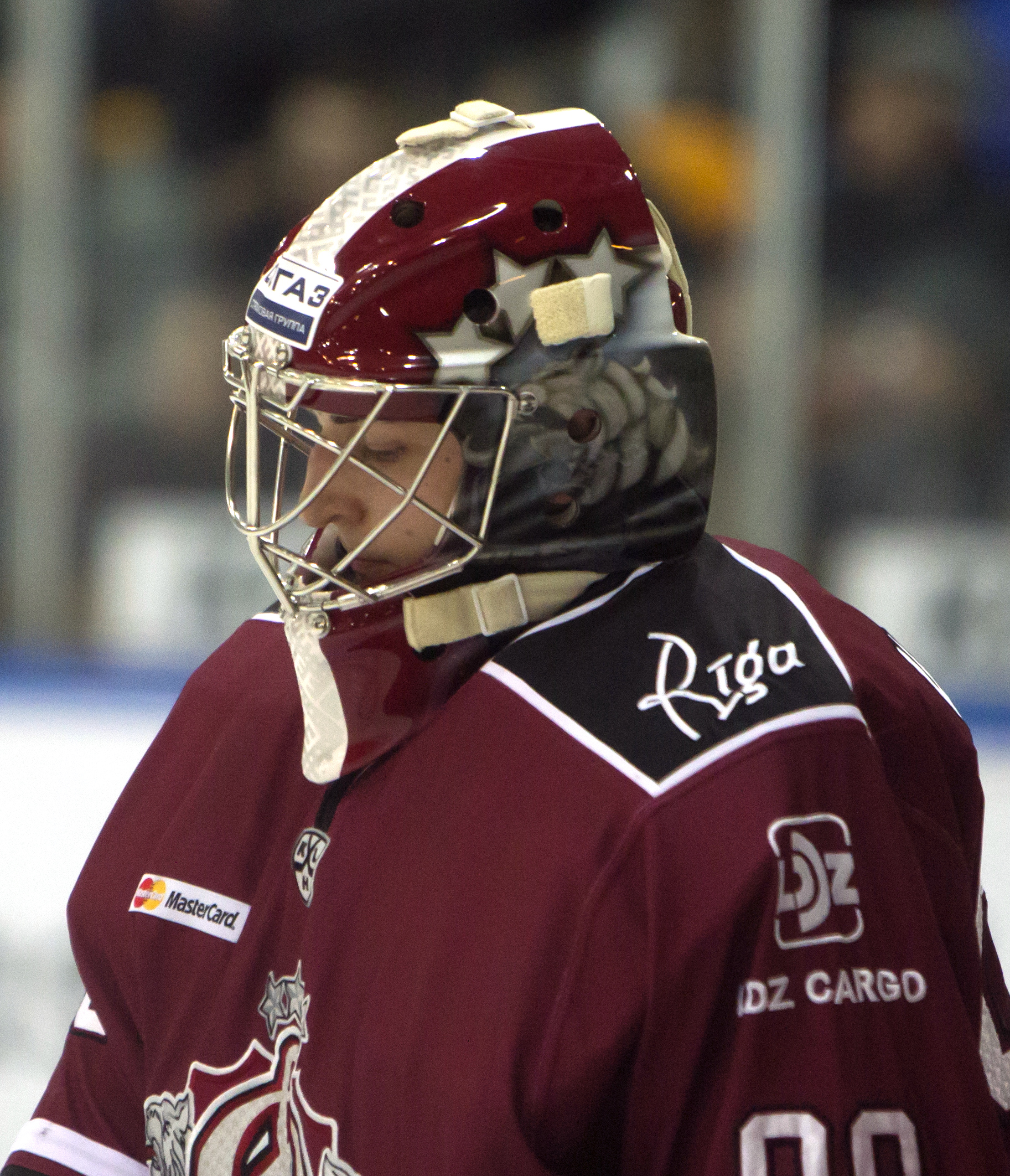
- Kalniņš with Dinamo Riga in 2016
- Born: 13 December 1991 (age 34) Limbaži, Latvia
- Height: 6 ft 0 in (183 cm)
- Weight: 192 lb (87 kg; 13 st 10 lb)
- Position: Goaltender
- Caught: Left
- Played for: HK Liepājas Metalurgs; Dinamo Riga; Jokerit; Växjö Lakers; Tappara; Amur Khabarovsk; Ferencvárosi TC
- National team: Latvia
- Playing career: 2009–2025

Jānis Kalniņš (born 13 December 1991) is a Latvian former professional ice hockey player who is a goaltender. He most recently played for Ferencvárosi TC of the Erste Liga.

== Playing career ==
He formerly played with Dinamo Riga in the KHL before signing as a free agent to a multi-year contract with Jokerit on June 15, 2018.

Kalniņš enjoyed three successful seasons with Jokerit leaving following the 2020–21 season to sign a one-year contract with reigning Swedish champions, Växjö Lakers of the SHL, on 28 June 2021.

Kalniņš also represented Latvian national team at several tournaments, including the 2022 Winter Olympics, but was banned from all national team activities after moving to Russia following the 2022 Russian invasion of Ukraine.

On April 22, 2026, Kalniņš announced his retirement from professional ice hockey on his instagram account.
