= Jonathan Pudas =

Swedish ice hockey player (born 1993)

- Born: 26 April 1993 (age 33) Kiruna, Sweden
- Height: 5 ft 10 in (178 cm)
- Weight: 174 lb (79 kg; 12 st 6 lb)
- Position: Defense
- Shoots: Right
- SHL team Former teams: Skellefteå AIK; Brynäs IF; Jokerit
- National team: Sweden
- Playing career: 2009–present

Jonathan Pudas (born 26 April 1993) is a Swedish professional ice hockey player. He is currently playing with Skellefteå AIK of the Swedish Hockey League (SHL).

== Early life ==
Pudas was born in Kiruna, Sweden, to Finnish-speaking parents from Pajala Municipality. Pudas himself does not speak Finnish.

== Playing career ==
Pudas made his Swedish Hockey League debut playing with Brynäs IF during the 2015–16 SHL season.

After three seasons with Skellefteå AIK, posting a career best 13 goals and 36 points in 52 games during the 2019–20 season, Pudas left the SHL as a free agent and signed a two-year contract with Finnish club, Jokerit of the Kontinental Hockey League (KHL), on 12 May 2020.

Pudas appeared with Jokerit in the 2020–21 season, collecting 2 goals and 10 points through 41 regular season games. After an early post-season exit, he returned to previous club, Skellefteå AIK of the SHL, on a three-year contract on 18 March 2021.

== Career statistics ==
Bold indicates led league

=== Regular season and playoffs ===
			Regular season					Playoffs
Season	Team	League	GP	G	A	Pts	PIM	GP	G	A	Pts	PIM
2008–09	Kiruna IF	J18	16	2	9	11	22	—	—	—	—	—
2009–10	Kiruna IF	J18	32	13	22	35	90	—	—	—	—	—
2009–10	Kiruna IF	SWE.3	10	0	0	0	6	1	0	0	0	0
2010–11	Skellefteå AIK	J18	22	5	28	33	45	—	—	—	—	—
2010–11	Skellefteå AIK	J18 Allsv	18	3	9	12	68	8	0	2	2	2
2010–11	Skellefteå AIK	J20	4	0	3	3	0	—	—	—	—	—
2011–12	Skellefteå AIK	J20	45	7	23	30	16	3	0	1	1	0
2011–12	Kiruna IF	SWE.3	1	0	1	1	0	—	—	—	—	—
2012–13	Skellefteå AIK	J20	42	12	18	30	30	5	1	3	4	0
2012–13	Kiruna IF	SWE.3	3	0	1	1	4	—	—	—	—	—
2012–13	Karlskrona HK	Allsv	4	0	0	0	0	—	—	—	—	—
2013–14	Karlskrona HK	Allsv	52	0	5	5	6	6	0	1	1	0
2014–15	Karlskrona HK	Allsv	52	6	19	25	26	4	0	3	3	4
2015–16	Brynäs IF	SHL	51	2	18	20	14	1	0	0	0	2
2016–17	Brynäs IF	SHL	52	6	13	19	32	20	1	5	6	10
2017–18	Skellefteå AIK	SHL	52	10	18	28	20	16	0	10	10	8
2018–19	Skellefteå AIK	SHL	47	9	17	26	24	6	0	6	6	4
2019–20	Skellefteå AIK	SHL	52	13	23	36	28	—	—	—	—	—
2020–21	Jokerit	KHL	41	2	8	10	6	2	1	0	1	0
2021–22	Skellefteå AIK	SHL	42	7	37	44	32	6	2	1	3	4
2022–23	Skellefteå AIK	SHL	50	11	34	45	28	17	3	9	**12**	12
2023–24	Skellefteå AIK	SHL	50	12	30	42	24	4	0	1	1	4
2024–25	Skellefteå AIK	SHL	47	6	24	30	24	6	1	2	3	20
SHL totals			443	76	214	290	226	76	7	34	41	64
KHL totals			41	2	8	10	6	2	1	0	1	0

=== International ===
Year	Team	Event	Result	GP	G	A	Pts	PIM
2021	Sweden	WC	9th	7	1	0	1	0
2022	Sweden	OG	4th	6	0	5	5	2
2022	Sweden	WC	6th	4	0	1	1	0
2023	Sweden	WC	6th	8	0	2	2	0
Senior totals				25	1	8	9	2

== Awards and honours ==
Award	Year
SHL
Le Mat Trophy	2024
Salming Trophy	2023-24
