= Parker Foo =

Canadian ice hockey player (born 1994)

- Born: September 12, 1998 (age 27) Edmonton, Alberta, Canada
- Height: 188 cm (6 ft 2 in)
- Weight: 92 kg (203 lb; 14 st 7 lb)
- Position: Left wing
- Shoots: Left
- KHL team Former teams: Shanghai Dragons; Kunlun Red Star
- National team: China
- NHL draft: 144th overall, 2017; Chicago Blackhawks
- Playing career: 2020–present

Parker Foo (born September 12, 1998), also known as Fu Shuai (Chinese: 福帅), is a Chinese Canadian professional ice hockey forward for the Shanghai Dragons of the Kontinental Hockey League (KHL).

== Playing career ==
A native of Edmonton, Foo began his junior hockey career in the Alberta Junior Hockey League (AJHL) in 2015 with the Bonnyville Pontiacs, and later with the Brooks Bandits.

From 2017 to 2020 he played for the Union Dutchmen of the NCAA's ECAC Hockey conference.

In 2020 he joined his brother Spencer Foo at Kunlun Red Star of the KHL.

In the 2025–26 season, he remained on the team as the Kunlun Red Star became the Shanghai Dragons.

Parker Foo scored the Dragons' first goal in their first regular season game on 6 September 2025.

== International play ==
Foo was formally called up to represent the China men's national ice hockey team for the 2022 Winter Olympics on January 28, 2022, together with his brother, Spencer Foo. They were among 11 naturalized players of Chinese descent on the roster, qualifying through their father, who comes from the Chinese diaspora in Guyana.

== Career statistics ==
=== Regular season and playoffs ===
			Regular season					Playoffs
Season	Team	League	GP	G	A	Pts	PIM	GP	G	A	Pts	PIM
2013–14	CAC Canadians AAA	AMHL	3	1	2	3	0	—	—	—	—	—
2014–15	CAC Canadians AAA	AMHL	34	15	15	30	18	12	4	4	8	10
2014–15	Bonnyville Pontiacs	AJHL	1	0	0	0	0	—	—	—	—	—
2015–16	Bonnyville Pontiacs	AJHL	5	0	1	1	0	—	—	—	—	—
2015–16	Brooks Bandits	AJHL	44	8	19	27	56	13	4	2	6	14
2016–17	Brooks Bandits	AJHL	60	34	32	66	58	13	10	10	20	4
2017–18	Union College	ECAC	33	1	5	6	17	—	—	—	—	—
2018–19	Union College	ECAC	35	5	10	15	30	—	—	—	—	—
2019–20	Union College	ECAC	20	3	4	7	10	—	—	—	—	—
2020–21	Kunlun Red Star	KHL	32	2	1	3	4	—	—	—	—	—
2021–22	Kunlun Red Star	KHL	35	7	10	17	24	—	—	—	—	—
2022–23	Kunlun Red Star	KHL	60	15	15	30	32	—	—	—	—	—
2023–24	Kunlun Red Star	KHL	53	10	14	24	14	—	—	—	—	—
2024–25	Kunlun Red Star	KHL	46	6	9	15	22	—	—	—	—	—
2025–26	Shanghai Dragons	KHL	25	3	2	5	4	—	—	—	—	—
KHL totals			251	43	51	94	100	—	—	—	—	—

=== International ===
Year	Team	Event	Result	GP	G	A	Pts	PIM
2022	China	OG	12th	4	1	0	1	4
2022	China	WC D2A	27th	4	4	6	10	2
2023	China	WC D1B	25th	5	2	6	8	2
Senior totals				13	7	12	19	8
