= Ice hockey in China =

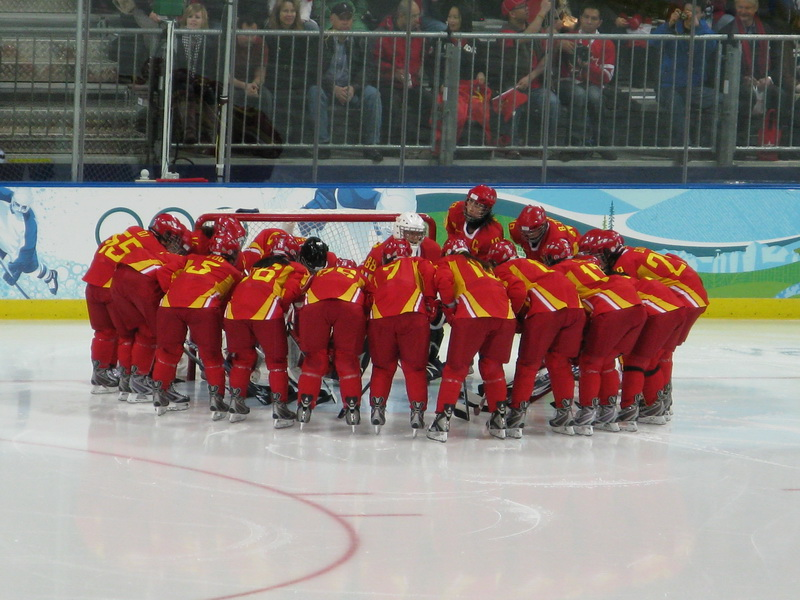
- The Chinese women's ice hockey team huddles before their game against Russia at the 2010 Winter Olympics.
- Country: China
- Governing body: Chinese Ice Hockey Association
- National teams: Men's national team; Women's national team

National competitions
- Chinese Ice Hockey Championship

International competitions
- IIHF World Championships; Winter Olympics; World Cup

Ice hockey in the People's Republic of China is a minor sport that is gaining popularity quickly in the country. The history of ice hockey in China dates back to the mid-20th century. The Chinese Ice Hockey Association acts as the governing body for the sport in the country. China has men's, women's, and junior national teams that compete against other national teams. The China national ice hockey teams made major preparations for improvements to be competitive for the 2022 Winter Olympics.

The Chinese Ice Hockey Championship is a national ice hockey championship that is played annually by amateur teams throughout China. The Chinese Ice Hockey Championship was first held in 1953.

== Professional ice hockey ==
Founded in 2016, Kunlun Red Star were the most prominent Chinese professional ice hockey club. Kunlun Red Star played in the Kontinental Hockey League (KHL), a professional ice hockey league with teams based in Belarus, Kazakhstan, and Russia. It was established as part of China's broader efforts to prepare for the 2022 Winter Olympics in Beijing, serving as the flagship team in a centralized Olympic development program. During this period, additional Chinese teams also competed in the VHL, MHL, North American junior leagues, and the Czech third division to support player development.

Kunlun's participation in the KHL enabled the naturalization of several heritage players from North America, including Brandon Yip, Spencer Foo, and Tyler Wong, while also providing opportunities for top domestic talents such as Ying Rudi and Zesen Zhang. In 2019, Ying Rudi became the first Chinese-native to score a goal in the KHL.

However, the club's role in Chinese hockey has since diminished. Following a relocation to Mytishchi during the COVID-19 pandemic and a gradual shift away from developing Chinese players, the team's current roster features mostly imports, and its long-term future remains uncertain.

In 2024, China launched its domestic professional league, the Chinese Ice Hockey League (CIHL). The inaugural 2024–25 season featured four teams – Beijing Lions, KRS Shenzhen, Anhui Xinhua, and Liaoning Shenyang – each playing 18 regular-season games followed by playoffs. To boost competitiveness, teams were allowed to sign up to five foreign skaters, mostly from Russia and Belarus, while using exclusively domestic goaltenders. The Beijing Lions, built around the core of the national team, won the inaugural CIHL championship.

Kunlun Red Star also owns a professional women's ice hockey team, Shenzhen KRS, based in Shenzhen. Established in 2017, KRS Vanke Rays played in the Canadian Women's Hockey League, with teams based in Canada and the United States.

On 6 August 2025, the team announced it was relocating to Shanghai to become the Shanghai Dragons.

From 2004 to 2017, several men's ice hockey teams based in China played in Asia League Ice Hockey, a professional league made up of teams from Japan, South Korea, and the Russian Far East.

In 2015, Andong Song became the first Chinese national drafted by a National Hockey League (NHL) team, a men's professional league consisting of teams from Canada, and the United States. Song was drafted by the New York Islanders in the 6th round (172nd overall) in the 2015 NHL entry draft. He was later followed by Kevin He, drafted in 2024, then Haoxi Wang and Will Belle in 2025. Wang, who was selected 33rd overall by the San Jose Sharks, became the highest-drafted Chinese-born player in NHL history.

The Chinese women's team played in the highest division of the IIHF Women's World Championship from 1998 to 2009, during which time they also hosted the competition in 2008. Following relegation to the lower divisions, they briefly returned to the top division in 2024, but were then immediately relegated again.

== Attendances ==
The former Kontinental Hockey League club Kunlun Red Star became the first professional ice hockey club from China. The Kunlun Red Star average home league attendances by season:

Season	Average
2024-25	2,253
2023-24	1,650
