= Jason Fram =

Chinese ice hockey player (born 1995)

- Born: April 23, 1995 (age 31) Vancouver, British Columbia, Canada
- Height: 5 ft 11 in (180 cm)
- Weight: 194 lb (88 kg; 13 st 12 lb)
- Position: Defenceman
- Shoots: Right
- EIHL team Former teams: Belfast Giants; San Jose Barracuda; Kunlun Red Star; HC Asiago; Glasgow Clan
- National team: China
- NHL draft: Undrafted
- Playing career: 2016–present

Jason Fram (born April 23, 1995), also known as Liu Jie (Chinese: 刘杰), is a Canadian-born Chinese professional ice hockey defenceman currently playing with Belfast Giants of the Elite Ice Hockey League (EIHL).

== Playing career ==
Born in Canada, Fram previously played for the Kunlun Red Star of the Kontinental Hockey League (KHL). Fram was called up to represent the China men's national ice hockey team for the 2022 Winter Olympics.

== Career statistics ==
=== Regular season and playoffs ===
			Regular season					Playoffs
Season	Team	League	GP	G	A	Pts	PIM	GP	G	A	Pts	PIM
2010–11	Richmond Sockeyes	PJHL	2	0	1	1	0	6	0	1	1	0
2011–12	Spokane Chiefs	WHL	51	4	3	7	22	13	1	1	2	9
2012–13	Spokane Chiefs	WHL	60	1	14	15	20	9	0	2	2	0
2013–14	Spokane Chiefs	WHL	72	6	51	57	34	4	0	3	3	0
2014–15	Spokane Chiefs	WHL	70	9	53	62	20	6	1	2	3	2
2015–16	Spokane Chiefs	WHL	55	12	34	46	22	6	1	3	4	4
2016–17	San Jose Barracuda	AHL	2	0	0	0	0	—	—	—	—	—
2016–17	Allen Americans	ECHL	6	2	0	2	2	—	—	—	—	—
2016–17	University of Alberta	USports	12	4	4	8	0	—	—	—	—	—
2017–18	University of Alberta	USports	28	9	14	23	18	—	—	—	—	—
2018–19	University of Alberta	USports	28	9	21	30	14	—	—	—	—	—
2019–20	Kunlun Red Star	KHL	17	2	3	5	2	—	—	—	—	—
2019–20	KRS-BSU	VHL	18	4	4	8	10	—	—	—	—	—
2020–21	Kunlun Red Star	KHL	29	6	2	8	8	—	—	—	—	—
2021–22	Kunlun Red Star	KHL	48	4	10	14	8	—	—	—	—	—
2022–23	Kunlun Red Star	KHL	46	2	4	6	14	—	—	—	—	—
2023–24	Kunlun Red Star	KHL	46	3	3	6	20	—	—	—	—	—
KHL totals			186	17	22	39	52	—	—	—	—	—

=== International ===
Year	Team	Event	Result	GP	G	A	Pts	PIM
2022	China	OG	12th	4	0	0	0	2
2022	China	WC D2A	27th	4	0	1	1	2
2023	China	WC D1B	25th	5	2	1	3	0
Senior totals				13	2	2	4	4
