= Brandon Yip =

Chinese-Canadian ice hockey player (born 1985)

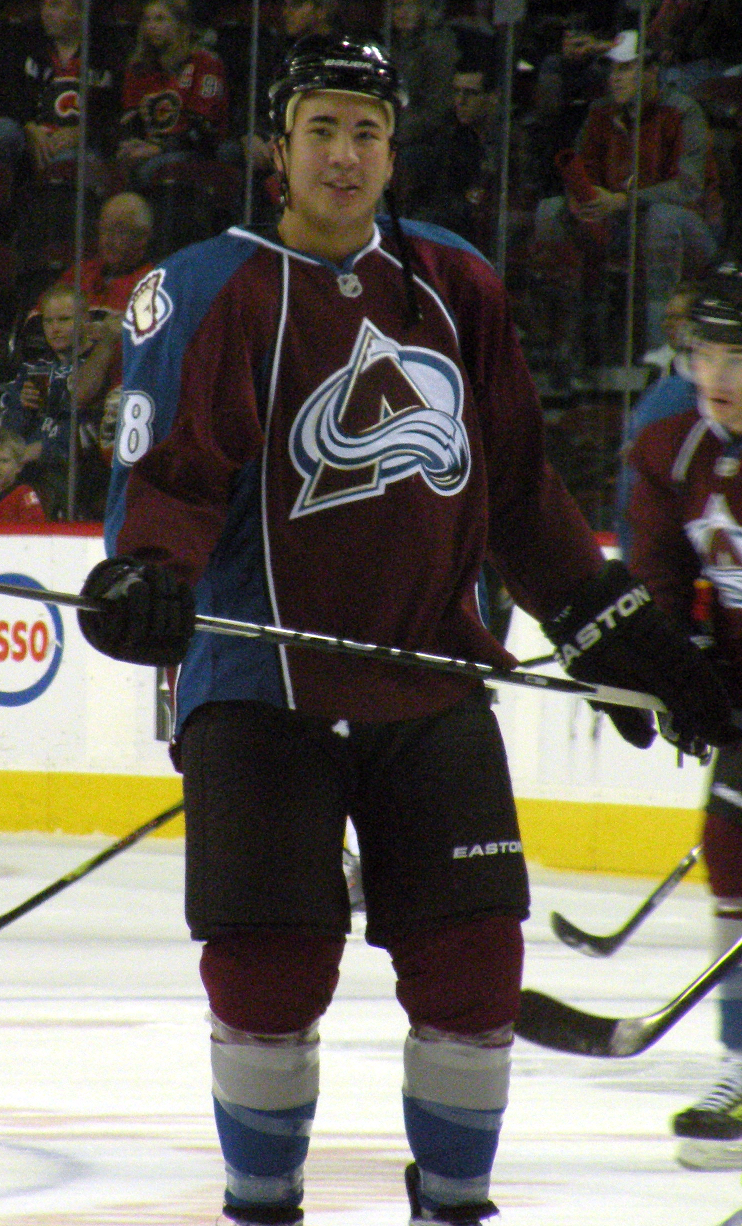
- Born: April 25, 1985 (age 41) Vancouver, British Columbia, Canada
- Height: 6 ft 1 in (185 cm)
- Weight: 195 lb (88 kg; 13 st 13 lb)
- Position: Right wing
- Shot: Right
- Played for: Colorado Avalanche; Nashville Predators; Phoenix Coyotes; Adler Mannheim; Düsseldorfer EG; Kunlun Red Star; Jukurit
- National team: China
- NHL draft: 239th overall, 2004; Colorado Avalanche
- Playing career: 2009–2025

Brandon Michael Harry Yip (Chinese: 葉勁光; pinyin: Yè Jìnguāng; Jyutping: Jip6 Ging6 Gwong1; born April 25, 1985) is a Chinese-Canadian former professional ice hockey right wing who played with HC Kunlun Red Star of the Kontinental Hockey League (KHL), and earlier also played for the Colorado Avalanche, Nashville Predators, and the Phoenix Coyotes in the National Hockey League. He is of 3/4 Chinese and 1/4 Irish descent.

== Playing career ==
The Avalanche drafted Yip in the 8th round, 239th overall in the 2004 NHL entry draft. He played junior hockey with the Coquitlam Express of the BCHL before enrolling to play collegiate hockey with Boston University of the Hockey East. In his freshman year in 2005–06, Yip scored 31 points in 39 games and was named Hockey East rookie of the year. In his junior year with the Terriers in 2007–08, Yip served an indefinite suspension for breaking team rules before returning to finish with 23 points in 37 games. After winning the NCAA Men's Ice Hockey Championship with the Terriers in his senior year in 2008–09, Yip graduated from Boston University with high honors with a B.S. in criminal justice.

On July 22, 2009, Yip signed a one-year entry-level contract with the Avalanche. Before his first pro season in 2009–10, Yip suffered a broken hand in a pre-season game that sidelined him for the first two months of the year. He made his professional debut with the Avalanche's American Hockey League affiliate, the Lake Erie Monsters, for a six-game stint. Colorado recalled him on December 19, 2009, to make his NHL debut in a 5-2 home win against the Columbus Blue Jackets. Yip scored his first goal three days later against Jonas Hiller of the Anaheim Ducks. In his first 22 games he scored 11 goals before suffering a separated shoulder against the Detroit Red Wings on March 1, 2010. Yip ended his 2009-10 campaign leading all rookies in goals per game average. After finishing second on the Avalanche in playoff scoring with four points against the San Jose Sharks in the conference quarterfinals, Yip was re-signed to a two-year contract on July 7, 2010. On November 6, 2010, he registered a Gordie Howe hat trick during a 5-0 victory over the Dallas Stars.

During the 2011–12 season, after ten scoreless games with the Avalanche, Yip was placed on waivers and claimed by the Nashville Predators on January 19, 2012. On January 24, he had his debut for the Predators in a 3-1 victory over the Chicago Blackhawks. Yip established a role on the Predators lower checking lines, scoring 3 goals, including two in two games against his former club Colorado, and 7 points in 25 games.

The Predators re-signed Yip to a one-year contract on June 21, 2012. In the lockout shortened 2012–13 season, Yip transitioned quickly to contribute 5 points in his first ten games of the campaign before finishing with 8 points in 34 games. He missed the final eight games of the year due to injury.

On July 19, 2013, Yip was signed as a free agent by the Phoenix Coyotes to a one-year, two-way contract. After attending the Coyotes training camp, Yip failed to make the opening night roster and was assigned to the AHL for the first time since 2009 with affiliate, the Portland Pirates. In the early stages of the 2013–14 season, Yip was recalled to Phoenix to appear in 2 games before he was reassigned to the Pirates for the remainder of the campaign.

Unsigned into the off-season, Yip accepted an invitation to attend the Anaheim Ducks 2014 training camp on a professional try-out contract on September 18, 2014. Yip failed to earn an NHL contract with the Ducks, however, was reassigned and signed with AHL affiliate, the Norfolk Admirals to begin the 2014–15 season. Yip produced 12 points in 31 games with the Admirals before he was loaned to play in the ECHL for the first time in his career with the Utah Grizzlies on January 15, 2015.

After seven games with the Grizzlies, Yip sought a release from his contract with Norfolk, and on February 6, 2015, it was announced that Yip had signed his first contract abroad with German club Adler Mannheim for the rest of the DEL season. On October 20, 2016, he inked a deal with another German side, putting pen to paper on a contract for the remainder of the 2016–17 campaign with Düsseldorfer EG.

As a free agent, with the ambition to follow his Chinese origins and represent at the 2022 Winter Olympics, Yip left Germany and signed a contract with Chinese club, HC Kunlun Red Star of the Kontinental Hockey League (KHL) on June 5, 2017.

As team captain in two of his three seasons with Kunlun, Yip was left un-signed leading into the pandemic affected 2020–21 season. On January 9, 2021, he was belatedly signed to join Finnish club, Mikkelin Jukurit of the Liiga, for the remainder of the season. He made 15 regular season appearances, recording 2 goals and 6 points, in his short tenure in the Liiga.

As a free agent heading into an Olympic year with ambitions to appear with the Chinese national team, Yip returned to his former club, Kunlun Red Star of the KHL, on a one-year deal on July 26, 2021.

On September 3, 2025 he announced his retirement before the start of the 2025–26 regular season. In that season, Kunlun Red Star rebranded as the Shanghai Dragons.

== International play ==
Due to his tenure in China, Yip was formally called up to represent the China men's national ice hockey team for the 2022 Winter Olympics on January 28, 2022. Yip was one of 11 heritage players on the Chinese Olympic team, himself having three-quarters Chinese ancestry. He served as team captain during the tournament. Yip has expressed his intention to support the growth of ice hockey in China even after his playing career. He notably dropped the ceremonial first puck at the launch of the professional Chinese Ice Hockey League (CIHL) in November 2024.

== Career statistics ==
=== Regular season and playoffs ===
			Regular season					Playoffs
Season	Team	League	GP	G	A	Pts	PIM	GP	G	A	Pts	PIM
2001–02	Ridge Meadows Flames	PJHL	4	1	1	2	4	—	—	—	—	—
2002–03	Ridge Meadows Flames	PJHL	38	25	37	62	71	—	—	—	—	—
2003–04	Coquitlam Express	BCHL	56	31	38	69	87	4	1	2	3	14
2004–05	Coquitlam Express	BCHL	43	20	42	62	92	7	6	1	7	12
2005–06	Boston University	HE	39	9	22	31	59	—	—	—	—	—
2006–07	Boston University	HE	18	5	6	11	29	—	—	—	—	—
2007–08	Boston University	HE	37	11	12	23	28	—	—	—	—	—
2008–09	Boston University	HE	45	20	23	43	118	—	—	—	—	—
2009–10	Lake Erie Monsters	AHL	6	2	0	2	4	—	—	—	—	—
2009–10	Colorado Avalanche	NHL	32	11	8	19	22	6	2	2	4	6
2010–11	Colorado Avalanche	NHL	71	12	10	22	54	—	—	—	—	—
2011–12	Colorado Avalanche	NHL	10	0	0	0	8	—	—	—	—	—
2011–12	Nashville Predators	NHL	25	3	4	7	20	10	1	1	2	6
2012–13	Nashville Predators	NHL	34	3	5	8	26	—	—	—	—	—
2013–14	Portland Pirates	AHL	66	14	20	34	87	—	—	—	—	—
2013–14	Phoenix Coyotes	NHL	2	0	0	0	0	—	—	—	—	—
2014–15	Norfolk Admirals	AHL	31	3	9	12	8	—	—	—	—	—
2014–15	Utah Grizzlies	ECHL	7	1	3	4	2	—	—	—	—	—
2014–15	Adler Mannheim	DEL	6	1	1	2	2	14	0	4	4	38
2015–16	Adler Mannheim	DEL	44	10	6	16	134	3	0	0	0	2
2016–17	Düsseldorfer EG	DEL	41	11	8	19	118	—	—	—	—	—
2017–18	Kunlun Red Star	KHL	48	9	9	18	44	—	—	—	—	—
2018–19	Kunlun Red Star	KHL	62	21	15	36	89	—	—	—	—	—
2019–20	Kunlun Red Star	KHL	50	15	16	31	51	—	—	—	—	—
2020–21	Jukurit	Liiga	15	2	4	6	49	—	—	—	—	—
2021–22	Kunlun Red Star	KHL	46	13	14	27	27	—	—	—	—	—
2022–23	Kunlun Red Star	KHL	59	21	21	42	57	—	—	—	—	—
2023–24	Kunlun Red Star	KHL	67	13	16	29	89	—	—	—	—	—
2024–25	Kunlun Red Star	KHL	8	0	2	2	4	—	—	—	—	—
NHL totals			174	29	27	56	130	16	3	3	6	12
KHL totals			340	92	93	185	361	—	—	—	—	—

=== International ===
Year	Team	Event	Result	GP	G	A	Pts	PIM
2022	China	OG	12th	4	0	1	1	4
2022	China	WC D2A	27th	4	3	3	6	0
2023	China	WC D1B	25th	5	1	3	4	10
Senior totals				13	4	7	11	14

== Awards and honours ==
Award	Year
College
All-Hockey East Rookie Team	2005–06
HE Rookie of the Year	2006

Awards and achievements
Preceded by Peter Vetri	Hockey East Rookie of the Year; 2005–06	Succeeded by Teddy Purcell
Sporting positions
Preceded by Alexei Ponikarovsky	Kunlun Red Star captain 2018–2025	Succeeded by Spencer Foo
