= Jeremy Smith (ice hockey) =

American-Chinese ice hockey player

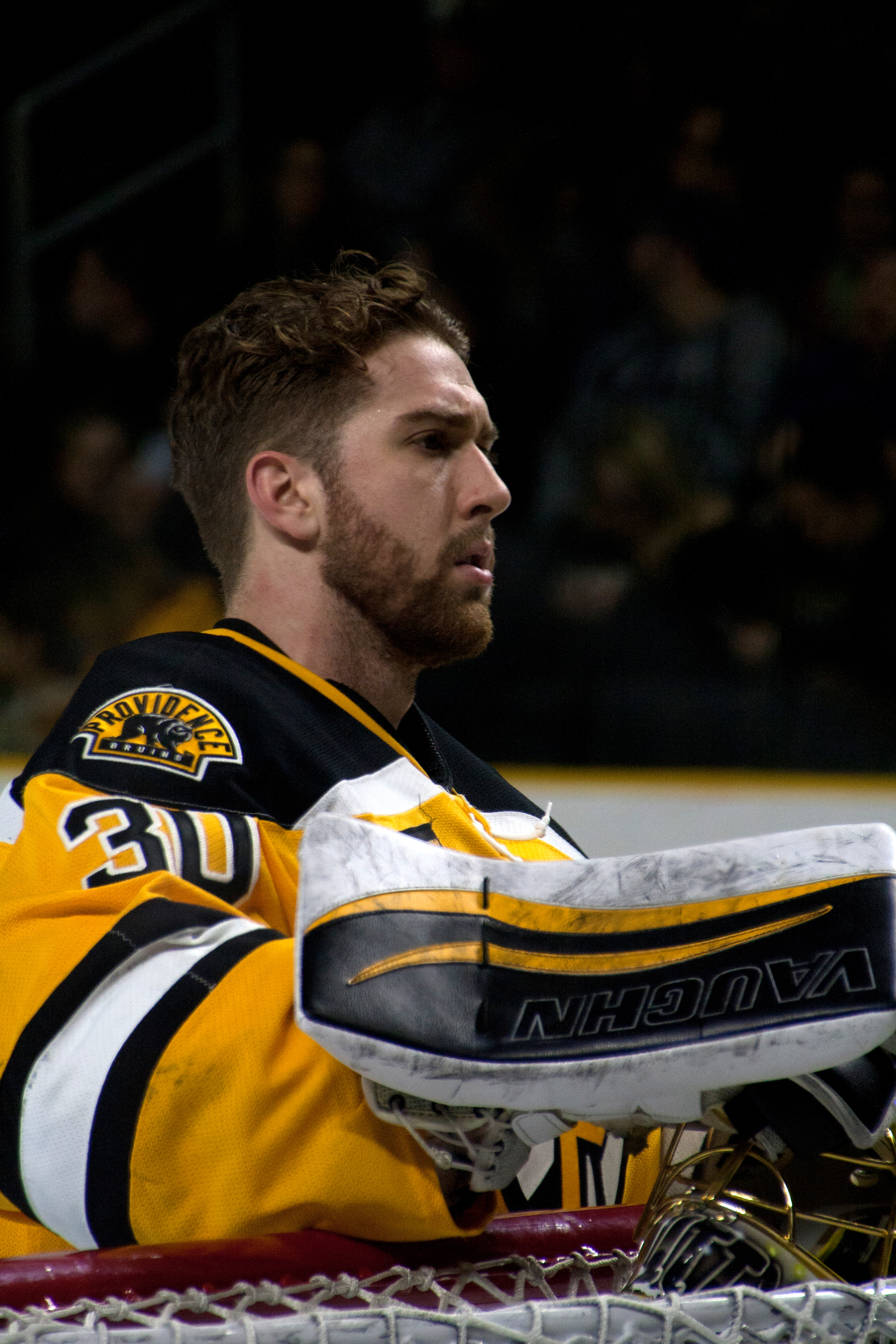
- Smith with the Providence Bruins in 2015
- Born: April 13, 1989 (age 37) Dearborn, Michigan, U.S.
- Height: 6 ft 0 in (183 cm)
- Weight: 175 lb (79 kg; 12 st 7 lb)
- Position: Goaltender
- Catches: Left
- AHL team Former teams: Free agent Colorado Avalanche; Kunlun Red Star
- National team: China
- NHL draft: 54th overall, 2007; Nashville Predators
- Playing career: 2009–present

Chinese name
- Traditional Chinese: 傑瑞米·史密斯
- Simplified Chinese: 杰瑞米·史密斯
Transcriptions
Standard Mandarin
- Hanyu Pinyin: Jiéruìmǐ Shǐmìsī

Jeremy Smith (born April 13, 1989), also known as Jieruimi Shimisi, is a Chinese-American professional ice hockey goaltender who is currently an unrestricted free agent. He most recently played for the Bridgeport Islanders in the American Hockey League (AHL). Born in the United States, Smith represented China at the 2022 Winter Olympics while playing hockey with Kunlun Red Star of the Kontinental Hockey League. Smith was selected in the second round, 54th overall, by the Nashville Predators in the 2007 NHL entry draft.

== Playing career ==
After turning professional with the Predators organization in the 2009–10 season, Smith was shuffled between the Milwaukee Admirals of the American Hockey League (AHL) and the Cincinnati Cyclones of the ECHL.

On July 5, 2013, Smith signed a one-year contract as a free agent with the Columbus Blue Jackets. After attending the Blue Jackets training camp, he was assigned to AHL affiliate, the Springfield Falcons.

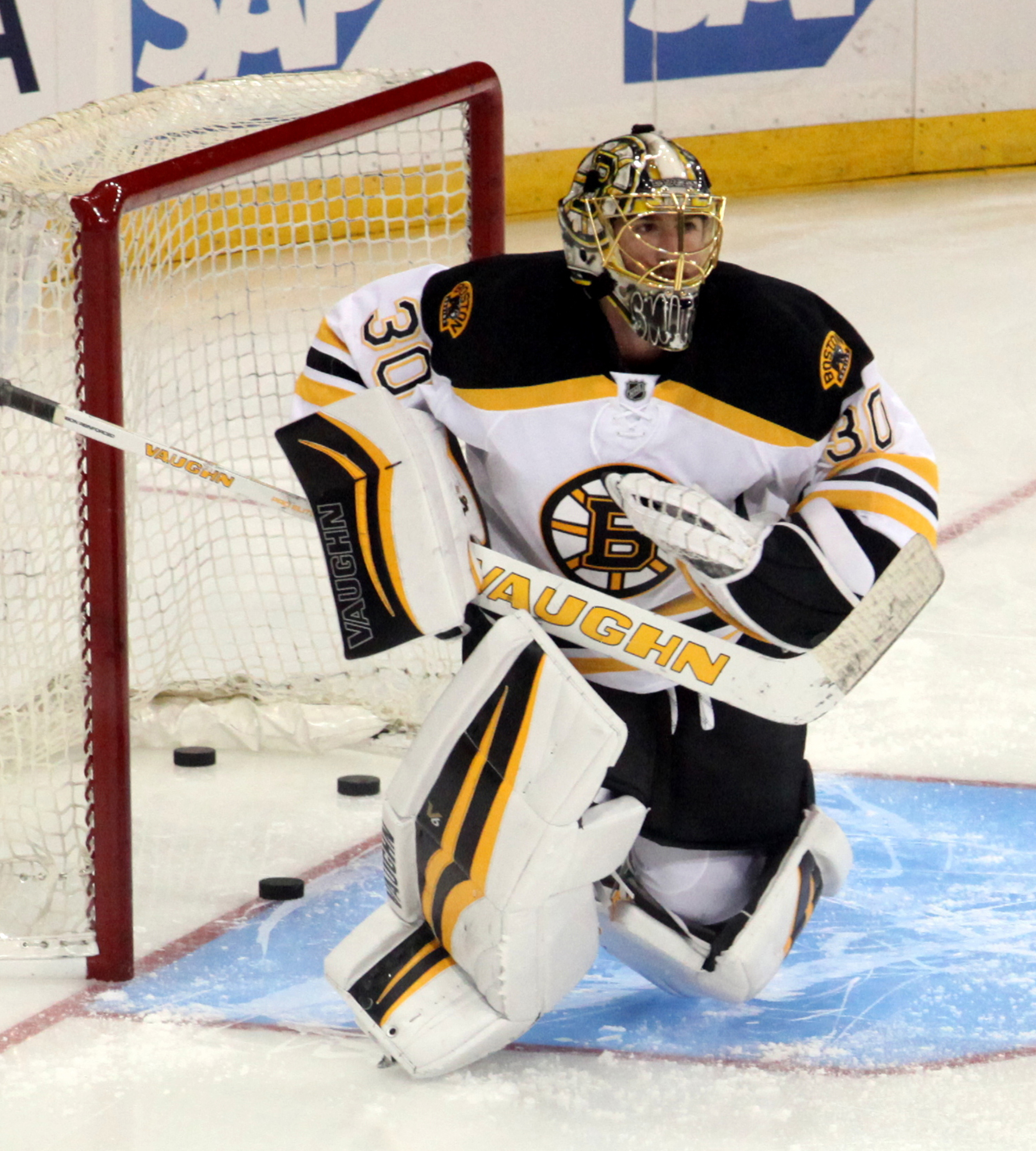
Smith during the 2015 pre-season with the Boston Bruins.

On July 2, 2014, Smith signed a one-year, two-way contract with the Boston Bruins. Smith was sent down to Providence Bruins to be a call-up along with Malcolm Subban for the majority of the season.

On July 1, 2015, the Boston Bruins re-signed Smith to a one-year, two-way contract. With Smith unable to earn the backup role and with the Bruins suffering a surplus of goaltenders in their system, he was assigned on loan to AHL affiliate club of the Minnesota Wild, the Iowa Wild, for the duration of the 2015–16 season on October 6, 2015. On February 6, 2016, Providence's Malcolm Subban was hospitalized after taking a puck to the throat. With Subban ruled out for eight weeks due to this injury, Smith was recalled from his loan with the Iowa Wild to provide Providence with cover. In Subban's absence, Smith was a standout for Providence, posting 13 wins in 20 games and earning his first recall to the NHL, on an emergency basis, on April 9, 2016. He was returned to the AHL for the post-season without featuring for the Bruins.

After the season, Smith left the Bruins organization as a free agent. On July 1, 2016, he signed a one-year, two-way contract to join the Colorado Avalanche. Smith began the 2016–17 season in the AHL with affiliate, the San Antonio Rampage. He was injured in his third game with the Rampage and missed two months of action before returning to post his first win with the Rampage in a 4–2 victory over the Tucson Roadrunners on December 17, 2016. On December 27, Smith was recalled by the Avalanche after an injury to starting goaltender Semyon Varlamov and backed up Calvin Pickard for five games before he was returned to the Rampage on January 5, 2017. With Varlamov suffering a season-ending injury, Smith was recalled on a second occasion on February 9, 2017. He made his NHL debut with the Avalanche, making 37 saves in a 3–2 defeat to the New Jersey Devils on February 14, 2017. In his third start with the Avalanche he received his first NHL win, making 34 saves in the team's 5–3 win over the Buffalo Sabres on February 25, 2017.

As a free agent in the off-season, Smith left the Avalanche to sign a one-year, two-way contract with the Carolina Hurricanes on July 1, 2017. For the following 2017–18 season, Smith was unable to add to his NHL experience, assigned to the AHL affiliate Charlotte Checkers for the duration of the campaign. In 30 games, Smith collected 13 wins and posted a goals against average of 2.71.

At the completion of his contract with the Hurricanes, Smith became a free agent and agreed to sign a one-year AHL contract with the Bridgeport Sound Tigers on July 9, 2018. In the following 2018–19 season, Smith had collected 16 wins through 32 games for the Sound Tigers before he was signed to a two-way contract by the New York Islanders for the remainder of the year on February 24, 2019. In adding depth to the goaltending ranks of the playoff-bound Islanders, Smith would continue to play with their AHL affiliate.

On June 10, 2019, Smith as an impending free agent, signed his first contract abroad, agreeing to a two-year contract with Chinese outfit Kunlun Red Star of the Kontinental Hockey League (KHL). Smith played six seasons with the team, becoming a KHL All-Star twice in 2024 and 2025. Amid the team's relocation to become the Shanghai Dragons, though, Smith's contract was terminated, making him a free agent.

== International play ==
Smith was the starting goalie for the United States men's national junior ice hockey team at the 2008 World Junior Ice Hockey Championships, where they finished 4th.

Due to his stint in China, Smith was called up to represent the China men's national ice hockey team for the 2022 Winter Olympics. According to some sources, he became a Chinese citizen in order to be eligible to represent the nation at the Olympics. Smith's teammate Jake Chelios confirmed that he kept his American citizenship but refused to answer whether he was a naturalized Chinese citizen. While the Olympic Charter stipulates that any athlete competing in the Games must be a national of the country of the NOC which is entering such competitor, the IOC Executive Board has the authority to make certain exceptions of a "general or individual nature", though it is unclear whether this was the case.

During the games, the pinyin version of the Chinese transcription of Smith's name, Jieruimi Shimisi, was used for commentary and statistics records by the IOC.

== Personal ==
Jeremy Smith graduated from Woodhaven High School as part of the class of 2007.

== Career statistics ==
=== Regular season and playoffs ===
			Regular season									Playoffs
Season	Team	League	GP	W	L	OTL	MIN	GA	SO	GAA	SV%	GP	W	L	MIN	GA	SO	GAA	SV%
2005–06	Plymouth Whalers	OHL	5	0	2	0	111	11	0	5.94	.845	—	—	—	—	—	—	—	—
2006–07	Plymouth Whalers	OHL	34	23	6	1	1901	82	4	2.59	.923	3	2	0	149	8	0	3.22	.877
2007–08	Plymouth Whalers	OHL	40	23	13	4	2431	116	3	2.86	.921	4	0	4	224	29	0	7.77	.821
2008–09	Plymouth Whalers	OHL	17	3	9	2	901	72	0	4.79	.873	—	—	—	—	—	—	—	—
2008–09	Niagara IceDogs	OHL	26	12	9	3	1488	79	1	3.18	.913	12	5	5	724	45	1	3.73	.915
2009–10	Cincinnati Cyclones	ECHL	42	23	15	2	2468	108	2	2.63	.899	17	9	7	988	44	1	2.67	.907
2009–10	Milwaukee Admirals	AHL	1	0	0	0	5	0	0	0.00	1.000	—	—	—	—	—	—	—	—
2010–11	Cincinnati Cyclones	ECHL	1	0	0	1	65	3	0	2.78	.900	—	—	—	—	—	—	—	—
2010–11	Milwaukee Admirals	AHL	28	16	8	2	1513	57	2	2.26	.921	13	7	6	843	32	0	2.28	.931
2011–12	Milwaukee Admirals	AHL	56	31	19	2	3284	119	5	2.17	.922	3	0	3	177	11	0	3.73	.866
2012–13	Milwaukee Admirals	AHL	43	19	19	3	2471	114	1	2.77	.907	—	—	—	—	—	—	—	—
2013–14	Springfield Falcons	AHL	38	21	14	3	2179	101	1	2.78	.898	—	—	—	—	—	—	—	—
2014–15	Providence Bruins	AHL	39	22	11	5	2278	78	3	2.05	.933	3	1	2	183	6	0	1.96	.931
2015–16	Iowa Wild	AHL	23	5	14	4	1326	65	0	2.94	.911	—	—	—	—	—	—	—	—
2015–16	Providence Bruins	AHL	20	13	5	2	1129	38	1	2.02	.934	3	0	3	180	8	0	2.66	.905
2016–17	San Antonio Rampage	AHL	17	5	8	0	841	36	0	2.57	.911	—	—	—	—	—	—	—	—
2016–17	Colorado Avalanche	NHL	10	1	6	1	546	32	0	3.52	.888	—	—	—	—	—	—	—	—
2017–18	Charlotte Checkers	AHL	30	13	13	2	1618	73	0	2.71	.902	1	0	0	26	0	0	0.00	1.000
2018–19	Bridgeport Sound Tigers	AHL	43	21	13	4	2363	115	1	2.92	.902	1	0	1	57	2	0	2.09	.941
2019–20	Kunlun Red Star	KHL	32	11	16	4	1846	81	3	2.63	.918	—	—	—	—	—	—	—	—
2020–21	Kunlun Red Star	KHL	17	3	10	1	941	53	0	3.38	.906	—	—	—	—	—	—	—	—
2021–22	Kunlun Red Star	KHL	25	4	18	2	1486	100	0	4.04	.898	—	—	—	—	—	—	—	—
2022–23	Kunlun Red Star	KHL	36	10	24	2	2125	107	2	3.02	.914	—	—	—	—	—	—	—	—
2023–24	Kunlun Red Star	KHL	31	9	17	3	1744	89	2	3.06	.922	—	—	—	—	—	—	—	—
2024–25	Kunlun Red Star	KHL	43	16	18	3	2315	117	4	3.03	.910	—	—	—	—	—	—	—	—
2025–26	Bridgeport Islanders	AHL	5	1	3	1	301	11	1	2.20	.907	—	—	—	—	—	—	—	—
NHL totals			10	1	6	1	546	32	0	3.52	.888	—	—	—	—	—	—	—	—
KHL totals			184	53	103	15	10,457	547	11	3.14	.912	—	—	—	—	—	—	—	—

=== International ===
Year	Team	Event	Result	GP	W	L	OT	MIN	GA	SO	GAA	SV%
2008	United States	WJC	4th	5	4	1	0	300	12	0	2.40	.894
2022	China	OG	12th	3	0	2	0	139	13	0	5.63	.882
Junior totals				5	4	1	0	300	12	0	2.40	.894
Senior totals				3	0	2	0	139	13	0	5.63	.882

== Awards and honors ==
Award	Year
OHL
Dave Pinkney Trophy (Shared with Michal Neuvirth)	2007
CHL Top Prospects Game	2007
ECHL
Playoff MVP (Shared with Robert Mayer)	2010
Kelly Cup (Cincinnati Cyclones)	2010
