= Zach Yuen =

Canadian ice hockey player (born 1993)

- Born: March 3, 1993 (age 33) Vancouver, British Columbia, Canada
- Height: 6 ft 1 in (185 cm)
- Weight: 196 lb (89 kg; 14 st 0 lb)
- Position: Defence Forward
- Shoots: Left
- team Former teams: Free agent Toronto Marlies; Kunlun Red Star
- National team: China
- NHL draft: 119th overall, 2011; Winnipeg Jets
- Playing career: 2013–present

Zachary Yuen (born March 3, 1993, Chinese: 袁俊杰; pinyin: Yuán Jùnjié) is a Chinese-Canadian professional ice hockey defenceman. He is currently an unrestricted free agent who most recently played for Kunlun Red Star of the Kontinental Hockey League (KHL). Yuen was one of the first players of Chinese descent to be drafted in the NHL entry draft.

== Playing career ==
While playing with the Tri-City Americans of the Western Hockey League (WHL), Yuen became the first defenceman of Chinese descent to be drafted in the NHL entry draft after being selected by the Winnipeg Jets in 2011.

After playing two more seasons with the Tri-City Americans, Yuen made his professional debut with the Toronto Marlies of the American Hockey League (AHL) during the 2013–14 season. He played three games with the Marlies before being assigned to the ECHL.

Yuen signed a two-year contract with the Kunlun Red Star of the Kontinental Hockey League (KHL) in 2016, then became the first Chinese player to score for the Red Star during a 1–0 win over the Amur Khabarovsk.

== International play ==
Yuen was called up to represent the China men's national ice hockey team for the 2022 Winter Olympics on January 28, 2022.

== Personal life ==
Yuen was born in Vancouver, British Columbia. His father immigrated from Hong Kong and his mother was born in Vancouver after his maternal grandparents immigrated from Hong Kong.

== Career statistics ==
=== Regular season and playoffs ===
| | | | Regular season | | | | | Playoffs |
| Season | Team | League | GP | G | A | Pts | PIM | GP | G | A | Pts | PIM |
|---|---|---|---|---|---|---|---|---|---|---|---|---|
| 2008–09 | Tri–City Americans | WHL | 4 | 0 | 0 | 0 | 0 | 7 | 1 | 0 | 1 | 2 |
| 2009–10 | Tri–City Americans | WHL | 42 | 1 | 3 | 4 | 19 | 22 | 1 | 1 | 2 | 12 |
| 2010–11 | Tri–City Americans | WHL | 72 | 8 | 24 | 32 | 65 | 10 | 0 | 3 | 3 | 12 |
| 2011–12 | Tri–City Americans | WHL | 66 | 12 | 26 | 38 | 46 | 15 | 1 | 4 | 5 | 18 |
| 2012–13 | Tri–City Americans | WHL | 71 | 9 | 34 | 43 | 58 | 5 | 0 | 1 | 1 | 10 |
| 2013–14 | Toronto Marlies | AHL | 3 | 0 | 0 | 0 | 4 | — | — | — | — | — |
| 2013–14 | Orlando Solar Bears | ECHL | 48 | 1 | 11 | 12 | 30 | — | — | — | — | — |
| 2014–15 | Wheeling Nailers | ECHL | 27 | 3 | 4 | 7 | 16 | — | — | — | — | — |
| 2014–15 | Gwinnett Gladiators | ECHL | 35 | 6 | 10 | 16 | 38 | — | — | — | — | — |
| 2015–16 | Atlanta Gladiators | ECHL | 17 | 1 | 7 | 8 | 10 | — | — | — | — | — |
| 2015–16 | Idaho Steelheads | ECHL | 51 | 3 | 17 | 20 | 48 | 7 | 0 | 1 | 1 | 6 |
| 2016–17 | Kunlun Red Star | KHL | 60 | 3 | 8 | 11 | 42 | 5 | 1 | 0 | 1 | 4 |
| 2017–18 | Kunlun Red Star | KHL | 21 | 2 | 1 | 3 | 18 | — | — | — | — | — |
| 2017–18 | KRS Heilongjiang | VHL | 8 | 0 | 0 | 0 | 4 | — | — | — | — | — |
| 2018–19 | Kunlun Red Star | KHL | 35 | 1 | 1 | 2 | 41 | — | — | — | — | — |
| 2019–20 | KRS BSU Beijing | VHL | 13 | 0 | 4 | 4 | 8 | — | — | — | — | — |
| 2021–22 | Kunlun Red Star | KHL | 29 | 0 | 2 | 2 | 18 | — | — | — | — | — |
| 2023–24 | Kunlun Red Star | KHL | 21 | 0 | 1 | 1 | 4 | — | — | — | — | — |
| KHL totals | | | 166 | 6 | 13 | 19 | 123 | 5 | 1 | 0 | 1 | 4 |

=== International ===
| Year | Team | Event | Result | GP | G | A | Pts | PIM |
|---|---|---|---|---|---|---|---|---|
| 2010 | Canada Pacific | U17 | 5th | 5 | 0 | 1 | 1 | 6 |
| 2022 | China | OG | 12th | 4 | 0 | 0 | 0 | 0 |
| 2022 | China | WC D2A | 27th | 4 | 0 | 3 | 3 | 29 |
| Junior totals | | | | 5 | 0 | 1 | 1 | 6 |
| Senior totals | | | | 8 | 0 | 3 | 3 | 29 |
