= Paris O'Brien =

Canadian-Chinese ice hockey player

- Born: 15 April 2000 (age 26) Coquitlam, British Columbia, Canada
- Height: 6 ft 3 in (191 cm)
- Weight: 181 lb (82 kg; 12 st 13 lb)
- Position: Goaltender
- Catches: Left
- USports team Former teams: Wilfrid Laurier University; Kunlun Red Star
- National team: China
- NHL draft: Undrafted
- Playing career: 2022–present

Paris O'Brien (also known as Yongli Ouban; born 15 April 2000) is a Chinese-Canadian professional ice hockey player for Wilfrid Laurier University of the Canadian University USports.

== Playing career ==
O'Brien was born on 15 April 2000 in Coquitlam, British Columbia, Canada. He was attending South Delta Secondary School when he was recruited by Mike Keenan to join the Kunlun Red Star organization. O'Brien moved to Russia and played nine games in the MHL, Russia’s Junior Hockey League, during the 2017–18 season. He was also selected by Team Latvia's head coach Bob Hartley to be an emergency goaltender for the team during an international tournament. The next season, O’Brien returned to the MHL for 45 games and was also recalled to Kunlun’s minor pro team, KRS-BSU, in the Supreme Hockey League three times.

O'Brien made his international debut for the China men's national ice hockey team at the 2022 Winter Olympics where they placed 12th.
