= 2022 IIHF World Championship Division II =

Ice Hockey world championships

Tournament details
- Host countries: Croatia; Iceland
- Venues: 2 (in 2 host cities)
- Dates: 25–30 April; 18–23 April
- Teams: 10

The 2022 IIHF World Championship Division II was an international ice hockey tournament run by the International Ice Hockey Federation.

The Group A tournament was held in Zagreb, Croatia from 25 to 30 April and the Group B tournament in Reykjavík, Iceland from 18 to 23 April 2022.

After the tournament was cancelled the two previous years due to the COVID-19 pandemic, all teams stayed put in their respective groups.

China won Group A and got promoted to Division IB, while Iceland won Group B and got promoted to Group A.

In order to fill each group of the World Championships back to their normal number of teams, the IIHF made the decision following the tournament not to relegate Israel or Mexico, who finished last in Groups A and B respectively, but instead to promote the Netherlands and Georgia, the runners-up of each group.

== Group A tournament ==
2022 IIHF World Championship Division II A

Tournament details
- Host country: Croatia
- Venue: 1 (in 1 host city)
- Dates: 25–30 April
- Teams: 5

Tournament statistics
- Games played: 10
- Goals scored: 70 (7 per game)
- Attendance: 134 (13 per game)
- Scoring leader(s): (China) Fu Shuai (Netherlands) Nick Verschuren (10 points)

Official website
- Website

=== Participants ===
Team	Qualification
Netherlands	Placed 6th in Division I B last edition and was relegated.
Croatia	Host, placed 2nd in Division II A last edition.
~~Australia~~	Placed 3rd in Division II A last edition.
Spain	Placed 4th in Division II A last edition.
China	Placed 5th in Division II A last edition.
Israel	Placed 1st in Division II B last edition and was promoted.

=== Match officials ===
Three referees and five linesmen are selected for the tournament.

Referees	Linesmen
(Denmark) Martin Christensen; (Lithuania) Vitalijus Sevruk; (Poland) Bartosz Kaczmarek	(Croatia) Tomislav Grozaj; (Croatia) Marko Šaković; (Hungary) Barnabás Fényi; (Slovakia) Ľudovít Šoltés; (Slovenia) Anže Bergant

=== Standings ===
Pos	Team	Pld	W	OTW	OTL	L	GF	GA	GD	Pts	Promotion or relegation
1	China (P)	4	4	0	0	0	28	4	+24	12	Promoted to the 2023 Division I B
2	Netherlands (P)	4	3	0	0	1	19	10	+9	9	Promoted to the 2023 Division I B
3	Croatia (H)	4	1	1	0	2	9	12	−3	5	
4	Spain	4	1	0	1	2	10	12	−2	4	
5	Israel	4	0	0	0	4	4	32	−28	0	
6	Australia (Note: Australia withdrew their team on 22 January 2022 because of the COVID-19 pandemic.)	0	0	0	0	0	0	0	0	0	Withdrawn

Source: IIHF
Rules for classification: 1) points; 2) head-to-head points; 3) head-to-head goal difference; 4) head-to-head number of goals scored; 5) result against closest best-ranked team outside tied teams; 6) result against second-best ranked team outside tied teams; 7) seeding before tournament.
(H) Host; (P) Promoted

=== Results ===
All times are local (UTC+2)

25 April 2022; 16:00	Netherlands	5–3 (2–0, 2–1, 1–2)	Spain	Dvorana Velesajam, Zagreb; Attendance: 10

Game reference

Martijn Oosterwijk
Goalies
Raul Barbo
Ignacio García
Referee:
(Poland) Bartosz Kaczmarek
Linesmen:
(Hungary) Barnabás Fényi
(Croatia) Tomislav Grozaj

Van der Schuit (Stempher, Verschuren) – 03:16	1–0
Van der Schuit (Stempher, Verschuren) (PP) – 10:38	2–0
Vogelaar (Verschuren, Van der Schuit) (PP) – 20:34	3–0
Verschuren (Van der Schuit) – 22:22	4–0
	4–1	28:03 – Lasuen (Encinar)
	4–2	49:43 – Capillas (Baldris)
	4–3	50:33 – González (Fernández) (PP)
Collard (Heutmekers, Van Gorp) – 54:52	5–3

6 min
Penalties
6 min
23
Shots
24

25 April 2022; 19:45	Israel	1–5 (0–1, 0–2, 1–2)	Croatia	Dvorana Velesajam, Zagreb; Attendance: 13

Game reference

Nir Tichon
Goalies
Vilim Rosandić
Referee:
(Denmark) Martin Christensen
Linesmen:
(Croatia) Marko Šaković
(Slovakia) Ľudovít Šoltés

	0–1	05:33 – Bebek (Kramarić, Marinković)
	0–2	20:47 – Dobrić (Tadić, Rosandić)
	0–3	33:50 – Puzić (Šakić, Smolec) (PP)
	0–4	45:12 – Puzić (Fičur, Šakić)
Sherbatov (Ben Tov) – 51:46	1–4
	1–5	59:40 – Šakić (Fičur, Smolec) (EN)

8 min
Penalties
6 min
22
Shots
84

26 April 2022; 17:00	China	14–1 (4–0, 5–0, 5–1)	Israel	Dvorana Velesajam, Zagreb; Attendance: 15

Game reference

Yongli Ouban
Goalies
Yehonatan Reisinger
Referee:
(Lithuania) Vitalijus Sevruk
Linesmen:
(Slovenia) Anže Bergant
(Hungary) Barnabás Fényi

Fu S. (Fu J., Luo) – 02:56	1–0
Fu S. (Jieke) – 03:49	2–0
Ruian (Ye, Fu J.) (PP) – 09:07	3–0
Fu J. (Fu S., Luo) – 15:30	4–0
Fu S. (Fu J., Jieke) – 25:01	5–0
Yan J. (Chen) – 28:55	6–0
Yan J. (Guo, Liu) – 29:44	7–0
Jieke (Wang) – 32:09	8–0
Jian (Zhang, Yuan) – 32:28	9–0
Luo (Fu S., Zheng) – 45:15	10–0
Shen (Wang, Ye) – 52:17	11–0
	11–1	53:20 – Spektor
Yan J. (Guo) – 55:06	12–1
Luo (Fu J., Fu S.) – 58:29	13–1
Yan J. (Yuan) – 59:07	14–1

6 min
Penalties
4 min
56
Shots
18

27 April 2022; 16:00	China	5–1 (2–0, 1–1, 2–0)	Netherlands	Dvorana Velesajam, Zagreb; Attendance: 10

Game reference

Yongli Ouban
Goalies
Ruud Leeuwesteijn
Referee:
(Denmark) Martin Christensen
Linesmen:
(Croatia) Marko Šaković
(Slovakia) Ľudovít Šoltés

Jian (Fu S., Jieke) – 17:43	1–0
Shen (Ruian, Wang) – 19:50	2–0
Ye (Wang, Jieke) – 25:02	3–0
	3–1	36:17 – Verschuren (Muller, Van der Schuit) (PP)
Wang (Ruian) – 46:36	4–1
Fu S. (Fu J.) – 57:04	5–1

6 min
Penalties
8 min
52
Shots
17

27 April 2022; 19:45	Croatia	1–0 GWS (0–0, 0–0, 0–0) (OT: 0–0) (SO: 1–0)	Spain	Dvorana Velesajam, Zagreb; Attendance: 14

Game reference
Vilim Rosandić	Goalies	Ignacio García	Referee: (Lithuania) Vitalijus Sevruk; Linesmen: (Slovenia) Anže Bergant (Croatia) Tomislav Grozaj
Kanaet; Dobrić; Smolec (miss); Fičur (miss); Jarčov (miss); Puzić (miss); Šakić	Shootout	Granell; (miss) Capillas; (miss) Cerdà; Mendizábal; (miss) Carbonell; (miss) Granell; (miss) Mendizábal	Referee: (Lithuania) Vitalijus Sevruk; Linesmen: (Slovenia) Anže Bergant (Croatia) Tomislav Grozaj
8 min	Penalties	8 min	Referee: (Lithuania) Vitalijus Sevruk; Linesmen: (Slovenia) Anže Bergant (Croatia) Tomislav Grozaj
35	Shots	31	Referee: (Lithuania) Vitalijus Sevruk; Linesmen: (Slovenia) Anže Bergant (Croatia) Tomislav Grozaj

28 April 2022; 19:45	Israel	0–7 (0–1, 0–3, 0–3)	Netherlands	Dvorana Velesajam, Zagreb; Attendance: 6

Game reference

Nir Tichon
Goalies
Martijn Oosterwijk
Referee:
(Poland) Bartosz Kaczmarek
Linesmen:
(Croatia) Tomislav Grozaj
(Croatia) Marko Šaković

0–1	16:38 – Verkiel (Van der Schuit, Stempher)
0–2	20:06 – Stempher (Van der Schuit, Verschuren)
0–3	24:01 – Hofland
0–4	37:16 – Verschuren (Vogelaar, Stempher) (PP)
0–5	47:04 – Heutmekers (Doop, Collard)
0–6	49:37 – Heutmekers (Collard)
0–7	56:50 – Vogelaar (Stempher, Muller)

10 min
Penalties
14 min
18
Shots
68

29 April 2022; 16:00	Spain	6–2 (1–0, 4–0, 1–2)	Israel	Dvorana Velesajam, Zagreb; Attendance: 9

Game reference

Ignacio García
Goalies
Yehonatan Reisinger
Referee:
(Denmark) Martin Christensen
Linesmen:
(Croatia) Tomislav Grozaj
(Slovakia) Ľudovít Šoltés

Fernández (Torralba, Rubio) – 19:25	1–0
Granell (Baldris, Fuentes) (PP) – 21:42	2–0
Lasuen (Rubio, Torralba) – 26:05	3–0
Carbonell (Cerdà, Baldris) – 28:37	4–0
Carbonell (Cerdà, Baldris) – 30:14	5–0
	5–1	40:28 – Milner (Sherbatov, Kozhevnikov) (SH)
Mendizábal (González) – 41:33	6–1
	6–2	51:17 – Spektor Sherbatov, Milner)

4 min
Penalties
12 min
77
Shots
9

29 April 2022; 19:45	Croatia	1–5 (0–0, 0–4, 1–1)	China	Dvorana Velesajam, Zagreb; Attendance: 22

Game reference

Vito Nikolić
Goalies
Yongli Ouban
Referee:
(Poland) Bartosz Kaczmarek
Linesmen:
(Slovenia) Anže Bergant
(Hungary) Barnabás Fényi

	0–1	25:09 – Shen (Wang, Ye)
	0–2	29:27 – Jian (Zhang, Yuan)
	0–3	31:04 – Fu J. (Jieke) (PP)
	0–4	36:34 – Fu J. (Zhou, Ruian)
	0–5	44:25 – Jieke (Jian, Zhou)
Fičur (Šakić, Tadić) – 52:36	1–5

6 min
Penalties
4 min
23
Shots
40

30 April 2022; 16:00	Spain	1–4 (1–0, 0–1, 0–3)	China	Dvorana Velesajam, Zagreb; Attendance: 12

Game reference

Raul Barbo
Goalies
Yongli Ouban
Referee:
(Denmark) Martin Christensen
Linesmen:
(Hungary) Barnabás Fényi
(Croatia) Marko Šaković

Capillas (Granell, Meyerson) – 07:23	1–0
	1–1	38:25 – Ye (Zhou)
	1–2	44:17 – Luo (Jieke, Fu S.)
	1–3	44:57 – Ye (Fu J., Ruian) (PP)
	1–4	58:59 – Luo (Fu J., Fu S.) (EN)

2 min
Penalties
33 min
33
Shots
34

30 April 2022; 19:45	Netherlands	6–2 (2–0, 2–2, 2–0)	Croatia	Dvorana Velesajam, Zagreb; Attendance: 23

Game reference

Ruud Leeuwesteijn
Goalies
Vilim Rosandić
Referee:
(Lithuania) Vitalijus Sevruk
Linesmen:
(Slovenia) Anže Bergant
(Slovakia) Ľudovít Šoltés

Van der Schuit (Van Gorp) – 03:14	1–0
Stempher (Verschuren, Van der Schuit) (PP) – 11:09	2–0
	2–1	30:54 – Marinković (Dobrić, Brenčun) (PP)
Stempher (Verschuren) – 31:26	3–1
Verschuren (Muller, Verkiel) – 33:15	4–1
	4–2	37:41 – Idzan
Verkiel (Sikma) (SH) – 49:53	5–2
Collard (Heutmekers, Verkiel) – 55:36	6–2

10 min
Penalties
8 min
38
Shots
30

=== Statistics ===
==== Scoring leaders ====
List shows the top skaters sorted by points, then goals.

Player	GP	G	A	Pts	+/−	PIM	POS
(China) Fu Shuai	4	4	6	10	+10	2	F
(Netherlands) Nick Verschuren	4	4	6	10	+6	2	F
(China) Fu Jiang	4	3	7	10	+11	0	F
(Netherlands) Raymond van der Schuit	4	3	6	9	+6	4	F
(Netherlands) Danny Stempher	4	3	6	8	+6	0	F
(China) Jieke Kailiaosi	4	2	6	8	+11	2	D
(China) Luo Jia	4	4	2	6	+9	0	F
(China) Ye Jinguang	4	3	3	6	+5	0	F
(China) Wang Taile	4	1	5	6	+6	0	F
(China) Ruian Sipulaoer	4	1	4	5	+8	0	D

GP = Games played; G = Goals; A = Assists; Pts = Points; +/− = Plus/minus; PIM = Penalties in minutes; POS = Position
Source: IIHF.com

==== Goaltending leaders ====
Only the top five goaltenders, based on save percentage, who have played at least 40% of their team's minutes, are included in this list.

Player	TOI	GA	GAA	SA	Sv%	SO
(China) Yongli Ouban	240:00	4	1.00	91	95.60	0
(Spain) Ignacio García	161:18	3	1.12	56	94.64	1
(Netherlands) Martijn Oosterwijk	120:00	3	1.50	42	92.86	1
(Israel) Nir Tichon	117:59	11	5.59	151	92.72	0
(Croatia) Vilim Rosandić	185:00	7	2.27	91	92.31	1

TOI = time on ice (minutes:seconds); SA = shots against; GA = goals against; GAA = goals against average; Sv% = save percentage; SO = shutouts
Source: IIHF.com

=== Awards ===
Position	Player
Goaltender	(Croatia) Vilim Rosandić
Defenceman	(Netherlands) Jordy Verkiel
Forward	(China) Fu Jiang

== Group B tournament ==
2022 IIHF World Championship Division II B

Tournament details
- Host country: Iceland
- Venue: 1 (in 1 host city)
- Dates: 18–23 April
- Teams: 5

Tournament statistics
- Games played: 10
- Goals scored: 83 (8.3 per game)
- Attendance: 2,942 (294 per game)
- Scoring leader: (Georgia (country)) Nikita Bukiya (11 points)

Official website
- Website

=== Participants ===
Team	Qualification
Belgium	Placed 6th in Division II A last edition and was relegated.
Iceland	Host, placed 2nd in Division II B last edition.
~~New Zealand~~	Placed 3rd in Division II B last edition.
Georgia	Placed 4th in Division II B last edition.
Mexico	Placed 5th in Division II B last edition.
Bulgaria	Placed 1st in Division III last edition and was promoted.

=== Match officials ===
Three referees and five linesmen were selected for the tournament.

Referees	Linesmen
(France) Julien Peyre; (United Kingdom) Andrew Dalton; (Netherlands) Jos Korte	(Germany) Wayne Gerth; (United Kingdom) Andrew Cook; (Iceland) Óli Gunnarsson; (Iceland) Sindri Gunnarsson; (Norway) Herman Johansen

=== Standings ===
Pos	Team	Pld	W	OTW	OTL	L	GF	GA	GD	Pts	Promotion or relegation
1	Iceland (H, P)	4	4	0	0	0	25	7	+18	12	Promoted to the 2023 Division II A
2	Georgia (P)	4	3	0	0	1	21	11	+10	9	Promoted to the 2023 Division II A
3	Belgium	4	2	0	0	2	22	8	+14	6	
4	Bulgaria	4	1	0	0	3	11	33	−22	3	
5	Mexico	4	0	0	0	4	4	24	−20	0	
6	New Zealand (Note: New Zealand withdrew their team on 2 February 2022 due to the COVID-19 pandemic.)	0	0	0	0	0	0	0	0	0	Withdrawn

Source: IIHF
Rules for classification: 1) points; 2) head-to-head points; 3) head-to-head goal difference; 4) head-to-head number of goals scored; 5) result against closest best-ranked team outside tied teams; 6) result against second-best ranked team outside tied teams; 7) seeding before tournament.
(H) Host; (P) Promoted

=== Results ===
All times are local (UTC±0)

18 April 2022; 16:30	Bulgaria	2–10 (1–2, 0–4, 1–4)	Iceland	Laugardalshöll, Reykjavík; Attendance: 500

Game reference

Dimitar Dimitrov
Andrea Karabadjakov
Goalies
Jakob Jóhannesson
Referee:
(United Kingdom) Andrew Dalton
Linesmen:
(Germany) Wayne Gerth
(Norway) Herman Johansen

	0–1	04:00 – Atlason (Arnarsson, Kristveigarson)
	0–2	13:58 – Arason (Leifsson) (PP)
Georgiev (Vasilev) – 16:43	1–2
	1–3	25:50 – Sigurðsson (Sigurðarson)
	1–4	27:01 – Mikaelsson (Leifsson, Sigrúnarson) (PP)
	1–5	32:13 – Skúlason
	1–6	37:04 – Orongan (Sigurðsson, Sigurðarson)
Dikov (Georgiev) – 49:58	2–6
	2–7	55:46 – Sigurðarson (Orongan, Arnarsson) (PP)
	2–8	56:58 – Leifsson (Sigrúnarson, Mikaelsson)
	2–9	58:34 – Jóhannsson (Rúnarsson, Eggertsson) (PP)
	2–10	59:46 – Sigurðsson (Skúlason, Sigurðarson) (PP)

37 min
Penalties
12 min
18
Shots
56

18 April 2022; 20:00	Belgium	3–4 (2–3, 1–0, 0–1)	Georgia	Laugardalshöll, Reykjavík; Attendance: 70

Game reference

Kevin Van Looveren
Goalies
Mikhail Fofanov
Referee:
(Netherlands) Jos Korte
Linesmen:
(Iceland) Óli Gunnarsson
(Iceland) Sindri Gunnarsson

	0–1	03:00 – Bukiya (Romanov, Kurbatov) (PP)
Blockx (James) (PP) – 08:06	1–1
Henry (De Smet, Verelst) (PP) – 09:12	2–1
	2–2	12:11 – Kireev (Belomoin, Potazhevich) (PP)
	2–3	19:22 – Karelin (Kurbatov) (PP2)
De Smet (Verelst, Goris) – 34:43	3–3
	3–4	51:03 – Romanov (Karelin, Kurbatov) (PP)

16 min
Penalties
6 min
36
Shots
29

19 April 2022; 18:00	Mexico	2–6 (2–2, 0–4, 0–0)	Bulgaria	Laugardalshöll, Reykjavík; Attendance: 100

Game reference

Marcello de Antuñano
Richard Albrecht
Goalies
Dimitar Dimitrov
Referee:
(France) Julien Peyre
Linesmen:
(United Kingdom) Andrew Cook
(Norway) Herman Johansen

Majul (Samperio) – 06:40	1–0
	1–1	07:09 – Vasilev (Dikov, Georgiev) (PP)
Chávez (Pérez, Ugarte) (PP) – 13:13	2–1
	2–2	14:51 – Dikov (Vasilev)
	2–3	26:36 – M. Nikolov (Atanasov) (PP)
	2–4	30:48 – M. Nikolov (Atanasov)
	2–5	33:13 – Nakov (Atanasov, M. Nikolov)
	2–6	37:39 – Georgiev (Dikov)

8 min
Penalties
12 min
34
Shots
29

20 April 2022; 16:30	Iceland	5–2 (1–0, 3–1, 1–1)	Georgia	Laugardalshöll, Reykjavík; Attendance: 357

Game reference

Jóhann Ragnarsson
Goalies
Mikhail Fofanov
Andrey Ilyenko
Referee:
(France) Julien Peyre
Linesmen:
(United Kingdom) Andrew Cook
(Iceland) Sindri Gunnarsson

Arnarsson (Skúlason) – 05:52	1–0
Arason (Leifsson, Mikaelsson) (PP) – 20:29	2–0
	2–1	24:54 – Kireev (Bukiya, Potazhevich) (PP)
Sigurðarson (Sigurðsson) (PP2) – 27:04	3–1
Mikaelsson (Rúnarsson, Arason) (PP) – 28:04	4–1
	4–2	46:24 – Karelin (Kozyulin, Potazhevich) (PP)
Sigurðarson (Orongan) (PP) – 51:48	5–2

21 min
Penalties
49 min
48
Shots
32

20 April 2022; 20:00	Mexico	1–6 (0–1, 0–4, 1–1)	Belgium	Laugardalshöll, Reykjavík

Game reference

Richard Albrecht
Marcello de Antuñano
Goalies
Arne Waumans
Referee:
(United Kingdom) Andrew Dalton
Linesmen:
(Germany) Wayne Gerth
(Iceland) Óli Gunnarsson

	0–1	08:49 – Coolen (De Ceuster)
	0–2	21:13 – De Ceuster (Darques)
	0–3	24:20 – Van Den Bosch (Paulus, Neven)
	0–4	30:39 – James (Versin)
	0–5	32:10 – Van Den Bosch (Kolodziejczyk, Goris)
Díaz (Zuverza, Ortiz) – 47:12	1–5
	1–6	51:09 – Versin (Blockx, Neven)

14 min
Penalties
8 min
17
Shots
54

21 April 2022; 18:00	Bulgaria	0–11 (0–3, 0–3, 0–5)	Belgium	Laugardalshöll, Reykjavík; Attendance: 37

Game reference

Dimitar Dimitrov
Andrea Karabadjakov
Goalies
Arne Waumans
Referee:
(United Kingdom) Andrew Dalton
Linesmen:
(Germany) Wayne Gerth
(Iceland) Óli Gunnarsson

0–1	06:11 – James (Versin)
0–2	12:38 – Neven (Coolen, Blockx) (PP)
0–3	19:55 – Henry (Bogaerts, Verelst)
0–4	26:39 – De Smet (Verelst)
0–5	31:52 – De Smet (Goris, Henry) (PP)
0–6	38:04 – Cuylaerts (De Ceuster, Coolen)
0–7	44:32 – De Ceuster (Goris, Coolen)
0–8	52:36 – Coolen (James, Neven) (PP)
0–9	56:42 – James (Neven, Coolen) (PP2)
0–10	59:20 – Coolen (Boni, Van Den Bosch) (PP)
0–11	59:52 – Kolodziejczyk

16 min
Penalties
4 min
12
Shots
59

22 April 2022; 16:30	Georgia	10–3 (2–1, 1–2, 7–0)	Bulgaria	Laugardalshöll, Reykjavík; Attendance: 37

Game reference

Mikhail Fofanov
Andrey Ilyenko
Goalies
Dimitar Dimitrov
Andrea Karabadjakov
Referee:
(United Kingdom) Andrew Dalton
Linesmen:
(United Kingdom) Andrew Cook
(Germany) Wayne Gerth

Bukiya (Kochkin, Kireev) – 05:16	1–0
	1–1	06:13 – Vasilev (Dikov)
Karelin (Romanov) – 19:14	2–1
	2–2	20:38 – Georgiev (Atanasov)
Kharizov (Shvetsov) – 21:54	3–2
	3–3	35:27 – Vasilev (Dikov, Georgiev) (PP)
Karelin (Bukiya) – 49:30	4–3
Karelin – 50:56	5–3
Bukiya (Karelin) – 51:12	6–3
Bukiya (Romanov, Tsomaia) – 51:32	7–3
Vasilchenko (Kochkin, Kharizov) – 52:08	8–3
Karelin (Bukiya) – 52:25	9–3
Bukiya (Karelin) – 58:55	10–3

33 min
Penalties
53 min
71
Shots
32

22 April 2022; 20:00	Iceland	7–1 (2–0, 2–1, 3–0)	Mexico	Laugardalshöll, Reykjavík; Attendance: 678

Game reference

Jakob Jóhannesson
Goalies
Richard Albrecht
Referee:
(Netherlands) Jos Korte
Linesmen:
(Iceland) Óli Gunnarsson
(Norway) Herman Johansen

Orongan (Sigurðarson) – 03:46	1–0
Atlason (Sigurðarson, Arnarsson) (PP) – 19:56	2–0
Sigrúnarson (Pálsson, Leifsson) – 23:28	3–0
Leifsson (Arason, Mikaelsson) (PP) – 29:32	4–0
	4–1	39:40 – Majul (Pérez, Ortiz) (PP)
Kristveigarson (Pálsson, Arnarsson) – 45:27	5–1
Rúnarsson (Leifsson, Mikaelsson) (PP) – 46:20	6–1
Mikaelsson (Sigrúnarson, Leifsson) – 56:59	7–1

8 min
Penalties
10 min
52
Shots
29

23 April 2022; 16:30	Georgia	5–0 (3–0, 2–0, 0–0)	Mexico	Laugardalshöll, Reykjavík; Attendance: 43

Game reference

Mikhail Fofanov
Goalies
Marcello de Antuñano
Referee:
(France) Julien Peyre
Linesmen:
(Iceland) Óli Gunnarsson
(Iceland) Sindri Gunnarsson

Bukiya (Karelin) – 00:52	1–0
Belomoin (Karelin, Bukiya) – 13:38	2–0
Bukiya (Karelin, Belomoin) – 19:59	3–0
Kurbatov (Shvetsov) – 33:35	4–0
Potazhevich (Shvetsov, Kharizov) – 39:04	5–0

8 min
Penalties
14 min
59
Shots
25

23 April 2022; 20:00	Belgium	2–3 (0–0, 1–2, 1–1)	Iceland	Laugardalshöll, Reykjavík; Attendance: 1,120

Game reference

Arne Waumans
Goalies
Jóhann Ragnarsson
Referee:
(United Kingdom) Andrew Dalton
Linesmen:
(United Kingdom) Andrew Cook
(Norway) Herman Johansen

De Ceuster (Coolen) – 27:55	1–0
	1–1	30:51 – Orongan (Arason, Ragnarsson)
	1–2	37:03 – Skúlason (Arason)
	1–3	54:03 – Orongan (Sigurðarson, Arnarsson) (PP)
Neven (Verelst, James) (PP, EA) – 57:26	2–3

4 min
Penalties
6 min
46
Shots
26

=== Statistics ===
==== Scoring leaders ====
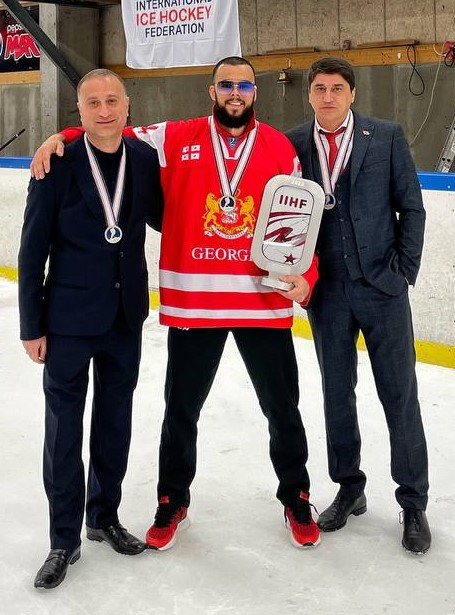
Ivan Karelin of Georgia (centre) finished second in scoring with 11 points.

List shows the top skaters sorted by points, then goals.

Player	GP	G	A	Pts	+/−	PIM	POS
(Georgia (country)) Nikita Bukiya	4	7	4	11	+9	4	F
(Georgia (country)) Ivan Karelin	4	5	6	11	+6	0	F
(Iceland) Björn Sigurðarson	4	3	6	9	+4	2	F
(Belgium) Ben Coolen	4	3	5	8	+4	0	F
(Iceland) Johann Leifsson	4	2	6	8	+4	6	F
(Iceland) Andri Mikaelsson	4	3	4	7	+4	0	F
(Iceland) Axel Orongan	4	4	2	6	+4	6	F
(Belgium) Alec James	4	3	3	6	+3	4	F
(Iceland) Gunnar Arason	4	2	4	6	+3	0	D
(Belgium) Frank Neven	4	2	4	6	+3	4	D

GP = Games played; G = Goals; A = Assists; Pts = Points; +/− = Plus/minus; PIM = Penalties in minutes; POS = Position
Source: IIHF.com

==== Goaltending leaders ====
Only the top five goaltenders, based on save percentage, who have played at least 40% of their team's minutes, are included in this list.

Player	TOI	GA	GAA	SA	Sv%	SO
(Iceland) Jóhann Ragnarsson	120:00	4	2.00	78	94.87	0
(Iceland) Jakob Jóhannesson	120:00	3	1.50	47	93.62	0
(Belgium) Arne Waumans	176:32	4	1.36	55	92.73	1
(Georgia (country)) Mikhail Fofanov	187:26	8	2.56	105	92.38	1
(Mexico) Marcello de Antuñano	113:13	11	5.83	89	87.64	0

TOI = time on ice (minutes:seconds); SA = shots against; GA = goals against; GAA = goals against average; Sv% = save percentage; SO = shutouts
Source: IIHF.com

=== Awards ===
Position	Player
Goaltender	(Iceland) Jóhann Ragnarsson
Defenceman	(Belgium) Frank Neven
Forward	(Iceland) Johann Leifsson
