= Ryan Sproul =

Canadian ice hockey player (born 1993)

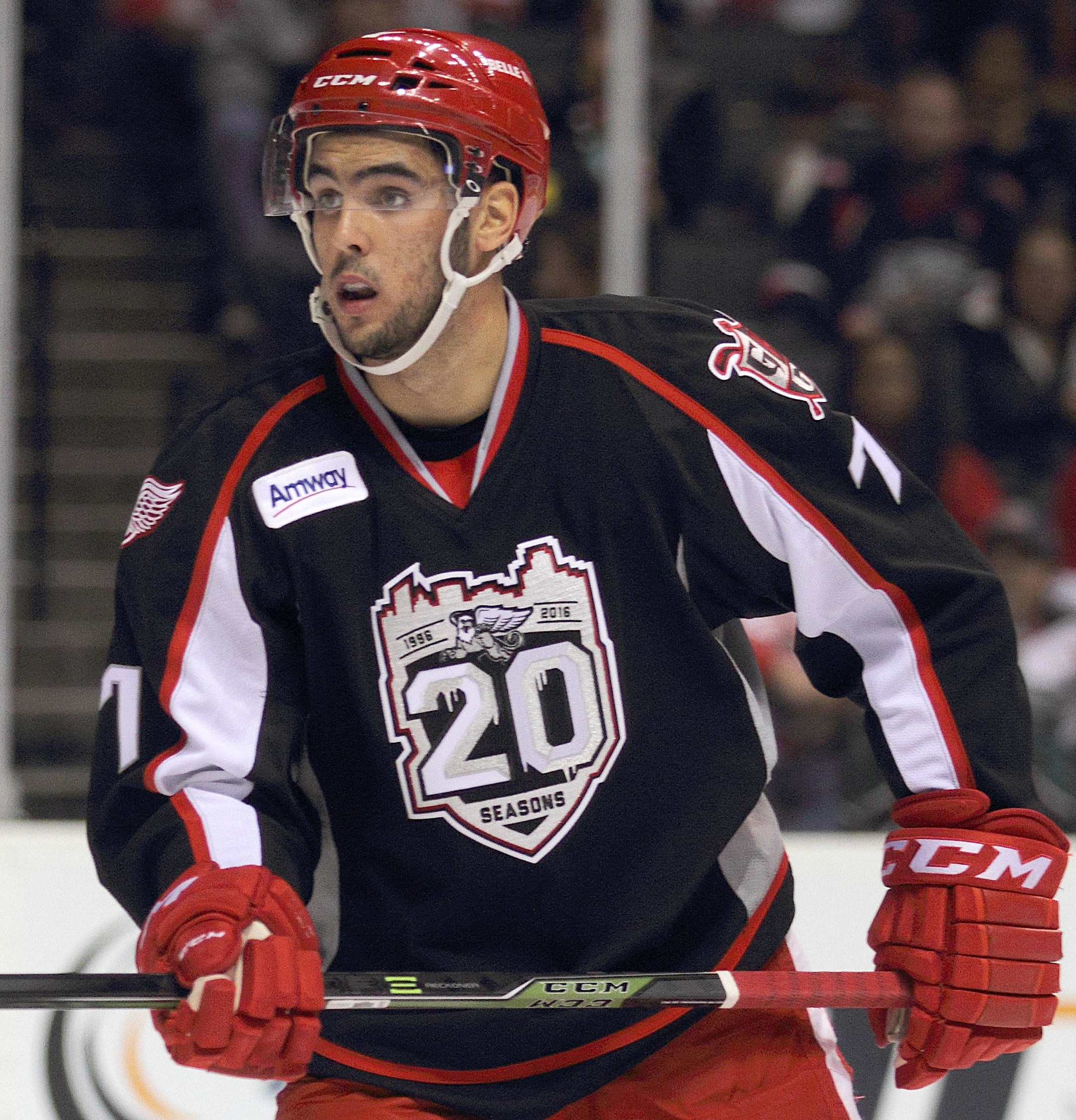
- Sproul with the Grand Rapids Griffins in 2015
- Born: January 13, 1993 (age 33) Mississauga, Ontario, Canada
- Height: 6 ft 4 in (193 cm)
- Weight: 200 lb (91 kg; 14 st 4 lb)
- Position: Defence
- Shoots: Right
- Slovak team Former teams: HK Poprad; Detroit Red Wings; New York Rangers; Kunlun Red Star
- National team: China
- NHL draft: 55th overall, 2011; Detroit Red Wings
- Playing career: 2013–present

Ryan Sproul (born January 13, 1993), is a Canadian-born professional ice hockey defenceman. Born in Canada, he is currently playing for HK Poprad of the Slovak Extraliga.

He represented China at the 2022 Winter Olympics. Sproul was drafted 55th overall by the Detroit Red Wings in the 2011 NHL entry draft.

== Playing career ==
=== Junior ===
Following his first season with the Sault Ste. Marie Greyhounds of the Ontario Hockey League (OHL), Sproul was selected in the second round, 55th overall by the Detroit Red Wings in the 2011 NHL entry draft.

During the 2011-12 season, Sproul was the third-leading scorer for the Greyhounds and was third amongst all OHL defensemen with 54 points. Sproul recorded 23 goals and 31 assists in 61 games for the Greyhounds.

During the 2012–13 OHL season, Sproul was the Greyhounds' second-leading scorer and led all OHL defensemen with 66 points. Sproul recorded 20 goals and 46 assists in 50 games. Sproul was rewarded for his outstanding play during the season by being named to the OHL's First All-Star Team. Sproul was awarded the Max Kaminsky Trophy as the most outstanding defenceman in the Ontario Hockey League.

=== Professional ===
On March 25, 2012, the Red Wings signed Sproul to a three-year entry-level contract.

After the Greyhounds were eliminated from the playoffs, Sproul joined the Grand Rapids Griffins for two regular-season games, making his AHL debut on April 20, 2013, in a game against the Lake Erie Monsters.

During the 2013–14 season, in his first full season with the Griffins, Sproul was the second-highest scoring defenseman on the team, recording 11 goals and 21 assists in 72 games. On April 13, 2014, Sproul made his NHL debut for the Detroit Red Wings in a game against the St. Louis Blues.

On September 23, 2016, the Red Wings re-signed Sproul to a two-year contract. On October 3, 2017, Sproul was assigned to the Grand Rapids Griffins. On October 21, 2017, Sproul was traded to the New York Rangers in exchange for Matt Puempel. He was initially assigned to the Rangers' AHL affiliate, the Hartford Wolf Pack, and contributed with 10 goals and 25 points in 44 games. He was later recalled to play out the remaining season with the Rangers, collecting 5 points in 16 games.

As an unrestricted free agent, Sproul was unable to sign an NHL contract over the summer. He was invited to attend the Calgary Flames' training camp on a professional tryout. After appearing in three preseason games, he was released by the Flames on September 26. On October 14, Sproul signed a professional tryout with the Toronto Marlies. After one game, Sproul was released from his tryout. He immediately signed another tryout contract, this time with the Laval Rocket, on October 25. Sproul appeared in 11 games with the Rocket, producing 1 goal and 5 points before he was released from his tryout on November 29, 2018. On December 4, Sproul joined his third AHL club for the season, securing an AHL contract for the remainder of the campaign with the Hershey Bears, affiliate to the Washington Capitals.

== International play ==
Due to his stint in China, Sproul was called up to represent the China men's national ice hockey team for the 2022 Winter Olympics on January 28, 2022.

== Career statistics ==
=== Regular season and playoffs ===
			Regular season					Playoffs
Season	Team	League	GP	G	A	Pts	PIM	GP	G	A	Pts	PIM
2009–10	Bramalea Blues	OJHL	7	0	1	1	6	—	—	—	—	—
2009–10	Vaughan Vipers	OJHL	8	1	1	2	0	2	0	0	0	0
2010–11	Vaughan Vipers	OJHL	3	1	2	3	4	—	—	—	—	—
2010–11	Sault Ste. Marie Greyhounds	OHL	61	14	19	33	36	—	—	—	—	—
2011–12	Sault Ste. Marie Greyhounds	OHL	61	23	31	54	53	—	—	—	—	—
2012–13	Sault Ste. Marie Greyhounds	OHL	50	20	46	66	45	6	2	3	5	0
2012–13	Grand Rapids Griffins	AHL	2	0	0	0	2	—	—	—	—	—
2013–14	Grand Rapids Griffins	AHL	72	11	21	32	49	10	2	3	5	4
2013–14	Detroit Red Wings	NHL	1	0	0	0	0	—	—	—	—	—
2014–15	Grand Rapids Griffins	AHL	66	5	19	24	26	5	0	0	0	0
2015–16	Grand Rapids Griffins	AHL	75	12	23	35	22	9	2	7	9	8
2016–17	Detroit Red Wings	NHL	27	1	6	7	6	—	—	—	—	—
2017–18	Grand Rapids Griffins	AHL	5	1	3	4	2	—	—	—	—	—
2017–18	Hartford Wolf Pack	AHL	44	10	15	25	28	—	—	—	—	—
2017–18	New York Rangers	NHL	16	1	4	5	6	—	—	—	—	—
2018–19	Toronto Marlies	AHL	1	0	1	1	0	—	—	—	—	—
2018–19	Laval Rocket	AHL	11	1	4	5	8	—	—	—	—	—
2018–19	Hershey Bears	AHL	52	9	14	23	8	9	3	1	4	2
2019–20	Kunlun Red Star	KHL	41	3	9	12	20	—	—	—	—	—
2020–21	Kunlun Red Star	KHL	47	9	16	25	18	—	—	—	—	—
2021–22	Kunlun Red Star	KHL	48	6	18	24	24	—	—	—	—	—
2022–23	Kunlun Red Star	KHL	48	4	7	11	27	—	—	—	—	—
2023–24	Kunlun Red Star	KHL	48	2	9	11	14	—	—	—	—	—
NHL totals			44	2	10	12	12	—	—	—	—	—
KHL totals			232	24	59	83	103	—	—	—	—	—

=== International ===
Year	Team	Event	Result	GP	G	A	Pts	PIM
2022	China	OG	12th	4	0	2	2	0
2022	China	WC D2A	27th	4	1	4	5	0
2023	China	WC D1B	25th	5	0	3	3	4
Senior totals				13	1	9	10	4

== Awards and honors ==
Award	Year
OHL
Third All-Star Team	2011–12
First All-Star Team	2012–13
Defenceman of the Year	2012–13
CHL Defenceman of the Year	2012–13
AHL
All-Rookie Team	2013–14
