= Jake Chelios =

American ice hockey player (born 1991)

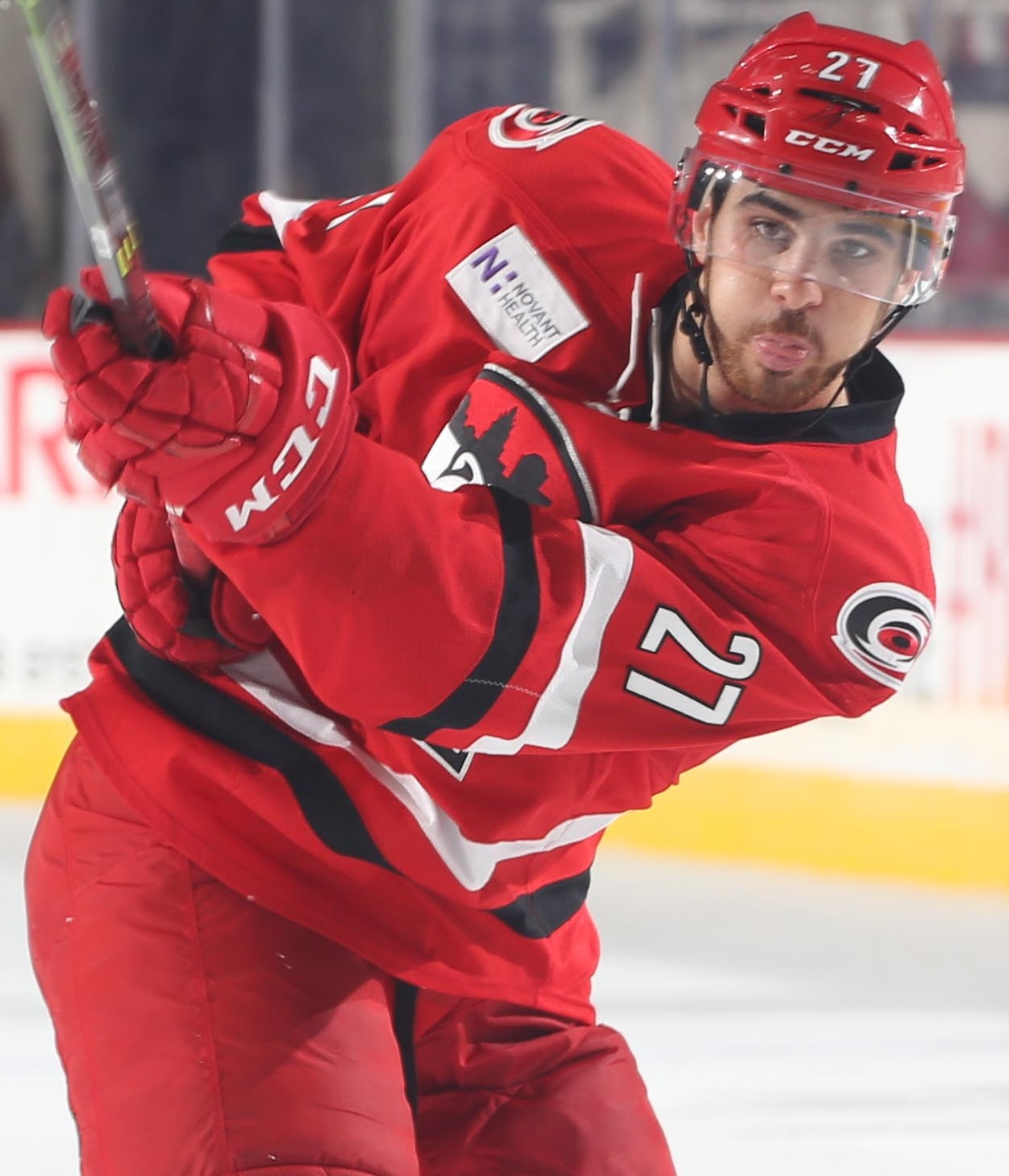
- Chelios with the Charlotte Checkers in 2015
- Born: March 8, 1991 (age 35) Chicago, Illinois, U.S.
- Height: 6 ft 2 in (188 cm)
- Weight: 185 lb (84 kg; 13 st 3 lb)
- Position: Defense
- Shot: Left
- Played for: Detroit Red Wings; Kunlun Red Star
- National team: China
- NHL draft: Undrafted
- Playing career: 2014–2025

Jake Chelios (born March 8, 1991), also known as Jieke Kailiaosi, is a Chinese-American former professional ice hockey defenseman who played in China for Kunlun Red Star in the Kontinental Hockey League (KHL) for six seasons. Born in the United States, he represented China at the 2022 Winter Olympics. He previously played with the Detroit Red Wings of the National Hockey League (NHL).

== Playing career ==
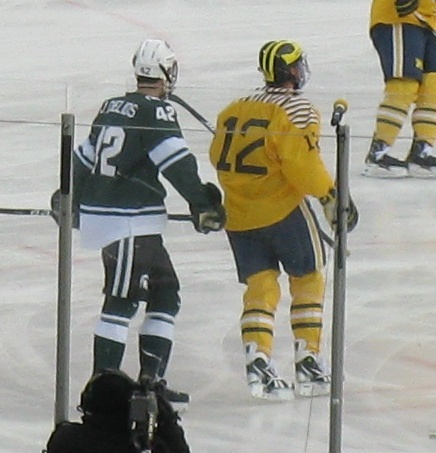
Chelios (left, playing for Michigan State) and Michigan's Carl Hagelin (right) during The Big Chill at the Big House

Chelios played with the Detroit Red Wings through to the under-18 level in the T1EHL. He later moved on to play junior hockey with the Chicago Steel in the United States Hockey League (USHL). He committed to play collegiate hockey with Michigan State University in the Big Ten Conference.

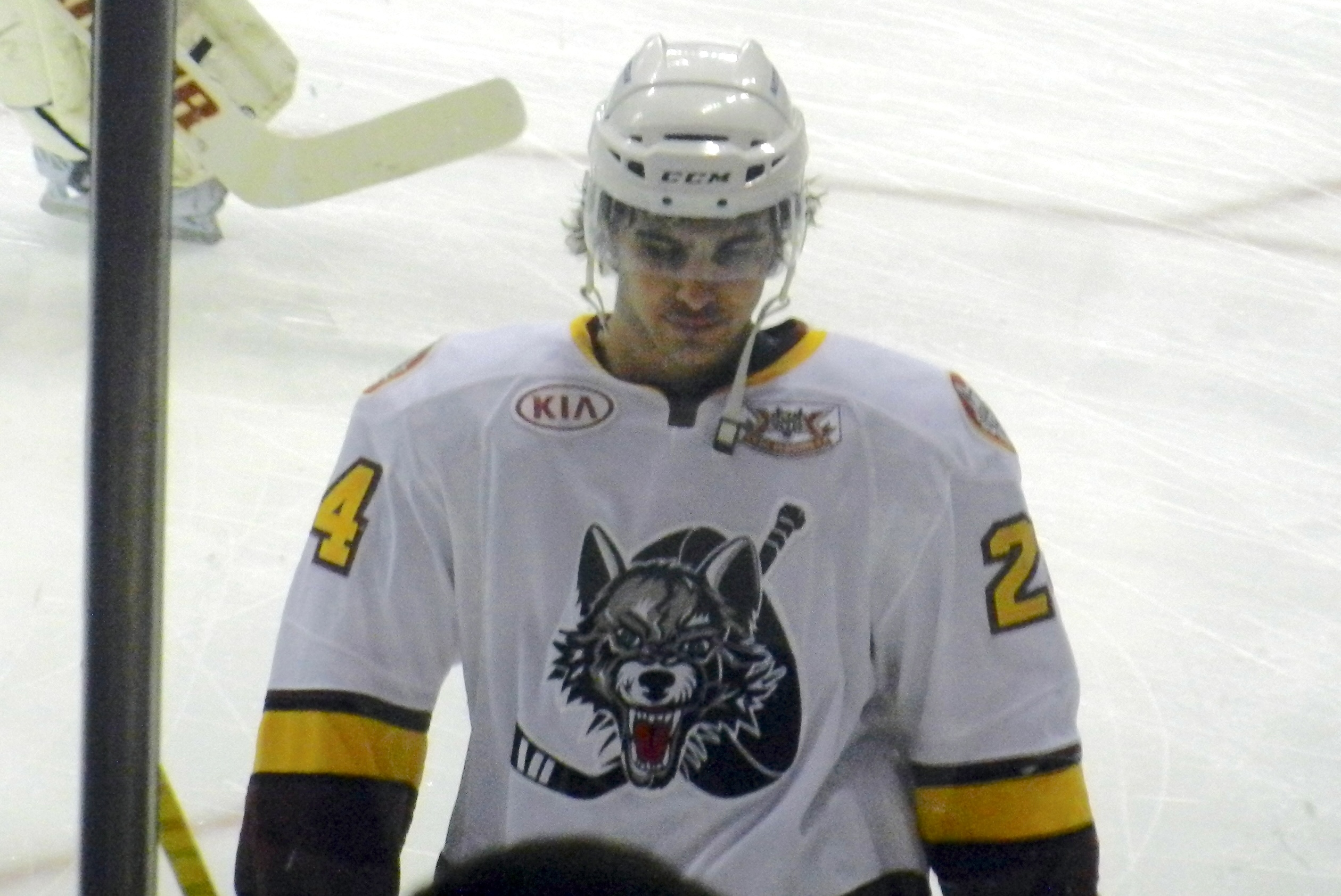
Chelios playing for the Chicago Wolves in April 2014

Undrafted, Chelios made his professional debut following his senior year in 2013–14, playing alongside brother Dean with the Toledo Walleye of the ECHL before joining the Chicago Wolves of the AHL.

After posting a breakout season in the 2015–16 campaign in scoring 31 points in 73 games with the Charlotte Checkers, Chelios was signed to his first NHL contract with parent affiliate, the Carolina Hurricanes on April 22, 2016. He re-signed with Carolina on June 27, 2017.

On July 1, 2018, the Detroit Red Wings signed Chelios to a one-year, two-way contract. On March 29, 2019, the Red Wings recalled Chelios from the Grand Rapids Griffins under emergency conditions. Before being recalled, he recorded one goal and 13 assists in 59 games for the Griffins. He made his NHL debut later that same day in a game against the New Jersey Devils. Upon making his debut, he became the sixth father-son combination in Red Wings history, joining Sid and Gerry Abel, Adam and Andy Brown, Bill and Peter Dineen, Gordie and Mark Howe, and Jimmy Peters Sr. and Jimmy Peters Jr. Chelios played out the season with the Red Wings, going scoreless in 5 games, before he was returned to Grand Rapids for the playoffs.

Chelios embarked on a career abroad as an impending free agent, agreeing to a two-year contract with Chinese-based KHL club, Kunlun Red Star, on May 23, 2019.

After six seasons and 277 games in the KHL, Chelios announced his retirement from professional hockey in August 2025. He scored 16 goals and 56 assists in his career with the Red Star, and retired as the franchise's leader in games played by a defenseman.

== International play ==
Due to his stint in China, Chelios was called up to represent the China men's national ice hockey team for the 2022 Winter Olympics, under the name Jieke Kailiaosi. He became a Chinese citizen in order to be eligible to represent the nation at the Olympics. While confirming that he kept his American citizenship, Chelios refused to answer whether he was a naturalized Chinese citizen. While the Olympic Charter stipulates that any athlete competing in the Games must be a national of the country of the NOC which is entering such competitor, the IOC Executive Board has the authority to make certain exceptions of a "general or individual nature", though it is unclear whether this was the case.

== Personal ==
Chelios is the son of NHL Hall of Famer Chris Chelios. Chelios has an older brother, Dean, and two younger sisters, Tara and Caley Chelios.

== Career statistics ==
=== Regular season and playoffs ===
			Regular season					Playoffs
Season	Team	League	GP	G	A	Pts	PIM	GP	G	A	Pts	PIM
2008–09	Little Caesars 18U AAA	T1EHL	46	14	28	42	32	—	—	—	—	—
2009–10	Chicago Steel	USHL	52	12	22	34	45	—	—	—	—	—
2010–11	Michigan State University	CCHA	37	8	6	14	34	—	—	—	—	—
2011–12	Michigan State University	CCHA	39	2	7	9	44	—	—	—	—	—
2012–13	Michigan State University	CCHA	42	5	5	10	79	—	—	—	—	—
2013–14	Michigan State University	B1G	36	2	19	21	38	—	—	—	—	—
2013–14	Toledo Walleye	ECHL	7	1	1	2	2	—	—	—	—	—
2013–14	Chicago Wolves	AHL	4	0	1	1	4	—	—	—	—	—
2014–15	Chicago Wolves	AHL	41	1	14	15	32	—	—	—	—	—
2014–15	Kalamazoo Wings	ECHL	8	1	2	3	2	4	1	1	2	2
2015–16	Charlotte Checkers	AHL	73	7	24	31	44	—	—	—	—	—
2016–17	Charlotte Checkers	AHL	76	4	28	32	54	5	0	1	1	6
2017–18	Charlotte Checkers	AHL	41	4	10	14	41	—	—	—	—	—
2018–19	Grand Rapids Griffins	AHL	61	1	14	15	28	4	0	0	0	7
2018–19	Detroit Red Wings	NHL	5	0	0	0	2	—	—	—	—	—
2019–20	Kunlun Red Star	KHL	48	2	11	13	32	—	—	—	—	—
2020–21	Kunlun Red Star	KHL	43	2	7	9	52	—	—	—	—	—
2021–22	Kunlun Red Star	KHL	38	3	6	9	40	—	—	—	—	—
2022–23	Kunlun Red Star	KHL	51	3	17	20	26	—	—	—	—	—
2023–24	Kunlun Red Star	KHL	66	4	12	16	26	—	—	—	—	—
2024–25	Kunlun Red Star	KHL	31	2	3	5	6	—	—	—	—	—
NHL totals			5	0	0	0	2	—	—	—	—	—
KHL totals			277	16	56	72	182	—	—	—	—	—

=== International ===
Year	Team	Event	Result	GP	G	A	Pts	PIM
2022	China	OG	12th	4	0	2	2	2
2022	China	WC D2A	27th	4	2	6	8	2
2023	China	WC D1B	25th	5	2	5	7	4
Senior totals				13	4	13	17	8

== Awards and honors ==
Award	Year
College
B1G Honorable Mention All-Star Team	2014
