= Vladimir Yurzinov Jr. =

Russian ice hockey player and coach

Vladimir Yurzinov Jr. (born March 26, 1965, in Moscow, Soviet Union) is the son of Vladimir Yurzinov. He was head coach of the Ilves Tampere from 1996 to 1997 in the SM-liiga. In 2016, he became the coach of Kunlun Red Star of the Kontinental Hockey League, the league's first Chinese franchise.
