= Chinese Ice Hockey Championship =

Amateur sports league

- Sport: Ice hockey
- Founded: 1953
- Country: China
- Most recent champion: Qiqihar
- Website: Chinese Ice Hockey Association

The Chinese Ice Hockey Championship is the national ice hockey championship in China. It was founded in 1953. It is made up solely of amateur teams. A number of professional Chinese teams have participated in Asia League Ice Hockey, the most recent one being China Dragon from 2008 until 2017. In 2016, Kunlun Red Star was founded and joined the Kontinental Hockey League as an expansion team.

== Champions ==
- 2018: Qiqihar
- 2017: Qiqihar 1
- 2016: Unknown
- 2015: Qiqihar 1
- 2014: Harbin
- 2013: Qiqihar 1
- 2012: Qiqihar
- 2011: Harbin
- 2010: Qiqihar
- 2009: Qiqihar
- 2008: Qiqihar
- 2007: Harbin
- 2006: Qiqihar
- 2005: Qiqihar
- 2004: Qiqihar
- 2003: Harbin
- 2002: Harbin
- 2001: Qiqihar
- 2000: Qiqihar
- 1999: Harbin
- 1998: Qiqihar
- 1997: Qiqihar
- 1996: Qiqihar
- 1995: Qiqihar
- 1994: Qiqihar
- 1993: Qiqihar
- 1992: Not contested
- 1991: Nei Menggol
- 1990: Not contested
- 1989: Harbin
- 1988: Changchun
- 1986: Harbin
- 1984: Harbin
- 1983: Jiamusi
- 1979: Qiqihar
- 1977: Harbin
- 1976: Harbin
- 1975: Harbin
- 1974: Tsitsikhar
- 1973: Harbin
- 1972: Heilungkiang
- 1963-1971: Not contested/Unknown
- 1962: Qiqihar
