= Damir Ryspayev =

Kazakh professional ice hockey defenceman

- Born: 25 April 1995 (age 31) Oskemen, Kazakhstan
- Height: 6 ft 2 in (188 cm)
- Weight: 203 lb (92 kg; 14 st 7 lb)
- Position: Defence
- Shot: Right
- Played for: Barys Astana
- Playing career: 2014–2020

Damir Muratuly Ryspayev (Kazakh: Дамир Мұратұлы Ырыспаев, romanized: Damir Mūratūly Yryspaev; born 25 April 1995) is a Kazakh former professional ice hockey defenceman.

== Brawl vs Kunlun Red Star ==
On 8 August 2016, during an exhibition game against Kunlun Red Star, Ryspayev started a brawl that caused the game to get cancelled after just three minutes. The brawl began when Ryspayev punched Tomáš Marcinko as he was checking him, and escalated when Ryspayev decided to attack the other Red Star players, seemingly at random. Eventually, after trying to attack players on the Red Star bench, Ryspayev was ejected from the game with the rest of the game getting cancelled. He was suspended by the KHL for the remainder of the exhibition season and faced a hearing for further discipline. On 18 August 2016 Ryspayev received a lifetime ban from the league, with a representative of the league's Council of Directors stating that the league could not allow its rules to be "systematically and grotesquely violated".

On 27 December 2017, the lifetime ban on Ryspayev was lifted.
