= Spencer Foo =

Canadian ice hockey player (born 1994)

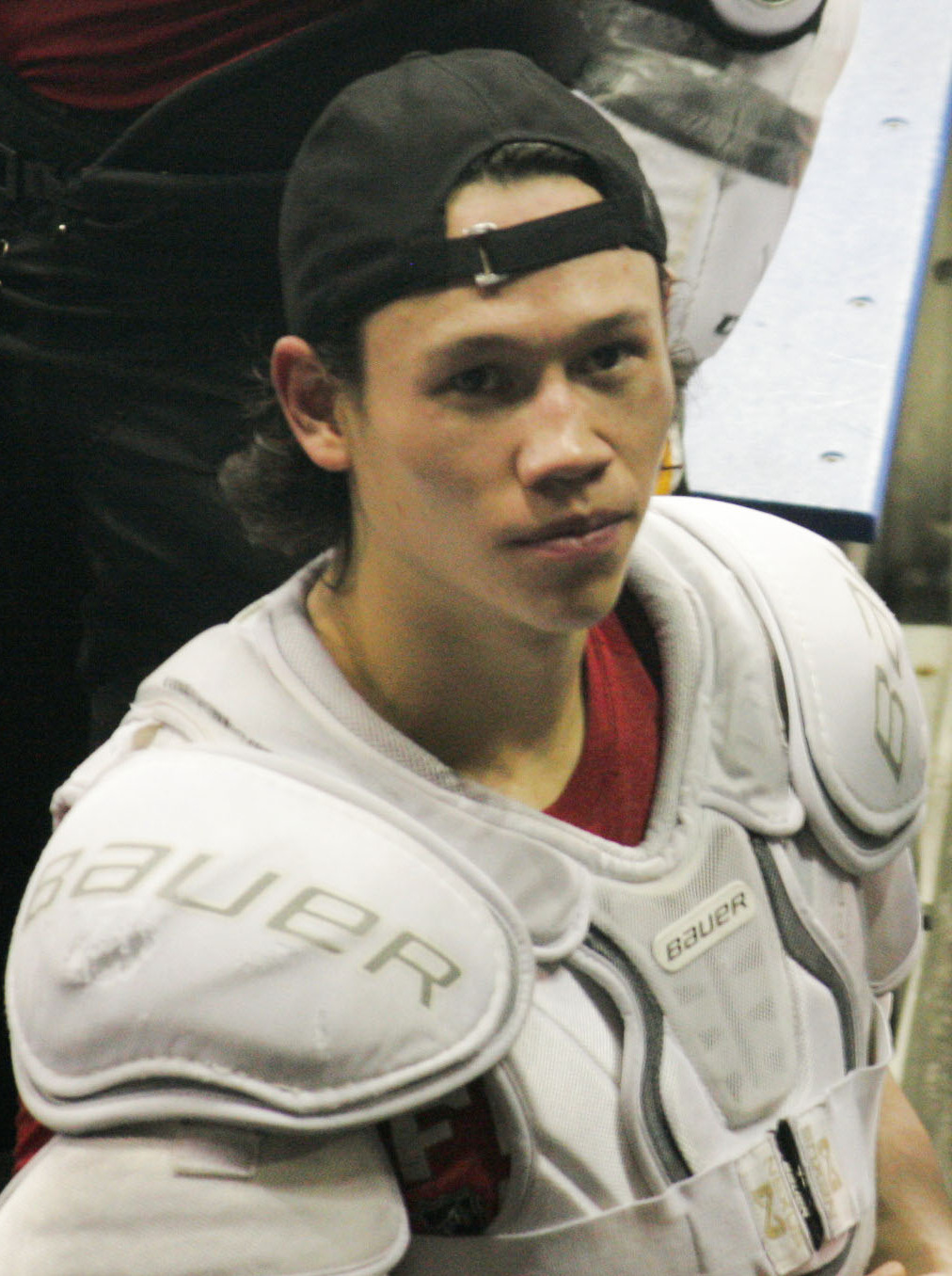
- Spencer Foo 2018 Stockton Heat.
- Born: May 19, 1994 (age 32) Edmonton, Alberta, Canada
- Height: 6 ft 0 in (183 cm)
- Weight: 190 lb (86 kg; 13 st 8 lb)
- Position: Right wing
- Shoots: Right
- KHL team Former teams: Free agent Calgary Flames; Kunlun Red Star; Shanghai Dragons
- National team: China
- NHL draft: Undrafted
- Playing career: 2017–present

Spencer Foo (born May 19, 1994), also known as Fu Jiang (Chinese: 福将), is a Chinese Canadian professional ice hockey forward who is currently an unrestricted free agent. He most recently played for the Shanghai Dragons of the Kontinental Hockey League (KHL). Foo turned professional in 2017 by signing an entry-level contract with the Calgary Flames of the National Hockey League (NHL) as an undrafted college free agent.

== Playing career ==
A native of Edmonton, Foo began his junior hockey career in the Alberta Junior Hockey League (AJHL), playing key offensive minutes and producing impressive offensive numbers in two seasons with the Bonnyville Pontiacs from 2012 to 2014. In his second season with the team, Foo scored 40 goals in 60 games, easily leading the team in scoring.

Too old to continue in the AJHL and having attracted little NHL interest, Foo moved to the Union Dutchmen of the NCAA's ECAC Hockey conference for the 2014–15 season. Foo posted pedestrian numbers in his first two seasons with the Dutchmen, scoring 25 points each year. However, the management of the Calgary Flames was impressed enough by Foo's 2015–16 campaign to invite him to their 2016 Fall Development Camp. He was not offered a contract.

Foo broke out for the Dutchmen in the 2016–17 season, scoring 62 points in 38 games, leading in assists with 36 and finishing second in goals and points behind Mike Vecchione, numbers that attracted the interest of the Philadelphia Flyers, Detroit Red Wings, Vegas Golden Knights, and his hometown Edmonton Oilers. However, Foo ultimately committed to the Calgary Flames and signed a two-year entry-level deal on 1 July.

Foo was assigned by the Flames to the American Hockey League's Stockton Heat on 26 September 2017 as part of a round of cuts during training camp. Foo started slowly with the Heat, recording just 6 goals and 13 points in his first 30 games, but he then added another 6 goals and 5 assists in his next 9 games, becoming the AHL's Player of the Week for the week ending 28 January 2018. Foo played his first NHL game with the Calgary Flames against his hometown team, the Edmonton Oilers, in Calgary on March 31, 2018. He recorded his first career NHL goal on April 5, 2018, in a 2–1 loss to the Winnipeg Jets.

On June 25, 2019, having completed his entry-level contract, Foo has tendered a qualifying offer with the Flames. The following day, it was announced that the Chinese-Canadian had signed a two-year contract with Kunlun Red Star of the KHL.

On July 14, 2022, Foo returned to North America after three seasons in the KHL, signing a one-year, two-way contract with the Vegas Golden Knights for the 2022–23 season. Assigned to AHL affiliate, the Henderson Silver Knights for the entirety of his contract with Vegas, Foo made 60 regular season appearances in adding 6 goals and 14 points.

As a free agent from the Golden Knights, Foo opted to return to his former club, Kunlun Red Star of the KHL, agreeing to a three-year deal on July 22, 2023.

== International play ==
Foo was formally called up to represent the China men's national ice hockey team for the 2022 Winter Olympics on January 28, 2022, together with his brother, Parker Foo. They were among 11 naturalized players of Chinese descent on the roster, qualifying through their father, who comes from the Chinese diaspora in Guyana.

== Career statistics ==
=== Regular season and playoffs ===
			Regular season					Playoffs
Season	Team	League	GP	G	A	Pts	PIM	GP	G	A	Pts	PIM
2010–11	CAC Canadians AAA	AMHL	34	6	21	27	30	—	—	—	—	—
2011–12	CAC Canadians AAA	AMHL	34	10	15	25	34	—	—	—	—	—
2012–13	Bonnyville Pontiacs	AJHL	55	13	17	30	59	9	1	1	2	2
2013–14	Bonnyville Pontiacs	AJHL	60	40	27	67	67	3	4	1	5	2
2014–15	Union College	ECAC	39	11	14	25	24	—	—	—	—	—
2015–16	Union College	ECAC	36	12	13	25	14	—	—	—	—	—
2016–17	Union College	ECAC	38	26	36	62	24	—	—	—	—	—
2017–18	Stockton Heat	AHL	62	20	19	39	41	—	—	—	—	—
2017–18	Calgary Flames	NHL	4	2	0	2	0	—	—	—	—	—
2018–19	Stockton Heat	AHL	67	17	21	38	36	—	—	—	—	—
2019–20	Kunlun Red Star	KHL	58	8	17	25	18	—	—	—	—	—
2020–21	Kunlun Red Star	KHL	48	9	9	18	36	—	—	—	—	—
2021–22	Kunlun Red Star	KHL	48	14	19	33	18	—	—	—	—	—
2022–23	Henderson Silver Knights	AHL	60	6	8	14	16	—	—	—	—	—
2023–24	Kunlun Red Star	KHL	54	13	16	29	25	—	—	—	—	—
2024–25	Kunlun Red Star	KHL	63	17	18	35	30	—	—	—	—	—
2025–26	Shanghai Dragons	KHL	59	11	9	20	40	—	—	—	—	—
NHL totals			4	2	0	2	0	—	—	—	—	—
KHL totals			330	72	88	160	167	—	—	—	—	—

=== International ===
Year	Team	Event	Result	GP	G	A	Pts	PIM
2022	China	OG	12th	4	0	0	0	4
2022	China	WC D2A	27th	4	3	7	10	0
2023	China	WC D1B	25th	5	4	2	6	2
Senior totals				13	7	9	16	6

== Awards and honours ==
Award	Year
College
All-ECAC Hockey Rookie Team	2014–15
