= Kunlun Red Star =

Professional ice hockey club based in Beijing, China

- City: Beijing, China
- League: KHL
- Conference: Western
- Division: Tarasov
- Founded: 2016
- Operated: 2016–2025
- Home arena: Shougang Ice Hockey Arena, Beijing; Alternate: Shenzhen Universiade Sports Centre; Arena Mytishchi (capacity: 3,000 (Beijing); 14,000 (Shenzhen); 7,000 (Mytishchi))
- Colours
- Owner: Billy Ngok
- Affiliates: KRS-BSU (VHL); ORG Junior (MHL)

Franchise history
- 2016–2025: Kunlun Red Star
- 2025–present: Shanghai Dragons

HC Kunlun Red Star (simplified Chinese: 昆仑红星; traditional Chinese: 崑崙紅星; pinyin: Kūnlún Hóngxīng) was a professional ice hockey club based in Beijing, China. It was a member of the Tarasov Division in the Kontinental Hockey League (KHL). The club joined the KHL prior to the 2016–17 season.

Kunlun Red Star was originally established as part of China's preparations for the 2022 Winter Olympics in Beijing. However, the team's connection to Chinese hockey was limited. Since the COVID-19 era, the club has played its home games in Mytishchi, Russia, and its roster is built primarily around North American imports. In their final season, there was not a single China-born player on the team.

On 6 August 2025, the team announced it was relocating to Shanghai to become the Shanghai Dragons.

== History ==
=== Preparation of the team ===
In March 2016, representatives of Kunlun Red Star and the KHL signed a protocol of intent to have a Chinese-based team enter the KHL. The protocol was signed by the representative from the Russian Ice Hockey Federation Vladislav Tretiak, the chairman of the KHL Gennady Timchenko and the board of Kunlun Red Star. In mid-April, the president of IIHF, René Fasel, shared his opinion about the intention of the Chinese club to join the KHL, expressing hope that this would help China bring their hockey to a higher level.

The club was required to meet contractual economic conditions by 30 April 2016 in order to join the KHL. According to Roman Rotenberg, HC Kunlun Red Star applied to fulfill its obligations, but there was a coherent number of formalities for the final decision about team to be taken by June 2016. In early May, the KHL president Dmitry Chernyshenko considered the affiliation of the club to the league as an already done deal: "The club has provided all the documents on the scene, the structure of the club, finance, and they have the permission of the Chinese Ice Hockey Association, the Standing Committee of the National People's Congress and the State Council of the People's Republic of China."

It was announced on 25 June 2016 that the KHL board of directors had officially accepted the club's application and that they would be participating in the upcoming 2016–17 KHL season. The Beijing announcement ceremony included Russian President Vladimir Putin and Chinese President Xi Jinping. Home games were to be played at the LeSports Center in Beijing and at the Sports Center Pavilion in Shanghai. In November 2016, it was reported the team was playing its games at the Feiyang Skating Center in Shanghai as the Beijing facility was booked full with concerts and basketball games, though plans were to return to Beijing in December. All players are required to salute during the pre-game playing of the "March of the Volunteers", the national anthem of the People's Republic of China. There were early rumours that Ilya Kovalchuk would join the team as a player, and that Mike Keenan would be the first head coach but both proved false, as Kovalchuk remained with SKA Saint Petersburg, and Vladimir Yurzinov Jr. was named the first head coach of Kunlun. Keenan would later coach Kunlun Red Star from March to December 2017.

=== 2016–17 season ===
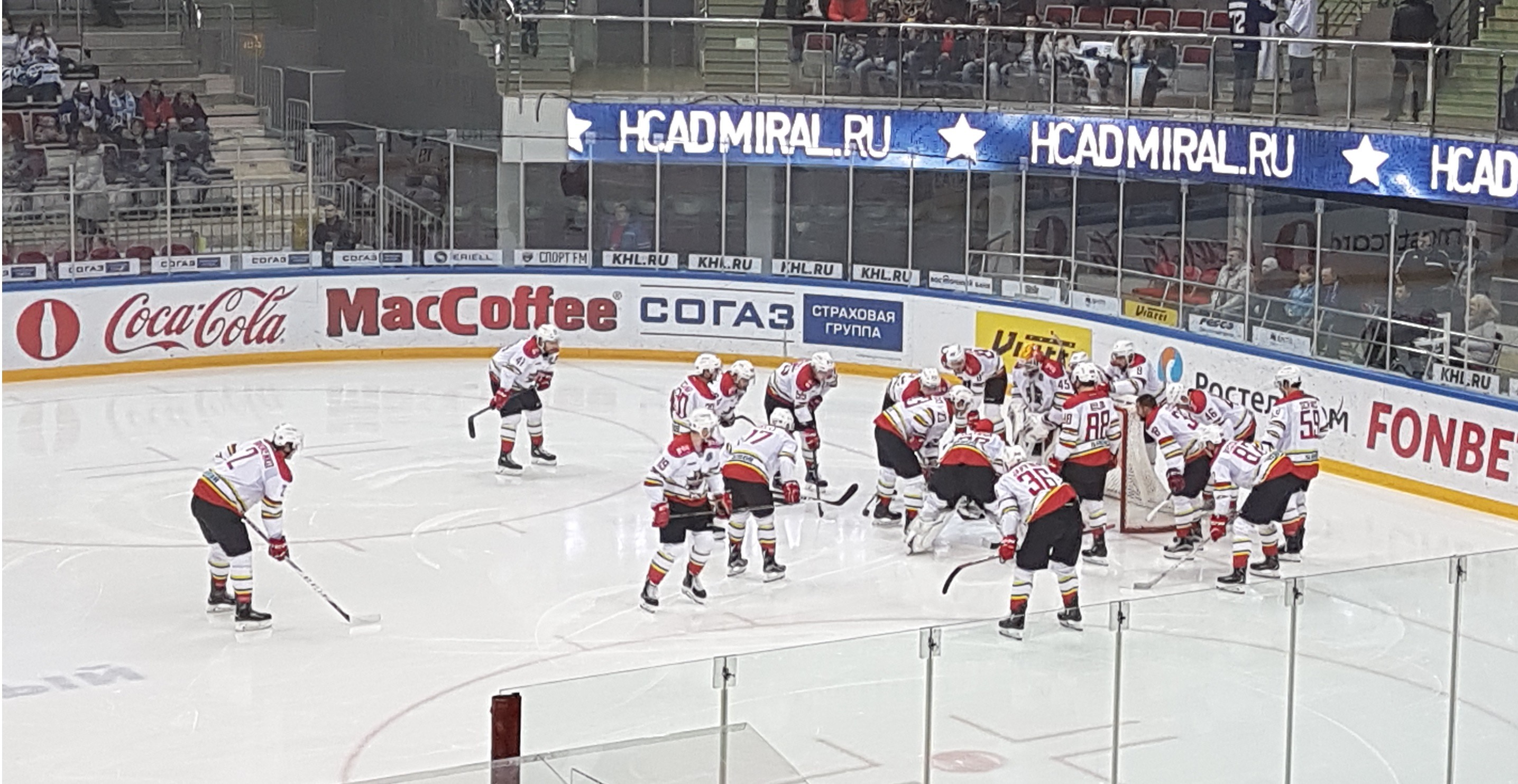
Kunlun Red Star players prior to a match in 2017

On 24 July 2016, the team played its first pre-season game, in which it was defeated 2–0 by Traktor Chelyabinsk. In a later exhibition match on 8 August 2016 against Barys Astana, a fight broke out minutes into the game when defenceman Damir Ryspayev punched Kunlun forward Tomáš Marcinko in the face, then attacked three other Kunlun players before trying to jump into the Red Star bench. The attack appeared to be retaliation for a Kunlun hit in an earlier game that had left Barys forward Dustin Boyd with a broken leg. Officials cancelled the game, and Ryspayev was suspended and eventually given a lifetime ban from the KHL.

The Kunlun Red Star won its regular season KHL debut against Amur Khabarovsk by a score of 2–1. The first goal in franchise history was scored by Sean Collins at 14:00 of the first period. The team also won its second game, a home game in front of a crowd of 7,832 people, defeating Admiral Vladivostok by a final of 6–3. On 27 October 2016, Chinese-Canadian defenceman Zach Yuen, a Vancouver-born draft pick of the Winnipeg Jets, became the first player of Chinese descent to score in a league game, in a 1–0 win over Khabarovsk. There were also four Chinese-born players on the team. KHL roster guidelines required that Red Star has any combination of at least 10 Russian and Chinese players. After the team's first home game in Beijing, the team had to play its home games during the fall in Shanghai, as the arena in Beijing was not available. However, the interest in Shanghai for games was poor; average attendance was only 1,100 for the first 14 games in Shanghai. The team returned to Beijing in mid-December. After returning to Beijing, attendance improved and the team began attracting crowds of around 7,500, comparable with the more established KHL teams. Red Star finished the season with an average attendance of 2,952, the highest of any team in Asia. Games in Shanghai averaged 1,280, while their matches in Beijing saw an average of 5,137 spectators.

Kunlun Red Star qualified for the 2017 KHL postseason and faced the defending Gagarin Cup champions Metallurg Magnitogorsk in the conference quarterfinals. Defenceman Tuukka Mäntylä scored the first two playoff goals in the Beijing club's history in a 4–2 loss to Metallurg.

=== 2017–18 season ===
On 17 March 2017 Mike Keenan was named head coach of the Chinese club. The team played very well to start to season, with a record of 6–3–1 through the first ten games but then dropped to 10-8-2 through the next ten games. Kunlun then lost 17 out of 19 games culminating with Keenan being relieved of his duties as head coach on 3 December 2017, before a game against Amur Khabarovsk. The team would rally and win that game 4–3 in overtime.

Keenan was replaced by assistant coach Bobby Carpenter, who was given the title of interim head coach. The team played better under Carpenter than they had under Keenan as they finished 19–29–8. Carpenter finished with a record of 7–13–0 while Keenan had a record 12–16–8 record at the time of his dismissal as head coach. However, this improved play could not earn the team a spot in the KHL playoffs as Red Star finished in last place in the Chernyshev Division and 23rd in the 27 team league that season. The club's attendance suffered along with the on-ice performance, as they averaged 2501 spectators per game.

=== 2018–19 season ===
On 23 February 2018 Jussi Tapola was named head coach of Kunlun Red Star. The roster for the 2018–19 season featured many newcomers but a core of key Chinese heritage players had carried over from the previous season. However, the new roster did not lead to improved on ice results as the team struggled to maintain an even win-loss record. On 17 January 2019, Sun Zehao became the first native born Chinese goalie to play in a KHL game. He came in relief of Tomi Karhunen in the 2nd period of a home game versus Yaroslavl Lokomotiv. Zehao stopped 13 of 15 shots in Kunlun Red Star's 5–1 loss. Tapola, after earning an 18–25–7 record, was relieved from his duties as head coach the next day. Curt Frasier was named the team's new head coach.

On 20 February 2019, in the second last game of the season, Ying Rudi became the first native born Chinese player to score a KHL goal. The goal came on home ice in Beijing against Red Star's divisional rival Admiral Vladivostok. Rudi's goal at 1:58 of the 3rd period would be the deciding goal in Kunlun's 6–3 victory. The change in the coaching position only worsened the club's play, as Kunlun Red Star only won two of the remaining 12 regular season games. Kunlun would finish 20th out of 25 teams in the league with a record of 20–31–11, earning the team 5th place in the Chernyshev Division. Chinese heritage player Brandon Yip set a club record by scoring 21 goals in the 2018–19 campaign and Ville Lajunen set a club record for points by a defenseman with 28. Kunlun's attendance remained stable with 2507 average spectators.

=== 2019–20 season ===
Curt Fraser remained as head coach for the 2019–20 season. Nine players with NHL experience signed with the club prior to the start of the season. Forwards Andrew Miller, Brandon DeFazio, Gilbert Brulé, Spencer Foo, and Adam Cracknell were joined by defensemen Jake Chelios, Andrej Šustr, and Trevor Murphy as well as goaltender Jeremy Smith.

Red Star began their season with a 6-game home stand in the city of Shenzhen with two games each against Salavat Yulaev Ufa, Barys Nur-Sultan, and Traktor Chelyabinsk. Kunlun defeated Ufa in their home opener 4–3 in a shootout marking the first win for the club in their home opener since their inaugural season. On September 9, 2019, Red Star forward Gilbert Brulé was ejected from a game against Barys and subsequently suspended for 2 games for a dirty hit on Nur-Sultan forward Curtis Valk. Kunlun Red Star would go 3–3 in Shenzhen, finishing with a 2–1 win over Traktor Chelyabinsk in front of a record crowd of 8,115 at Shenzhen's Universiade Sports Complex. Midway through October, Kunlun bolstered their roster with more NHL talent. Defensemen Ryan Sproul,^{[16]} Griffin Reinhart,^{[17]} and forward Devante Smith-Pelly signed with the Chinese club on one year contracts. Kunlun achieved a 3–0 shoutout victory against their divisional rival Avangard Omsk on 25 October 2019. Jeremy Smith earned his second shutout of the season and Chinese heritage player Jason Fram tallied two goals to secure the club's first win against Osmk in team history. Kunlun Red Star then won 5 straight games to close out the month of October, the first 5-game winning streak in club history. On 18 December, team captain Brandon Yip appeared in his 139th game with the team, tying the club record as Kunlun faced off against Vladivostok. Kunlun Red Star would take the game 6–3. Forward Garet Hunt would receive a 5-game suspension on December 22 for instigating a fight. Before the KHL trade deadline, Kunlun would sign former NHL first round pick Hunter Shinkaruk.

As the coronavirus began to spread in China, Kunlun needed a temporary home outside of the country. The club announced their final home games would be played in the Russia cities of Novosibirsk and Moscow. Kunlun was sitting in a position for playoff contention until this announcement and the team closed out the season losing 8 of their final 9 games. The club would miss the playoffs for the third straight year despite recording their highest point percentage since their inaugural season. The club also recorded a record attendance of 3,247 average spectators.

=== 2020–21 season ===
On 14 July 2020, Kunlun Red Star notified the league that the club would base its operations in the Russian city of Mytishchi, outside of Moscow. The team would play out of Mytishchi Arena which seats 7,000 spectators for ice hockey. Due to bureaucratic complications caused by the COVID-19 pandemic, Kunlun was unable bring their import players to Russia for the start of the season. Red Star head coach Alexei Kovalev filled his ranks entirely with Russian players signed to try out contracts, until the foreign born players could join the team.

The team struggled to start the regular season, losing their first 7 games. Kunlun Red Star were awarded their first win of the season on September 22 when their opponent, Yaroslavl Lokomotiv, failed to arrive in Mytishchi for the game due to travel complications from the ongoing pandemic. The league also indicated that there were inconsistencies between the COVID-19 tests conducted by the team and the tests conducted by the league. Unfortunately for Kunlun, that victory did not immediately jump start the team as they went on to lose the following 6 games.

Kunlun Red Star earned their first on-ice victory of the season on 15 October 2020, when they defeated Ufa Salavat Yulaev by a score of 5–3 in Mytishchi. Kunlun battled back from a 2-goal deficit to tie the game early in the third period off of the stick of Danny Kristo. Then, with less than 10 minutes on the clock in the third period, captain Luke Lockhart beat Ufa goaltender Juha Metsola to give Kunlun the lead. Cory Kane's empty net goal in the final minute sealed the win for Kunlun. With the foreign born core of the team in tow, Kunlun Red Star won their next 2 games to complete their first 3-game win streak of the season. On 25 October, Red Star forward Alexei Toropchenko set a club record for the fastest goal scored in a game, just 34 seconds into the first period, against CSKA Moscow. Three days later, Kunlun beat SKA St. Petersburg for the first time in club history, by a score of 2–1. As a result of a COVID-19 outbreak in the St. Petersburg locker room, the powerhouse club's roster was greatly depleted. After trailing by a goal in the first period, Chinese-heritage player Tyler Wong tied the game in the second period and Ryan Sproul netted the game-winning goal less than 2 minutes later. Kunlun then locked the game down defensively, as Red Star goaltender Simon Hrubec would help steal the game for Kunlun Red Star, allowing just 1 goal on 43 shots.

After their impressive win against St. Petersburg, Kunlun Red Star went 0–7–2 over their next 9 games. Red Star improved their play marginally in the middle of the season but still finished with an abysmal 2–17–1 record over their final 20 games. On 3 February 2021, Luke Lockhart became the first Dragon to play 200 games for the club. Kunlun missed the playoffs for the 4th consecutive year ultimately finishing in last place in the Chernyshev division and 22nd in the league, just one rank above last place. Attendance suffered as a result of the club's relocation to Mytishchi with an average of just 709 spectators for the season.

=== 2021–22 season ===
On 30 July 2021 Ivano Zanatta was announced as the new head coach of Kunlun Red Star. Red Star General Manager Nikolai Feoktistov confirmed that the decision was made by the Chinese sporting authorities. The main objective for the club during the 2021–22 season was to prepare the Chinese national team for the 2022 Beijing Winter Olympics and Zanatta would coach the Olympic team as well. For this reason, Kunlun's roster was composed exclusively of players who were eligible to represent Team China in the Winter Olympics. This included numerous non-KHL regular players who had played for the organization at the Junior and VHL levels.

On 4 September, forward Alex Riche scored his first career KHL goal after two seasons with Red Star where he only managed to play 4 games due to injury. His goal would complete an inspiring comeback against one of the league's top teams, Ak Bar Kazan, before Luke Lockhart broke the tie with less than ten minutes in regulation to secure the victory for Kunlun Red Star. On 2 October, forward Hu Yang became the second ever Chinese born player to score a goal in the KHL. He would beat Dynamo Moscow netminder Alexander Yeryomenko just 2:40 minutes into the game.

The club's poor performance in the 2021–22 season raised the ire of the IIHF ahead of the 2022 Winter Olympics in Beijing. But the federation ultimately decided to honor their 2018 decision to allow the host nation's team to compete. As the Olympic Games approached, Kunlun cut players from the roster who wouldn't make the roster of the national team. One of the cuts, Russian goaltender Alexander Lazushin, had played for Kunlun sporadically since the 2018–19 season and was unable to secure Chinese citizenship because of the breaks in residency. Kunlun Red Star would head into the Olympic break on a 14-game losing streak, but the KHL never resumed play after the winter games, causing the team to miss the post season for the fifth straight year. Kunlun finished dead last in the 24 team league with a franchise low in attendance with 409 average nightly spectators.

In July of 2023, the club announced the replacement of the head coach, replacing Zanatta with Greg Ireland.

== Season-by-season record ==
Note: GP = Games played, W = Wins, OTW = Overtime/shootout wins, OTL = Overtime/shootout losses, L = Losses, Pts = Points, GF = Goals for, GA = Goals against

Season	GP	W	OTW	OTL	L	Pts	GF	GA	Finish	Top scorer	Playoffs
2016–17	60	24	4	3	29	83	139	144	5th, Chernyshev	Chad Rau (40 points: 20 G, 20 A; 60 GP)	Lost in Conference Quarterfinals, 1–4 (Metallurg Magnitogorsk)
2017–18	56	15	4	8	29	61	103	146	7th, Chernyshev	Gilbert Brulé (35 points: 17 G, 18 A; 47 GP)	Did not qualify
2018–19	62	19	1	11	31	51	142	190	5th, Chernyshev	Brandon Yip (36 points: 21 G, 15 A; 62 GP)	Did not qualify
2019–20	62	20	6	8	28	60	139	158	5th, Chernyshev	Brandon Yip (31 points: 15 G, 16 A; 50 GP)	Did not qualify
2020–21	60	11	2	8	39	34	139	213	6th, Chernyshev	Ethan Werek (32 points: 15 G, 17 A; 53 GP)	Did not qualify
2021–22	48	7	2	7	32	25	101	198	6th, Kharlamov	Spencer Foo (33 points: 14 G, 19 A; 48 GP)	Did not qualify
2022–23	68	15	6	7	40	49	152	226	6th, Tarasov	Brandon Yip (42 points: 21 G, 21 A; 59 GP)	Did not qualify
2023–24	68	15	10	6	37	56	159	222	6th, Tarasov	Devin Brosseau (35 points: 23 G, 12 A; 67 GP)	Did not qualify
2024–25	68	19	9	6	34	62	171	235	6th, Tarasov	Tyler Graovac (36 points: 15 G, 21 A; 67 GP)	Did not qualify

== See also ==
- KRS Vanke Rays – Women's team operated by Kunlun Red Star in the Women's Hockey League (ZhHL). The Kunlun Red Star name is still used for the team that competes in women's international play.
- KRS-BSU – an affiliate club playing in the Supreme Hockey League (VHL).
