= KRS-BSU =

KRS-BSU Beijing
- City: Beijing, China
- League: VHL
- Founded: 2017
- Home arena: Beijin Sports University
- Colours
- General manager: Nursultan Otorbaev
- Head coach: Mark Kumpel
- Affiliates: Kunlun Red Star (KHL); ORG Junior (MHL)
- Website: RU: hcredstar.ru CN: hcredstar.com

Franchise history
- 2017–2018: KRS Heilongjiang
- 2018–2019: KRS-ORG Beijing
- 2019–: KRS-BSU Beijing

Kunlun Red Star-BSU Beijing (Chinese: 黑龙江昆仑鸿星) is a Chinese professional ice hockey club based in Beijing, China who compete in the Supreme Hockey League (VHL). KRS-BSU Beijing is the affiliate of HC Kunlun Red Star, who are in the Kontinental Hockey League (KHL).

== History ==
=== KRS Heilongjiang ===
In May 2017 in Harbin, the Ice Hockey Federation of Russia, Chinese Ice Hockey Association and government of Heilongjiang signed an agreement on the accession of a new club in the Supreme Hockey Leaque. In the Russian Ice Hockey Federation’s announcement of KRS Heilongjiang joining the VHL, it was reported that 15 Chinese players were at the event announcing the team and those players would make up the core of the KRS Heilongjiang roster. Later they were replaced by Russian and Canadian players who played for various clubs of the KHL and VHL. The team held their first match in August 2017 against Khimik Voskresensk and lost 0:6. KRS Heilongjiang played their first game in VHL season on September 10, 2017, in Jilin City against Tsen Tou and lost 4:5. The first goal in franchise history was scored by Mikhail Mokin. The first home game in Harbin was played on September 14, 2017. That game brought the team the first win in championship. Buran was beaten 4:2. The team ended the 2017/18 season in 24th place, with only 17 of the 52 games in the season being won.

=== KRS-ORG Beijing ===
Before the 2018–19 season, the club was relocated from Harbin to Beijing to facilitate player transfers between the KHL team and the second division team. A cooperation was concluded with the sports department (AZ Sports) of the packaging company ORG Packaging, whose ice rink Ao Zhong Ice Sports Center has been using the team since then. In addition, the team was KRS-ORG Beijing renamed.

=== KRS-BSU Beijing ===
For the season 2019–20, the team moved to the ice rink of the sports Peking University (Beijing Sport University) and rebranded the team name as KRS-BSU Beijing. At the same time, Kunlun Red Star founded another farm team in cooperation with ORG Packaging, which has also been participating in the VHL as ORG Beijing since 2019.

== Season-by-season record ==
Note: GP = Games played, W = Wins, OTW = Overtime/shootout wins, OTL = Overtime/shootout losses, L = Losses, Pts = Points, GF = Goals for, GA = Goals against

Season	GP	W	OTW	OTL	L	Pts	GF	GA	Finish	Playoffs
2017–18	52	15	2	9	26	58	135	176	24th	–
2018–19	56	8	5	7	36	33	129	247	29th	–
2019–20	54	14	5	4	31	42	126	173	31st	–
