= 2022–23 KHL season =

- League: Kontinental Hockey League
- Sport: Ice hockey
- Duration: 1 September 2022 – 26 February 2023 (regular season)
- Games: 68
- Teams: 22
- TV partners: Match TV; KHL-TV

Regular season
- Continental Cup winner: SKA Saint Petersburg
- Top scorer: Dmitrij Jaškin (SKA Saint Petersburg); (62 points)

Playoffs
- Finals champions: CSKA Moscow
- Runners-up: Ak Bars Kazan

KHL seasons
- ← 2021–22 2023–24 →

The 2022–23 KHL season was the 15th season of the Kontinental Hockey League. There were 22 teams that competed in the record-breaking 68 regular season games, beginning on 1 September 2022 and ending on 26 February 2023.

== Season changes ==
For the 2022–23 season, the competition was reduced to 22 teams after Latvian club, Dinamo Riga, and Finnish club, Jokerit, withdrew from the competition during the previous 2021–22 playoffs due to the Russian invasion of Ukraine.

HC Vityaz moved from the Vityaz Ice Palace in Podolsk, which was declared no longer acceptable for the KHL's requirements, to Balashikha Arena in Balashikha. Vityaz's youth academy stayed in Podolsk.

The regular season was expanded to feature 748 games scheduled for 164 gamedays, with each club to play a record-breaking 68 regular season engagements. The regular season was have just one international break, from 12–18 December 2022. That pause was preceded by the 2022 All-Star Week in Chelyabinsk on 10 and 11 of December.

== Teams ==
The 22 teams are split into four divisions: the Bobrov Division and the Tarasov Division as part of the Western Conference, with the Kharlamov Division and the Chernyshev Division as part of the Eastern Conference.

Kunlun Red Star were the only team to be realigned, moving from the Kharalamov Division in the Eastern Conference to the Tarasov Division in the Western Conference.

Western Conference		Eastern Conference	
Bobrov Division	Tarasov Division	Kharlamov Division	Chernyshev Division
(Russia) SKA Saint Petersburg	(Russia) CSKA Moscow	(Russia) Ak Bars Kazan	(Russia) Admiral Vladivostok
(Russia) HC Sochi	(Belarus) Dinamo Minsk	(Russia) Avtomobilist Yekaterinburg	(Russia) Amur Khabarovsk
(Russia) Spartak Moscow	(Russia) Dynamo Moscow	(Russia) Metallurg Magnitogorsk	(Russia) Avangard Omsk
(Russia) Torpedo Nizhny Novgorod	(China) Kunlun Red Star	(Russia) Neftekhimik Nizhnekamsk	(Kazakhstan) Barys Astana
(Russia) Vityaz Moscow Region	(Russia) Lokomotiv Yaroslavl	(Russia) Traktor Chelyabinsk	(Russia) Salavat Yulaev Ufa
	(Russia) Severstal Cherepovets		(Russia) Sibir Novosibirsk

== League standings ==
Each team played 68 games: played every other team home-and-away (42 games), plus an additional 20 intra-conference games (10 home and 10 away games). The remaining 6 games were slated against opposition selected with a view to increasing the number of high-profile match-ups (3 home, 3 on the road). Points were awarded for each game, where two points were awarded for all victories, regardless of whether it was in regulation time, in overtime or after game-winning shots. One point was awarded for losing in overtime or game-winning shots, and zero points for losing in regulation time.

=== Western Conference ===
Pos	Team	Pld	W	OTW	OTL	L	GF	GA	GD	Pts	
1	SKA Saint Petersburg (L)	68	40	10	5	13	243	150	+93	105	Conference winner and home ice advantage in conference finals of Gagarin Cup Playoffs
2	CSKA Moscow	68	33	10	8	17	214	162	+52	94	Home ice advantage in conference semi-finals of Gagarin Cup Playoffs
3	Lokomotiv Yaroslavl	68	35	6	10	17	164	122	+42	92	Home ice advantage in conference quarter-finals of Gagarin Cup Playoffs
4	Torpedo Nizhny Novgorod	68	31	11	6	20	204	172	+32	90	Home ice advantage in conference quarter-finals of Gagarin Cup Playoffs
5	Dynamo Moscow	68	29	9	11	19	174	147	+27	87	Advance to Gagarin Cup Playoffs
6	Vityaz Moscow Region	68	24	10	8	26	169	170	−1	76	Advance to Gagarin Cup Playoffs
7	Severstal Cherepovets	68	20	11	13	24	182	187	−5	75	Advance to Gagarin Cup Playoffs
8	Dinamo Minsk	68	21	6	14	27	175	201	−26	68	Advance to Gagarin Cup Playoffs
9	Spartak Moscow	68	21	7	8	32	154	192	−38	64	
10	Kunlun Red Star	68	15	6	7	40	152	226	−74	49	
11	HC Sochi	68	9	2	10	47	142	254	−112	32	

Source: KHL
Rules for classification: 1) points; 2) games won in regulation time; 3) games won in overtime; 4) games won in shootouts; 5) goal difference; 6) number of goals scored; 7) drawing of lots.
(L) Won Continental Cup

=== Eastern Conference ===
Pos	Team	Pld	W	OTW	OTL	L	GF	GA	GD	Pts	
1	Ak Bars Kazan (Z)	68	27	14	9	18	187	158	+29	91	Conference winner and home ice advantage in conference finals of Gagarin Cup Playoffs
2	Salavat Yulaev Ufa	68	28	10	10	20	174	141	+33	86	Home ice advantage in conference semi-finals of Gagarin Cup Playoffs
3	Avangard Omsk	68	27	12	8	21	188	164	+24	86	Home ice advantage in conference quarter-finals of Gagarin Cup Playoffs
4	Avtomobilist Yekaterinburg	68	30	7	9	22	188	172	+16	83	Home ice advantage in conference quarter-finals of Gagarin Cup Playoffs
5	Metallurg Magnitogorsk	68	30	5	13	20	189	175	+14	83	Advance to Gagarin Cup Playoffs
6	Sibir Novosibirsk	68	21	17	7	23	172	161	+11	83	Advance to Gagarin Cup Playoffs
7	Admiral Vladivostok	68	21	12	9	26	131	139	−8	75	Advance to Gagarin Cup Playoffs
8	Neftekhimik Nizhnekamsk	68	25	8	6	29	173	193	−20	72	Advance to Gagarin Cup Playoffs
9	Traktor Chelyabinsk	68	23	8	10	27	169	190	−21	72	
10	Amur Khabarovsk	68	21	9	9	29	141	168	−27	69	
11	Barys Astana	68	20	7	7	34	153	194	−41	61	

Source: KHL
Rules for classification: 1) points; 2) games won in regulation time; 3) games won in overtime; 4) games won in shootouts; 5) goal difference; 6) number of goals scored; 7) drawing of lots.
(Z) Won conference

=== Continental Cup ===
Pos	Team	Pld	W	OTW	OTL	L	GF	GA	GD	Pts	
1	SKA Saint Petersburg (L)	68	40	10	5	13	243	150	+93	105	Continental cup winner and first overall seed in Gagarin Cup Playoffs
2	CSKA Moscow	68	33	10	8	17	214	162	+52	94	
3	Lokomotiv Yaroslavl	68	35	6	10	17	164	122	+42	92	
4	Ak Bars Kazan	68	27	14	9	18	187	158	+29	91	
5	Torpedo Nizhny Novgorod	68	31	11	6	20	204	172	+32	90	
6	Dynamo Moscow	68	29	9	11	19	174	147	+27	87	
7	Salavat Yulaev Ufa	68	28	10	10	20	174	141	+33	86	
8	Avangard Omsk	68	27	12	8	21	188	164	+24	86	
9	Avtomobilist Yekaterinburg	68	30	7	9	22	188	172	+16	83	
10	Metallurg Magnitogorsk	68	30	5	13	20	189	175	+14	83	
11	Sibir Novosibirsk	68	21	17	7	23	172	161	+11	83	
12	Vityaz Moscow Region	68	24	10	8	26	169	170	−1	76	
13	Admiral Vladivostok	68	21	12	9	26	131	139	−8	75	
14	Severstal Cherepovets	68	20	11	13	24	182	187	−5	75	
15	Neftekhimik Nizhnekamsk	68	25	8	6	29	173	193	−20	72	
16	Traktor Chelyabinsk	68	23	8	10	27	169	190	−21	72	
17	Amur Khabarovsk	68	21	9	9	29	141	168	−27	69	
18	Dinamo Minsk	68	21	6	14	27	175	201	−26	68	
19	Spartak Moscow	68	21	7	8	32	154	192	−38	64	
20	Barys Astana	68	20	7	7	34	153	194	−41	61	
21	Kunlun Red Star	68	15	6	7	40	152	226	−74	49	
22	HC Sochi	68	9	2	10	47	142	254	−112	32	

Source: KHL
Rules for classification: 1) points; 2) games won in regulation time; 3) games won in overtime; 4) games won in shootouts; 5) goal difference; 6) number of goals scored; 7) drawing of lots.
(L) Won Continental Cup

== Gagarin Cup playoffs ==
The Gagarin Cup playoffs started on 1 March 2023. CSKA won the Gagarin Cup on April 29 in game 7 of the Gagarin Cup Finals with a score of 2-3

=== Bracket ===
Conference Quarterfinals	Conference Semifinals
E1	(Russia) Ak Bars	4
E8	(Russia) Neftekhimik	2
E1	(Russia) Ak Bars	4
E7	(Russia) Admiral	2
E2	(Russia) Salavat Yulaev	2
E7	(Russia) Admiral	4
Eastern Conference
E3	(Russia) Avangard	4
E6	(Russia) Sibir	1
E3	(Russia) Avangard	4
E5	(Russia) Metallurg	0
E4	(Russia) Avtomobilist	3
E5	(Russia) Metallurg	4
W1	(Russia) SKA	4
W8	(Belarus) Dinamo Mn	2
W1	(Russia) SKA	4
W4	(Russia) Torpedo	0
W2	(Russia) CSKA	4
W7	(Russia) Severstal	3
Western Conference
W3	(Russia) Lokomotiv	4
W6	(Russia) Vityaz	1
W2	(Russia) CSKA	4
W3	(Russia) Lokomotiv	3
W4	(Russia) Torpedo	4
W5	(Russia) Dynamo Msk	2

Conference Finals
E1	(Russia) Ak Bars	4
E3	(Russia) Avangard	1
W1	(Russia) SKA	2
W2	(Russia) CSKA	4

Gagarin Cup Finals
E1	(Russia) Ak Bars	3
W2	(Russia) CSKA	4

- Pairings within the conferences are re-seeded after the conference quarterfinals
- During the Gagarin Cup Finals the team that finished with higher seed in their conference has home ice (if both teams finished with the same seed the team that earned most points during the regular season has home ice)
- source: KHL

== Statistics ==
=== Scoring leaders ===
The following players led the league in points, at the conclusion of the regular season. If two or more skaters are tied (i.e. same number of points, goals and played games), all of the tied skaters are shown.

Player	Team	GP	G	A	Pts	+/–	PIM
(Czech Republic) Dmitrij Jaškin	SKA Saint Petersburg	67	40	22	62	+21	48
(Russia) Vladimir Tkachev	Avangard Omsk	64	23	36	59	+17	31
(Russia) Alexander Radulov	Ak Bars Kazan	62	25	32	57	+10	66
(France) Stéphane Da Costa	Avtomobilist Yekaterinburg	54	20	36	56	+14	42
(Russia) Sergey Tolchinsky	Avangard Omsk	68	16	40	56	+6	20
(United States) Reid Boucher	Avangard Omsk	64	31	24	55	+1	65
(Russia) Alexander Khokhlachev	Spartak Moscow	65	19	36	55	–9	73
(Canada) Taylor Beck	Sibir Novosibirsk	67	18	37	55	–2	50
(Russia) Alexander Nikishin	SKA Saint Petersburg	65	11	44	55	+19	50
(Russia) Marat Khairullin	SKA Saint Petersburg	65	28	26	54	+9	36
