= Jarred Tinordi =

American ice hockey player (born 1992)

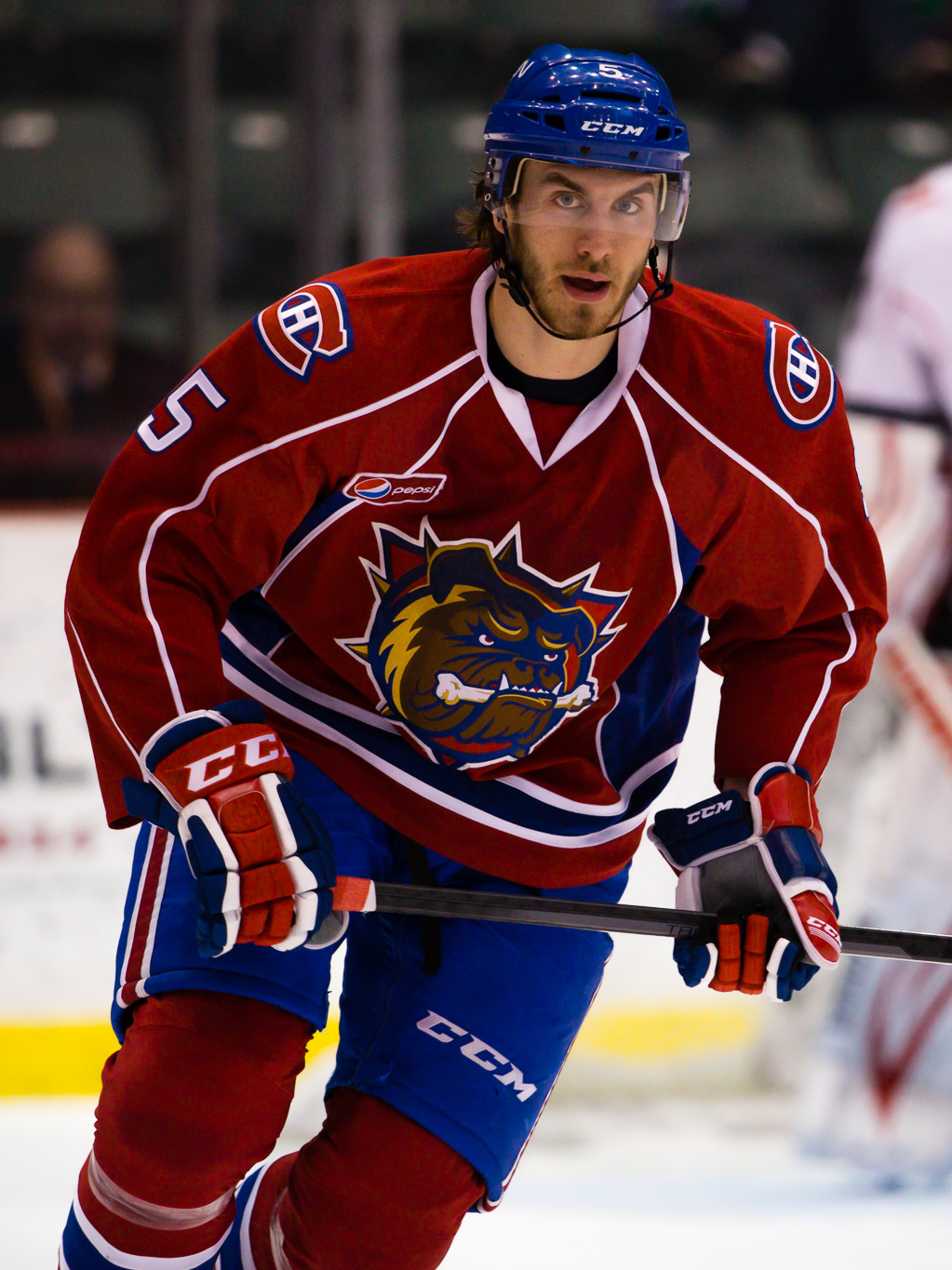
- Tinordi with the Hamilton Bulldogs in 2014
- Born: February 20, 1992 (age 34) Burnsville, Minnesota, U.S.
- Height: 6 ft 6 in (198 cm)
- Weight: 230 lb (104 kg; 16 st 6 lb)
- Position: Defense
- Shoots: Left
- AHL team Former teams: Syracuse Crunch; Montreal Canadiens; Arizona Coyotes; Nashville Predators; Boston Bruins; New York Rangers; Chicago Blackhawks
- NHL draft: 22nd overall, 2010; Montreal Canadiens
- Playing career: 2012–present

Jarred Michael Tinordi (born February 20, 1992) is an American professional ice hockey defenseman for the Syracuse Crunch of the American Hockey League (AHL). He was selected in the first round, 22nd overall, by the Montreal Canadiens in the 2010 NHL entry draft. Tinordi has also previously played for the Arizona Coyotes, Nashville Predators, Boston Bruins, New York Rangers, and Chicago Blackhawks.

== Early life ==
Tinordi was born in Burnsville, Minnesota, while his father, Mark, was a member and the captain of the Minnesota North Stars, and briefly lived in Plano, Texas, when the franchise became known as the Dallas Stars. The family eventually settled in the Washington, D.C., suburb of Millersville, Maryland, when Mark was traded to the Washington Capitals. In his youth he played in the 2004 Quebec International Pee-Wee Hockey Tournament with the Washington Little Capitals minor ice hockey team. He attended Severna Park Middle School and played for the school for the 2006-2007 season only. He later served as captain of the USA Hockey National Team Development Program, and attended Ann Arbor Pioneer High School.

== Playing career ==
Tinordi committed to University of Notre Dame Fighting Irish of the Central Collegiate Hockey Association (CCHA) for the 2010–11 season. On August 10, 2010, it was announced that Tinordi would play for the London Knights of the OHL for the 2010–11 season, forgoing his NCAA eligibility.

On March 16, 2013, as a member of the Montreal Canadiens, he played his first NHL game against the New Jersey Devils, scoring his first NHL career point on an assist in the third period. The Canadiens would go on to win the game 2-1.

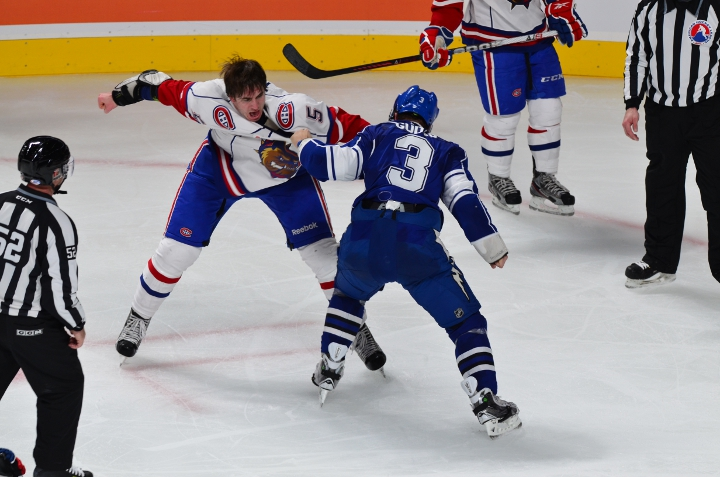
Tinordi in a fight during his time with the Hamilton Bulldogs.

In the 2015–16 season, Tinordi, no longer waiver-exempt, made the Canadiens roster out of camp as a defenseman. With the Canadiens producing the league's best start to the season, Tinordi did not play in a game in the opening months. On November 26, 2015, he was assigned to new AHL affiliate the St. John's IceCaps on a conditioning stint, appearing in 6 games. In his return to the Canadiens, Tinordi played in only three games in two months. On January 15, 2016, he was traded to the Arizona Coyotes in exchange for Victor Bartley and John Scott.

On March 9, 2016, the NHL announced that they had suspended Tinordi for 20 games without pay for violating the terms of the NHL/NHLPA Performance Enhancing Substances Program. In a statement released by the NHLPA, Tinordi stated: "I did not knowingly take a banned substance. I understand, however, that I am responsible for what enters my body as a professional athlete and I accept the suspension. I will work hard towards my return to the ice and will learn from this frustrating setback." The Arizona Coyotes subsequently announced their full support of both the Performance Enhancing Substances Program and Tinordi.

In the following 2016–17 season, upon serving his suspension, Tinordi was placed on waivers by the Arizona Coyotes and sent to the team's AHL affiliate Tucson Roadrunners. He scored the first Roadrunners goal in their home debut on October 28. He played out the season, appearing in 64 games and registering 11 points.

On July 1, 2017, Tinordi signed a one-year, two-way contract with the reigning Stanley Cup champions Pittsburgh Penguins. Tinordi was assigned by Pittsburgh to the Wilkes-Barre/Scranton Penguins for the duration of the 2017–18 season. As a key presence on the blueline, Tinordi established new professional highs with 5 goals and 21 points in 62 games.

Tinordi left the Penguins in the off-season as a free agent to sign a one-year, two-way contract with the Nashville Predators on July 1, 2018. Prior to the start of the 2018-19 season, Tinordi was named captain of the Predators' American League affiliate, the Milwaukee Admirals. He spent the season with the Admirals, recording eight goals and 22 points in 75 games.

On May 29, 2019, the Predators re-signed Tinordi to a two-year, two-way contract extension. During the 2019–20 season with the Predators, on January 29, 2020, Tinordi recorded his first career NHL goal against the Washington Capitals.

During the 2020–21 season, after appearing in seven games with the Predators, Tinordi was claimed off waivers by the Boston Bruins on February 27, 2021. He played out the remainder of his contract with the Bruins, registering one assist through 14 regular season games. On March 16, 2021, Tinordi was involved in a collision with Penguins forward Brandon Tanev. Tanev was given a 5 minute major penalty and a game misconduct for Boarding. Tinordi did not return to the game. In the postseason, he made four appearances with the Bruins.

As a free agent from the Bruins, Tinordi joined his sixth NHL organization in agreeing to a two-year, $1.8 million contract with the New York Rangers on July 28, 2021.

Entering the final year of his contract, Tinordi was placed on waivers prior to the commencement of the 2022–23 season. On October 11, 2022, he was claimed by the Chicago Blackhawks, marking his seventh NHL organization. Securing a regular third-pairing role on the blueline, on November 12, 2022, Tinordi recorded his first multi-goal game, matching his career goal totals to date, in scoring the game-winner against the Anaheim Ducks in a 3-2 victory.

Concluding a two-year tenure with the Blackhawks, Tinordi left as a free agent and was later signed to a one-year, two-way contract with the Calgary Flames for the 2024–25 season on September 10, 2024.

== International play ==
Medal record

Representing United States

Ice hockey

IIHF World U18 Championships
Gold medal – first place	2010 Minsk	

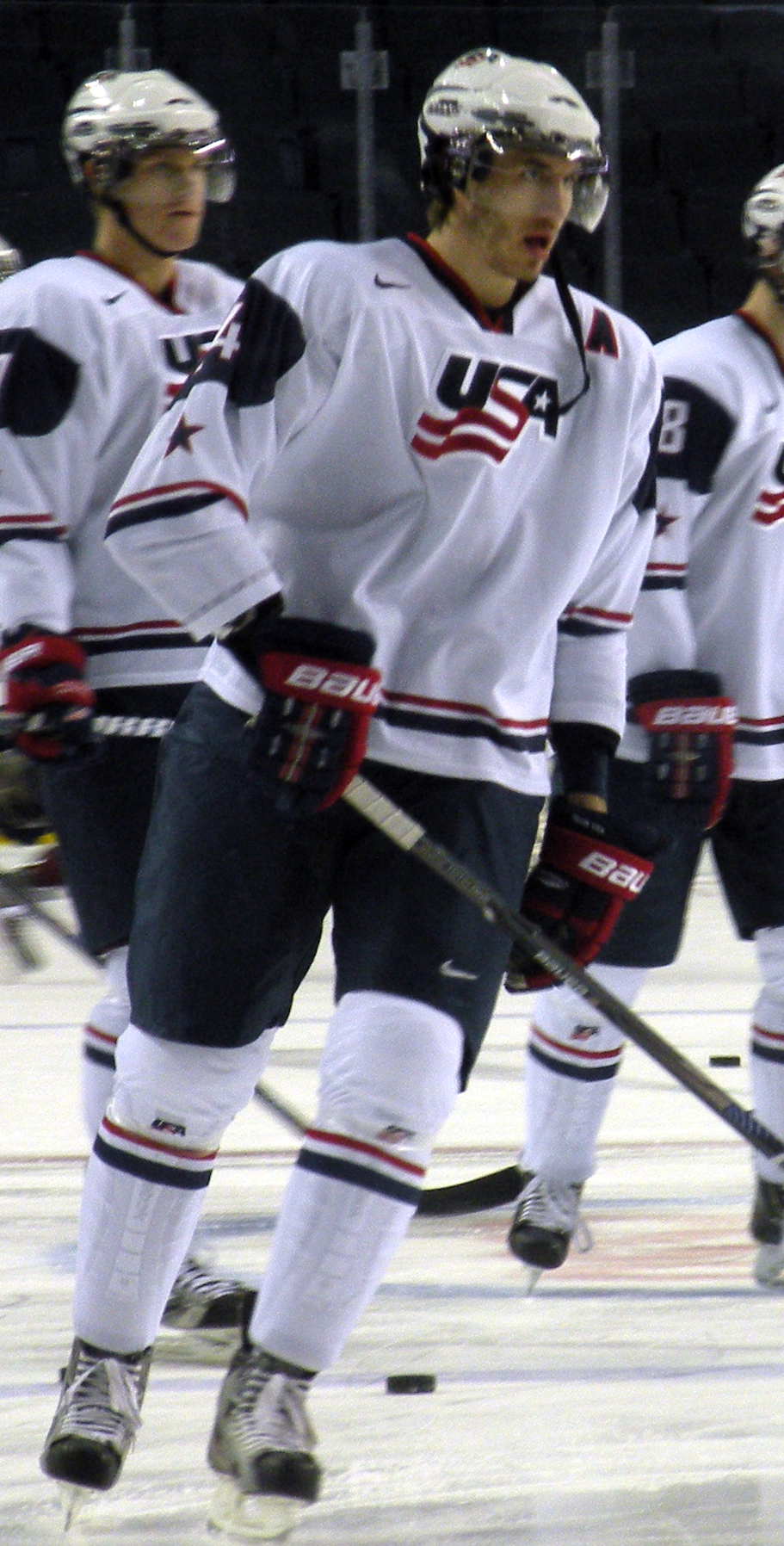
Tinordi at the 2012 World Junior Ice Hockey Championships

He was selected to take part in the 2012 World Junior Ice Hockey Championships for the United States men's national junior ice hockey team.

== Personal life ==
He is the son of former NHL player Mark Tinordi, who played a total of 12 seasons for the New York Rangers, Minnesota North Stars/Dallas Stars, and Washington Capitals.

== Career statistics ==
=== Regular season and playoffs ===
			Regular season					Playoffs
Season	Team	League	GP	G	A	Pts	PIM	GP	G	A	Pts	PIM
2007–08	Washington Jr. Nationals	AtJHL	39	4	8	12	44	5	0	2	2	2
2008–09	U.S. NTDP U17	USDP	16	3	1	4	12	—	—	—	—	—
2008–09	U.S. NTDP U18	USDP	1	0	1	1	0	—	—	—	—	—
2008–09	U.S. NTDP U18	NAHL	42	2	13	15	53	9	1	0	1	6
2009–10	U.S. NTDP U18	USHL	26	4	5	9	68	—	—	—	—	—
2009–10	U.S. NTDP U18	USDP	39	2	6	8	37	—	—	—	—	—
2010–11	London Knights	OHL	63	1	13	14	140	6	0	0	0	17
2011–12	London Knights	OHL	48	2	14	16	63	19	3	5	8	27
2012–13	Hamilton Bulldogs	AHL	67	2	11	13	71	—	—	—	—	—
2012–13	Montreal Canadiens	NHL	8	0	2	2	2	5	0	1	1	15
2013–14	Montreal Canadiens	NHL	22	0	2	2	40	—	—	—	—	—
2013–14	Hamilton Bulldogs	AHL	47	3	6	9	70	—	—	—	—	—
2014–15	Montreal Canadiens	NHL	13	0	2	2	19	—	—	—	—	—
2014–15	Hamilton Bulldogs	AHL	44	1	6	7	36	—	—	—	—	—
2015–16	St. John's IceCaps	AHL	6	0	2	2	6	—	—	—	—	—
2015–16	Montreal Canadiens	NHL	3	0	0	0	5	—	—	—	—	—
2015–16	Arizona Coyotes	NHL	7	0	0	0	12	—	—	—	—	—
2016–17	Tucson Roadrunners	AHL	64	1	10	11	102	—	—	—	—	—
2017–18	Wilkes-Barre/Scranton Penguins	AHL	62	5	16	21	86	2	0	0	0	0
2018–19	Milwaukee Admirals	AHL	75	8	14	22	85	5	0	1	1	10
2019–20	Milwaukee Admirals	AHL	32	0	6	6	55	—	—	—	—	—
2019–20	Nashville Predators	NHL	28	1	4	5	34	4	0	0	0	2
2020–21	Nashville Predators	NHL	7	0	0	0	4	—	—	—	—	—
2020–21	Boston Bruins	NHL	14	0	1	1	7	4	0	0	0	5
2021–22	New York Rangers	NHL	7	1	0	1	7	—	—	—	—	—
2021–22	Hartford Wolf Pack	AHL	32	1	4	5	56	—	—	—	—	—
2022–23	Chicago Blackhawks	NHL	44	2	6	8	40	—	—	—	—	—
2023–24	Chicago Blackhawks	NHL	52	0	9	9	64	—	—	—	—	—
2024–25	Calgary Wranglers	AHL	30	1	4	5	29	—	—	—	—	—
2025–26	Syracuse Crunch	AHL	44	2	6	8	84	4	0	1	1	2
NHL totals			205	4	26	30	234	13	0	1	1	22

=== International ===
Year	Team	Event	Result	GP	G	A	Pts	PIM
2009	United States	U17	3rd place, bronze medalist(s)	6	0	0	0	0
2010	United States	U18	1st place, gold medalist(s)	7	1	1	2	10
2012	United States	WJC	7th	6	1	1	2	6
Junior totals				19	2	2	4	16

== Awards and honors ==
Award	Year	Ref
OHL
J. Ross Robertson Cup	2012	
CHL
Memorial Cup All-Star Team	2012	

Awards and achievements
Preceded by Louis Leblanc	Montreal Canadiens first-round draft pick 2010	Succeeded by Nathan Beaulieu
