= Morgan Ellis =

Canadian ice hockey player (born 1992)

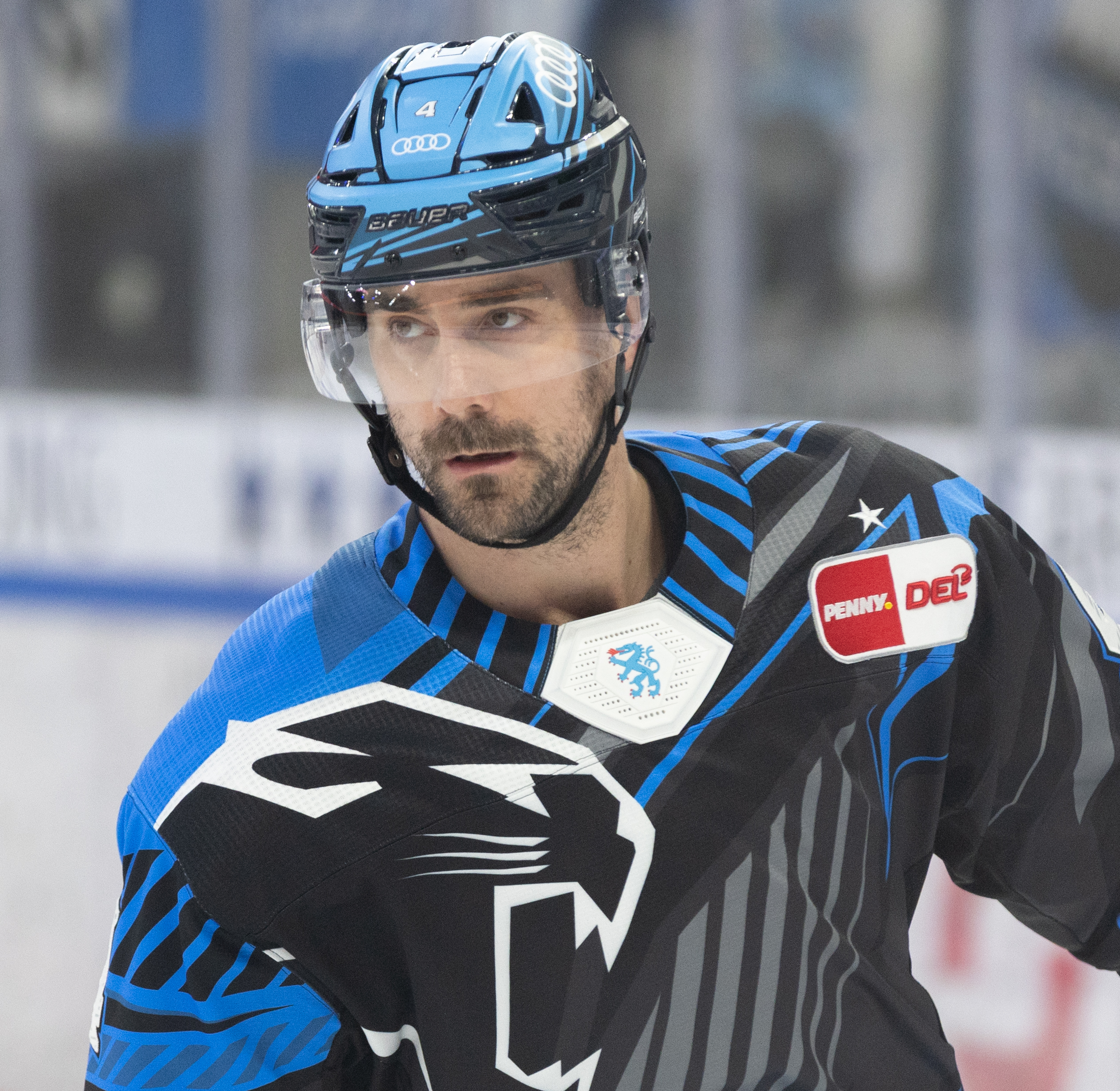
- Ellis with ERC Ingolstadt (2025)
- Born: April 30, 1992 (age 34) Summerside, Prince Edward Island, Canada
- Height: 6 ft 1 in (185 cm)
- Weight: 208 lb (94 kg; 14 st 12 lb)
- Position: Defence
- Shoots: Right
- DEL team Former teams: ERC Ingolstadt; Montreal Canadiens; Skellefteå AIK; Färjestad BK; Kölner Haie; HC Sochi; Dinamo Riga; Eisbären Berlin
- National team: Canada
- NHL draft: 117th overall, 2010; Montreal Canadiens
- Playing career: 2012–present

Morgan Ellis (born April 30, 1992) is a Canadian professional ice hockey defenceman and captain for ERC Ingolstadt of the Deutsche Eishockey Liga (DEL). He was selected in the fourth round, 117th overall, by the Montreal Canadiens in the 2010 NHL entry draft.

== Playing career ==
=== Junior ===
Ellis played four seasons in the Quebec Major Junior Hockey League (QMJHL) beginning in 2008, and was recognized for his outstanding performance during his final season of major junior hockey when he was selected as recipient of the Kevin Lowe Trophy as the league's best defensive defenceman, as well as being named to the 2011–12 QMJHL Second All-Star Team. Spending the entirety of his career with the Cape Breton Screaming Eagles to date, Ellis was traded to the Shawinigan Cataractes in December 2011, and would help the team capture the 2012 Memorial Cup that following April.

=== Professional ===
Originally selected by the Montreal Canadiens in 2010 (117th overall), Ellis was signed to a three-year, entry-level contract by the Canadiens on March 1, 2012. In 2012–13, his first professional season, he was assigned to play in the American Hockey League (AHL) with the Hamilton Bulldogs, skating in 71 games and registering four goals and four assists for eight points, along with 57 penalty minutes.

On June 1, 2015, Ellis was signed to a one-year, two-way contract extension by the Canadiens. On January 27, 2016, he was named to represent the North Division roster for the AHL All-Star Game while member of the Canadiens newfound AHL affiliate, the St. John's IceCaps.

On February 26, 2016, Ellis was recalled by the Canadiens and played in his first National Hockey League (NHL) game on March 2, 2016, in a 3–2 shootout loss to the Anaheim Ducks at the Honda Center. He would play two additional NHL games before being reassigned to the IceCaps on March 6, 2016.

On July 2, 2016, having left the Canadiens organization as a free agent, Ellis agreed to a one-year, two-way deal with the St. Louis Blues. After competing in the Blues' 2016 training camp, he was assigned to AHL affiliate, the Chicago Wolves, for the duration of the 2016–17 season.

As an impending unrestricted free agent, Ellis opted to sign his first contract abroad in agreeing to a one-year deal with Swedish club, Skellefteå AIK of the Swedish Hockey League (SHL), on May 15, 2017. He would ultimately split the 2017–18 season between SAIK and Färjestad BK, posting 10 points in 49 combined games.

Once again a free agent at season's end, Ellis moved to the Deutsche Eishockey Liga (DEL), agreeing to a one-year contract with German outfit Kölner Haie on May 9, 2018.

Ellis continued his journeyman European career in 2019–20, signing a one-year contract with Russian club HC Sochi of the Kontinental Hockey League (KHL) on May 2, 2019. At the conclusion of his contract in Sochi, he remained in the KHL by securing a one-year deal with Latvian-based club Dinamo Riga on August 3, 2020.

In the 2020–21 season, Ellis began the year as an alternate captain with Riga, posting a goal and three points through 17 games. However, on November 30, 2020, he would leave the KHL and return to Germany, signing for the remainder of the DEL season with ERC Ingolstadt.

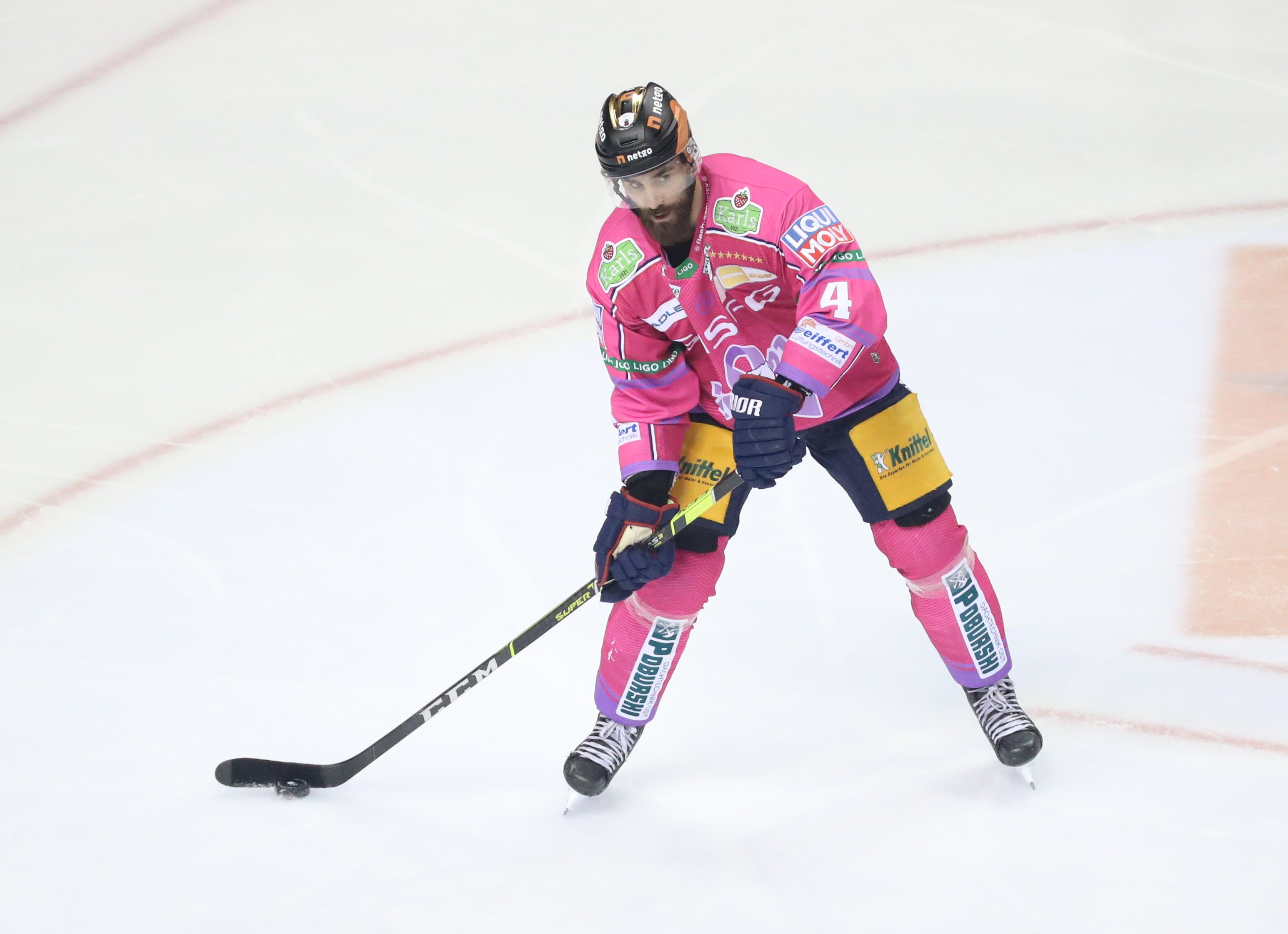
Ellis with Eisbären Berlin in 2021

Beginning in the 2021–22 season, Ellis played with the Eisbären Berlin, agreeing to a two-year contract with the team in May 2021, followed by a one-year extension prior to the 2023–24 season.

Following three seasons with Eisbären Berlin in which he won two league championships, Ellis returned to ERC Ingolstadt in July 2024, inking a one-year contract for the 2024–25 season. Thereafter, he agreed to a one-year extension with the team in March 2025 and again in April 2026.

== International play ==
Internationally, Ellis first represented Hockey Canada as part of team Canada Atlantic at both the 2008 and 2009 iterations of the World U-17 Hockey Challenge.

In December 2021, Ellis was named to Team Canada as part of the annual Channel One Cup. The following year, he was again named to Team Canada for the 2022 Winter Olympics held in Beijing.

== Career statistics ==
=== Regular season and playoffs ===
			Regular season					Playoffs
Season	Team	League	GP	G	A	Pts	PIM	GP	G	A	Pts	PIM
2008–09	Cape Breton Screaming Eagles	QMJHL	52	0	6	6	45	10	0	1	1	4
2009–10	Cape Breton Screaming Eagles	QMJHL	60	4	25	29	56	5	1	0	1	10
2010–11	Cape Breton Screaming Eagles	QMJHL	65	8	28	36	65	4	0	0	0	8
2011–12	Cape Breton Screaming Eagles	QMJHL	34	7	18	25	18	—	—	—	—	—
2011–12	Shawinigan Cataractes	QMJHL	26	8	19	27	38	11	4	7	11	6
2012–13	Hamilton Bulldogs	AHL	71	4	4	8	57	—	—	—	—	—
2013–14	Hamilton Bulldogs	AHL	59	3	7	10	36	—	—	—	—	—
2014–15	Hamilton Bulldogs	AHL	27	3	6	9	13	—	—	—	—	—
2014–15	Wheeling Nailers	ECHL	39	13	13	26	22	5	0	2	2	0
2015–16	St. John's IceCaps	AHL	73	16	26	42	51	—	—	—	—	—
2015–16	Montreal Canadiens	NHL	3	0	0	0	2	—	—	—	—	—
2016–17	Chicago Wolves	AHL	74	9	21	30	36	10	0	1	1	0
2017–18	Skellefteå AIK	SHL	39	0	5	5	40	—	—	—	—	—
2017–18	Färjestad BK	SHL	9	4	1	5	4	6	0	1	1	27
2018–19	Kölner Haie	DEL	52	12	22	34	26	11	0	4	4	4
2019–20	HC Sochi	KHL	54	1	16	17	28	—	—	—	—	—
2020–21	Dinamo Rīga	KHL	17	1	2	3	4	—	—	—	—	—
2020–21	ERC Ingolstadt	DEL	38	4	19	23	36	5	1	1	2	8
2021–22	Eisbären Berlin	DEL	50	2	9	11	31	12	0	2	2	12
2022–23	Eisbären Berlin	DEL	55	1	19	20	64	—	—	—	—	—
2023–24	Eisbären Berlin	DEL	51	5	16	21	41	14	0	1	1	14
2024–25	ERC Ingolstadt	DEL	48	3	12	15	35	11	1	5	6	10
2025–26	ERC Ingolstadt	DEL	50	5	14	19	41	5	1	1	2	33
NHL totals			3	0	0	0	2	—	—	—	—	—
DEL totals			344	32	111	143	274	58	3	14	17	81
KHL totals			71	2	18	20	32	—	—	—	—	—

=== International ===
Year	Team	Event	Result	GP	G	A	Pts	PIM
2008	Canada Atlantic	U17	8th	5	0	0	0	4
2009	Canada Atlantic	U17	9th	5	1	1	2	0
2021	Canada	COC	3rd	3	0	1	1	0
2022	Canada	OG	6th	2	0	0	0	5
Junior totals				10	1	1	2	4
Senior totals				5	0	1	1	5

== Awards and honours ==
Award	Year	Ref
QMJHL
Kevin Lowe Trophy – Best Defensive Defenceman	2012	
Second All-Star Team	2012	
CHL
CHL Canada/Russia Series participant	2011	
Memorial Cup champion	2012	
AHL
All-Star Game	2016	
DEL
Champion (Eisbären Berlin)	2022, 2024	
