= Centre Gervais Auto =

Multi-purpose arena in Shawinigan, Quebec

Coordinates: 46.54175°N 72.7455°W

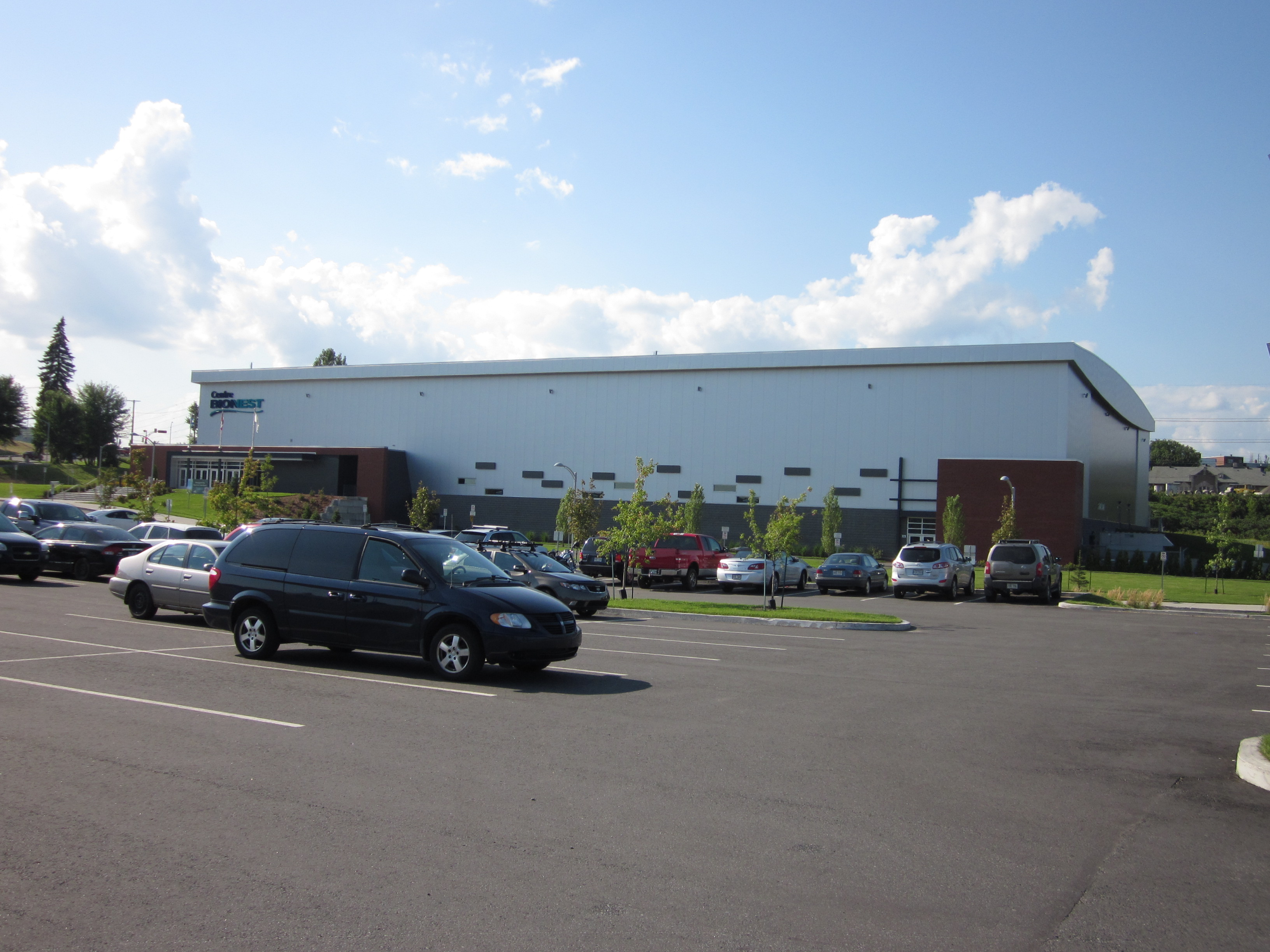

- Location within Quebec Location within Canada
- Former names: Centre Bionest (2009-13); Amphithéâtre Shawinigan (2008-09)
- Location: 1200, avenue des Cèdres; Shawinigan, Quebec, Canada
- Owner: Shawinigan, Quebec
- Capacity: Hockey: 4,195
- Surface: 200' X 100' or 85' (rectractable)

Construction
- Opened: December 27, 2008

Tenants
- Shawinigan Cataractes (QMJHL) (2008–present)

Centre Gervais Auto is a 4,125-seat multi-purpose arena in Shawinigan, Quebec, Canada that opened on December 27, 2008, and has been the home of the Shawinigan Cataractes since 2008. When the Shawinigan Cataractes played their first-ever game in their new state-of-the-art facility, the game sold out with 4,112 spectators in attendance. The Cataractes won 5–1 against the Junior de Montreal. The team departed from the historic Aréna Jacques Plante after their last game there on December 18 of the same year.

== Events ==
On May 5, 2009, the Shawinigan Cataractes hosted their first QMJHL President Cup Finals game in 38 years and their first in the new arena. The area hosted the 2012 Memorial Cup from May 18 to May 27, 2012. On May 27, 2012, the Shawinigan Cataractes defeated the London Knights 2–1 in overtime to capture the MasterCard Memorial Cup, and also become just the second team in QMJHL history as the host team to win.

== Tenants ==
- Shawinigan Cataractes (QMJHL)
  (2008–present)

== Retired jerseys ==
The following numbers have been retired by the Cataractes (positions in parentheses) and hang from the rafters:

- 7 Michel Brière (F) Shawinigan Bruins (original team name)
- 14 Benoit Plouffe (F) Shawinigan Dynamos (team name change)
- 18 Marcel Giguère (F) Shawinigan Cataractes (present team name)
- 26 Dean Bergeron (F)
- 17 Patrice Lefebvre (F)
- 27 Stephan Lebeau (F)
- 33 Patrick Lalime (G)
- 21 Marc-André Bergeron (D)
- 19 Stephane Robidas (D)
