= Austin Watson =

American ice hockey player (born 1992)

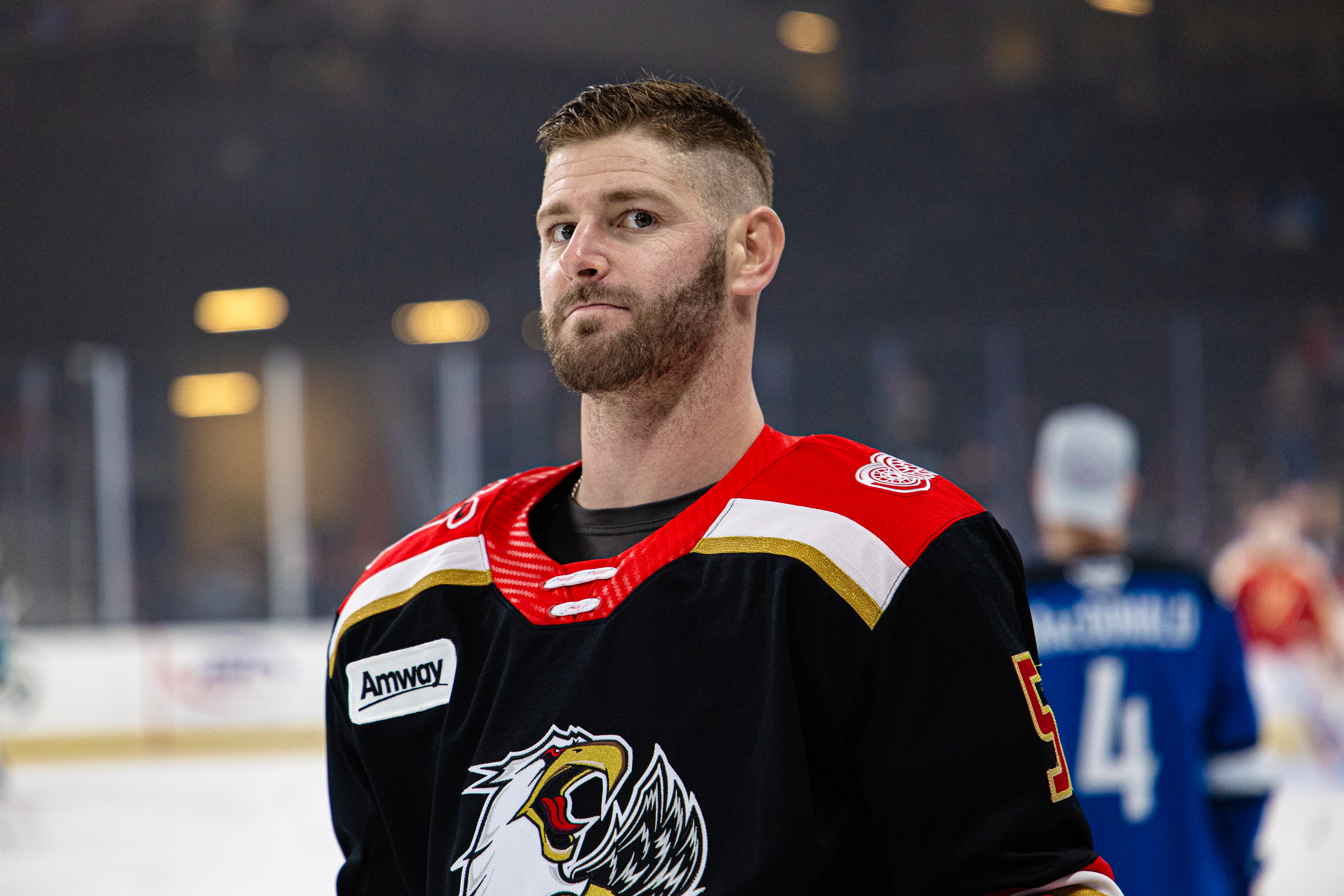
- Watson with the Grand Rapids Griffins in 2025
- Born: January 13, 1992 (age 34) Ann Arbor, Michigan, U.S.
- Height: 6 ft 4 in (193 cm)
- Weight: 204 lb (93 kg; 14 st 8 lb)
- Position: Left wing
- Shoots: Right
- NHL team Former teams: Free agent Nashville Predators; Ottawa Senators; Tampa Bay Lightning; Detroit Red Wings
- National team: United States
- NHL draft: 18th overall, 2010; Nashville Predators
- Playing career: 2011–present

Austin Watson (born January 13, 1992) is an American professional ice hockey left winger who is currently an unrestricted free agent. He most recently played for the Grand Rapids Griffins in the American Hockey League (AHL) while under contract to the Detroit Red Wings of the National Hockey League (NHL). He was selected 18th overall by the Nashville Predators in the 2010 NHL entry draft. He has also played for the Ottawa Senators and Tampa Bay Lightning.

== Early life ==
Austin Watson was born January 13, 1992, in Ann Arbor, Michigan, where he was raised by his father and mother, Mike and Mary Watson. He is the oldest of ten children, nine boys and one girl. He went to school one year at Detroit Catholic Central High School, and one year at Father Gabriel Richard High School before he was drafted into the Ontario Hockey League (OHL), where he attended St. Anne's High School, and after being traded to Peterborough, finishing high school there. Watson played for the high school golf team at Father Gabriel Richard, where they went to the state finals.

== Playing career ==
=== Amateur ===
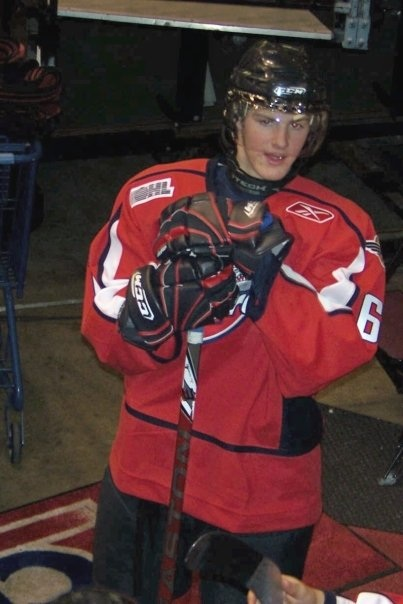
Watson with the Windsor Spitfires of the Ontario Hockey League in 2009

As a youth, Watson played in the 2005 Quebec International Pee-Wee Hockey Tournament with the Detroit Compuware Ambassadors minor ice hockey team.

Watson verbally committed to the University of Maine Black Bears college hockey program. Watson was selected by the Windsor Spitfires of the OHL draft in the second round, 36th overall. Watson chose to play with Windsor, foregoing his verbal commitment to Maine. Watson surprised people with his fast skating and smart play in his rookie season. Despite the fact that Watson hit a slump mid-season, he came out with 10 goals and 19 assists, for a total of 29 points. During the playoffs, after a total of 20 games played, he snatched up 3 more points in the form of assists. He accompanied the Spitfires to becoming the most elite in the league, winning the OHL's J. Ross Robertson Cup, and were named the Canadian Hockey League's Memorial Cup champions. The team was at the same time breaking the record by becoming the first team to ever come back for an overall win from fourth place in the finals. Also, it was the first Spitfires franchise win of the Memorial Cup.

On January 11, 2010, the Spitfires traded Watson to the Peterborough Petes. The trade was to his benefit, as he received a chance at more playing time on this younger team. Watson played in the 2010 CHL Top Prospects game for Team Cherry, and played well, as he, among other things, broke up a 5-on-3 penalty kill, though he broke his ankle blocking a second shot and missed a month with the Petes.

While playing with the Spitfires, Watson was projected to go 25th according to the International Scouting Service (ISS) in the 2010 NHL entry draft, but after an advantageous trade to the Petes, he jumped in rank to 14th in April, where the NHL Central Scouting Final Ranks placed him. According to the ISS, he ranked 12th. Watson was drafted in the first round, 18th overall by the Nashville Predators.

On January 9, 2012, the Petes traded Watson to the London Knights for Chase Hatcher and a series of draft picks. He won a second J. Ross Robertson Cup with the Knights that season, receiving the Wayne Gretzky 99 Award as playoff MVP. He became the first American to win OHL Playoff MVP honors. The Knights also took part in the Memorial Cup tournament that year, losing to the Shawinigan Cataractes in the championship game.

=== Professional ===
Watson began playing professionally during the 2012–13 season, where he scored 37 points in 72 games for the Predators' American Hockey League (AHL) affiliate, the Milwaukee Admirals. He also appeared in six games for the Predators, where he scored his first career NHL goal against Mikka Kiprusoff of the Calgary Flames on April 23, 2013. Watson became a regular in the Predators lineup during the 2015–16 NHL season, suiting up in 57 games, but was a healthy scratch many games. In the following season, on October 6, 2016, he was placed on waivers but went unclaimed. Watson skated in 77 games for the Predators that season, scoring 17 points. He also recorded 4 goals and 9 points in 22 playoff games, as the team reached the Stanley Cup Final for the first time in franchise history. The Predators ultimately fell in six games to the Pittsburgh Penguins. He was used predominantly as a bottom-six forward by the Predators.

On July 24, 2017, the Predators re-signed Watson to a three-year, $3.3 million contract worth $1.1 million annually. In the 2017–18 season, Watson received his first NHL two-game suspension for boarding Colorado Avalanche forward Dominic Toninato on November 18, 2017. Watson missed the first 18 games of the 2018–19 season due to a suspension for non-hockey related reasons and on January 29, 2019, Watson was suspended indefinitely after an alcohol related relapse. After completing the NHL's substance abuse program, Watson was reinstated and assigned to Milwaukee on March 25, 2019. He was recalled by Nashville on April 2, after scoring four goals in two games with Milwaukee. On October 31, the Predators signed Watson to a three-year contract extension. In the 2019–20 season, Watson played in 53 games with the Predators scoring six goals and 14 points before the NHL suspended the season due to the COVID-19 pandemic on March 12. He was also held scoreless in two playoff games.

Watson was traded by Nashville to the Ottawa Senators in exchange for a fourth-round selection in the 2021 NHL entry draft on October 10, 2020. He made his Ottawa debut on January 15, 2021, in the season opener, scoring his first goal with the team against Frederik Andersen in a 5–3 victory over the Toronto Maple Leafs. He was used as a fourth-line winger and on the penalty kill special teams by Ottawa. On March 22, he was struck in the hand blocking a shot in a win over the Calgary Flames and missed the remainder of the season. In the pandemic-shortened 2020–21 season, Watson played in 34 games, scoring three goals and 10 points. Watson was hurt in the final exhibition game and did not make his 2021–22 season until November 2, 2021, in a 5–4 overtime loss to the Minnesota Wild. On February 13, 2022, Watson was suspended two games for interference on Boston Bruins defenseman Jack Ahcan. He finished the season with ten goals and 16 points in 67 games. In his final season in Ottawa in 2022–23, Watson scored nine goals and 11 points in 75 games, with three shorthanded goals among them.

Having left the Senators as an unrestricted free agent following three seasons with the organization, Watson was later signed to a professional tryout contract with the Tampa Bay Lightning in preparation for the 2023–24 season on August 24, 2023. He made the Lightning team out of training camp and signed a one-year contract with the team on October 9. He made his Lightning debut against the Ottawa Senators in a 5–2 loss on October 15. He scored his first goal with the Lightning against Jeremy Swayman in a 5–4 victory over the Boston Bruins on November 20. On December 8, Watson was fined $2,022.57 by the NHL for unsportsmanlike conduct at the end of the match versus the Nashville Predators on December 7. He appeared in 33 games with the Lightning, recording just two goals and four points.

After a lone season with the Lightning, Watson left as an unrestricted free agent and was un-signed over the summer. On August 29, 2024, Watson accepted an invitation to attend the Detroit Red Wings training camp for the 2024–25 season on a professional tryout. Following the preseason, Watson signed a one-year contract with the Red Wings on October 7, 2024. After going unclaimed on waivers, Watson was assigned to Detroit's AHL affiliate on October 8, the Grand Rapids Griffins, for the 2024–25 season. However, his stay in Grand Rapids was brief, appearing in two games before being recalled on October 14. Watson made his Red Wings debut that night in a 4–1 loss to the New York Rangers. He was returned to Grand Rapids the following day. He was recalled again October 30 by Detroit on an emergency basis after Vladimir Tarasenko fell ill and played that night against the Winnipeg Jets. He was returned to Grand Rapids. On March 5, 2025, he signed a one-year, two-way contract extension with Detroit. He was recalled one final time on April 8 for a road trip at the end of the season. He finished the season with 19 goals and 42 points in 60 games with Grand Rapids and 13 games with Detroit, recording three goals. Watson attended Detroit's 2025 training camp but was waived and assigned to Grand Rapids to start the 2025–26 season. In 62 games with Grand Rapids, he recorded 12 goals and 24 points. Despite the Griffins advancing to the third round of the 2026 Calder Cup playoffs, Watson only appeared in one playoff game, going scoreless.

== International play ==
Medal record

Ice hockey

Representing United States

IIHF World U18 Championship
Gold medal – first place	2010 WJC U18	

Watson was selected to play for the US national under-18 select team for the 2009 Ivan Hlinka Memorial Tournament. Despite the fact that the US did not win, he played well, tying the US record for most points in a single game.

Watson was selected to play for the US national team at the 2010 World U18 Hockey Championships. Though the US team ultimately won the gold medal, Watson was ejected from the championship game 5 minutes in for a boarding call.

== Domestic assault charge ==
On June 16, 2018, Watson was arrested in Franklin, Tennessee, on a misdemeanour charge of domestic assault. According to the police report, an officer was flagged down after a witness reported seeing Watson "swat" his girlfriend, Jenn Guardino, and prevent her from leaving the couple's SUV at a gas station. According to the police report, when the officer arrived at the scene, he witnessed Guardino "trying to back away from being shoved, saying 'stop' and covering her face." At the time of the incident, Watson claimed he and Guardino were arguing about her drinking and not being able to attend a wedding. Watson admitted to pushing Guardino and the officer noted red marks on her chest. Guardino denied that Watson had touched her, but later changed her statement and told police that he was responsible for the marks on her chest. Guardino told police that Watson at times "gets handsy" and pleaded with officers not to press charges, fearing damage to his NHL career. Watson was subsequently charged with suspicion of domestic assault. The police report noted that Guardino became "extremely upset" when Watson was taken into custody.

On July 24, 2018, Watson pleaded no contest to the domestic assault charge. He was sentenced to one-year probation and ordered to complete a 26-week batterer intervention course. Violating his probation could earn Watson up to a year in jail time. As a result of his charge, Watson was suspended by the NHL from all 2018–19 preseason games and 27 regular season games. After appealing his suspension to an independent arbitrator, Watson's suspension was reduced to 18 games.

On October 13, 2018, Guardino issued a statement in which she clarifies the events on the June 16 incident, claiming that it was not an act of domestic violence and that Watson would never hit or abuse her. She attributed the incident entirely to her own drinking problem. In the public statement, Guardino apologized to everyone involved, including the Predators and the city of Nashville, and thanked Watson for his support. The statement read in part:

My behaviour and state of intoxication led to the police being involved that day. I have struggled with alcoholism for many years and I am actively involved in AA. I am fortunate to have Austin's continued support with my treatment. We handled matters poorly on June 16th and know that we need to make better decisions going forward.

— Jenn Guardino, October 13, 2018

In mid 2023, Watson and Guardino (now Jenn Watson; born c. 1988) married in Nashville. The couple have two daughters together.

== Career statistics ==
=== Regular season and playoffs ===
			Regular season					Playoffs
Season	Team	League	GP	G	A	Pts	PIM	GP	G	A	Pts	PIM
2008–09	Windsor Spitfires	OHL	63	10	19	29	41	20	0	3	3	15
2009–10	Windsor Spitfires	OHL	42	11	23	34	14	—	—	—	—	—
2009–10	Peterborough Petes	OHL	10	9	11	20	8	4	2	0	2	2
2010–11	Peterborough Petes	OHL	68	34	34	68	54	—	—	—	—	—
2010–11	Milwaukee Admirals	AHL	5	0	0	0	0	3	0	0	0	0
2011–12	Peterborough Petes	OHL	32	14	19	33	33	—	—	—	—	—
2011–12	London Knights	OHL	29	11	24	35	14	19	10	7	17	10
2012–13	Milwaukee Admirals	AHL	72	20	17	37	22	4	1	0	1	0
2012–13	Nashville Predators	NHL	6	1	0	1	0	—	—	—	—	—
2013–14	Milwaukee Admirals	AHL	76	22	24	46	24	3	0	0	0	6
2014–15	Milwaukee Admirals	AHL	76	26	18	44	34	—	—	—	—	—
2015–16	Nashville Predators	NHL	57	3	7	10	32	—	—	—	—	—
2016–17	Milwaukee Admirals	AHL	3	1	0	1	9	—	—	—	—	—
2016–17	Nashville Predators	NHL	77	5	12	17	99	22	4	5	9	28
2017–18	Nashville Predators	NHL	76	14	5	19	123	13	5	3	8	12
2018–19	Nashville Predators	NHL	37	7	9	16	39	6	1	1	2	6
2018–19	Milwaukee Admirals	AHL	2	4	0	4	0	—	—	—	—	—
2019–20	Nashville Predators	NHL	53	6	8	14	65	4	0	0	0	2
2020–21	Ottawa Senators	NHL	34	3	7	10	40	—	—	—	—	—
2021–22	Ottawa Senators	NHL	67	10	6	16	91	—	—	—	—	—
2022–23	Ottawa Senators	NHL	75	9	2	11	123	—	—	—	—	—
2023–24	Tampa Bay Lightning	NHL	33	2	2	4	93	—	—	—	—	—
2024–25	Grand Rapids Griffins	AHL	60	19	23	42	112	3	0	0	0	4
2024–25	Detroit Red Wings	NHL	13	3	0	3	17	—	—	—	—	—
2025–26	Grand Rapids Griffins	AHL	62	12	12	24	146	1	0	0	0	0
NHL totals			528	63	58	121	722	45	10	9	19	48

=== International ===
Year	Team	Event	Result	GP	G	A	Pts	PIM
2010	United States	U18	1st place, gold medalist(s)	7	2	1	3	33
2012	United States	WJC	7th	6	3	6	9	0
2022	United States	WC	4th	10	0	1	1	27
Junior totals				13	5	7	12	33
Senior totals				10	0	1	1	27

== Awards and honors ==
Award	Year
OHL
West Academic Player of the Month (December)	2008
J. Ross Robertson Cup (Windsor Spitfires)	2009
Memorial Cup (Windsor Spitfires)	2009
CHL/NHL Top Prospects Game	2010
J. Ross Robertson Cup (London Knights)	2012
Wayne Gretzky 99 Award	2012
CHL Memorial Cup All-Star Team	2012

Awards and achievements
Preceded by Ryan Ellis	Nashville Predators first-round draft pick 2010	Succeeded by Seth Jones
