= 2012 Memorial Cup =

Canadian junior men's ice hockey championship

2012 Mastercard Memorial Cup

Tournament details
- Venue(s): Centre Bionest; Shawinigan, Quebec
- Dates: May 18–27, 2012
- Teams: 4
- Host team: Shawinigan Cataractes (QMJHL)
- TV partner(s): Sportsnet, TVA Sports

Final positions
- Champions: Shawinigan Cataractes (QMJHL) (1st title)
- Runners-up: London Knights (OHL)

Tournament statistics
- Games played: 9
- Attendance: 40,373 (4,486 per game)
- Scoring leader: Michael Chaput (Cataractes) (12 points)

Awards
- MVP: Michael Chaput (Cataractes)

The Memorial Cup trophy

The 2012 MasterCard Memorial Cup was a four-team, round-robin format ice hockey tournament played from May 18–27, 2012 at the Centre Bionest in Shawinigan, Quebec. It was the 94th Memorial Cup championship and determined the champion of the Canadian Hockey League (CHL). The tournament featured the London Knights, champions of the Ontario Hockey League (OHL); the Saint John Sea Dogs, champions of the Quebec Major Junior Hockey League (QMJHL); the Edmonton Oil Kings, champions of the Western Hockey League (WHL); and the Shawinigan Cataractes, who won the right to host the tournament over bids by the Saint John Sea Dogs, Halifax Mooseheads and Cape Breton Screaming Eagles.

On May 27, the Shawinigan Cataractes defeated the London Knights 2–1 in overtime to win the Memorial Cup for the first time ever in franchise history, becoming just the second team after the 2009 Windsor Spitfires to win the Memorial Cup after playing in the tiebreaker game; the first host to win the Memorial Cup at home since the Vancouver Giants in 2007; and the first QMJHL host to win the Memorial Cup since the Hull Olympiques in 1997. The Cataractes win also gave the QMJHL back-to-back Memorial Cups for the first time since the Granby Prédateurs in 1996 and the Hull Olympiques in 1997.

== Round-robin standings ==
| Pos | Team | Pld | W | L | GF | GA | |
|---|---|---|---|---|---|---|---|
| 1 | London Knights (OHL) | 3 | 2 | 1 | 11 | 10 | Advanced directly to the championship game |
| 2 | Saint John Sea Dogs (QMJHL) | 3 | 2 | 1 | 12 | 8 | Advanced to the semifinal game |
| 3 | Shawinigan Cataractes (Host/QMJHL) | 3 | 1 | 2 | 10 | 10 | Advanced to the semifinal game |
| 4 | Edmonton Oil Kings (WHL) | 3 | 1 | 2 | 7 | 12 | |

For the first time since the current tournament format was established in 1983, the teams each split their first two games. At the conclusion of the round-robin, the tiebreaker between the first and second team as well as between the third and fourth placed team were decided by head-to-head records.

Note: Shawinigan finished fourth based on head-to-head round-robin matchups but defeated Edmonton in the tiebreaker game.

== Schedule ==
All times local (UTC −4)

=== Round robin ===
| May 18 | Edmonton Oil Kings | 4–3 | Shawinigan Cataractes | Centre Bionest, Shawinigan | Recap |
| Laurent Brossoit 30 saves / 33 shots | | Goalie stats | Alex Dubeau 20 saves / 24 shots |

| May 19 | Saint John Sea Dogs | 3–5 | London Knights | Centre Bionest, Shawinigan | Recap |
| Mathieu Corbeil 19 saves / 24 shots | | Goalie stats | Michael Houser 22 saves / 25 shots |

| May 20 | Shawinigan Cataractes | 6–2 | London Knights | Centre Bionest, Shawinigan | Recap |
| Gabriel Girard 24 saves / 26 shots | | Goalie stats | Michael Houser 27 saves / 32 shots |

| May 21 | Saint John Sea Dogs | 5–2 | Edmonton Oil Kings | Centre Bionest, Shawinigan | Recap |
| Mathieu Corbeil 25 saves / 27 shots | | Goalie stats | Laurent Brossoit 29 saves / 33 shots |

| May 22 | London Knights | 4–1 | Edmonton Oil Kings | Centre Bionest, Shawinigan | Recap |
| Michael Houser 20 saves / 21 shots | | Goalie stats | Laurent Brossoit 24 saves / 27 shots |

| May 23 | Shawinigan Cataractes | 1–4 | Saint John Sea Dogs | Centre Bionest, Shawinigan | Recap |
| Gabriel Girard 34 saves / 37 shots | | Goalie stats | Mathieu Corbeil 30 saves / 31 shots |

=== Playoff round ===
Tiebreaker

| May 24 | Shawinigan Cataractes | 6–1 | Edmonton Oil Kings | Centre Bionest, Shawinigan | Recap |
| Gabriel Girard 29 saves / 30 shots | | Goalie stats | Laurent Brossoit 25 saves / 31 shots |

Semi-final

| May 25 | Shawinigan Cataractes | 7–4 | Saint John Sea Dogs | Centre Bionest, Shawinigan | Recap |
| Gabriel Girard 24 saves / 28 shots | | Goalie stats | Mathieu Corbeil 30 saves / 36 shots |

Final

| May 27 | Shawinigan Cataractes | 2–1 | OT | London Knights | Centre Bionest, Shawinigan | Recap |
| Gabriel Girard 35 saves / 36 shots | | Goalie stats | | Michael Houser 35 saves / 37 shots |

== Statistical leaders ==
=== Skaters ===
| Player | Team | GP | G | A | Pts | PIM |
|---|---|---|---|---|---|---|
| Michael Chaput | Shawinigan Cataractes | 6 | 5 | 7 | 12 | 4 |
| Anton Zlobin | Shawinigan Cataractes | 6 | 5 | 4 | 9 | 0 |
| Brandon Gormley | Shawinigan Cataractes | 6 | 3 | 6 | 9 | 6 |
| Jonathan Huberdeau | Saint John Sea Dogs | 4 | 5 | 2 | 7 | 10 |
| Michael Bournival | Shawinigan Cataractes | 6 | 3 | 4 | 7 | 8 |
| Henrik Samuelsson | Edmonton Oil Kings | 4 | 2 | 3 | 5 | 8 |
| Austin Watson | London Knights | 4 | 2 | 3 | 5 | 0 |
| Morgan Ellis | Shawinigan Cataractes | 6 | 1 | 4 | 5 | 6 |
| Kirill Kabanov | Shawinigan Cataractes | 6 | 1 | 4 | 5 | 0 |
| Zack Phillips | Saint John Sea Dogs | 4 | 3 | 1 | 4 | 4 |

GP = Games played; G = Goals; A = Assists; Pts = Points; PIM = Penalty minutes

=== Goaltending ===
This is a combined table of the top goaltenders based on goals against average and save percentage with at least sixty minutes played. The table is sorted by GAA.

| Player | Team | GP | W | L | SA | GA | GAA | SV% | SO | TOI |
|---|---|---|---|---|---|---|---|---|---|---|
| Gabriel Girard | Shawinigan Cataractes | 5 | 4 | 1 | 157 | 11 | 2.08 | .930 | 0 | 317:36 |
| Michael Houser | London Knights | 4 | 2 | 2 | 115 | 11 | 2.58 | .904 | 0 | 256:07 |
| Mathieu Corbeil | Saint John Sea Dogs | 4 | 2 | 2 | 118 | 14 | 3.51 | .881 | 0 | 239:07 |
| Laurent Brossoit | Edmonton Oil Kings | 4 | 1 | 3 | 124 | 16 | 4.04 | .871 | 0 | 237:29 |

GP = Games played; W = Wins; L = Losses; SA = Shots against; GA = Goals against; GAA = Goals against average; SV% = Save percentage; SO = Shutouts; TOI = Time on ice (minutes:seconds)

== Awards ==
- Stafford Smythe Memorial Trophy (MVP) – Michael Chaput (Shawinigan Cataractes)
- Ed Chynoweth Trophy (Leading Scorer) – Michael Chaput (Shawinigan Cataractes)
- George Parsons Trophy (Sportsmanlike) – Zack Phillips (Saint John Sea Dogs)
- Hap Emms Memorial Trophy (Top Goalie) – Gabriel Girard (Shawinigan Cataractes)
- All-Star Team:

Goaltender: Michael Houser (London Knights)
Defence: Jarred Tinordi (London Knights), Brandon Gormley (Shawinigan Cataractes)
Forwards: Henrik Samuelsson (Edmonton Oil Kings), Austin Watson (London Knights), Michael Chaput (Shawinigan Cataractes)

== Rosters ==
=== Shawinigan Cataractes (Host) ===
- Head coach: Eric Veilleux

| Pos. | No. | Player |
|---|---|---|
| GK | 31 | Alex Dubeau |
| GK | 38 | Gabriel Girard |
| D | 2 | Dillon Donnelly |
| D | 3 | Jonathan Racine |
| D | 4 | Morgan Ellis |
| D | 12 | Patrick Volpe |
| D | 15 | Jonathan Narbonne |
| D | 28 | Justin Hache |
| D | 36 | Brandon Gormley |
| D | 55 | Mathieu Gagnon |
| F | 8 | Mitchell Maynard |
| F | 9 | Yannick Veilleux |
| F | 11 | Frederick Gaudreau |
| F | 22 | Alexandre Grandmaison |
| F | 44 | Felix-Antoine Bergeron |
| F | 54 | Maximilien Le Sieur |
| F | 60 | Pierre-Olivier Morin |
| F | 62 | Michael Chaput |
| F | 72 | Loik Poudrier |
| F | 77 | Kirill Kabanov |
| F | 78 | Michael Bournival |
| F | 79 | Anton Zlobin |
| F | 91 | Vincent Arseneau |
| F | 92 | Peter Sakaris |

=== Saint John Sea Dogs (QMJHL) ===
- Head coach: Gerard Gallant

| Pos. | No. | Player |
|---|---|---|
| GK | 33 | Sebastien Auger |
| GK | 35 | Mathieu Corbeil |
| D | 4 | Ian Saab |
| D | 6 | Jason Seed |
| D | 8 | Spencer MacDonald |
| D | 21 | Kevin Gagné |
| D | 23 | Pierre Durepos |
| D | 28 | Nathan Beaulieu |
| D | 55 | Charles-Olivier Roussel |
| F | 3 | Charlie Coyle |
| F | 7 | Zack Phillips |
| F | 9 | Stephen MacAulay |
| F | 11 | Jonathan Huberdeau |
| F | 12 | Devon Oliver-Dares |
| F | 13 | Tomas Jurco |
| F | 14 | Jason Cameron |
| F | 18 | Danick Gauthier |
| F | 19 | Ryan Tesink |
| F | 22 | Aidan Kelly |
| F | 25 | Maxime Villemaire |
| F | 26 | Grant West |
| F | 27 | Oliver Cooper |
| F | 97 | Stanislav Galiev |

=== London Knights (OHL) ===
- Head coach:Mark Hunter

| Pos. | No. | Player |
|---|---|---|
| GK | 29 | Michael Houser |
| GK | 35 | Jake Patterson |
| GK | 41 | Tyson Teichmann |
| D | 2 | Olli Maatta |
| D | 3 | Brett Cook |
| D | 6 | Scott Harrington |
| D | 14 | Tommy Hughes |
| D | 20 | Kevin Raine |
| D | 24 | Jarred Tinordi |
| D | 26 | Colin Martin |
| D | 39 | Kyle Flemington |
| F | 16 | Max Domi |
| F | 17 | Seth Griffith |
| F | 18 | Vladislav Namestnikov |
| D/F | 21 | Tyler Ferry |
| F | 27 | Brett Welychka |
| F | 46 | Matt Rupert |
| F | 51 | Austin Watson |
| F | 53 | Bo Horvat |
| F | 64 | Ryan Rupert |
| F | 71 | Chris Tierney |
| F | 77 | Josh Anderson |
| F | 86 | Andreas Athanasiou |
| F | 92 | Gregory McKegg |
| F | 97 | Jared Knight |

=== Edmonton Oil Kings (WHL) ===
- Head coach: Derek Laxdal

| Pos. | No. | Player |
|---|---|---|
| GK | 30 | Tristan Jarry |
| GK | 31 | Laurent Brossoit |
| D | 2 | Cody Corbett |
| D | 3 | Mark Pysyk |
| D | 4 | Keegan Lowe |
| D | 5 | Ashton Sautner |
| D | 8 | Griffin Reinhart |
| D | 22 | Ryan Dech |
| D | 24 | Mason Geertsen |
| D | 28 | Martin Gernat |
| F | 7 | Stephane Legault |
| F | 9 | Klarc Wilson |
| F | 10 | Henrik Samuelsson |
| F | 11 | Dylan Wruck |
| F | 12 | Cole Benson |
| F | 16 | T. J. Foster |
| F | 17 | Jordan Peddle |
| F | 18 | Michael St. Croix |
| F | 20 | Rhett Rachinski |
| F | 21 | Travis Ewanyk |
| F | 23 | Tyler Maxwell |
| F | 25 | Tristan Sieben |
| F | 26 | Kristians Pelss |
| F | 27 | Curtis Lazar |
| F | 29 | Mitchell Moroz |

== Road to the Cup ==
=== OHL playoffs ===
Conference Quarter-finals | Conference Semi-finals
1 | Niagara IceDogs | 4
8 | Oshawa Generals | 2
1 | Niagara IceDogs | 4
4 | Brampton Battalion | 0
4 | Brampton Battalion | 4
5 | Sudbury Wolves | 0
Eastern Conference
2 | Ottawa 67's | 4
7 | Belleville Bulls | 2
2 | Ottawa 67's | 4
3 | Barrie Colts | 3
3 | Barrie Colts | 4
6 | Mississauga St. Michael's Majors | 2
1 | London Knights | 4
8 | Windsor Spitfires | 0
1 | London Knights | 4
5 | Saginaw Spirit | 2
4 | Sarnia Sting | 2
5 | Saginaw Spirit | 4
Western Conference
2 | Plymouth Whalers | 4
7 | Guelph Storm | 2
2 | Plymouth Whalers | 3
3 | Kitchener Rangers | 4
3 | Kitchener Rangers | 4
6 | Owen Sound Attack | 1

Conference Finals
1 | Niagara IceDogs | 4
2 | Ottawa 67's | 1
1 | London Knights | 4
3 | Kitchener Rangers | 0

OHL Championship
E1 | Niagara IceDogs | 1
W1 | London Knights | 4

=== QMJHL playoffs ===
Round 1
1 | Saint John Sea Dogs | 4
16 | Cape Breton Screaming Eagles | 0
4 | Victoriaville Tigres | 0
13 | Baie-Comeau Drakkar | 4
2 | Shawinigan Cataractes | 4
15 | Rouyn-Noranda Huskies | 0
8 | Chicoutimi Saguenéens | 4
9 | Acadie–Bathurst Titan | 2
3 | Blainville-Boisbriand Armada | 4
14 | Gatineau Olympiques | 0
7 | Rimouski Océanic | 4
10 | Val-d'Or Foreurs | 0
5 | Quebec Remparts | 4
12 | Drummondville Voltigeurs | 0
6 | Halifax Mooseheads | 4
11 | Moncton Wildcats | 0

Quarter-finals
1 | Saint John Sea Dogs | 4
13 | Baie-Comeau Drakkar | 0
2 | Shawinigan Cataractes | 3
8 | Chicoutimi Saguenéens | 4
3 | Blainville-Boisbriand Armada | 3
7 | Rimouski Océanic | 4
5 | Quebec Remparts | 3
6 | Halifax Mooseheads | 4

Semi-finals
1 | Saint John Sea Dogs | 4
8 | Chicoutimi Saguenéens | 1
7 | Rimouski Océanic | 4
6 | Halifax Mooseheads | 2

President's Cup Championship
1 | Saint John Sea Dogs | 4
7 | Rimouski Océanic | 0

=== WHL playoffs ===
Conference Quarter-finals | Conference Semi-finals
1 | Edmonton Oil Kings | 4
8 | Kootenay Ice | 0
1 | Edmonton Oil Kings | 4
6 | Brandon Wheat Kings | 0
3 | Calgary Hitmen | 1
6 | Brandon Wheat Kings | 4
Eastern Conference
2 | Moose Jaw Warriors | 4
7 | Regina Pats | 1
2 | Moose Jaw Warriors | 4
4 | Medicine Hat Tigers | 0
4 | Medicine Hat Tigers | 4
5 | Saskatoon Blades | 0
1 | Tri-City Americans | 4
8 | Everett Silvertips | 0
1 | Tri-City Americans | 4
5 | Spokane Chiefs | 3
4 | Vancouver Giants | 2
5 | Spokane Chiefs | 4
Western Conference
2 | Kamloops Blazers | 4
7 | Victoria Royals | 0
2 | Kamloops Blazers | 3
3 | Portland Winterhawks | 4
3 | Portland Winterhawks | 4
6 | Kelowna Rockets | 0

Conference Finals
1 | Edmonton Oil Kings | 4
2 | Moose Jaw Warriors | 1
1 | Tri-City Americans | 0
3 | Portland Winterhawks | 4

WHL Championship
E1 | Edmonton Oil Kings | 4
W3 | Portland Winterhawks | 3
