= Michael Chaput =

Canadian ice hockey player (born 1992)

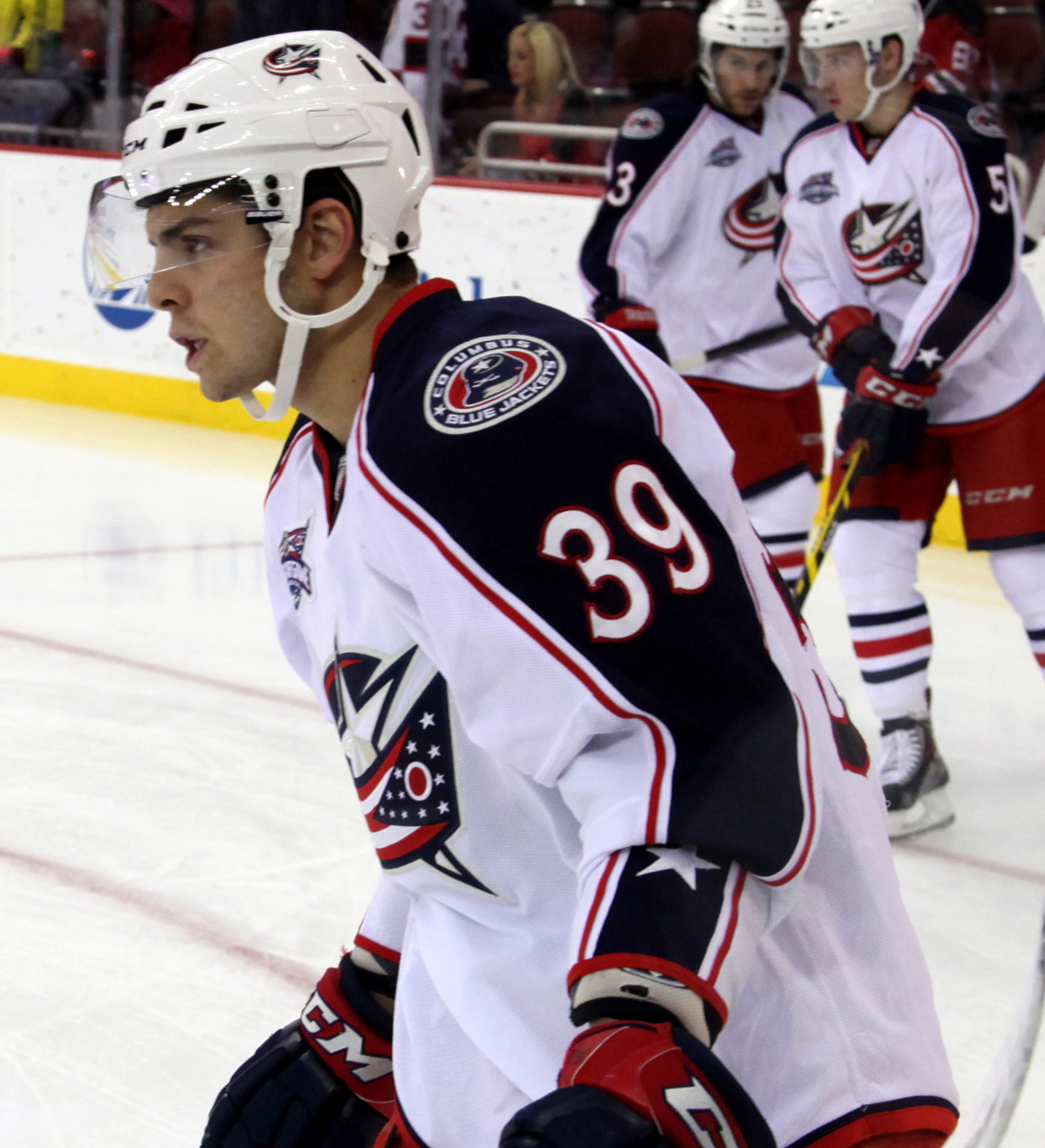
- Chaput with the Columbus Blue Jackets in 2014
- Born: April 9, 1992 (age 34) Île Bizard, Quebec, Canada
- Height: 6 ft 2 in (188 cm)
- Weight: 194 lb (88 kg; 13 st 12 lb)
- Position: Centre
- Shot: Left
- Played for: Columbus Blue Jackets; Vancouver Canucks; Montreal Canadiens; Arizona Coyotes; Barys Astana
- NHL draft: 89th overall, 2010; Philadelphia Flyers
- Playing career: 2012–2023

Michael Chaput (born April 9, 1992) is a Canadian former professional ice hockey player. He was selected in the third round, 89th overall, by the Philadelphia Flyers of the National Hockey League (NHL) in the 2010 NHL entry draft and played for the Columbus Blue Jackets, Vancouver Canucks, Montreal Canadiens, and Arizona Coyotes.

== Playing career ==
As a youth, Chaput played in the 2004 Quebec International Pee-Wee Hockey Tournament with a minor ice hockey team from Deux-Rives.

Chaput played four seasons (2008-2012) of junior hockey in the Quebec Major Junior Hockey League (QMJHL) with the Lewiston Maineiacs and Shawinigan Cataractes, scoring 77 goals and 110 assists for 187 points, while earning 238 penalty minutes, in 216 games played. He was awarded the Stafford Smythe Memorial Trophy as the most valuable player in the 2012 Memorial Cup.

On February 28, 2011, the Philadelphia Flyers traded Chaput to the Columbus Blue Jackets (along with Greg Moore) in exchange for Tom Sestito, and on April 28, 2012, the Blue Jackets signed Chaput to a three-year entry-level contract.

At the conclusion of his entry-level contract with the Blue Jackets, Chaput was not tendered a qualifying offer and was released as a free agent. On the opening day of free agency on July 1, 2016, Chaput was signed to a one-year, two-way deal with the Vancouver Canucks. The Canucks assigned Chaput their AHL affiliate, the Utica Comets to start the 2016–17 season but recalled him on November 7, 2016. On February 12, 2017, he scored two goals to help the Canucks defeat the Buffalo Sabres by a score of 4–2 for his first career multi-goal game.

On June 24, 2018, as an impending restricted free agent, the Canucks traded Chaput to the Chicago Blackhawks, in exchange for Tanner Kero. On the following day, Chaput was not tendered a qualifying offer by the Blackhawks and was released to explore free agency.

On July 1, 2018, Chaput was signed to a two-year, two-way contract with the Montreal Canadiens. He started the 2018–19 season with their American Hockey League affiliate, the Laval Rocket, but was called up on November 20, 2018 after having notched 10 points in 18 AHL games. Chaput drew into the Canadiens line-up on the fourth-line, contributing 5 assists in 32 games before he was placed on waivers and returned to the AHL. On February 25, 2019, Chaput was traded by the Canadiens to the Arizona Coyotes in exchange for Jordan Weal.

He played parts of three seasons within the Coyotes organization, before leaving as a free agent following the 2020–21 campaign. On July 29, 2021, Chaput was signed to a one-year, two-way contract with the Pittsburgh Penguins.

Following 10 professional seasons in North America, Chaput as a free agent signed his first contract abroad in agreeing to a one-year contract with Kazakh based club, Barys Astana of the KHL, on September 25, 2022.

== Personal life ==
His older brother, Stefan Chaput, formerly played professionally in the American Hockey League, and his father, Alain, once served as governor for the now-defunct Lewiston Maineiacs franchise.

== Career statistics ==
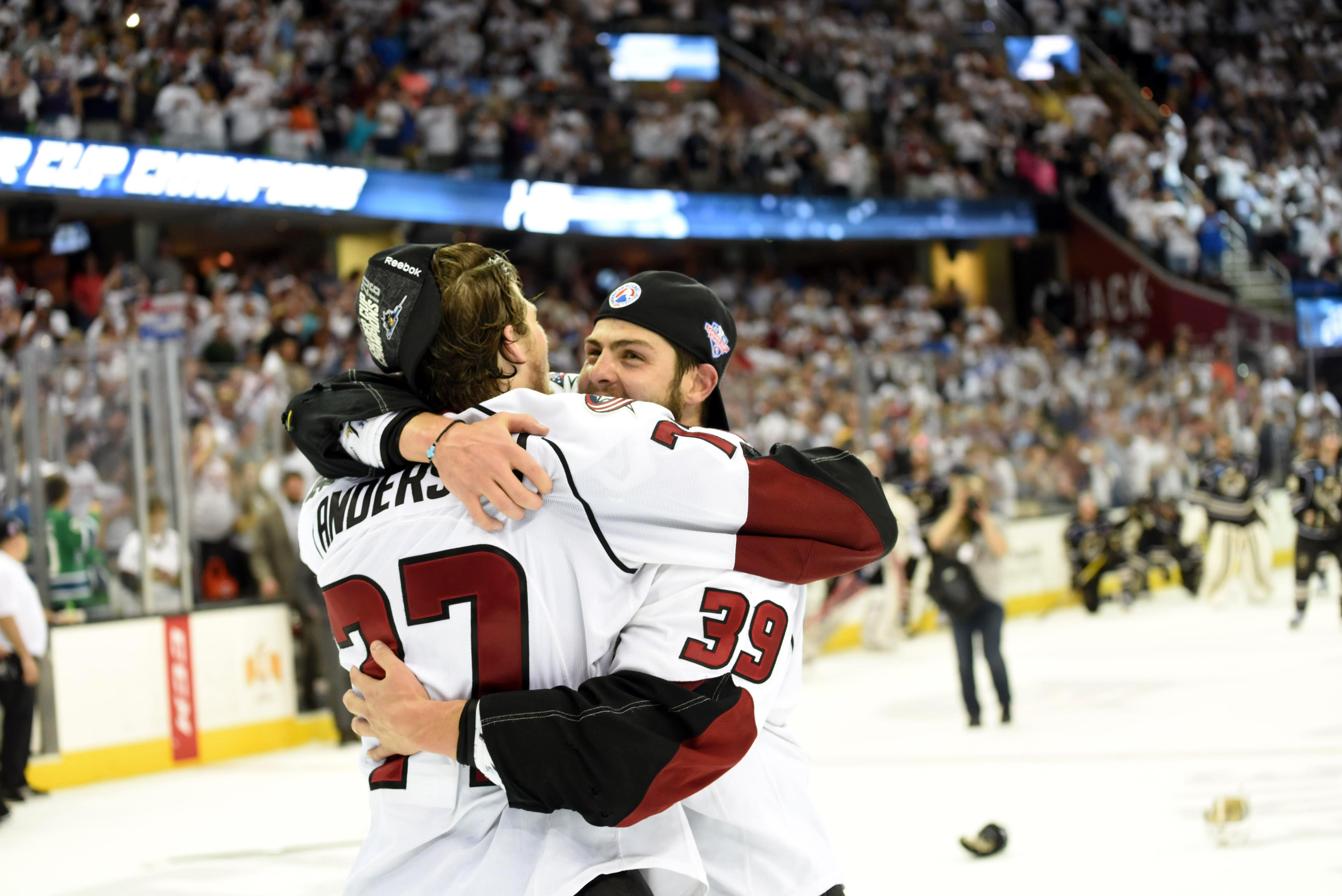
Chaput celebrating the Monsters Calder Cup victory with Josh Anderson.

			Regular season					Playoffs
Season	Team	League	GP	G	A	Pts	PIM	GP	G	A	Pts	PIM
2008–09	Lewiston Maineiacs	QMJHL	29	3	7	10	34	—	—	—	—	—
2009–10	Lewiston Maineiacs	QMJHL	68	28	27	55	60	4	0	1	1	2
2010–11	Lewiston Maineiacs	QMJHL	62	25	34	59	97	13	7	13	20	11
2011–12	Shawinigan Cataractes	QMJHL	57	21	42	63	47	11	4	8	12	2
2012–13	Springfield Falcons	AHL	73	13	19	32	57	8	1	1	2	4
2013–14	Springfield Falcons	AHL	55	19	26	45	51	5	2	1	3	6
2013–14	Columbus Blue Jackets	NHL	17	0	1	1	1	—	—	—	—	—
2014–15	Columbus Blue Jackets	NHL	33	1	4	5	21	—	—	—	—	—
2014–15	Springfield Falcons	AHL	45	10	11	21	22	—	—	—	—	—
2015–16	Lake Erie Monsters	AHL	63	16	29	45	31	17	2	6	8	13
2015–16	Columbus Blue Jackets	NHL	8	1	1	2	5	—	—	—	—	—
2016–17	Utica Comets	AHL	10	2	11	13	10	—	—	—	—	—
2016–17	Vancouver Canucks	NHL	68	4	5	9	29	—	—	—	—	—
2017–18	Utica Comets	AHL	55	17	25	42	59	5	2	1	3	4
2017–18	Vancouver Canucks	NHL	9	0	0	0	5	—	—	—	—	—
2018–19	Laval Rocket	AHL	24	10	6	16	18	—	—	—	—	—
2018–19	Montreal Canadiens	NHL	32	0	5	5	14	—	—	—	—	—
2018–19	Tucson Roadrunners	AHL	16	6	10	16	16	—	—	—	—	—
2019–20	Tucson Roadrunners	AHL	47	16	13	29	22	—	—	—	—	—
2019–20	Arizona Coyotes	NHL	2	0	0	0	2	—	—	—	—	—
2020–21	Arizona Coyotes	NHL	13	0	0	0	10	—	—	—	—	—
2021–22	Wilkes-Barre/Scranton Penguins	AHL	57	12	21	33	34	—	—	—	—	—
2022–23	Barys Astana	KHL	10	3	0	3	8	—	—	—	—	—
NHL totals			182	6	16	22	88	—	—	—	—	—

== Awards and honours ==
Awards	Year
CHL
Memorial Cup All-Star Team	2012
AHL
Calder Cup (Lake Erie Monsters)	2016
