= Laurent Brossoit =

Canadian ice hockey player (born 1993)

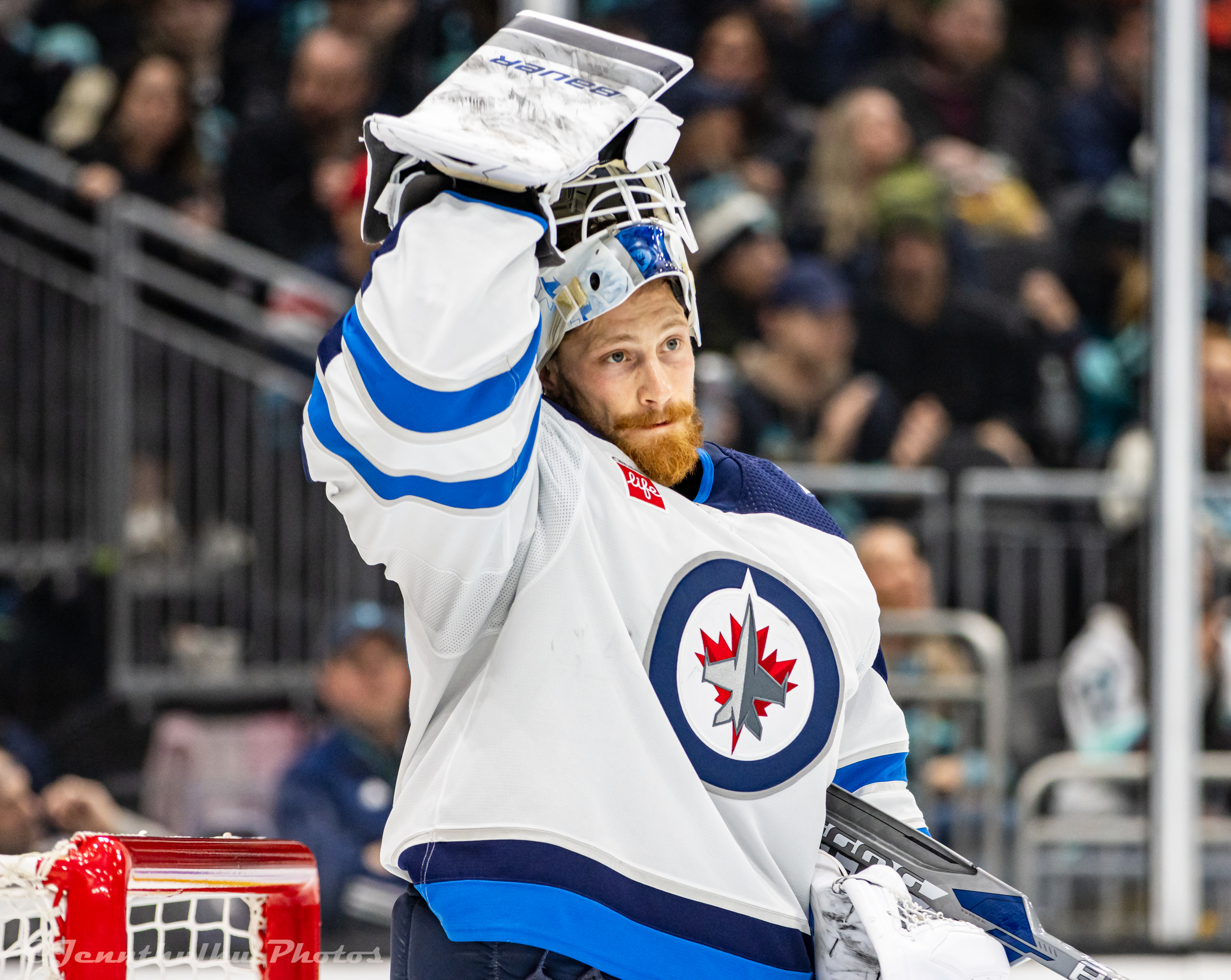
- Brossoit with the Winnipeg Jets in 2024
- Born: March 23, 1993 (age 33) Port Alberni, British Columbia, Canada
- Height: 6 ft 3 in (191 cm)
- Weight: 204 lb (93 kg; 14 st 8 lb)
- Position: Goaltender
- Catches: Left
- NHL team (P) Cur. team Former teams: Anaheim Ducks; San Diego Gulls (AHL); Edmonton Oilers; Winnipeg Jets; Vegas Golden Knights; San Jose Sharks
- NHL draft: 164th overall, 2011; Calgary Flames
- Playing career: 2013–present

Laurent Brossoit (born March 23, 1993) is a Canadian professional ice hockey player who is a goaltender for the Anaheim Ducks in the National Hockey League. Brossoit won the Stanley Cup with the Vegas Golden Knights in 2023.

Brossoit was selected by the Calgary Flames in the sixth round, 164th overall, of the 2011 NHL entry draft and played for the Edmonton Oilers and Winnipeg Jets prior to joining the Golden Knights. He was born in Port Alberni, British Columbia, but grew up in Cloverdale, British Columbia.

== Playing career ==
=== Amateur ===
In 2008, Brossoit was chosen in the second round, 26th overall, of the 2008 WHL Bantam Draft by the Edmonton Oil Kings. In the 2008–09 season, Brossoit played in 20 games for the Valley West Hawks of the BCMML. Brossoit saw his first Western Hockey League (WHL) action with the Oil Kings, playing one game.

During the 2009–10 season, Brossoit spent most of the season with the Cowichan Valley Capitals of the BCHL. In 21 games, Brossoit registered a 3.66 goals against average (GAA), a .901 save percentage and a 10–8–0 record. In five playoff games, he registered a 3.93 GAA and a .911 save percentage. Brossoit played in two games for the Oil Kings, posting a 2.80 GAA and a .944 save percentage. Brossoit played for Team Pacific at the 2010 World U-17 Hockey Challenge, posting a 2.00 GAA and a .902 save percentage in two games.

In his WHL rookie season, in 2010–11, Brossoit played in 34 games for the Oil Kings. He registered a 3.32 GAA and a .887 save percentage. In two playoff games, Brossoit posted a 3.58 GAA, a .875 save percentage and a 13–12–2 record.

In his second WHL, 2011–12, Brossoit was a workhorse for WHL champions Edmonton and helped guide the Oil Kings to a WHL championship and a berth into the 2012 Memorial Cup. He had a record of 42–13–5 with 3 shutouts in 61 games and posted a 2.47 GAA and .914 save percentage for the year. The Oil Kings finished with the WHL's best record in winning the Central Division and rolled through the playoffs. Brossoit was 16–4 with two shutouts and had a 2.04 GAA and .933 save percentage. He started all four games at the Memorial Cup and was 1–3 with a 4.04 GAA and .871 save percentage.

On April 2, 2013, Brossoit was named as Canadian Hockey League (CHL) Goaltender of the Week after posting a 4–1–0–0 record with two shutouts along with a 0.76 GAA and .968 save percentage in the opening round of the WHL Eastern Conference playoff series that saw the Oil Kings defeat the Kootenay Ice four games to one.

=== Professional ===
==== Calgary Flames organization and Edmonton Oilers (2013–2018) ====
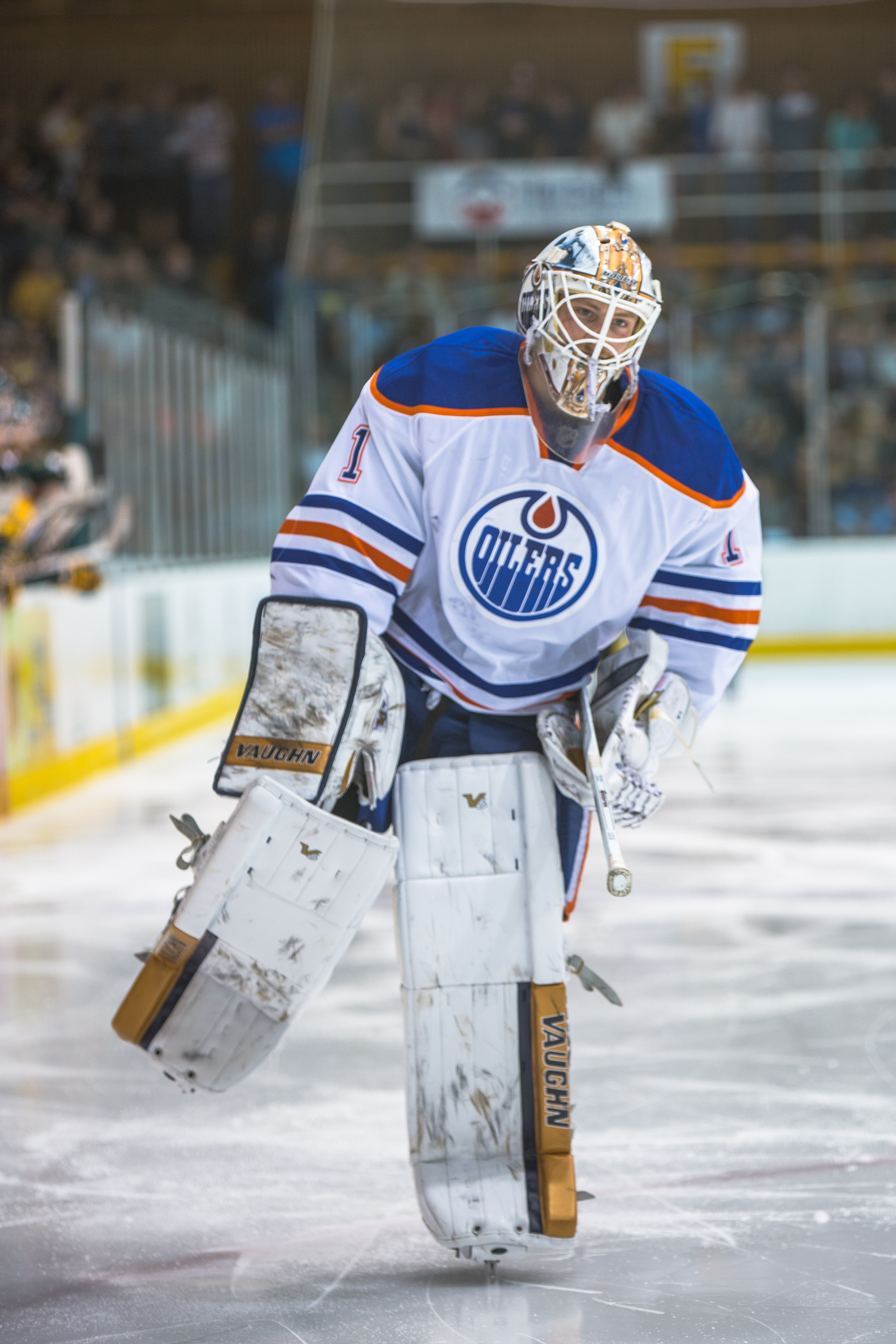
Brossoit with the Edmonton Oilers in 2014

On April 4, 2013, the NHL's Calgary Flames signed Brossoit to an entry-level contract. Despite rumours of continuing his successful Memorial Cup season with the Flames for the end of the 2012–13 NHL season, Brossoit was not called-up.

On November 8, 2013, Brossoit was traded to the Edmonton Oilers. On March 24, 2014, after playing 30 games in the ECHL with the Bakersfield Condors and eight games in the American Hockey League (AHL) with the Oklahoma City Barons, Brossoit received his first NHL call-up to backup Oilers' starter Ben Scrivens.

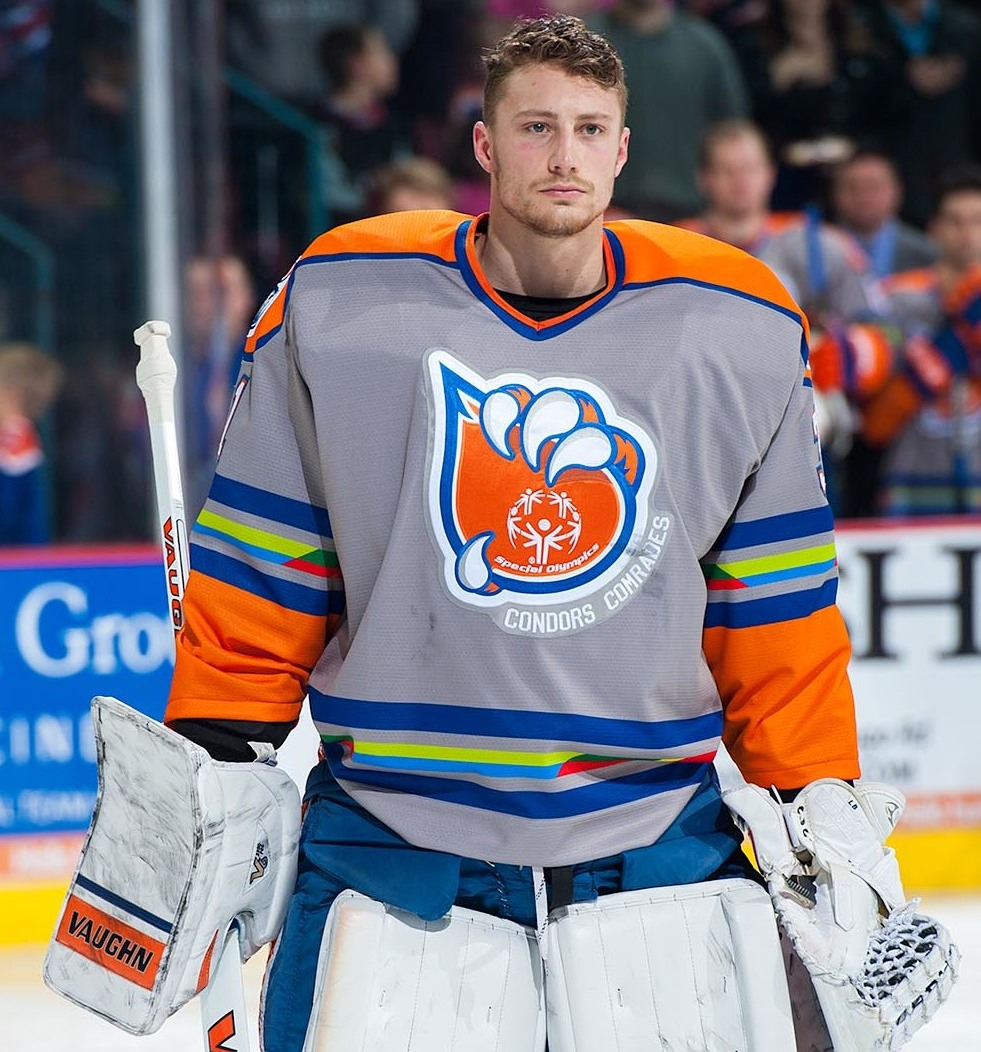
Brossoit with the Bakersfield Condors in 2016.

On January 21, 2017, Brossoit earned his first NHL win in a game against the Calgary Flames.

==== Winnipeg Jets (2018–2021) ====
After five seasons within the Oilers organization, Brossoit left as a free agent following the 2017–18 season. On July 1, 2018, he signed a one-year, two-way contract with the Winnipeg Jets. While playing with the Jets, Brossoit earned his first career NHL shutout in a 1–0 win over the Vancouver Canucks on December 22. He made 40 saves in the win.

On May 25, 2019, the Jets re-signed Brossoit to a one-year, $1.225 million contract. He signed another one-year contract on October 2, 2020, this time with a salary of $1.5 million.

==== Vegas Golden Knights (2021–2023) ====
On July 28, 2021, following his third season with the Jets, Brossoit left as a free agent and was signed a two-year, $4.65 million contract with the Vegas Golden Knights. In his first season with the team, he served as backup to Robin Lehner and recorded a 10–9–3 record and .895 save percentage. However, it was announced that he required hip surgery in the off-season that would leave him unavailable for the beginning of the 2022–23 season.

Following Brossoit's return from hip surgery, the Golden Knights' management opted to have him begin with the franchise's AHL affiliate, the Henderson Silver Knights. Brossoit was waived by the Golden Knights on November 10, 2022, and cleared waivers the following day. Injuries to both Logan Thompson and Adin Hill eventually prompted Brossoit's recall to the NHL, playing alongside former Los Angeles Kings starter Jonathan Quick, who the team acquired midseason.

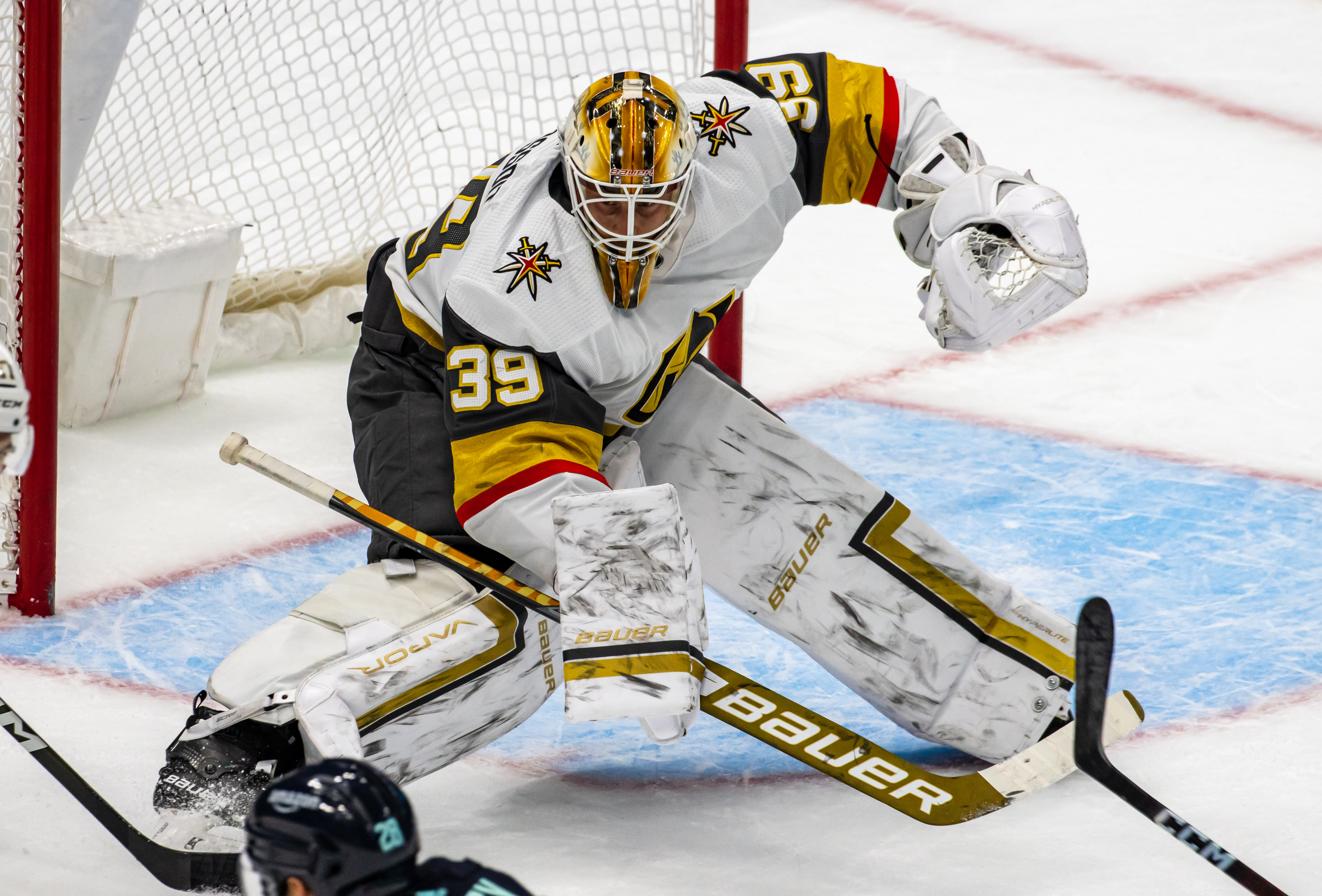
Brossoit with the Golden Knights in 2023.

The Golden Knights finished first in the Western Conference to qualify for the 2023 Stanley Cup playoffs, with Brossoit named the starting goaltender for their first-round series against the Winnipeg Jets; Brossoit's starting role against his former team and partner Connor Hellebuyck attracted media attention. The Golden Knights prevailed in five games. In Game 3 of the team's second-round series against the Edmonton Oilers, Brossoit exited the game after injuring himself in the process of making a save. Hill took over the net, leading the team onward to the 2023 Stanley Cup Final. The Golden Knights defeated the Florida Panthers in five games, and Brossoit joined the team in hoisting the Stanley Cup.

==== Return to Winnipeg (2023–2024) ====
On July 1, 2023, Brossoit signed a one-year, $1.75M contract with the Jets to return to Winnipeg. The 2023–24 season proved a great success for the Jets, who finished fourth in the league, while Brossoit called it "a blessing to be here" while seeking to reestablish his ability to play and remain healthy after previous injuries. He was the Jets' nominee for the Bill Masterton Memorial Trophy, awarded by the Professional Hockey Writers' Association to the player who "exemplifies the qualities of perseverance, sportsmanship and dedication to the game." The Jets allowed a league-low 199 goals over 82 games, earning the William M. Jennings Trophy as a result, but Brossoit was not eligible to have his name on the trophy as he had played only 23 games, two short of the minimum to qualify.

==== Chicago Blackhawks organization (2024–2026) ====
As a free agent at the conclusion of his one-year deal with the Jets, Brossoit was signed to a two-year, $6.6 million contract with the Chicago Blackhawks on July 1, 2024. Brossoit underwent meniscus surgery on August 27, missing the start of the Blackhawks training camp, and the entirety of the 2024–25 season. Prior to the start of the 2025–26 NHL season, Blackhawks general manager Kyle Davidson announced that Brossoit underwent hip surgery and would remain out of lineup indefinitely. Brossoit finally returned from his injury in December 2025, playing six games for the AHL Rockford IceHogs on a conditioning stint.

==== San Jose Sharks (2026) ====
On January 8, 2026, Brossoit was traded to the San Jose Sharks, alongside Nolan Allan and a seventh-round pick in 2028, in exchange for Ryan Ellis, Jake Furlong, and a fourth-round pick in 2028; as a result, he ended his Blackhawks tenure never having played a game for the team.

==== Anaheim Ducks (2026–present) ====
As a free agent at the conclusion of his contract with the Sharks, Brossoit was signed by the Anaheim Ducks to a one-year, $1.1 million contract on July 1, 2026.

== Career statistics ==
=== Regular season and playoffs ===
			Regular season									Playoffs
Season	Team	League	GP	W	L	T/OT	MIN	GA	SO	GAA	SV%	GP	W	L	MIN	GA	SO	GAA	SV%
2008–09	Edmonton Oil Kings	WHL	1	0	0	0	37	5	0	8.20	.773	—	—	—	—	—	—	—	—
2009–10	Cowichan Valley Capitals	BCHL	21	10	8	0	999	61	2	3.66	.901	5	1	3	259	17	0	3.94	.912
2009–10	Edmonton Oil Kings	WHL	2	0	1	0	86	4	0	2.80	.944	—	—	—	—	—	—	—	—
2010–11	Edmonton Oil Kings	WHL	34	13	12	2	1664	92	2	3.32	.887	2	0	2	117	7	0	3.58	.875
2011–12	Edmonton Oil Kings	WHL	61	42	13	5	3574	147	3	2.47	.914	20	16	4	1204	41	2	2.04	.933
2012–13	Edmonton Oil Kings	WHL	49	33	8	6	2854	107	5	2.25	.917	22	14	8	1322	40	5	1.82	.935
2013–14	Abbotsford Heat	AHL	2	0	1	0	94	9	0	5.72	.824	—	—	—	—	—	—	—	—
2013–14	Alaska Aces	ECHL	3	2	0	0	126	0	2	0.00	1.000	—	—	—	—	—	—	—	—
2013–14	Oklahoma City Barons	AHL	8	2	5	0	416	25	0	3.60	.888	—	—	—	—	—	—	—	—
2013–14	Bakersfield Condors	ECHL	35	24	9	2	2079	74	6	2.14	.923	16	10	6	976	37	3	2.27	.921
2014–15	Oklahoma City Barons	AHL	53	25	22	4	3049	130	4	2.56	.918	2	1	0	87	5	0	3.46	.909
2014–15	Edmonton Oilers	NHL	1	0	1	0	60	2	0	2.00	.961	—	—	—	—	—	—	—	—
2015–16	Bakersfield Condors	AHL	31	18	9	3	1807	80	3	2.66	.920	—	—	—	—	—	—	—	—
2015–16	Edmonton Oilers	NHL	5	0	4	1	300	18	0	3.60	.873	—	—	—	—	—	—	—	—
2016–17	Bakersfield Condors	AHL	21	9	8	0	1189	53	2	2.67	.908	—	—	—	—	—	—	—	—
2016–17	Edmonton Oilers	NHL	8	4	1	0	333	11	0	1.99	.928	1	0	0	28	2	0	4.42	.750
2017–18	Edmonton Oilers	NHL	14	3	7	1	741	40	0	3.24	.883	—	—	—	—	—	—	—	—
2017–18	Bakersfield Condors	AHL	29	15	10	4	1768	79	0	2.68	.912	—	—	—	—	—	—	—	—
2018–19	Winnipeg Jets	NHL	21	13	6	2	1166	49	1	2.52	.925	—	—	—	—	—	—	—	—
2019–20	Winnipeg Jets	NHL	19	6	7	1	988	54	0	3.28	.895	—	—	—	—	—	—	—	—
2020–21	Winnipeg Jets	NHL	14	6	6	0	744	30	1	2.42	.918	—	—	—	—	—	—	—	—
2021–22	Vegas Golden Knights	NHL	24	10	9	3	1282	62	1	2.90	.895	—	—	—	—	—	—	—	—
2022–23	Henderson Silver Knights	AHL	23	8	11	3	1322	60	2	2.72	.909	—	—	—	—	—	—	—	—
2022–23	Vegas Golden Knights	NHL	11	7	0	3	637	23	0	2.17	.927	8	5	2	434	23	0	3.18	.894
2023–24	Winnipeg Jets	NHL	23	15	5	2	1351	45	3	2.00	.927	1	0	0	18	0	0	0.00	1.000
2025–26	Rockford IceHogs	AHL	6	3	3	0	355	20	0	3.38	.901	—	—	—	—	—	—	—	—
2025–26	San Jose Barracuda	AHL	22	12	8	1	1294	64	0	2.97	.901	2	0	2	119	8	0	4.04	.884
2025–26	San Jose Sharks	NHL	1	0	1	0	59	5	0	5.07	.783	—	—	—	—	—	—	—	—
NHL totals			141	64	47	13	7,657	339	6	2.66	.910	10	5	2	479	25	0	3.13	.890

== Awards and honours ==
Award	Year	Ref
ECHL
All-Rookie Team	2013–14	
NHL
Stanley Cup champion	2023	
