= 2013 IIHF Women's World Championship Division I =

International ice hockey competition

Tournament details
- Host countries: Norway; France
- Venues: 2 (in 2 host cities)
- Dates: 7–13 April 2013
- Teams: 12

The 2013 IIHF Women's World Championship Division I consisted of two international ice hockey tournaments organized by the International Ice Hockey Federation. Division I A and Division I B represent the second and third tier of the IIHF Women's World Championship.

== Division I Group A ==
2013 IIHF Women's World Championship Division I A
Tournament details
- Host country: Norway
- City: Stavanger
- Venue: 1 (in 1 host city)
- Dates: 7–13 April 2013
- Teams: 6

Tournament statistics
- Matches played: 15
- Goals scored: 84 (5.6 per match)

The Division I Group A tournament was played at DNB Arena in Stavanger, Norway, from 7 to 13 April 2013.

The winners of this tournament were initially presumed to be promoted to the 2015 Top Division. However, with the Divisions I and II playing in an Olympic year, and the eight Olympic entries being in none of those tournaments, it was determined that the last-placed Olympic team will play a challenge series with the 2014 Division I Group A champion for promotion to the 2015 Top Division. So Japan, as the last team of the 2014 Olympics, did not participate in the World Championships in 2014 and advanced to the 2015 Top Division playoff.

The last-placed team of the Division I Group A was relegated to the Division I Group B for 2014.

=== Participating teams ===
Team	Qualification
Slovakia	placed 8th in Top Division last year and were relegated
Norway	hosts; placed 2nd in Division I A last year
Japan	placed 3rd in Division I A last year
Austria	placed 4th in Division I A last year
Latvia	placed 5th in Division I A last year
Denmark	placed 1st in Division I B last year and were promoted

=== Final standings ===
Pos	Team	Pld	W	OTW	OTL	L	GF	GA	GD	Pts	Relegation
1	Japan	5	4	0	1	0	17	7	+10	13	
2	Denmark	5	3	1	0	1	15	9	+6	11	
3	Slovakia	5	3	0	0	2	15	10	+5	9	
4	Austria	5	2	0	1	2	15	16	−1	7	
5	Norway (H)	5	1	1	0	3	13	15	−2	5	
6	Latvia	5	0	0	0	5	9	27	−18	0	Relegated to the 2014 Division I B

Source: IIHF
(H) Host

=== Match results ===
All times are local (Central European Summer Time – UTC+2).

7 April 2013; 12:30	Latvia	0–5 (0–3, 0–0, 0–2)	Japan	DNB Arena, Stavanger; Attendance: 113

Game reference

Evija Tētiņa
Goalies
Azusa Nakaoku
Referee:
(Finland) Anna Eskola
Linesmen:
(Russia) Elena Ivanova
(Estonia) Kaire Leet

0–1	05:02 – T.Sakagami
0–2	06:27 – Y. Hirano (A. Nakamura, H. Kubo)
0–3	19:03 – Y.Hirano (H. Kubo, A. Nakamura)
0–4	53:15 – M. Fujimoto (Y. Adachi, R. Ukita)
0–5	57:24 – H. Yoneyama (C. Osawa, M. Shishiuchi)

10 min
Penalties
10 min
17
Shots
51

7 April 2013; 16:00	Denmark	2–1 (2–0, 0–1, 0–0)	Slovakia	DNB Arena, Stavanger; Attendance: 93

Game reference

Kamilla Lund Nielsen
Goalies
Zuzana Tomčíková
Referee:
(United States) Katie Guay
Linesmen:
(Norway) Anna Nygard
(Netherlands) Bianca Schipper-Poeteray

J. Jakobsen (M. Henriksen) (PP) – 05:02	1–0
N. Jensen (J. Gregersen) – 10:49	2–0
	2–1	29:07 – A. Džurňáková (M. Matejová) (PP)

8 min
Penalties
10 min
46
Shots
36

7 April 2013; 19:30	Austria	3–4 OT (1–1, 2–1, 0–1) (OT: 0–1)	Norway	DNB Arena, Stavanger; Attendance: 317

Game reference

Paula Marchhart
Goalies
Jorid Dagfinrud
Referee:
(Finland) Paivi Laurla
Linesmen:
(Czech Republic) Michaela Štefková
(Germany) Svenja Strohmenger

J. Willenshofer (E. Kantor) – 05:53	1–0
	1–1	06:41 – M. Gunther (L. Bialik)
J. Weber (D. Altmann, S. Ban) – 33:02	2–1
	2–2	33:38 – M. Haug-Hansan (H. Martinsen)
D. Altmann (A. Schneider) – 38:03	3–2
	3–3	51:43 – H.Martinsen (M. Haug-Hansen) (PP)
	3–4	61:59 – A. Schjelderup Dalen (S.Holos)

10 min
Penalties
10 min
20
Shots
45

9 April 2013; 12:30	Japan	1–2 GWS (0–1, 1–0, 0–0) (OT 0–0) (SO: 0–1)	Denmark	DNB Arena, Stavanger; Attendance: 45

Game reference
Azusa Nakaoku	Goalies	Kamilla Lund Nielsen	Referee: (Czech Republic) Ludmila Nelibová; Linesmen: (Norway) Marlen Vedvik Hansen (Germany) Svenja Strohmenger
/ 0–1 / 08:41 – C. Densing; R. Ukita (A. Aoki) – 22:39 / 1–1			Referee: (Czech Republic) Ludmila Nelibová; Linesmen: (Norway) Marlen Vedvik Hansen (Germany) Svenja Strohmenger
C. Osawa (miss); H. Kubo; T. Sakagami (miss); H. Kubo (miss)	Shootout	(miss) J. Jakobsen; (miss) N. Jensen; J. Gregersen; J. Jakobsen	Referee: (Czech Republic) Ludmila Nelibová; Linesmen: (Norway) Marlen Vedvik Hansen (Germany) Svenja Strohmenger
6 min	Penalties	10 min	Referee: (Czech Republic) Ludmila Nelibová; Linesmen: (Norway) Marlen Vedvik Hansen (Germany) Svenja Strohmenger
39	Shots	19	Referee: (Czech Republic) Ludmila Nelibová; Linesmen: (Norway) Marlen Vedvik Hansen (Germany) Svenja Strohmenger

9 April 2013; 16:00	Slovakia	3–1 (1–1, 1–0, 1–0)	Austria	DNB Arena, Stavanger; Attendance: 51

Game reference

Zuzana Tomčíková
Goalies
Paula Marchhart
Referee:
(Finland) Anna Eskola
Linesmen:
(Russia) Elena Ivanova
(Czech Republic) Michaela Štefková

	0–1	05:17 – E. Kantor (J. Weber, E-M. Verworner)
M. Matejová (M. Herichová, A. Džurňáková) – 09:07	1–1
A. Miháliková (J. Kapustová, L. Sroková) – 34:08	2–1
L. Lučová (M. Veličková) – 41:30	3–1

12 min
Penalties
18 min
42
Shots
32

9 April 2013; 19:30	Norway	7–4 (2–1, 3–2, 2–1)	Latvia	DNB Arena, Stavanger; Attendance: 135

Game reference

Christine Smestad
Goalies
Evija Tētiņa
Referee:
(United States) Katie Guay
Linesmen:
(Estonia) Kaire Leet
(Netherlands) Bianca Schipper-Poeteray

I. Morset (M. Carlsson, I. Farstad) (PP) – 02:23	1–0
M. Carlsson (I. Farstad, A. Schjelderup Dalen) (PP) – 06:51	2–0
	2–1	11:29 – I. Pētersone
L. Bialik (M. Carlsson) (SH) – 25:09	3–1
H. Martinsen (M. Haug-Hansen) – 28:19	4–1
	4–2	29:39 – I. Koka (I. Bičevska, S. Ozmena)
	4–3	30:20 – I. Pētersone (S. Ozmena) (PP)
B. Lersbryggen (M. Haug-Hansen, M. Berg-Iversen) (PP) – 38:54	5–3
	5–4	50:47 – L. Miljone (A. Kubliņa)
I. Morset (L. Bialik, A. Schjelderup Dalen) (PP) – 51:49	6–4
L. Bialik (I. Farstad) – 53:44	7–4

14 min
Penalties
10 min
44
Shots
18

10 April 2013; 12:30	Denmark	2–4 (0–2, 1–1, 1–1)	Austria	DNB Arena, Stavanger; Attendance: 60

Game reference

Kamilla Lund Nielsen
Goalies
Paula Marchhart
Referee:
(Czech Republic) Ludmila Nelibová
Linesmen:
(Estonia) Kaire Leet
(Netherlands) Bianca Schipper-Poeteray

	0–1	00:37 – V. Hummel (A. Meixner, J. Weber)
	0–2	07:11 – E. Kantor (D. Altmann) (PP)
L. Ernst (PS) – 31:48	1–2
	1–3	34:47 – V. Hummel (A. Meixner)
	1–4	54:19 – V. Hummel (J. Weber)
H. Ostergaard (M. Henriksen) (PP) – 57:54	2–4

16 min
Penalties
18 min
26
Shots
32

10 April 2013; 16:00	Slovakia	4–2 (1–0, 1–0, 2–2)	Latvia	DNB Arena, Stavanger; Attendance: 98

Game reference

Zuzana Tomčíková
Goalies
Evija Tētiņa
Referee:
(Finland) Paivi Laurla
Linesmen:
(Norway) Marlen Vedvik Hansen
(Norway) Anna Nygard

L. Sroková – 08:40	1–0
M. Veličková (J. Čulíková) – 34:38	2–0
	2–1	42:55 – L. Miljone
N. Gápová (A. Džurňáková) – 43:24	3–1
	3–2	59:11 – L. Dekmeijere-Trigubova (I. Koka) (EA)
J. Kapustová (ENG) – 59:24	4–2

4 min
Penalties
12 min
46
Shots
19

10 April 2013; 19:30	Norway	0–1 (0–1, 0–0, 0–0)	Japan	DNB Arena, Stavanger; Attendance: 457

Game reference
Christine Smestad	Goalies	Azusa Nakaoku	Referee: (Finland) Anna Eskola; Linesmen: (Russia) Elena Ivanova (Czech Republic) Michaela Štefková
0–1 / 12:44 – C. Osawa (T. Sakagami, H. Kubo)			Referee: (Finland) Anna Eskola; Linesmen: (Russia) Elena Ivanova (Czech Republic) Michaela Štefková
8 min	Penalties	14 min	Referee: (Finland) Anna Eskola; Linesmen: (Russia) Elena Ivanova (Czech Republic) Michaela Štefková
17	Shots	22	Referee: (Finland) Anna Eskola; Linesmen: (Russia) Elena Ivanova (Czech Republic) Michaela Štefková

12 April 2013; 12:30	Austria	5–2 (3–0, 0–2, 2–0)	Latvia	DNB Arena, Stavanger; Attendance: 78

Game reference

Paula Marchhart
Goalies
Evija Tētiņa
Referee:
(Czech Republic) Ludmila Nelibová
Linesmen:
(Norway) Marlen Vedvik Hansen
(Czech Republic) Michaela Štefková

D. Altmann (S. Volgger) – 13:21	1–0
J. Weber (V. Hummel) – 14:34	2–0
D. Altmann (S. Ban, J. Willenshofer) – 15:57	3–0
	3–1	34:49 – I. Bičevska (L. Miljone) (SH)
	3–2	37:16 – S. Ozmena
D. Altmann (E. Kantor) – 54:02	4–2
S. Volgger (S. Ban) – 56:17	5–2

8 min
Penalties
4 min
46
Shots
22

12 April 2013; 16:00	Japan	5–3 (2–0, 0–3, 3–0)	Slovakia	DNB Arena, Stavanger; Attendance: 83

Game reference

Azusa Nakaoku
Goalies
Zuzana Tomčíková
Referee:
(United States) Katie Guay
Linesmen:
(Russia) Elena Ivanova
(Norway) Anna Nygard

H. Yoneyama – 07:32	1–0
T. Sakagami (C. Osawa, H. Kubo) – 08:06	2–0
	2–1	25:51 – J. Kapustová (P. Pravlíková, L. Sroková) (PP)
	2–2	29:16 – A. Miháliková
	2–3	33:53 – V. Ihnaťová (J. Čulíková)
H. Yoneyama (T. Sakagami, C. Osawa) – 46:58	3–3
M. Shishiuchi (A. Toko, K. Aoki) (PP) – 49:39	4–3
H. Kubo (Y. Hirano) (ENG) – 59:20	5–3

8 min
Penalties
8 min
45
Shots
21

12 April 2013; 19:30	Norway	2–3 (0–2, 2–1, 0–0)	Denmark	DNB Arena, Stavanger; Attendance: 573

Game reference

Christine Smestad
Goalies
Kamilla Lund Nielsen
Referee:
(Finland) Paivi Laurla
Linesmen:
(Estonia) Kaire Leet
(Germany) Svenja Strohmenger

	0–1	02:27 – H. Ostergaard (L. Ernst) (PP)
	0–2	17:12 – H. Ostergaard (J. Jakobsen)
A. Schjelderup Dalen (L. Bialik) (PP2) – 20:46	1–2
I. Morset (L. Bial) – 22:37	2–2
	2–3	25:01 – M. Olausson (N. Jensen, J. Persson) (PP)

12 min
Penalties
8 min
22
Shots
28

13 April 2013; 12:30	Latvia	1–6 (1–1, 0–3, 0–2)	Denmark	DNB Arena, Stavanger; Attendance: 125

Game reference

Evija Tētiņa
Goalies
Kamilla Lund Nielsen
Referee:
(United States) Katie Guay
Linesmen:
(Norway) Marlen Vedvik Hansen
(Netherlands) Bianca Schipper-Poeteray

	0–1	07:26 – H. Ostergaard (M. Henriksen)
L. Miljone (I. Geca-Miljone) – 13:02	1–1
	1–2	20:41 – L. Ernst (M. Henriksen)
	1–3	20:52 – J. Persson (M. Frandsen)
	1–4	30:16 – M. Henriksen (J. Jakobsen)
	1–5	48:48 – J. Jakobsen (M. Henriksen, L. Ernst)
	1–6	49:28 – M. Henriksen (J. Jakobsen)

4 min
Penalties
10 min
22
Shots
64

13 April 2013; 16:00	Japan	5–2 (3–1, 0–1, 2–0)	Austria	DNB Arena, Stavanger; Attendance: 103

Game reference

Azusa Nakaoku
Goalies
Paula Marchhart
Referee:
(Finland) Paivi Laurla
Linesmen:
(Norway) Anna Nygard
(Germany) Svenja Strohmenger

M. Fujimoto (M. Shishiuchi) – 01:26	1–0
	1–1	07:44 – J. Weber (A. Meixner)
S. Koike (H. Kubo, T. Sakagami) (PP) – 12:47	2–1
C. Osawa (K. Aoki, Y. Hirano) (PP) – 14:21	3–1
	3–2	39:23 – J. Weber (V. Hummel)
A. Nakamura (S. Suzuki, H. Kubo) – 45:59	4–2
S. Suzuki (ENG) – 59:39	5–2

6 min
Penalties
8 min
44
Shots
30

13 April 2013; 19:30	Slovakia	4–0 (1–0, 1–0, 2–0)	Norway	DNB Arena, Stavanger; Attendance: 472

Game reference

Zuzana Tomčíková
Goalies
Jorid Dagfinrud
Referee:
(Finland) Anna Eskola
Linesmen:
(Estonia) Kaire Leet
(Czech Republic) Michaela Štefková

M. Matejová (J. Kapustová) (PP) – 16:15	1–0
A. Miháliková (J. Kapustová, G. Žitňanská) – 21:29	2–0
J. Kapustová – 51:08	3–0
A. Miháliková (SH) – 56:54	4–0

12 min
Penalties
10 min
24
Shots
40

=== Statistics and awards ===
==== Scoring leaders ====
Pos	Player	Country	GP	G	A	Pts	+/−	PIM
1	Janine Weber	Austria	5	4	3	7	+7	6
2	Marie Henriksen	Denmark	5	2	5	7	+1	2
3	Hanae Kubo	Japan	5	1	6	7	+5	4
4	Denise Altmann	Austria	5	4	2	6	0	4
5	Josefine Jakobsen	Denmark	5	3	3	6	+2	12
6	Jana Kapustová	Slovakia	5	3	3	6	+3	2
7	Line Bialik Øien	Norway	5	2	4	6	–2	0
8	Victoria Hummel	Austria	5	3	2	5	+3	0
9	Esther Kantor	Austria	5	2	3	5	–1	4
9	Chiho Osawa	Japan	5	2	3	5	+3	2
9	Tomoko Sakagami	Japan	5	2	3	5	+2	2

GP = Games played; G = Goals; A = Assists; Pts = Points; +/− = Plus–minus; PIM = Penalties In Minutes
Source: IIHF.com

==== Goaltending leaders ====
(minimum 40% team's total ice time)

Pos	Player	Country	TOI	GA	GAA	Sv%	SO
1	Zuzana Tomčíková	Slovakia	298:55	9	1.81	95.05	1
2	Kamilla Lund Nielsen	Denmark	304:00	9	1.78	94.04	0
3	Azusa Nakaoku	Japan	305:00	7	1.38	93.27	2
4	Paula Marchhart	Austria	300:18	15	3.00	91.62	0
5	Evija Tētiņa	Latvia	299:37	26	5.21	89.60	0

TOI = Time on ice (minutes:seconds); GA = Goals against; GAA = Goals against average; Sv% = Save percentage; SO = Shutouts
Source: IIHF.com

==== Directorate Awards ====
- Goaltender: Kamilla Lund Nielsen, Denmark
- Defenseman: Ayaka Toko, Japan
- Forward: Line Bialik Øien, Norway

Source: IIHF.com

== Division I Group B ==
2013 IIHF Women's World Championship Division I B
Tournament details
- Host country: France
- City: Strasbourg
- Venue: 1 (in 1 host city)
- Dates: 7–13 April 2013
- Teams: 6

Tournament statistics
- Matches played: 15
- Goals scored: 86 (5.73 per match)

The Division I Group B tournament was played from 7 to 13 April 2013 at Patinoire Iceberg in Strasbourg, France.

The winners of this tournament were promoted to the Division I Group A, while the last-placed team was relegated to the Division II Group A for 2014.

=== Participating teams ===
Team	Qualification
Kazakhstan	placed 6th in Division I A last year and were relegated
China	placed 2nd in Division I B last year
France	hosts; placed 3rd in Division I B last year
Great Britain	placed 4th in Division I B last year
Netherlands	placed 5th in Division I B last year
North Korea	placed 1st in Division II A last year and were promoted

=== Final standings ===
Pos	Team	Pld	W	OTW	OTL	L	GF	GA	GD	Pts	Promotion or relegation
1	France (H)	5	5	0	0	0	23	4	+19	15	Promoted to the 2014 Division I A
2	Netherlands	5	3	1	0	1	16	12	+4	11	
3	North Korea	5	1	1	1	2	12	17	−5	6	
4	China	5	2	0	0	3	15	15	0	6	
5	Kazakhstan	5	1	1	0	3	12	16	−4	5	
6	Great Britain	5	0	0	2	3	8	22	−14	2	Relegated to the 2014 Division II A

Source: IIHF
(H) Host

=== Match results ===
All times are local (Central European Summer Time – UTC+2).

7 April 2013; 12:30	Great Britain	1–6 (1–2, 0–2, 0–2)	China	Patinoire Iceberg, Strasbourg; Attendance: 307

Game reference

Nicole Jackson
Goalies
Jia Dandan
Wang Yuquin
Referee:
(Russia) Arina Ustinova
Linesmen:
(France) Anne Sophie Boniface
(Denmark) Trine Viskum

	0–1	03:24 – Zhang M. (Yu B.)
K. Henry (K. Gale) (PP) – 05:19	1–1
	1–2	17:46 – Zhang M. (Gao F.) (SH)
	1–3	20:51 – Zhang M. (Yu B.)
	1–4	38:25 – Kong M. (Zhang B.)
	1–5	46:57 – Sun R. (Fang X.)
	1–6	49:12 – Sun R.

8 min
Penalties
12 min
24
Shots
29

7 April 2013; 16:00	North Korea	2–6 (0–1, 2–2, 0–3)	Kazakhstan	Patinoire Iceberg, Strasbourg; Attendance: 382

Game reference

Ri Hye-Yong
So Jong-Sim
Goalies
Daria Obydennova
Referee:
(Germany) Katja Bandlofsky
Linesmen:
(Austria) Bettina Angerer
(Denmark) Maria Raabye Fuchsel

	0–1	00:48 – L. Sviridova (M. Ryspek)
Ryu H-M. (Ri H-I.) – 34:00	1–1
	1–2	34:26 – G. Shu (L. Ibragimova, T. Koroleva)
	1–3	36:15 – Z. Tukhtieva (T. Koroleva, L. Ibragimova)
Ri H-I. (Han S-H., Kim K-B.) (PP) – 38:32	2–3
	2–4	46:48 – Z. Tukthieva (L. Ibragimova)
	2–5	54:40 – M. Ryspek (M. Sviridova)
	2–6	57:18 – V. Sazonova (Z. Tukhieva, T.Koroleva)

6 min
Penalties
12 min
13
Shots
23

7 April 2013; 19:30	Netherlands	2–4 (0–0, 0–1, 2–3)	France	Patinoire Iceberg, Strasbourg; Attendance: 807

Game reference

Claudia van Leeuwen
Goalies
Jeanne Morin
Referee:
(Czech Republic) Drahomira Fialová
Linesmen:
(Slovakia) Magdalena Čerhitová
(Japan) Tomomi Narusawa

	0–1	22:30 – L. Baudrit (V. Bouetz Andrieu)
J. Zwarthoed (M. de Jong, S. Wielenga) (PP) – 40:43	1–1
	1–2	43:54 – E. Passard (M. Allemoz, S. Leclerc) (PP)
	1–3	47:50 – B. Jouanny (G. Gendarme, E. Passard) (PP)
S. Wielenga (PP) – 50:27	2–3
	2–4	58:28 – M. Allemoz (L. Baudrit, D. Gicquel)

14 min
Penalties
14 min
17
Shots
45

8 April 2013; 12:30	Kazakhstan	4–3 GWS (1–0, 2–1, 0–2) (OT 0–0) (SO: 1–0)	Great Britain	Patinoire Iceberg, Strasbourg; Attendance: 292

Game reference

Daria Obydennova
Goalies
Nicole Jackson
Referee:
(Canada) Gabrielle Ariano-Lortie
Linesmen:
(Austria) Bettina Angerer
(France) Anne Sophie Boniface

V. Sazonova (Z. Tukhtieva) – 09:05	1–0
A. Shegebayeva (L. Sviridova, M. Eyspek) – 33:26	2–0
V. Sazonova (L. Ibragimova, G. Shu) (PP2) – 37:33	3–0
	3–1	39:40 – A. Taylor (H. Cornford)
	3–2	45:10 – A. Taylor (PP2)
	3–3	47:02 – A. Carr (A. Taylor)

Z. Tukhtieva
G. Shu
Shootout
(miss) K. Henry
(miss) G. Farman
16 min
Penalties
8 min
26
Shots
45

8 April 2013; 16:00	China	3–4 (0–0, 2–1, 1–3)	Netherlands	Patinoire Iceberg, Strasbourg; Attendance: 150

Game reference

Jia Dandan
Goalies
Claudia van Leeuwen
Referee:
(Russia) Arina Ustinova
Linesmen:
(Slovakia) Magdalena Čerhitová
(France) Sueva Torribio Rousselin

Zhang M. (Zhang B.) (SH) – 20:40	1–0
Sun R. (Qi X.) – 25:21	2–0
	2–1	35:18 – S. Wielenga (M. de Jong, M. Martens)
	2–2	40:41 – H. Huisman
	2–3	50:11 – M. de Jong
	2–4	54:57 – M. de Jong (J. Zwarthoed)
Qi X. (Jiang N.) (EA) – 58:27	3–4

6 min
Penalties
8 min
29
Shots
18

8 April 2013; 19:30	France	5–0 (2–0, 2–0, 1–0)	North Korea	Patinoire Iceberg, Strasbourg; Attendance: 1,067

Game reference

Caroline Baldin
Goalies
Ri Hye-Yong
Referee:
(Germany) Katja Bandlofsky
Linesmen:
(Denmark) Maria Raabye Fuchsel
(Japan) Tomomi Narusawa

E. Passard – 00:52	1–0
M. Allemoz (D. Gicquel, L. Baudrit) (PP) – 10:27	2–0
E. Passard – 30:52	3–0
E. Duvin (A. Obre, M. Rihet) – 33:25	4–0
D. Gicquel (M. Allemoz, A. Locatelli) (PP) – 46:02	5–0

6 min
Penalties
14 min
31
Shots
12

10 April 2013; 12:30	Kazakhstan	2–4 (0–2, 1–0, 1–2)	Netherlands	Patinoire Iceberg, Strasbourg; Attendance: 203

Game reference

Daria Obydennova
Goalies
Claudia van Leeuwen
Referee:
(Russia) Arina Ustinova
Linesmen:
(France) Anne Sophie Boniface
(Denmark) Maria Raabye Fuchsel

	0–1	13:26 – M. de Jong (J. Zwarthoed) (PP2)
	0–2	16:35 – M. de Jong (S. Wielenga) (SH)
Z. Tukhtieva – 37:25	1–2
	1–3	49:07 – S. Wielenga
	1–4	49:43 – J. Zwarthoed (K. Hamers)
G. Shu (PP) – 52:19	2–4

10 min
Penalties
8 min
35
Shots
14

10 April 2013; 16:00	North Korea	3–2 OT (0–1, 1–1, 1–0) (OT 1–0)	Great Britain	Patinoire Iceberg, Strasbourg; Attendance: 204

Game reference

Ri Hye-Yong
Goalies
Nicole Jackson
Referee:
(Czech Republic) Drahomira Fialová
Linesmen:
(France) Sueva Torribio Rousselin
(Denmark) Trine Viskum

	0–1	14:42 – B. Kavanagh (A. Taylor, G. Farman) (PP)
	0–2	20:28 – B. Kavanagh (G. Farman) (PP)
Ro S-B. (Jin O.) – 25:19	1–2
Ro S-B. (Kim S-Y.) (PP) – 54:09	2–2
Ryu H-M. (O C-O., Won C-S.) – 61:59	3–2

10 min
Penalties
14 min
32
Shots
34

10 April 2013; 19:30	China	1–5 (0–2, 0–1, 1–2)	France	Patinoire Iceberg, Strasbourg; Attendance: 1,515

Game reference

Jia Dandan
Wang Yuquin
Goalies
Caroline Baldin
Referee:
(Canada) Gabrielle Ariano-Lortie
Linesmen:
(Austria) Bettina Angerer
(Slovakia) Magdalena Čerhitová

	0–1	06:44 – M. Allemoz (V. Bouetz Andrieu) (PP)
	0–2	12:15 – D. Gicquel (L. Baudrit, M. Allemoz)
	0–3	31:49 – A. Bouche (B. Jouanny, E. Passard) (PP2)
	0–4	44:50 – A. Locatelli (G. Gendarme, E. Passard) (PP2)
	0–5	48:42 – L. Parment (A. Locatelli, M. Allemoz) (PP)
Sun R. (Wang C.) (PP, EA) – 59:54	1–5

38 min
Penalties
16 min
17
Shots
42

12 April 2013; 12:30	China	1–5 (0–2, 1–2, 0–1)	North Korea	Patinoire Iceberg, Strasbourg; Attendance: 448

Game reference

Jia Dandan
Goalies
Hye Yong
Referee:
(Germany) Katja Bandlofsky
Linesmen:
(Slovakia) Magdalena Čerhitová
(Japan) Tomomi Narusawa

	0–1	06:48 – Ri H-I. (PP)
	0–2	08:43 – O C-O. (Han S-H., Kim K-B.
	0–3	26:59 – O. C-O. (Han S-H., Ryu H-M.)
	0–4	33:45 – Han S-H. (Ryu H-M.)
Fang X. (Wen L.) – 34:41	1–4
	1–5	58:28 – Kim S-Y. (Won C-S., Jin O.)

10 min
Penalties
4 min
22
Shots
37

12 April 2013; 16:00	Great Britain	1–3 (1–1, 0–1, 0–1)	Netherlands	Patinoire Iceberg, Strasbourg; Attendance: 230

Game reference

Nicole Jackson
Goalies
Claudia van Leeuwen
Referee:
(Canada) Gabrielle Ariano-Lortie
Linesmen:
(Austria) Bettina Angerer
(France) Sueva Torribio Rousselin

A. Taylor (A. Carr) – 00:18	1–0
	1–1	01:45 – S. Wielenga (SH)
	1–2	39:29 – S. Wielenga (M. de Jong)
	1–3	42:01 – G. Barton (J. Schipper)

10 min
Penalties
22 min
48
Shots
21

12 April 2013; 19:30	France	3–0 (0–0, 1–0, 2–0)	Kazakhstan	Patinoire Iceberg, Strasbourg; Attendance: 1,516

Game reference

Caroline Baldin
Goalies
Daria Obydennova
Referee:
(Czech Republic) Drahomira Fialová
Linesmen:
(Denmark) Maria Raabye Fuchsel
(Denmark) Trine Viskum

D. Gicquel (M. Allemoz, L. Baudrit) – 22:12	1–0
L. Baudrit (M. Allemoz) – 49:39	2–0
E. Passard (B. Jouanny) – 59:24	3–0

12 min
Penalties
6 min
33
Shots
12

13 April 2013; 12:30	Netherlands	3–2 GWS (0–1, 2–0, 0–1) (OT 0–0) (SO: 1–0)	North Korea	Patinoire Iceberg, Strasbourg; Attendance: 140

Game reference

Claudia van Leeuwen
Goalies
Ri Hye-Yong
Referee:
(Russia) Arina Ustinova
Linesmen:
(France) Sueva Torribio Rousselin
(Denmark) Trine Viskum

	0–1	17:54 – O C-O. (Kim K-B.) (PP2)
Z. Barbier (J. Tegelaar) (PP) – 30:15	1–1
M. de Jong (S. Wielenga) – 36:38	2–1
	2–2	48:31 – Kim K-B. (PP)

M. de Jong (miss)
S. Wielenga (miss)
B. van Nes (miss)
M. de Jong (miss)
S. Wielenga (miss)
M. de Jong
Shootout
(miss) Ryu H-M.
(miss) Kim K-B.
(miss) O C-O.
(miss) Ryu H-M.
(miss) Kim S-Y.
(miss) Won C-S.
26 min
Penalties
18 min
19
Shots
33

13 April 2013; 16:00	Kazakhstan	0–4 (0–1, 0–2, 0–1)	China	Patinoire Iceberg, Strasbourg; Attendance: 218

Game reference

Daria Obydennova
Tatyana Mozhayeva
Goalies
Jia Dandan
Referee:
(Czech Republic) Drahomira Fialová
Linesmen:
(France) Anne Sophie Boniface
(Slovakia) Magdalena Čerhitová

0–1	11:19 – Wen L. (Liu Z.)
0–2	31:16 – Sun R. (Zhang M.)
0–3	37:35 – Sun R. (Zhang M., Kong M.)
0–4	53:26 – Zhang M. (Sun R., Kong M.)

6 min
Penalties
8 min
21
Shots
35

13 April 2013; 19:30	France	6–1 (2–1, 2–0, 2–0)	Great Britain	Patinoire Iceberg, Strasbourg; Attendance: 1,592

Game reference

Caroline Baldin
Goalies
Chelsea Mackenzie
Referee:
(Canada) Gabrielle Ariano-Lortie
Linesmen:
(Austria) Bettina Angerer
(Japan) Tomomi Narusawa

S. Fohrer – 01:14	1–0
A. Bouche (E. Passard) (PP) – 05:31	2–0
	2–1	05:55 – N. Aldridge
L. Baudrit (A. Bouche, D. Gicquel) – 29:21	3–1
E. Passard (A. Locatelli) (SH) – 35:17	4–1
L. Baudrit (M. Allemoz, D. Gicquel) – 52:13	5–1
A. Bouche (G. Gendarme) – 56:08	6–1

24 min
Penalties
26 min
30
Shots
15

=== Statistics and awards ===
==== Scoring leaders ====
Pos	Player	Country	GP	G	A	Pts	+/−	PIM
1	Marion Allemoz	France	5	3	7	10	+6	4
2	Mieneke de Jong	Netherlands	5	6	3	9	+6	14
3	Savine Wielenga	Netherlands	5	5	4	9	+4	2
4	Emmanuelle Passard	France	5	5	3	8	+4	2
5	Lore Baudrit	France	5	4	4	8	+7	10
6	Sun Rui	China	5	6	1	7	+2	4
7	Zhang Mengying	China	5	5	2	7	+3	0
8	Driane Gicquel	France	5	3	4	7	+7	2
9	Zarina Tukhtieva	Kazakhstan	5	4	2	6	0	4
10	Anouck Bouche	France	5	3	2	5	+3	4
10	Ryu Hyon-mi	China	5	3	2	5	+2	4
10	Angela Taylor	Great Britain	5	3	2	5	–2	16

GP = Games played; G = Goals; A = Assists; Pts = Points; +/− = Plus–minus; PIM = Penalties In Minutes
Source: IIHF.com

==== Goaltending leaders ====
(minimum 40% team's total ice time)

Pos	Player	Country	TOI	GA	GAA	Sv%	SO
1	Caroline Baldin	France	180:00	1	0.33	97.56	2
2	Claudia van Leeuwen	Netherlands	305:00	12	2.36	93.68	0
3	Jeanne Morin	France	120:00	3	1.50	90.62	0
4	Jia Dandan	China	292:05	15	3.08	89.36	1
5	Daria Obydennova	Kazakhstan	290:53	15	3.09	88.37	0

TOI = Time on ice (minutes:seconds); GA = Goals against; GAA = Goals against average; Sv% = Save percentage; SO = Shutouts
Source: IIHF.com

==== Directorate Awards ====
- Goaltender: Claudia van Leeuwen, Netherlands
- Defenseman: Athena Locatelli, France
- Forward: Marion Allemoz, France

Source: IIHF.com
