= 2014 IIHF Women's World Championship Division I =

International ice hockey competition

Tournament details
- Host countries: Czech Republic; Latvia
- Venues: 2 (in 2 host cities)
- Dates: 6–12 April 2014
- Teams: 12

The 2014 IIHF Women's World Championship Division I consisted of two international ice hockey tournaments organized by the International Ice Hockey Federation. Division I A and Division I B represent the second and third tier of the IIHF Women's World Championship.

== Division I Group A ==
2014 IIHF Women's World Championship Division I A
Tournament details
- Host country: Czech Republic
- City: Přerov
- Venue: 1 (in 1 host city)
- Dates: 6–12 April 2014
- Teams: 6

Tournament statistics
- Games played: 15
- Goals scored: 88 (5.87 per game)
- Attendance: 10,390 (693 per game)

The Division I Group A tournament was played in Přerov, Czech Republic, from 6 to 12 April 2014.

The winners of this tournament advanced to the Top Division playoff for the 2015 Championship against the last team of the 2014 Winter Olympics tournament, Japan.

The last-placed team of the Division I Group A were relegated to the 2015 Division I Group B.

=== Participating teams ===
Team	Qualification
Czech Republic	hosts; placed 8th in Top Division last year and were relegated
Denmark	placed 2nd in Division I A last year
Slovakia	placed 3rd in Division I A last year
Austria	placed 4th in Division I A last year
Norway	placed 5th in Division I A last year
France	placed 1st in Division I B last year and were promoted

=== Final standings ===
Pos	Team	Pld	W	OTW	OTL	L	GF	GA	GD	Pts	Qualification or relegation
1	Czech Republic (H)	5	5	0	0	0	15	3	+12	15	Qualified for the 2015 Top Division playoff
2	Norway	5	3	0	0	2	17	12	+5	9	
3	Denmark	5	2	1	0	2	17	18	−1	8	
4	France	5	2	0	0	3	12	15	−3	6	
5	Austria	5	1	1	1	2	16	19	−3	6	
6	Slovakia	5	0	0	1	4	11	21	−10	1	Relegated to the 2015 Division I B

Source: IIHF
(H) Host

=== Match results ===
All times are local (Central European Summer Time – UTC+2).

6 April 2014; 13:00	France	0–3 (0–0, 0–1, 0–2)	Czech Republic	Zimní stadion, Přerov; Attendance: 1,357

Game reference

Caroline Baldin
Goalies
Klára Peslarová
Referee:
(Netherlands) Debby Hengst
Linesmen:
(Germany) Lisa Huffner
(Netherlands) Bianca Schipper

0–1	39:09 – A. Tejralová (A. Polenská, S. Studentová) (PP)
0–2	41:55 – V. Přibylová (K. Flachsová, T. Vanišová)
0–3	47:47 – D. Lásková (A. Polenská, S. Studentová)

14 min
Penalties
4 min
20
Shots
45

6 April 2014; 16:30	Norway	6–3 (2–0, 2–1, 2–2)	Slovakia	Zimní stadion, Přerov; Attendance: 216

Game reference

Toini Veronica Nilsen
Goalies
Jana Budajová
Referee:
(Canada) Gabrielle Ariano-Lortie
Linesmen:
(Japan) Chieko Inoue
(Finland) Jenni Visala

M. Haug-Hansen (I. Morset) (PP) – 05:22	1–0
I. Farstad (S. Holos) – 14:59	2–0
A. Dalen (S. Holos, I. Farstad) – 20:42	3–0
I. Farstad (M. Fischer, M. Gunther) (PP) – 24:28	4–0
	4–1	29:33 – M. Mikesková (M. Veličková) (PP)
	4–2	49:05 – L. Sroková (N. Gápová, B. Kežmarská) (PP)
H. Sletbak (M. Henriksen, M. Haug-Hansen) – 53:22	5–2
	5–3	57:51 – V. Ihnaťová
. Dalen (M. Fischer) – 58:29	6–3

16 min
Penalties
12 min
46
Shots
28

6 April 2014; 20:00	Austria	4–5 OT (1–0, 1–0, 2–4) (OT 0–1)	Denmark	Zimní stadion, Přerov; Attendance: 153

Game reference

Paula Marchhart
Goalies
Amalie Joa
Referee:
(Japan) Kyoko Ugajin
Linesmen:
(Czech Republic) Gabriela Malá
(Czech Republic) Gabriela Stastna

E. Beiter (C. Wittich) – 08:50	1–0
A. Meixner (D. Altmann, E. Kantor) – 25:37	2–0
	2–1	41:37 – J. Persson (J. Gregersen)
	2–2	47:33 – J. Persson
V. Hummel – 48:03	3–2
	3–3	48:58 – J. Persson
A. Meixner – 53:03	4–3
	4–4	59:30 – M. Frandsen (J. Asperup) (EA)
	4–5	63:57 – J. Persson

8 min
Penalties
10 min
30
Shots
39

7 April 2014; 13:00	Slovakia	1–3 (1–0, 0–2, 0–1)	France	Zimní stadion, Přerov; Attendance: 177

Game reference

Jana Budajová
Romana Kiapešová
Goalies
Caroline Baldin
Referee:
(United States) Jerilyn Glenn
Linesmen:
(Germany) Lisa Huffner
(Czech Republic) Gabriela Malá

M. Herichová (P. Jurčová) – 03:44	1–0
	1–1	22:20 – S. Fohrer (E. Passard) (PP)
	1–2	25:29 – L. Parment (E. Duvin) (PP)
	1–3	59:54 – M. Allemoz (ENG)

16 min
Penalties
20 min
30
Shots
28

7 April 2014; 16:30	Denmark	1–5 (0–3, 0–1, 1–1)	Norway	Zimní stadion, Přerov; Attendance: 164

Game reference

Amalie Joa
Goalies
Toini Veronica Nilsen
Referee:
(Netherlands) Debby Hengst
Linesmen:
(Netherlands) Bianca Schipper
(Czech Republic) Gabriela Stastna

	0–1	05:55 – M. Haug-Hansen (S. Holos)
	0–2	08:52 – A. Dalen (M. Fischer, R. Tautra)
	0–3	10:10 – H. Sletbak (M. Haug-Hansen)
	0–4	33:43 – M. Gunther (H. Sletbak, M. Henriksen) (PP)
M. Olausson (M. Henriksen) – 45:16	1–4
	1–5	57:28 – A. Dalen (I. Farstad) (SH)

8 min
Penalties
10 min
28
Shots
26

7 April 2014; 20:00	Czech Republic	2–1 (0–0, 1–0, 1–1)	Austria	Zimní stadion, Přerov; Attendance: 1,524

Game reference

Klára Peslarová
Goalies
Paula Marchhart
Referee:
(Canada) Gabrielle Ariano-Lortie
Linesmen:
(Japan) Chieko Inoue
(Canada) Vanessa Stratton

A. Lédlová (D. Lásková) (PP) – 21:54	1–0
	1–1	47:30 – E. Kantor
A. Polenská (D. Lásková, A. Tejralová) (PP) – 56:44	2–1

16 min
Penalties
18 min
38
Shots
25

9 April 2014; 13:00	France	7–2 (1–1, 3–0, 3–1)	Austria	Zimní stadion, Přerov; Attendance: 150

Game reference

Caroline Baldin
Goalies
Paula Marchart
Theresa Hornich
Referee:
(Japan) Kyoko Ugajin
Linesmen:
(Netherlands) Bianca Schipper-Poeteray
(Czech Republic) Gabriela Stastna

	0–1	04:58 – J. Weber (J. Kainberger)
L. Parment (V. Bouetz) (PP) – 15:40	1–1
E. Passard (L. Parment) (PP) – 26:03	2–1
M. Allemoz (E. Duvin) (PP2) – 30:08	3–1
J. Vix (E. Duvin) – 33:43	4–1
L. Escudero (B. Jouanny) – 45:41	5–1
L. Baudrit (M. Rihet) – 50:08	6–1
	6–2	55:34 – A. Meixner (D. Altmann) (PP)
A. Locatelli (E. Passard, G. Gendarme) (PP) – 59:52	7–2

10 min
Penalties
12 min
33
Shots
29

9 April 2014; 16:30	Denmark	5–3 (4–0, 1–3, 0–0)	Slovakia	Zimní stadion, Přerov; Attendance: 231

Game reference

Lisa Jensen
Goalies
Romana Kiapešová
Jana Budajová
Referee:
(Canada) Gabrielle Ariano-Lortie
Linesmen:
(Japan) Chieko Inoue
(Czech Republic) Gabriela Malá

J. Persson – 03:54	1–0
J. Asperup (J. Jakobsen) – 07:37	2–0
M. Frandsen (J. Gregersen) (PP) – 10:39	3–0
M. Weis (M. Henriksen, J. Jakobsen) – 19:29	4–0
M. Weis (M. Henriksen) (PP2) – 56:04	5–0
	5–1	27:43 – M. Veličková (M. Mikesková) (SH)
	5–2	28:07 – P. Jurčová (L. Sroková)
	5–3	32:13 – P. Jurčová (M. Veličková)

22 min
Penalties
18 min
32
Shots
23

9 April 2014; 20:00	Czech Republic	2–0 (1–0, 1–0, 0–0)	Norway	Zimní stadion, Přerov; Attendance: 1,754

Game reference
Klára Peslarová	Goalies	Toini Nilsen	Referee: (United States) Jerilyn Glenn; Linesmen: (Canada) Vanessa Stratton (Finland) Jenni Visala
S. Studentová (E. Holešová, A. Polenská) – 16:14 / 1–0; D. Křížová (K. Mrázová) – 30:01 / 2–0			Referee: (United States) Jerilyn Glenn; Linesmen: (Canada) Vanessa Stratton (Finland) Jenni Visala
14 min	Penalties	20 min	Referee: (United States) Jerilyn Glenn; Linesmen: (Canada) Vanessa Stratton (Finland) Jenni Visala
24	Shots	15	Referee: (United States) Jerilyn Glenn; Linesmen: (Canada) Vanessa Stratton (Finland) Jenni Visala

10 April 2014; 13:00	Denmark	5–1 (1–0, 1–0, 3–1)	France	Zimní stadion, Přerov; Attendance: 148

Game reference

Lisa Jensen
Goalies
Caroline Baldin
Referee:
(United States) Jerilyn Glenn
Linesmen:
(Canada) Vanessa Stratton
(Finland) Jenni Visala

E. Russell (J. Asperup) – 02:02	1–0
J. Jakobsen (M. Weis) – 22:18	2–0
	2–1	49:20 – M. Allemoz (L. Escudero)
J. Jakobsen – 51:34	3–1
M. Weis (J. Jakobsen, M. Henriksen) (PP) – 58:19	4–1
M. Olausson (J. Jakobsen) (PP) – 59:35	5–1

26 min
Penalties
12 min
31
Shots
25

10 April 2014; 16:30	Austria	5–2 (0–0, 3–2, 2–0)	Norway	Zimní stadion, Přerov; Attendance: 175

Game reference

Paula Marchhart
Goalies
Toini Nielsen
Referee:
(Netherlands) Debby Hengst
Linesmen:
(Japan) Chieko Inoue
(Czech Republic) Gabriela Malá

	0–1	22:43 – A. Dalen (S. Holos, I. Farstad)
E. Beiter (D. Altmann) (SH) – 27:06	1–1
E. Beiter (D. Altmann, C. Wittich) (PP) – 29:55	2–1
	2–2	32:29 – M. Fischer (V. Lovdal, I. Farstad) (PP)
V. Hummel (J. Weber) – 36:34	3–2
D. Altmann (E. Beiter) – 45:22	4–2
V. Hummel (T. Grascher) – 46:27	5–2

12 min
Penalties
4 min
33
Shots
29

10 April 2014; 20:00	Slovakia	1–3 (0–1, 1–0, 0–2)	Czech Republic	Zimní stadion, Přerov; Attendance: 2,041

Game reference

Jana Budajová
Goalies
Klára Peslarová
Referee:
(Japan) Kyoko Ugajin
Linesmen:
(Germany) Lisa Huffner
(Netherlands) Bianca Schipper-Poeteray

	0–1	03:54 – S. Studentová (E. Holešová)
L. Sroková (D. Lalíková) (PP) – 33:04	1–1
	1–2	40:10 – V. Přibylová (D. Křížová)
	1–3	57:21 – A. Polenská (S. Studentová, D. Lásková) (PP)

10 min
Penalties
10 min
19
Shots
44

12 April 2014; 13:00	Slovakia	3–4 GWS (1–1, 2–0, 0–2) (OT 0–0) (SO: 0–1)	Austria	Zimní stadion, Přerov; Attendance: 149

Game reference

Jana Budajová
Goalies
Paula Marchhart
Referee:
(United States) Jerilyn Glenn
Linesmen:
(Japan) Chieko Inoue
(Finland) Jenni Visala

N. Gápová (L. Lúčová) – 04:19	1–0
	1–1	17:23 – E. Beiter (D. Altmann, A. Schneider)
V. Ihnaťová (L. Sroková) – 25:08	2–1
M. Mikesková (D. Lalíková) (PP) – 26:06	3–1
	3–2	45:47 – A. Meixner (D. Altmann)
	3–3	59:28 – M. Brunner (D. Altmann) (EA)

P. Jurčová (miss)
M. Mikesková (miss)
L. Sroková (miss)
V. Ihnaťová (miss)
N. Gápová (miss)
Shootout
(miss) E. Beiter
(miss) A. Meixner
(miss) D. Altmann
(miss) J. Weber
E. Beiter
22 min
Penalties
6 min
24
Shots
48

12 April 2014; 16:30	Norway	4–1 (1–1, 2–0, 1–0)	France	Zimní stadion, Přerov; Attendance: 137

Game reference

Toini Nilsen
Goalies
Caroline Baldin
Referee:
(Japan) Kyoko Ugajin
Linesmen:
(Germany) Lisa Huffner
(Czech Republic) Gabriela Stastna

I. Farstad (M. Henriksen) (PP) – 03:00	1–0
	1–1	17:12 – M. Allemoz (L. Baudrit) (PP2, EA)
A. Dalen (I. Farstad, I. Morset) (PP2) – 23:54	2–1
M. Fischer (M. Haug-Hansen) (PP) – 25:12	3–1
A. Dalen (SH, ENG) – 59:56	4–1

16 min
Penalties
10 min
21
Shots
48

12 April 2014; 20:00	Czech Republic	5–1 (0–0, 0–1, 5–0)	Denmark	Zimní stadion, Přerov; Attendance: 2,014

Game reference

Radka Lhotská
Goalies
Lisa Jensen
Referee:
(Canada) Gabrielle Ariano-Lortie
Linesmen:
(Netherlands) Bianca Schipper-Poeteray
(Canada) Vanessa Stratton

	0–1	32:06 – M. Weis (C. Densing, J. Jakobsen) (PP)
A. Polenská – 41:19	1–1
K. Mrázová (K. Kaplanová, D. Křížová) (PP) – 45:34	2–1
D. Křížová (S. Studentová, K. Mrázová) (PP) – 49:28	3–1
A. Polenská (SH) – 41:56	4–1
P. Horálková (K. Bukolská) – 57:41	5–1

8 min
Penalties
14 min
32
Shots
15

=== Awards and statistics ===
==== Awards ====
- Best players selected by the directorate:
  - Best Goalkeeper: (Czech Republic) Klára Peslarová
  - Best Defenseman: (Norway) Silje Holos
  - Best Forward: (Norway) Andrea Schjelderup Dalen

Source: IIHF.com

==== Scoring leaders ====
List shows the top skaters sorted by points, then goals.

Player	GP	G	A	Pts	+/−	PIM	POS
(Norway) Ingvild Farstad	5	2	6	8	+4	8	F
(Austria) Denise Altmann	5	1	7	8	+2	4	F
(Norway) Andrea Schjelderup Dalen	5	7	0	7	+5	6	F
(Czech Republic) Alena Polenská	5	4	3	7	+5	4	F
(Denmark) Josefine Jakobsen	5	2	5	7	0	4	F
(Austria) Eva Beiter	5	5	1	6	+3	4	F
(Czech Republic) Simona Studentová	5	2	4	6	+4	2	F
(Denmark) Josefine Persson	5	5	0	5	+1	4	F
(Denmark) Michelle Weis	5	4	1	5	−3	12	F
(Norway) Mathea Fischer	5	2	3	5	+2	0	F
(Norway) Madelen Haug-Hansen	5	2	3	5	+3	4	F

GP = Games played; G = Goals; A = Assists; Pts = Points; +/− = Plus/minus; PIM = Penalties in minutes; POS = Position
Source: IIHF.com

==== Leading goaltenders ====
Only the top five goaltenders, based on save percentage, who have played at least 40% of their team's minutes, are included in this list.

Player	TOI	GA	GAA	SA	Sv%	SO
(Czech Republic) Klára Peslarová	240:00	2	0.50	79	97.47	2
(Norway) Toini Nilsen	300:00	12	2.40	161	92.55	0
(France) Caroline Baldin	298:46	14	2.81	155	90.97	0
(Slovakia) Jana Budajová	259:50	17	3.93	173	90.17	0
(Austria) Paula Marchhart	291:54	17	3.49	159	89.31	0

TOI = Time on Ice (minutes:seconds); SA = Shots against; GA = Goals against; GAA = Goals against average; Sv% = Save percentage; SO = Shutouts
Source: IIHF.com

== Division I Group B ==
2014 IIHF Women's World Championship Division I B
Tournament details
- Host country: Latvia
- City: Ventspils
- Venue: 1 (in 1 host city)
- Dates: 6–12 April 2014
- Teams: 6

Tournament statistics
- Games played: 15
- Goals scored: 71 (4.73 per game)
- Attendance: 4,750 (317 per game)

The Division I Group B tournament was played in Ventspils, Latvia, from 6 to 12 April 2014.

The winners of this tournament were promoted to Group A, while the last-placed team were relegated to the Division II Group A for 2015.

=== Participating teams ===
Team	Qualification
Latvia	hosts; placed 6th in Division I A last year and were relegated
Netherlands	placed 2nd in Division I B last year
North Korea	placed 3rd in Division I B last year
China	placed 4th in Division I B last year
Kazakhstan	placed 5th in Division I B last year
Hungary	placed 1st in Division II A last year and were promoted

=== Final standings ===
Pos	Team	Pld	W	OTW	OTL	L	GF	GA	GD	Pts	Promotion or relegation
1	Latvia (H)	5	5	0	0	0	17	3	+14	15	Promoted to the 2015 Division I A
2	China	5	3	0	0	2	10	15	−5	9	
3	Hungary	5	2	1	0	2	13	13	0	8	
4	Netherlands	5	2	1	0	2	16	10	+6	8	
5	North Korea	5	1	0	0	4	10	17	−7	3	
6	Kazakhstan	5	0	0	2	3	5	13	−8	2	Relegated to the 2015 Division II A

Source: IIHF
(H) Host

=== Match results ===
All times are local (Eastern European Summer Time – UTC+3).

6 April 2014; 13:00	Kazakhstan	0–3 (0–1, 0–1, 0–1)	North Korea	Olympic Center Ice Hall, Ventspils; Attendance: 115

Game reference

Aizhan Raushanova
Goalies
Ri Hye-yong
Referee:
(Germany) Katja Bandlofsky
Linesmen:
(Japan) Hitomi Igarashi
(Germany) Natalie Mauelshagen

0–1	12:04 – O C-o. (Han S-h., Kim K-b.)
0–2	27:18 – O C-O. (Ryu H-m., Kim K-b.)
0–3	54:50 – Kim H-m. (O C-o., Ryu H-m.) (PP2)

12 min
Penalties
8 min
34
Shots
33

6 April 2014; 16:30	China	2–8 (0–2, 2–2, 0–4)	Netherlands	Olympic Center Ice Hall, Ventspils; Attendance: 110

Game reference

Wang Yuqing
Yang Jiaqi
Goalies
Claudia van Leeuwen
Referee:
(United States) Melissa Szkola
Linesmen:
(Latvia) Sintija Greiere
(Russia) Olga Steinberg

	0–1	07:45 – S. Wielenga (SH)
	0–2	18:38 – Z. Barbier (K. Hamers)
He X. (Fang X.) – 23:38	1–2
Kong M. (Liu Z., Zhang M.) – 24:56	2–2
	2–3	28:42 – S. Wielenga (B. van Nes, J. Schipper) (PP)
	2–4	29:17 – E. Even (G. Barton)
	2–5	49:35 – J. Tegelaar (S. Wielenga, K. Hamers)
	2–6	51:58 – C. Keijzer (S. Wielenga, Z. Barbier)
	2–7	56:51 – Z. Barbier (J. Tegelaar, H. Huisman)
	2–8	57:21 – N. Tjin-A-Ton (M. de Jong)

8 min
Penalties
6 min
21
Shots
41

6 April 2014; 20:00	Hungary	0–4 (0–1, 0–2, 0–1)	Latvia	Olympic Center Ice Hall, Ventspils; Attendance: 510

Game reference

Anikó Németh
Goalies
Evija Tētiņa
Referee:
(Czech Republic) Radka Růžičková
Linesmen:
(Slovenia) Nataša Pagon
(Finland) Johanna Taurianen

0–1	19:38 – L. Miljone (Z. Vasiļevska)
0–2	30:35 – I. Geca-Miljone (L. Miljone, L. Dekmeijere-Trigubova)
0–3	37:27 – A. Kubliņa (S. Ozmena)
0–4	46:46 – I. Geca-Miljone (A. K. Lagzdiņa)

8 min
Penalties
10 min
31
Shots
35

7 April 2014; 13:00	Netherlands	3–2 OT (1–1, 1–1, 0–0) (OT 1–0)	Kazakhstan	Olympic Center Ice Hall, Ventspils; Attendance: 102

Game reference

Claudia van Leeuwen
Goalies
Aizhan Raushanova
Referee:
(Russia) Yana Zueva
Linesmen:
(Japan) Hitomi Igarashi
(Slovenia) Nataša Pagon

J. Zwarthoed (S. Wielenga, M. de Jong) – 02:57	1–0
	1–1	14:03 – Z. Tukhtieva (PP)
	1–2	32:59 – Z. Tukhtieva (L. Ibragimova)
M. de Jong (J. Zwarthoed) – 35:3	2–2
M. de Jong (J. Zwarthoed, K. Hamers) (PP) – 62:22	3–2

12 min
Penalties
12 min
39
Shots
36

7 April 2014; 16:30	North Korea	4–8 (0–2, 3–3, 1–3)	Hungary	Olympic Center Ice Hall, Ventspils; Attendance: 72

Game reference

Ri Hye-yong
So Jong-sim
Goalies
Anikó Németh
Referee:
(Czech Republic) Radka Růžičková
Linesmen:
(Latvia) Sintija Greiere
(Finland) Johanna Taurianen

	0–1	05:00 – T. Horváth
	0–2	11:04 – T. Horváth (D. Medgyes)
	0–3	21:48 – A. Kiss (L. Pintér, T. Horváth)
O C-o. (PP) – 23:01	1–3
	1–4	24:02 – V. Somogyi (A. Rónai)
	1–5	26:51 – R. Ungár (D. Medgyes)
O C-o. (Kim H-m.) – 26:59	2–5
Kim S-y. (PS) – 28:28	3–5
	3–6	42:05 – R. Ungár (D. Medgyes)
Ryu H-m. (PP) – 47:59	4–6
	4–7	53:50 – T. Horváth (A. Kiss) (PP)
	4–8	54:36 – L. Pintér (A. Kiss)

10 min
Penalties
14 min
24
Shots
31

7 April 2014; 20:00	Latvia	5–1 (1–0, 2–0, 2–1)	China	Olympic Center Ice Hall, Ventspils; Attendance: 634

Game reference

Evija Tētiņa
Goalies
Wang Yuqing
Referee:
(Germany) Katja Bandlofsky
Linesmen:
(Russia) Olga Steinberg
(Slovakia) Jana Zvadová

L. Miljone (I. Geca-Miljone, S. Žebere) (PP) – 13:08	1–0
I. Geca-Miljone (L. Miljone) – 25:39	2–0
L. Miljone (I. Geca-Miljone, S. Ozmena) (PP2) – 27:48	3–0
	3–1	48:31 – Fang X. (Kong M., Yu B.)
Z. Vasiļevska (L. Dekmeijere-Trigubova, S. Zebrere) – 52:57	4–1
L. Dekmeijere-Trigubova (L. Miljone, I. Geca-Miljone) – 56:26	5–1

6 min
Penalties
20 min
47
Shots
22

9 April 2014; 13:00	Hungary	1–3 (1–0, 0–2, 0–1)	China	Olympic Center Ice Hall, Ventspils; Attendance: 83

Game reference

Anikó Németh
Goalies
Wang Yuqing
Referee:
(Russia) Yana Zueva
Linesmen:
(Latvia) Sintija Greiere
(Japan) Hitomi Igarashi

F. Kiss-Simon (D. Medgyes, T. Horváth) (PP2) – 19:16	1–0
	1–1	32:16 – Wen L. (Yu B., Liu Z.) (PP)
	1–2	39:18 – Wen L.
	1–3	52:35 – Zhu R. (He X.)

6 min
Penalties
16 min
39
Shots
19

9 April 2014; 16:30	Netherlands	4–2 (0–2, 2–0, 2–0)	North Korea	Olympic Center Ice Hall, Ventspils; Attendance: 138

Game reference

Claudia van Leeuwen
Goalies
Ri Hye-yong
Referee:
(Czech Republic) Radka Růžičková
Linesmen:
(Germany) Natalie Mauelshagen
(Slovakia) Jana Zvadová

	0–1	07:08 – Han S-h. (O C-o.) (PP)
	0–2	11:25 – Won C-s.
S. Wielenga (C. Keijzer) – 24:41	1–2
E. Even – 38:02	2–2
K. Hamers (B. van Nes) – 44:24	3–2
E. Even (B. van Nes) – 49:21	4–2

16 min
Penalties
14 min
27
Shots
27

9 April 2014; 20:00	Latvia	3–1 (1–0, 0–1, 2–0)	Kazakhstan	Olympic Center Ice Hall, Ventspils; Attendance: 817

Game reference

Evija Tētiņa
Goalies
Aizhan Raushanova
Referee:
(United States) Melissa Szkola
Linesmen:
(Russia) Olga Steinberg
(Finland) Johanna Taurianen

A. Lagzdina (I. Geca-Miljone, Z. Vasiļevska) (PP) – 16:23	1–0
	1–1	32:44 – Z. Tukhtieva (SH)
L. Dekmeijere-Trigubova (I. Geca-Miljone) (PP) – 40:33	2–1
L. Dekmeijere-Trigubova (I. Koka, I. Geca-Miljone) (PP2) – 57:05	3–1

10 min
Penalties
12 min
30
Shots
38

10 April 2014; 13:00	Netherlands	1–2 (0–1, 0–0, 1–1)	Hungary	Olympic Center Ice Hall, Ventspils; Attendance: 92

Game reference

Claudia van Leeuwen
Goalies
Anikó Németh
Referee:
(United States) Melissa Szkola
Linesmen:
(Germany) Natalie Mauelshagen
(Slovakia) Jana Zvadová

	0–1	01:16 – B. Németh (R. Ungár)
S. Wielenga (K. Hamers) (PP) – 54:40	1–1
	1–2	58:38 – R. Dabasi (B. Németh, G. Szlaby) (PP)

8 min
Penalties
6 min
21
Shots
36

10 April 2014; 16:30	China	2–1 (2–0, 0–0, 0–1)	Kazakhstan	Olympic Center Ice Hall, Ventspils; Attendance: 76

Game reference

Wang Yuqing
Goalies
Aizhan Raushanova
Referee:
(Germany) Katja Bandlofsky
Linesmen:
(Latvia) Sintija Greiere
(Slovenia) Nataša Pagon

Lu S. (He X., Wen L.) – 02:50	1–0
He X. (Wen L., Jiang N.) (PP) – 13:29	2–0
	2–1	48:47 – T. Koroleva

6 min
Penalties
8 min
19
Shots
30

10 April 2014; 20:00	North Korea	1–3 (0–2, 0–1, 1–0)	Latvia	Olympic Center Ice Hall, Ventspils; Attendance: 841

Game reference

Ri Hye-yong
So Jong-sim
Goalies
Evija Tētiņa
Referee:
(Russia) Yana Zueva
Linesmen:
(Latvia) Sintija Greiere
(Finland) Johanna Taurianen

	0–1	07:52 – I. Geca-Miljone (Z. Vasiļevska, I. Koka) (PP)
	0–2	19:40 – L. Dekmeijere-Trigubova (I. Geca-Miljone) (PP2)
	0–3	24:36 – S. Ozmena (A. Kubliņa) (PP)
Ro S-b. (Han S-h.) (PP) – 51:28	1–3

18 min
Penalties
28 min
26
Shots
23

12 April 2014; 13:00	North Korea	0–2 (0–1, 0–0, 0–1)	China	Olympic Center Ice Hall, Ventspils; Attendance: 115

Game reference
Ri Hye-yong	Goalies	Wang Yuqing	Referee: (Russia) Yana Zueva; Linesmen: (Russia) Olga Steinberg (Slovakia) Jana Zvadová
0–1 / 12:56 – Lu S. (Zhao Q., He X.); 0–2 / 56:46 – Fang X.			Referee: (Russia) Yana Zueva; Linesmen: (Russia) Olga Steinberg (Slovakia) Jana Zvadová
10 min	Penalties	10 min	Referee: (Russia) Yana Zueva; Linesmen: (Russia) Olga Steinberg (Slovakia) Jana Zvadová
25	Shots	24	Referee: (Russia) Yana Zueva; Linesmen: (Russia) Olga Steinberg (Slovakia) Jana Zvadová

12 April 2014; 16:30	Kazakhstan	1–2 OT (0–0, 0–1, 1–0) (OT 0–1)	Hungary	Olympic Center Ice Hall, Ventspils; Attendance: 130

Game reference

Aizhan Raushanova
Goalies
Anikó Németh
Referee:
(Germany) Katja Bandlofsky
Linesmen:
(Latvia) Sintija Greiere
(Germany) Natalie Mauelshagen

	0–1	37:42 – R. Ungár (F. Kiss-Simon, R. Dabasi) (PP)
M. Ryspek (G. Nurgalieva) – 44:42	1–1
	1–2	61:05 – R. Ungár (R. Dabasi, B. Németh)

14 min
Penalties
12 min
25
Shots
20

12 April 2014; 20:00	Latvia	2–0 (1–0, 0–0, 1–0)	Netherlands	Olympic Center Ice Hall, Ventspils; Attendance: 915

Game reference
Evija Tētiņa	Goalies	Claudia van Leeuwen	Referee: (United States) Melissa Szkola; Linesmen: (Slovenia) Nataša Pagon (Finland) Johanna Taurianen
I. Geca-Miljone (I. Koka, L. Dekmeijere-Trigubova) – 15:31 / 1–0; I. Geca-Miljone (PP, ENG) – 59:49 / 2–0			Referee: (United States) Melissa Szkola; Linesmen: (Slovenia) Nataša Pagon (Finland) Johanna Taurianen
8 min	Penalties	22 min	Referee: (United States) Melissa Szkola; Linesmen: (Slovenia) Nataša Pagon (Finland) Johanna Taurianen
31	Shots	30	Referee: (United States) Melissa Szkola; Linesmen: (Slovenia) Nataša Pagon (Finland) Johanna Taurianen

=== Awards and statistics ===
==== Awards ====
- Best players selected by the directorate:
  - Best Goalkeeper: (Latvia) Evija Tētiņa
  - Best Defenseman: (Hungary) Dorottya Medgyes
  - Best Forward: (Latvia) Inese Geca-Miljone

Source: IIHF.com

==== Scoring leaders ====
List shows the top skaters sorted by points, then goals.

Player	GP	G	A	Pts	+/−	PIM	POS
(Latvia) Inese Geca-Miljone	5	6	7	13	+6	2	F
(Latvia) Laila Dekmeijere-Trigubova	5	4	3	7	+3	32	F
(Netherlands) Savine Wielenga	5	4	3	7	+5	2	F
(North Korea) O Chol-ok	5	4	2	6	−3	0	F
(Latvia) Līga Miljone	5	3	3	6	+5	0	F
(Hungary) Rebeka Ungár	5	4	1	5	+4	2	F
(Hungary) Tifani Horváth	5	3	2	5	+1	4	F
(China) He Xin	5	2	3	5	+1	0	F
(Netherlands) Kayleigh Hamers	5	1	4	5	+1	8	D
(Netherlands) Mieneke de Jong	5	2	2	4	+1	10	F
(China) Fang Xin	5	2	2	4	−2	4	F
(China) Wen Lu	5	2	2	4	−2	4	D

GP = Games played; G = Goals; A = Assists; Pts = Points; +/− = Plus/minus; PIM = Penalties in minutes; POS = Position
Source: IIHF.com

==== Leading goaltenders ====
Only the top five goaltenders, based on save percentage, who have played at least 40% of their team's minutes, are included in this list.

Player	TOI	GA	GAA	SA	Sv%	SO
(Latvia) Evija Tētiņa	300:00	3	0.60	147	97.96	2
(Netherlands) Claudia van Leeuwen	300:55	9	1.79	150	94.00	0
(China) Wang Yuqing	293:13	13	2.66	177	92.66	1
(Kazakhstan) Aizhan Raushanova	301:52	13	2.58	141	90.78	0
(Hungary) Anikó Németh	300:13	13	2.60	124	89.52	0

TOI = Time on Ice (minutes:seconds); SA = Shots against; GA = Goals against; GAA = Goals against average; Sv% = Save percentage; SO = Shutouts
Source: IIHF.com
