= 2019 IIHF Women's World Championship final =

Played at Espoo Metro Areena in Espoo, Finland

	1	2	3	OT	SO	Total
United States	0	1	0	0	1	2
Finland	0	1	0	0	0	1
- Date: 14 April 2019
- Arena: Metro Areena
- City: Espoo
- Attendance: 6,053

The 2019 IIHF Women's World Championship final was played on 14 April 2019, at Espoo Metro Areena in Espoo, Finland. The United States defeated Finland 2–1 in a shootout, to win its fifth consecutive and ninth overall title.

== Background ==
Since the first IIHF Women's World Championship in 1990 and the first women's tournament at the Winter Olympics in 1998, the American and Canadian national teams have played in the finals on all occasions except for the 2006 Winter Olympics, where Sweden played Canada after eliminating the United States in the semi-final.

Finland stunned Canada in the semi-finals, beating them by a score of 4–2, their first-ever semifinal victory and advanced to the gold medal game for the first time in IIHF Women's World Championship history.

== Disallowed goal controversy ==
During the final between the United States and Finland, it appeared Finland had won 2–1 after Petra Nieminen scored what appeared to be the game-winning goal in overtime. Not only would it have been Finland's first Women's World Championship, but it would've been the first time any nation had beaten both the US and Canada in the same women's hockey tournament. However, since Finnish defender Jenni Hiirikoski made contact with American goaltender Alex Rigsby just outside of the crease, the Video Goal Judge initiated a video review while the Finnish players were celebrating on the ice. The goal was reviewed for over ten minutes and eventually overturned. In a press statement released the next day, stating that despite the US goaltender propelling herself out of the crease and directly into the onrushing Finnish player, for which the goaltender was assessed a tripping penalty, the IIHF retroactively defended the decision of its video review personnel by simply citing rules 186 and 183ii – with no further elaboration – as the reasons for overturning the goal:

-According to IIHF Playing Rule 186 v. Goaltender and Goal/Goal Crease Disallowed: An attacking skater who makes contact other than incidental with a goaltender who is out of his goal crease during game action will be assessed a minor penalty for interference. If a goal is scored at this time, it will not count.

-According to IIHF Playing Rule 183 ii. Protection of a Goaltender: Incidental contact is allowed when the goaltender is in the act of playing the puck outside his goal crease, provided the attacking skater makes a reasonable effort to minimize or avoid such contact.

Neither team was able to score in the remaining minutes of overtime, with the Americans successfully killing off two power-plays. The United States went on to defeat Finland 2–1 in the shootout. (Had Nieminen's goal stood, Finland would've become the first team to beat both the US and Canada in a major women's hockey tournament.)

Finnish goaltender Noora Räty finished with 51 saves on 52 shots and Rigbsy with 26 saves on 27 shots.

=== Reactions ===
Following an initial period of uncertainty as the goal was being reviewed, the final decision to overturn the goal sparked a number of strong reactions from players, staff, and fans. Finnish NHLer Kasperi Kapanen spoke out against the decision, stating that "I think they kind of messed it up," with retired Canadian Olympian Hayley Wickenheiser agreeing, stating "That. Was. A. Goal."

Rigsby defended the decision, stating that she had immediately known the goal was illegal, and that "I was the one who got body-slammed. But the ref thinks I tried tripping the player when I was on the ground, and somehow I end up with the penalty. Funny how that went." She, however, still praised Finland, stating that "This is the best Finnish team we’ve ever seen."

== Aftermath ==
After the game, the Finnish ice hockey association announced that it would be giving the players the €7000 bonus for winning gold instead of the €5000 bonus for winning silver. Unlike the men's World Championships, however, there was no IIHF bonus for the players for winning either medal.

Finnish broadcaster Yle released viewership numbers of over 2.3 million people watching the finals on TV in Finland - more than half the country's population. The 2019 Finnish parliamentary election was held on the same day as the finals

After the finals, Finnish legend Riikka Sallinen, considered among the greatest hockey players of all time, announced her permanent retirement from the game. Finnish veterans Linda Välimäki and Venla Hovi also announced their retirements after the tournament.

== Road to the final ==
United States
Round
Finland
Opponent
Result
Preliminary round
Opponent
Result
Finland
6–2
Game 1
United States
2–6
Canada
3–2
Game 2
Russia
4–0
Switzerland
8–0
Game 3
Switzerland
6–2
Russia
10–0
Game 4
Canada
1–6
Both teams played in Group A:

Pos	Team	Pld	W	OTW	OTL	L	GF	GA	GD	Pts	Qualification
1	United States	4	4	0	0	0	27	4	+23	12	Quarterfinals
2	Canada	4	3	0	0	1	19	5	+14	9	Quarterfinals
3	Finland (H)	4	2	0	0	2	13	14	−1	6	Quarterfinals
4	Russia	4	1	0	0	3	3	20	−17	3	Quarterfinals
5	Switzerland	4	0	0	0	4	3	22	−19	0	Quarterfinals

Source: IIHF
Rules for classification: 1) points; 2) head-to-head points; 3) head-to-head goal difference; 4) head-to-head number of goals scored; 5) result against closest best-ranked team outside tied teams; 6) result against second-best ranked team outside tied teams; 7) seeding before tournament.
(H) Host
Opponent
Result
Playoff
Opponent
Result
Japan
4–0
Quarterfinals
Czech Republic
3–1
Russia
8–0
Semifinals
Canada
4–2

== Match ==
14 April 2019; 20:00	United States	2–1 GWS (0–0, 1–1, 0–0) (OT: 0–0) (SO: 1–0)	Finland	Espoo Metro Areena, Espoo; Attendance: 6,053

Game reference
Alex Rigsby	Goalies	Noora Räty	Referees: (Germany) Nicole Hertrich (Canada) Lacey Senuk; Linesmen: (Sweden) Veronica Lovensno (Canada) Justine Todd
Pankowski (Coyne Schofield, Pfalzer) – 35:46 / 1–0; / 1–1 / 38:29 – Tapani (Nieminen, Tuominen)			Referees: (Germany) Nicole Hertrich (Canada) Lacey Senuk; Linesmen: (Sweden) Veronica Lovensno (Canada) Justine Todd
Kessel; Pankowski; Carpenter (miss); Knight (miss)	Shootout	(miss) Karvinen; (miss) Savolainen; Tuominen; (miss) Nieminen; (miss) Tapani	Referees: (Germany) Nicole Hertrich (Canada) Lacey Senuk; Linesmen: (Sweden) Veronica Lovensno (Canada) Justine Todd
8 min	Penalties	4 min	Referees: (Germany) Nicole Hertrich (Canada) Lacey Senuk; Linesmen: (Sweden) Veronica Lovensno (Canada) Justine Todd
52	Shots	27	Referees: (Germany) Nicole Hertrich (Canada) Lacey Senuk; Linesmen: (Sweden) Veronica Lovensno (Canada) Justine Todd
