= Espoo United =

Espoo United may refer to:

- Espoo United (basketball)
- Espoo United (ice hockey)
