= Lore Baudrit =

French ice hockey player (born 1991)

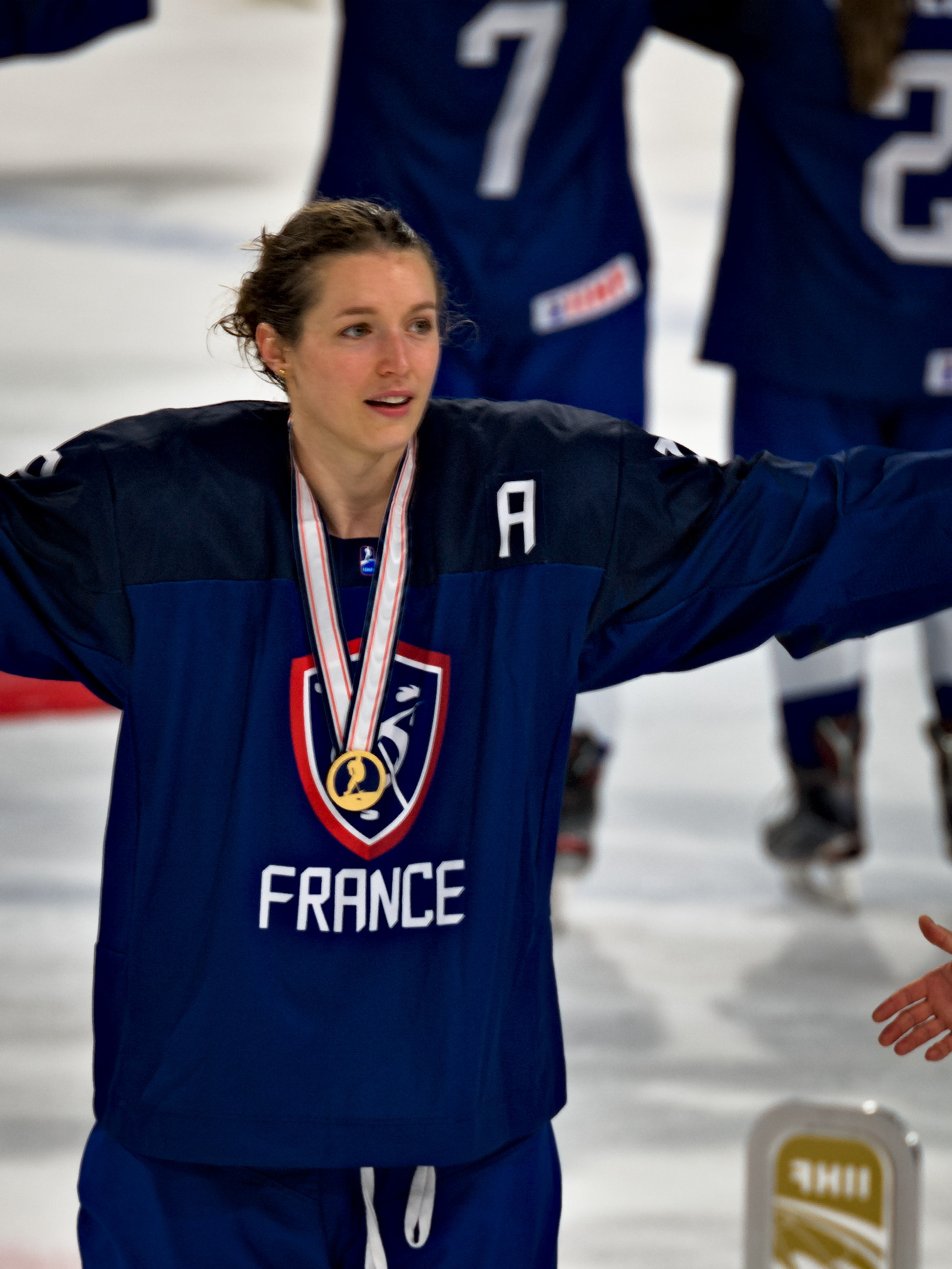
- Baudrit in 2022
- Born: 11 October 1991 (age 34) Castres, France
- Height: 1.90 m (6 ft 3 in)
- Weight: 82 kg (181 lb; 12 st 13 lb)
- Position: Forward
- Shoots: Right
- SDHL team Former teams: Leksands IF: Linköping HC; Modo Hockey; IF Björklöven; Canadiennes de Montréal; Bisonnes de Neuilly-sur-Marne
- National team: France
- Playing career: 2008–present

Lore Baudrit (born 11 October 1991) is a French ice hockey player who competes for the French national team and plays club hockey with Leksands IF in the Swedish Women's Hockey League (SDHL).

She is a lesbian.

== Playing career ==
Baudrit began her senior-level ice hockey career in the 2011–12 season, suiting up for the Bisonnes de Neuilly-sur-Marne in the FFHG Féminin Élite, France's top women's league. During that season, she tallied 15 goals and 20 points across 8 games.

The next year, she relocated to Canada to join the university ice hockey program at the Université de Montréal. In an interview, she shared that while she was unsure about finishing her degree, the chance to combine academics with hockey was a major draw. During her first season, the Carabins won the national championship, though she was sidelined for the final games because of an injury.

After completing five seasons with the Carabins, where she developed her skills and gained valuable experience competing in the top tier of Canadian university women's hockey, Baudrit took the next step in her hockey career. In 2017, her efforts were recognized when she was selected in the 11th round of the Canadian Women's Hockey League (CWHL) draft by the Canadiennes de Montréal.

After spending a year in the CWHL, she went back to Europe, joining IF Björklöven in Sweden's second-tier Damettan for part of the 2018–19 season, before moving up to play for Modo Hockey in the Swedish Women's Hockey League (SDHL).

== International play ==
Baudrit was a key member of the French national women's ice hockey team during the 2019 IIHF Women's World Championship, where she served in a leadership role as an alternate captain.

Baudrit was named team captain for France at the 2026 Winter Olympics. The event marked France's debut in women's ice hockey at the Olympics.

Playing in her first Olympic game on February 5, 2026, Baudrit, wearing number 19, logged 17:33 of ice time.

Baudrit scored France's first goal of the game in an eventual 3–2 loss versus Japan on 6 February 2026, signifying her first Olympic goal.

== Career statistics ==
=== Regular season and playoffs ===
			Regular season					Playoffs
Season	Team	League	GP	G	A	Pts	PIM	GP	G	A	Pts	PIM
2011–12	Bisonnes de Neuilly-sur-Marne	France	8	15	5	20	2	—	—	—	—	—
2012–13	Université de Montréal	RSEQ	17	0	3	3	10	—	—	—	—	—
2013–14	Université de Montréal	RSEQ	20	1	2	3	14	—	—	—	—	—
2014–15	Université de Montréal	RSEQ	17	6	3	9	8	3	1	0	1	0
2015–16	Université de Montréal	RSEQ	19	1	2	3	4	—	—	—	—	—
2016–17	Université de Montréal	RSEQ	17	0	2	2	4	—	—	—	—	—
2017–18	Canadiennes de Montréal	CWHL	16	0	0	0	4	1	0	0	0	0
2018–19	IF Björklöven	Damettan	15	23	27	50	8	—	—	—	—	—
2018–19	Modo Hockey	SDHL	4	3	4	7	4	6	2	1	3	2
2019–20	Modo Hockey	SDHL	36	7	6	13	20	—	—	—	—	—
2020–21	Modo Hockey	SDHL	34	5	5	10	39	2	0	0	0	2
2021–22	Modo Hockey 2	Division 1	1	0	3	3	0	—	—	—	—	—
2021–22	Modo Hockey	SDHL	36	7	7	14	16	3	0	0	0	0
2022–23	Linköping HC	SDHL	32	6	7	13	18	2	0	1	1	0
2023–24	Leksands IF	SDHL	36	4	9	13	18	3	1	0	1	0
SDHL totals			178	32	38	70	115	18	4	5	9	6

=== International ===
Year	Team	Event	Result	GP	G	A	Pts	PIM
2008	France	WC (Div I)	4th	5	0	0	0	2
2009	France	U18 (Div I)	2nd place, silver medalist(s)	4	4	0	4	8
2009	France	WC (Div I)	6th	4	3	0	3	0
2011	France	WC (Div II)	2nd place, silver medalist(s)	4	3	0	3	0
2012	France	WC (Div IB)	3rd place, bronze medalist(s)	5	2	0	2	2
2013	France	WC (Div IB)	1st place, gold medalist(s)	5	4	4	8	10
2014	France	WC (Div IA)	4th	5	1	1	2	0
2015	France	WC (Div IA)	3rd place, bronze medalist(s)	5	1	3	4	6
2016	France	WC (Div IA)	2nd place, silver medalist(s)	5	1	1	2	6
2017	France	WC (Div IA)	6th	5	0	0	0	2
2018	France	WC (Div IA)	1st place, gold medalist(s)	5	3	1	4	0
2019	France	WC	10th	5	0	2	2	2
2022	France	WC (Div IA)	1st place, gold medalist(s)	4	0	4	4	2
2023	France	WC	10th	4	1	1	2	0
2024	France	WC (Div IA)	3rd place, bronze medalist(s)	5	1	4	5	2
2025	France	WC (Div IA)	3rd place, bronze medalist(s)	5	0	2	2	0
2026	France	OG	10th	4	1	0	1	2
2026	France	WC (Div IA)	1st place, gold medalist(s)	5	0	3	3	2
Junior totals				4	4	0	4	8
Senior totals				80	21	26	47	38
