= 2019 IIHF Women's World Championship =

2019 edition of the IIHF Women's World Championship

Tournament details
- Host country: Finland
- Venue: 1 (in 1 host city)
- Dates: 4–14 April 2019
- Opened by: Sauli Niinistö
- Teams: 10

Final positions
- Champions: United States (9th title)
- Runners-up: Finland
- Third place: Canada
- Fourth place: Russia

Tournament statistics
- Games played: 29
- Goals scored: 152 (5.24 per game)
- Attendance: 51,247 (1,767 per game)
- Scoring leader: (United States) Hilary Knight (11 points)

Awards
- MVP: (Finland) Jenni Hiirikoski

Official website
- www.iihf.com

The 2019 IIHF Women's World Championship was the 19th edition of the Top Division of the Women's Ice Hockey World Championship organized by the International Ice Hockey Federation. It was contested in Espoo, Finland from 4 to 14 April 2019 at the Espoo Metro Areena.

The United States won their fifth consecutive and ninth overall title, after a shootout win over Finland. Canada claimed the bronze medal by defeating Russia 7–0.

After the 2017 tournament, it was announced that tournament would expand to ten teams for 2019, having been played with eight teams since the first tournament in 1990, except in 2004, 2007, 2008, and 2009, where nine teams played. The 2004 edition featured nine teams when Japan was promoted from Division II but no team was relegated from the top division in 2003, due to the cancellation of the top division tournament in China because of the outbreak of the SARS disease. Two teams were relegated from the top division in 2004, going back to eight teams for 2005, but due to the success of the 9-team pool in 2004, IIHF decided to expand again to nine teams for 2007. Reverting to eight teams after the 2009 tournament. To bring the tournament to ten teams, Czech Republic which had lost the 2017 Relegation Round, stayed in the top division. Joined by Division I Group A Champions, Japan (2017) and France (2018)

== Venue ==
Espoo
Espoo Metro Areena main rink Capacity: 6,982	Espoo Metro Areena second rink

23 games were played in the main arena, while six games were played at a secondary rink.

== Format ==
The ten teams were split into two groups according to their rankings. In Group A, all teams advanced to the quarterfinals and three teams from Group B advanced. The bottom two Group B teams were relegated. From the quarterfinals on, a knockout system was used.

== Participating teams ==
Group A

- United States
- Canada
- Finland – Hosts
- Russia
- Switzerland

Group B

- Sweden
- Japan – Promoted from Division I Group A in 2017
- Germany
- Czech Republic
- France – Promoted from Division I Group A in 2018

== Match officials ==
12 referees and 10 linesmen are selected for the tournament.

Referees	Linesmen
(Canada) Gabrielle Ariano-Lortie; (Canada) Lacey Senuk; (Finland) Henna Åberg; (Finland) Kaisa Ketonen; (Germany) Nicole Hertrich; (Japan) Miyuki Nakayama; (Russia) Yana Zueva; (Slovakia) Nikoleta Celárová; (Sweden) Maria Furberg; (Sweden) Gabriella Gran; (Switzerland) Anna Maria Wiegand; (United States) Jamie Huntley-Park	(Austria) Julia Kainberger; (Canada) Justine Todd; (Czech Republic) Michaela Štefková; (Finland) Jenni Heikkinen; (Finland) Jenni Jaatinen; (Germany) Lisa Linnek; (Russia) Diana Mokhova; (Sweden) Veronica Lövensnö; (Switzerland) Magali Anex; (United States) Jacqueline Spresser

== Rosters ==
Each team's roster consists of at least 15 skaters (forwards, and defencemen) and 2 goaltenders, and at most 20 skaters and 3 goaltenders. All ten participating nations, through the confirmation of their respective national associations, had to submit a "Long List" roster no later than two weeks before the tournament.

== Preliminary round ==
The schedule was released on 20 August 2018.

All times are local (Eastern European Summer Time – UTC+3).

=== Group A ===
Pos	Team	Pld	W	OTW	OTL	L	GF	GA	GD	Pts	Qualification
1	United States	4	4	0	0	0	27	4	+23	12	Quarterfinals
2	Canada	4	3	0	0	1	19	5	+14	9	Quarterfinals
3	Finland (H)	4	2	0	0	2	13	14	−1	6	Quarterfinals
4	Russia	4	1	0	0	3	3	20	−17	3	Quarterfinals
5	Switzerland	4	0	0	0	4	3	22	−19	0	Quarterfinals

Source: IIHF
Rules for classification: 1) points; 2) head-to-head points; 3) head-to-head goal difference; 4) head-to-head number of goals scored; 5) result against closest best-ranked team outside tied teams; 6) result against second-best ranked team outside tied teams; 7) seeding before tournament.
(H) Host

4 April 2019; 16:00	Switzerland	0–6 (0–2, 0–0, 0–4)	Canada	Espoo Metro Areena, Espoo; Attendance: 649

Game reference

Andrea Brändli
Goalies
Shannon Szabados
Referees:
(Finland) Henna Åberg
(Japan) Miyuki Nakayama
Linesmen:
(Finland) Jenni Jaatinen
(United States) Jacqueline Spresser

0–1	09:08 – Gabel (Jenner, Bourbonnais)
0–2	09:24 – Spooner (Nurse, Fast)
0–3	41:35 – Clark (Spooner, Hart)
0–4	47:43 – Clark (Larocque, Ambrose)
0–5	52:54 – Rattray (Fortino, Stacey)
0–6	58:03 – Turnbull (Fortino, Fast)

6 min
Penalties
6 min
6
Shots
53

4 April 2019; 19:30	Finland	2–6 (1–1, 1–0, 0–5)	United States	Espoo Metro Areena, Espoo; Attendance: 4,046

Game reference

Noora Räty
Goalies
Alex Rigsby
Referees:
(Sweden) Gabriella Gran
(Germany) Nicole Hertrich
Linesmen:
(Austria) Julia Kainberger
(Canada) Justine Todd

Holopainen (Vainikka, Hakala) – 09:28	1–0
	1–1	17:48 – Coyne Schofield (Knight) (EA)
Nieminen (Hiirikoski, Välilä) (PP) – 31:18	2–1
	2–2	43:10 – Samoskevich (Keller)
	2–3	44:51 – Knight (Brandt)
	2–4	47:38 – Carpenter (Barnes, Kessel) (PP)
	2–5	51:35 – Decker (Coyne Schofield)
	2–6	57:29 – Pankowski (Carpenter, Coyne Schofield)

4 min
Penalties
10 min
23
Shots
45

5 April 2019; 19:30	Russia	2–1 (1–1, 0–0, 1–0)	Switzerland	Espoo Metro Areena, Espoo; Attendance: 629

Game reference

Nadezhda Morozova
Goalies
Janine Alder
Referees:
(Finland) Kaisa Ketonen
(Canada) Lacey Senuk
Linesmen:
(Germany) Lisa Linnek
(Canada) Justine Todd

	0–1	13:41 – Raselli (Enzler, Müller) (PP2)
Timofeyeva (Sosina) (PP) – 19:50	1–1
Sosina (Shibanova, Pirogova) (PP2) – 59:23	2–1

12 min
Penalties
12 min
43
Shots
11

6 April 2019; 16:00	Russia	0–4 (0–1, 0–0, 0–3)	Finland	Espoo Metro Areena, Espoo; Attendance: 5,723

Game reference

Valeria Merkusheva
Anna Prugova
Goalies
Noora Räty
Referees:
(Canada) Gabrielle Ariano-Lortie
(United States) Jamie Huntley-Park
Linesmen:
(Czech Republic) Michaela Štefková
(Canada) Justine Todd / (United States) Jacqueline Spresser

0–1	06:06 – Nieminen (Tulus)
0–2	43:07 – Hakala (Vainikka, Holopainen)
0–3	46:30 – Vainikka (Hakala, Tapani)
0–4	47:53 – Holopainen (Vainikka)

10 min
Penalties
8 min
18
Shots
37

6 April 2019; 19:30	United States	3–2 (2–1, 1–1, 0–0)	Canada	Espoo Metro Areena, Espoo; Attendance: 3,102

Game reference

Alex Rigsby
Goalies
Emerance Maschmeyer
Referees:
(Finland) Kaisa Ketonen
(Switzerland) Anna Maria Wiegand
Linesmen:
(Switzerland) Magali Anex
(Finland) Jenni Heikkinen

Knight (Cameranesi) – 04:23	1–0
	1–1	06:27 – Nurse (Jenner, Lacquette) (PP)
Coyne Schofield – 18:13	2–1
	2–2	21:55 – Jenner (Lacquette, Nurse) (PP)
Pankowski (Barnes) (PP) – 34:03	3–2

14 min
Penalties
12 min
30
Shots
33

7 April 2019; 19:30	Switzerland	0–8 (0–3, 0–1, 0–4)	United States	Espoo Metro Areena, Espoo; Attendance: 343

Game reference

Janine Alder
Goalies
Maddie Rooney
Referees:
(Canada) Gabrielle Ariano-Lortie
(Russia) Yana Zueva
Linesmen:
(Finland) Jenni Heikkinen
(Russia) Diana Mokhova

0–1	03:41 – Carpenter
0–2	09:41 – Cameranesi (Pfalzer, Stecklein)
0–3	15:02 – Keller (Decker) (PP)
0–4	20:52 – Kessel (Coyne Schofield)
0–5	50:05 – Kessel (Bozek, Carpenter)
0–6	54:39 – Keller (Barnes, Pannek) (PP)
0–7	56:01 – Knight (Pfalzer, Cameranesi)
0–8	59:38 – Cameranesi (Compher)

6 min
Penalties
2 min
6
Shots
57

8 April 2019; 16:00	Finland	6–2 (2–1, 2–1, 2–0)	Switzerland	Espoo Metro Areena, Espoo; Attendance: 3,226

Game reference

Eveliina Suonpää
Goalies
Andrea Brändli
Referees:
(Canada) Gabrielle Ariano-Lortie
(Canada) Lacey Senuk
Linesmen:
(Sweden) Veronica Lovensno
(United States) Jacqueline Spresser

	0–1	13:34 – Raselli (Enzler)
Tapani (Hiirikoski, Sallinen) – 14:02	1–1
Lindstedt (Hiirikoski, Tulus) (PP) – 17:59	2–1
	2–2	25:48 – Müller (Bullo) (PP)
Välimäki (Lindstedt, Rahunen) – 33:31	3–2
Karvinen (Hiirikoski) – 37:12	4–2
Tuominen (Sallinen, Karvinen) – 47:14	5–2
Karvinen (Tapani, Hiirikoski) – 49:43	6–2

4 min
Penalties
4 min
45
Shots
17

8 April 2019; 19:30	Canada	5–1 (1–0, 4–0, 0–1)	Russia	Espoo Metro Areena, Espoo; Attendance: 285

Game reference

Geneviève Lacasse
Goalies
Anna Prugova
Nadezhda Morozova
Referees:
(Sweden) Gabriella Gran
(United States) Jamie Huntley-Park
Linesmen:
(Finland) Jenni Heikkinen
(Austria) Julia Kainberger

Spooner (Lacquette, Jenner) (PP) – 13:43	1–0
Johnston (Daoust) – 24:22	2–0
Turnbull (Spooner, Ambrose) – 26:22	3–0
Spooner (Lacquette, Jenner) (PP) – 31:42	4–0
Spooner (Fortino) – 35:16	5–0
	5–1	41:01 – Ganeyeva (Batalova, Dergachyova) (PP)

4 min
Penalties
8 min
45
Shots
8

9 April 2019; 16:00	United States	10–0 (3–0, 4–0, 3–0)	Russia	Espoo Metro Areena, Espoo; Attendance: 954

Game reference

Alex Rigsby
Goalies
Valeria Merkusheva
Anna Prugova
Referees:
(Slovakia) Nikoleta Celárová
(Switzerland) Anna Maria Wiegand
Linesmen:
(Switzerland) Magali Anex
(Finland) Jenni Jaatinen

Kessel (Carpenter, Pannek) – 02:07	1–0
Barnes (Keller) – 13:44	2–0
Coyne Schofield – 14:01	3–0
Bozek (Pankowski, Picard) – 23:50	4–0
Stecklein (Brodt, Scamurra) – 28:18	5–0
Knight (Carpenter, Pfalzer) (EA) – 32:41	6–0
Coyne Schofield (Pankowski, Decker) (PP) – 39:07	7–0
Decker (Pankowski, Bellamy) – 46:01	8–0
Stecklein – 52:11	9–0
Samoskevich – 57:12	10–0

4 min
Penalties
6 min
44
Shots
12

9 April 2019; 19:30	Canada	6–1 (2–0, 2–0, 2–1)	Finland	Espoo Metro Areena, Espoo; Attendance: 4,752

Game reference

Shannon Szabados
Goalies
Noora Räty
Eveliina Suonpää
Referees:
(Sweden) Maria Furberg
(Germany) Nicole Hertrich
Linesmen:
(Germany) Lisa Linnek
(Sweden) Veronica Lovensno

Gabel (Bettez, Fast) – 10:44	1–0
Johnston (Ambrose, Saulnier) – 14:00	2–0
Gabel (Bettez, Bourbonnais) – 35:35	3–0
Jenner (Gabel) – 38:23	4–0
	4–1	42:42 – Viitasuo (Välilä)
Nurse (Spooner, Fast) – 49:51	5–1
Ambrose (Rattray, Daoust) – 51:32	6–1

10 min
Penalties
12 min
49
Shots
23

=== Group B ===
Pos	Team	Pld	W	OTW	OTL	L	GF	GA	GD	Pts	Qualification
1	Czech Republic	4	4	0	0	0	13	5	+8	12	Quarterfinals
2	Germany	4	1	1	1	1	7	8	−1	6 (Note: Japan 2–3 Germany)	Quarterfinals
3	Japan	4	2	0	0	2	9	8	+1	6	Quarterfinals
4	Sweden	4	1	0	1	2	8	11	−3	4	Ninth place game
5	France	4	0	1	0	3	5	10	−5	2	Ninth place game

Source: IIHF
Rules for classification: 1) points; 2) head-to-head points; 3) head-to-head goal difference; 4) head-to-head number of goals scored; 5) result against closest best-ranked team outside tied teams; 6) result against second-best ranked team outside tied teams; 7) seeding before tournament.
Notes:

4 April 2019; 12:30	Germany	2–1 GWS (0–0, 1–1, 0–0) (OT: 0–0) (SO: 1–0)	Sweden	Espoo Metro Areena, Espoo; Attendance: 1,893

Game reference
Jennifer Harß	Goalies	Sara Grahn	Referees: (United States) Jamie Huntley-Park (Switzerland) Anna Maria Wiegand; Linesmen: (Russia) Diana Mokhova (Czech Republic) Michaela Štefková
/ 0–1 / 29:53 – Engström (H. Olsson, M. Olsson); Nix (Gleißner, Lanzl) (PP) – 34:09 / 1–1			Referees: (United States) Jamie Huntley-Park (Switzerland) Anna Maria Wiegand; Linesmen: (Russia) Diana Mokhova (Czech Republic) Michaela Štefková
Nix (miss); Lanzl (miss); Kluge; Zorn (miss); Spielberger (miss)	Shootout	(miss) H. Olsson; (miss) Nordin; (miss) Lundin; (miss) M. Olsson; (miss) Nylén Persson	Referees: (United States) Jamie Huntley-Park (Switzerland) Anna Maria Wiegand; Linesmen: (Russia) Diana Mokhova (Czech Republic) Michaela Štefková
10 min	Penalties	12 min	Referees: (United States) Jamie Huntley-Park (Switzerland) Anna Maria Wiegand; Linesmen: (Russia) Diana Mokhova (Czech Republic) Michaela Štefková
15	Shots	41	Referees: (United States) Jamie Huntley-Park (Switzerland) Anna Maria Wiegand; Linesmen: (Russia) Diana Mokhova (Czech Republic) Michaela Štefková

4 April 2019; 18:00	France	0–3 (0–0, 0–2, 0–1)	Japan	Espoo Metro Areena second rink, Espoo; Attendance: 202

Game reference

Caroline Baldin
Goalies
Nana Fujimoto
Referees:
(Slovakia) Nikoleta Celárová
(Russia) Yana Zueva
Linesmen:
(Switzerland) Magali Anex
(Germany) Lisa Linnek

0–1	27:28 – Miura (Ukita)
0–2	30:45 – A. Toko (Osawa)
0–3	53:15 – Hosoyamada (Koike) (PP)

10 min
Penalties
8 min
25
Shots
38

5 April 2019; 16:00	Czech Republic	3–1 (2–0, 1–0, 0–1)	France	Espoo Metro Areena, Espoo; Attendance: 553

Game reference

Klára Peslarová
Goalies
Caroline Baldin
Referees:
(Finland) Henna Åberg
(Sweden) Maria Furberg
Linesmen:
(Sweden) Veronica Lovensno
(United States) Jacqueline Spresser

Mrázová (Křížová) (PP) – 05:06	1–0
Hymlárová (Mills, Tejralová) (PP) – 09:44	2–0
Lédlová (Vanišová) – 23:26	3–0
	3–1	52:21 – Passard (Duvin, Allemoz) (PP)

2 min
Penalties
12 min
43
Shots
17

6 April 2019; 12:30	Sweden	3–5 (2–1, 0–1, 1–2)	Czech Republic	Espoo Metro Areena, Espoo; Attendance: 1,024

Game reference

Sara Grahn
Goalies
Klára Peslarová
Referees:
(Japan) Miyuki Nakayama
(Canada) Lacey Senuk
Linesmen:
(Finland) Jenni Jaatinen
(Germany) Lisa Linnek

H. Olsson (Adolfsson, Rask) (PP) – 06:55	1–0
	1–1	10:04 – Mlýnková (Hymlárová)
Nordin (Winberg, Rask) – 14:22	2–1
	2–2	28:27 – Hymlárová (Tejralová, Mills) (PP)
	2–3	36:30 – Přibylová (Studentová, Mrázová) (PP)
	2–4	49:46 – Křížová (Mrázová)
Grahm (Nordin) (EA) – 57:56	3–4
	3–5	59:45 – Vanišová (Horálková) (EN)

10 min
Penalties
6 min
25
Shots
28

6 April 2019; 18:00	Japan	2–3 (0–1, 0–0, 2–2)	Germany	Espoo Metro Areena second rink, Espoo; Attendance: 135

Game reference

Nana Fujimoto
Goalies
Jennifer Harß
Referees:
(Sweden) Maria Furberg
(Sweden) Gabriella Gran
Linesmen:
(Austria) Julia Kainberger
(Sweden) Veronica Lovensno

	0–1	10:51 – Fiegert (Zorn, Spielberger) (PP)
	0–2	46:07 – Haider (Kluge, Fiegert) (PP)
Osawa (Taka, M. Fujimoto) – 47:49	1–2
Kubo (H. Toko) – 48:00	2–2
	2–3	56:55 – Delarbre (Zorn, Spielberger)

8 min
Penalties
4 min
41
Shots
18

7 April 2019; 16:00	France	1–2 (1–0, 0–2, 0–0)	Sweden	Espoo Metro Areena, Espoo; Attendance: 553

Game reference

Caroline Baldin
Goalies
Sara Grahn
Referees:
(Germany) Nicole Hertrich
(Japan) Miyuki Nakayama
Linesmen:
(Austria) Julia Kainberger
(United States) Jacqueline Spresser

Escudero (Baudrit, Allemoz) – 15:18	1–0
	1–1	26:55 – M. Olsson (H. Olsson)
	1–2	34:01 – Winberg (Rask, Nordin)

8 min
Penalties
8 min
20
Shots
40

8 April 2019; 12:30	Japan	1–3 (0–2, 0–0, 1–1)	Czech Republic	Espoo Metro Areena, Espoo; Attendance: 1,232

Game reference

Nana Fujimoto
Goalies
Klára Peslarová
Referees:
(Germany) Nicole Hertrich
(Switzerland) Anna Maria Wiegand
Linesmen:
(Switzerland) Magali Anex
(Russia) Diana Mokhova

	0–1	03:34 – Křížová (Pejzlová)
	0–2	08:45 – Přibylová (Kolowratová, Mašková)
Kubo (PP) – 53:32	1–2
	1–3	59:16 – Vanišová (EN)

10 min
Penalties
6 min
12
Shots
27

8 April 2019; 18:00	Germany	2–3 OT (1–1, 1–1, 0–0) (OT: 0–1)	France	Espoo Metro Areena second rink, Espoo; Attendance: 136

Game reference

Jennifer Harß
Goalies
Caroline Lambert
Referees:
(Slovakia) Nikoleta Celárová
(Sweden) Maria Furberg
Linesmen:
(Finland) Jenni Jaatinen
(Czech Republic) Michaela Štefková

	0–1	00:22 – Escudero (Locatelli)
Eisenschmid (Karpf) – 12:37	1–1
Spielberger (Zorn) – 21:59	2–1
	2–2	28:15 – Duvin (Baudrit, Aurard) (PP)
	2–3	61:44 – Aurard

8 min
Penalties
12 min
43
Shots
22

9 April 2019; 12:30	Sweden	2–3 (1–0, 0–1, 1–2)	Japan	Espoo Metro Areena, Espoo; Attendance: 1,380

Game reference

Sara Grahn
Goalies
Nana Fujimoto
Referees:
(Finland) Henna Åberg
(Canada) Lacey Senuk
Linesmen:
(Russia) Diana Mokhova
(Czech Republic) Michaela Štefková

Nordin (Winberg, Rask) – 02:36	1–0
	1–1	36:02 – Yoneyama (Osawa)
Engström (H. Olsson) – 47:10	2–1
	2–2	51:10 – Shiga (A. Toko, Kubo) (PP)
	2–3	58:45 – A. Toko (H. Toko, Kubo) (PP)

8 min
Penalties
6 min
30
Shots
15

9 April 2019; 18:00	Czech Republic	2–0 (0–0, 2–0, 0–0)	Germany	Espoo Metro Areena second rink, Espoo; Attendance: 102

Game reference
Kristýna Bláhová	Goalies	Ivonne Schröder	Referees: (Finland) Kaisa Ketonen (Russia) Yana Zueva; Linesmen: (Finland) Jenni Heikkinen (Canada) Justine Todd
Mills (Tejralová, Hymlarová) (PP) – 33:07 / 1–0; Mills – 35:07 / 2–0			Referees: (Finland) Kaisa Ketonen (Russia) Yana Zueva; Linesmen: (Finland) Jenni Heikkinen (Canada) Justine Todd
10 min	Penalties	14 min	Referees: (Finland) Kaisa Ketonen (Russia) Yana Zueva; Linesmen: (Finland) Jenni Heikkinen (Canada) Justine Todd
37	Shots	10	Referees: (Finland) Kaisa Ketonen (Russia) Yana Zueva; Linesmen: (Finland) Jenni Heikkinen (Canada) Justine Todd

== Knockout stage ==
=== Bracket ===
Quarterfinals
11 April
United States	4
Japan	0
11 April
Russia	3
Switzerland	0
11 April
Canada	5
Germany	0
11 April
Finland	3
Czech Republic	1

Semifinals
13 April
United States	8
Russia	0
13 April
Canada	2
Finland	4

Final
14 April
United States (GWS)	2
Finland	1
Third place
14 April
Russia	0
Canada	7

=== Ninth place game ===
11 April 2019; 14:00	Sweden	3–2 (0–0, 1–0, 2–2)	France	Espoo Metro Areena second rink, Espoo; Attendance: 142

Game reference

Sara Grahn
Goalies
Caroline Baldin
Referees:
(Japan) Miyuki Nakayama
(Russia) Yana Zueva
Linesmen:
(Germany) Nicole Hertrich
(Czech Republic) Michaela Štefková

Lundin (Holmgren, H. Olsson) – 36:41	1–0
Nordin (Winberg, Nyhlén-Persson) (PP) – 48:02	2–0
	2–1	53:26 – Rozier (Locatelli)
Palm (Nordin, Winberg) – 54:31	3–1
	3–2	56:54 – Aurard (Duvin) (PP)

8 min
Penalties
8 min
34
Shots
26

=== Quarterfinals ===
11 April 2019; 12:30	United States	4–0 (1–0, 1–0, 2–0)	Japan	Espoo Metro Areena, Espoo; Attendance: 2,483

Game reference

Maddie Rooney
Goalies
Nana Fujimoto
Referees:
(Finland) Henna Åberg
(Slovakia) Nikoleta Celárová
Linesmen:
(Switzerland) Magali Anex
(Finland) Jenni Jaatinen

Knight (Picard, Carpenter) – 16:48	1–0
Cameranesi (Keller, Barnes) (PP) – 29:22	2–0
Barnes (Kessel, Brodt) – 42:51	3–0
Coyne Schofield – 50:36	4–0

4 min
Penalties
4 min
53
Shots
10

11 April 2019; 16:00	Canada	5–0 (1–0, 2–0, 2–0)	Germany	Espoo Metro Areena, Espoo; Attendance: 744

Game reference

Emerance Maschmeyer
Goalies
Jennifer Harß
Referees:
(Sweden) Gabriella Gran
(Finland) Kaisa Ketonen
Linesmen:
(Sweden) Veronica Lovensno
(Russia) Diana Mokhova

Turnbull (Larocque, Ambrose) – 07:40	1–0
Jenner (Nurse, Lacquette) (PP) – 27:02	2–0
Stacey (Rattray, Hart) – 29:26	3–0
Spooner (Lacquette, Jenner) (PP) – 43:11	4–0
Turnbull (Daoust, Fortino) (PP) – 51:32	5–0

6 min
Penalties
8 min
66
Shots
9

11 April 2019; 18:00	Russia	3–0 (0–0, 1–0, 2–0)	Switzerland	Espoo Metro Areena second rink, Espoo; Attendance: 114

Game reference

Nadezhda Morozova
Goalies
Andrea Brändli
Referees:
(Canada) Gabrielle Ariano-Lortie
(Sweden) Maria Furberg
Linesmen:
(Finland) Jenni Heikkinen
(Austria) Julia Kainberger

Shokhina (Shtaryova, Dergachyova) – 32:04	1–0
Dergachyova (Shokhina, Shibanova) (PP) – 45:24	2–0
Shtaryova (Shokhina) (EN) – 58:22	3–0

4 min
Penalties
8 min
44
Shots
14

11 April 2019; 19:30	Finland	3–1 (0–0, 2–1, 1–0)	Czech Republic	Espoo Metro Areena, Espoo; Attendance: 3,290

Game reference

Noora Räty
Goalies
Klára Peslarová
Referees:
(United States) Jamie Huntley-Park
(Canada) Lacey Senuk
Linesmen:
(United States) Jacqueline Spresser
(Canada) Justine Todd

	0–1	21:31 – Mlýnková (Mills, Horálková)
Karvinen (Hiirikoski, Tulus) (PP) – 27:42	1–1
Tapani (Karvinen, Hiirikoski) – 35:58	2–1
Hiirikoski (Karvinen, Tulus) (PP) – 50:53	3–1

2 min
Penalties
8 min
43
Shots
17

=== Semifinals ===
13 April 2019; 16:00	Canada	2–4 (1–1, 1–2, 0–1)	Finland	Espoo Metro Areena, Espoo; Attendance: 4,311

Game reference

Shannon Szabados
Goalies
Noora Räty
Referees:
(Germany) Nicole Hertrich
(United States) Jamie Huntley-Park
Linesmen:
(Sweden) Veronica Lovensno
(Russia) Diana Mokhova

Rattray (Stacey) – 02:32	1–0
	1–1	16:23 – Savolainen (Hiirikoski, Tulus) (PP)
	1–2	26:50 – Hiirikoski (Tulus, Savolainen) (PP)
Gabel (Jenner, Bettez) – 27:53	2–2
	2–3	36:18 – Tapani (Laitinen, Karvinen)
	2–4	59:22 – Savolainen (EN)

8 min
Penalties
10 min
45
Shots
19

13 April 2019; 20:00	United States	8–0 (1–0, 5–0, 2–0)	Russia	Espoo Metro Areena, Espoo; Attendance: 897

Game reference

Alex Rigsby
Goalies
Anna Prugova
Valeria Merkusheva
Referees:
(Canada) Gabrielle Ariano-Lortie
(Finland) Kaisa Ketonen
Linesmen:
(Finland) Jenni Heikkinen
(Austria) Julia Kainberger

Knight (Pannek, Cameranesi) – 11:07	1–0
Pankowski (Decker) – 23:45	2–0
Pfalzer (Knight, Picard) – 26:18	3–0
Bozek (Knight) – 29:59	4–0
Pannek (Stecklein) – 30:23	5–0
Knight (Pfalzer) – 38:13	6–0
Scamurra (Bozek, Keller) – 46:50	7–0
Pannek (Knight, Cameranesi) (PP) – 51:33	8–0

0 min
Penalties
14 min
49
Shots
11

=== Bronze medal game ===
14 April 2019; 16:00	Canada	7–0 (2–0, 1–0, 4–0)	Russia	Espoo Metro Areena, Espoo; Attendance: 2,294

Game reference

Geneviève Lacasse
Goalies
Nadezhda Morozova
Anna Prugova
Referees:
(United States) Jamie Huntley-Park
(Switzerland) Anna Maria Wiegand
Linesmen:
(Finland) Jenni Heikkinen
(United States) Jacqueline Spresser

Spooner (Johnston, Fast) – 06:08	1–0
Bourbonnais (Nurse, Spooner) – 15:31	2–0
Johnston (Nurse) – 29:38	3–0
Gabel (Fast) – 43:09	4–0
Rattray (Ambrose, Daoust) (PP) – 48:13	5–0
Ambrose (Rattray, Lacquette) (PP) – 54:21	6–0
Gabel (Bettez, Larocque) – 55:10	7–0

4 min
Penalties
18 min
41
Shots
6

=== Final ===
==== Controversy ====
During the final between the United States and Finland, it appeared Finland had won 2–1 in overtime after a game-winning goal to win its first World Championship. However, Finland celebrated on the ice before the Video Goal Judge initiated a video review. The goal was reviewed for over ten minutes and eventually overturned. In a press statement released the next day, stating that despite the US goaltender propelling herself out of the crease and directly into the onrushing Finnish player, for which the goaltender was assessed a tripping penalty, the IIHF retroactively defended the decision of its video review personnel by simply citing rules 186 and 183ii – with no further elaboration – as the reasons for overturning the goal. The United States went on to defeat Finland 2–1 in shootout. It was later announced that Finnish Ice Hockey Association would pay the Finnish team the bonus allotted for winning a gold medal, instead of the silver medal bonus.

14 April 2019; 20:00	United States	2–1 GWS (0–0, 1–1, 0–0) (OT: 0–0) (SO: 1–0)	Finland	Espoo Metro Areena, Espoo; Attendance: 6,053

Game reference
Alex Rigsby	Goalies	Noora Räty	Referees: (Germany) Nicole Hertrich (Canada) Lacey Senuk; Linesmen: (Sweden) Veronica Lovensno (Canada) Justine Todd
Pankowski (Coyne Schofield, Pfalzer) – 35:46 / 1–0; / 1–1 / 38:29 – Tapani (Nieminen, Tuominen)			Referees: (Germany) Nicole Hertrich (Canada) Lacey Senuk; Linesmen: (Sweden) Veronica Lovensno (Canada) Justine Todd
Kessel; Pankowski; Carpenter (miss); Knight (miss)	Shootout	(miss) Karvinen; (miss) Savolainen; Tuominen; (miss) Nieminen; (miss) Tapani	Referees: (Germany) Nicole Hertrich (Canada) Lacey Senuk; Linesmen: (Sweden) Veronica Lovensno (Canada) Justine Todd
8 min	Penalties	4 min	Referees: (Germany) Nicole Hertrich (Canada) Lacey Senuk; Linesmen: (Sweden) Veronica Lovensno (Canada) Justine Todd
52	Shots	27	Referees: (Germany) Nicole Hertrich (Canada) Lacey Senuk; Linesmen: (Sweden) Veronica Lovensno (Canada) Justine Todd

== Final standings ==
Pos	Grp	Team	Pld	W	OTW	OTL	L	GF	GA	GD	Pts	Final result
1	A	United States	7	6	1	0	0	41	5	+36	20	Champions
2	A	Finland (H)	7	4	0	1	2	21	19	+2	13	Runners-up
3	A	Canada	7	5	0	0	2	33	9	+24	15	Third place
4	A	Russia	7	2	0	0	5	6	35	−29	6	Fourth place
5	A	Switzerland	5	0	0	0	5	3	25	−22	0	Eliminated in Quarter-finals
6	B	Czech Republic	5	4	0	0	1	14	8	+6	12	Eliminated in Quarter-finals
7	B	Germany	5	1	1	1	2	7	13	−6	6	Eliminated in Quarter-finals
8	B	Japan	5	2	0	0	3	9	12	−3	6	Eliminated in Quarter-finals
9	B	Sweden	5	2	0	1	2	11	13	−2	7	Did not play World Championship in 2021 (Note: Sweden were originally supposed to be relegated to Division I A, but that was not played in 2020 and 2021 due to the COVID-19 pandemic. Subsequently, Sweden were supposed to play in the 2022 Division I A, but in the end they remained in the Top Division as a substitute for the expelled Russia.)
10	B	France	5	0	1	0	4	7	13	−6	2	Relegated to the 2022 Division I A

Source: IIHF
Rules for classification: 1) Group; 2) position in the group; 3) number of points; 4) goal difference; 5) goals scored; 6) seeding before tournament.
(H) Host

== Awards and statistics ==
=== Awards ===
- Best players selected by the directorate:
  - Best Goaltender: (Finland) Noora Räty
  - Best Defenceman: (Finland) Jenni Hiirikoski
  - Best Forward: (United States) Kendall Coyne Schofield

Source: IIHF.com

- All-star team
  - Goaltender: (Finland) Noora Räty
  - Defence: (Finland) Jenni Hiirikoski, (United States) Cayla Barnes
  - Forwards: (United States) Hilary Knight, (United States) Kendall Coyne Schofield, (Finland) Michelle Karvinen
- MVP: (Finland) Jenni Hiirikoski

Source: IIHF.com

=== Scoring leaders ===
List shows the top skaters sorted by points, then goals.

Player	GP	G	A	Pts	+/−	PIM	POS
(United States) Hilary Knight	7	7	4	11	+13	4	F
(Canada) Natalie Spooner	7	6	4	10	+9	4	F
(Finland) Jenni Hiirikoski	7	2	8	10	+5	0	D
(United States) Kendall Coyne Schofield	7	5	4	9	+11	2	F
(Canada) Brianne Jenner	7	3	6	9	+3	4	F
(Canada) Sarah Nurse	7	2	6	8	+8	2	F
(Canada) Loren Gabel	7	6	1	7	+6	2	F
(United States) Annie Pankowski	7	4	3	7	+10	2	F
(United States) Dani Cameranesi	7	3	4	7	+12	2	F
(Finland) Michelle Karvinen	7	3	4	7	−1	2	F

GP = Games played; G = Goals; A = Assists; Pts = Points; +/− = Plus/minus; PIM = Penalties in minutes; POS = Position
Source: IIHF.com

=== Leading goaltenders ===
Only the top five goaltenders, based on save percentage, who have played at least 40% of their team's minutes, are included in this list.

Player	TOI	GA	GAA	SA	Sv%	SO
(United States) Alex Rigsby	320:00	5	0.94	106	95.28	2
(Finland) Noora Räty	354:47	13	2.20	205	93.66	1
(Germany) Jennifer Harß	246:44	11	2.67	170	93.53	0
(France) Caroline Baldin	237:46	11	2.78	155	92.90	0
(Japan) Nana Fujimoto	299:20	11	2.20	152	92.76	1

TOI = Time on Ice (minutes:seconds); SA = Shots against; GA = Goals against; GAA = Goals against average; Sv% = Save percentage; SO = Shutouts
Source: IIHF.com
