= Kanae Aoki =

Japanese ice hockey player and coach

Kanae Aoki 青木 香奈枝
- Born: 20 February 1985 (age 41)
- Height: 1.65 m (5 ft 5 in)
- Weight: 60 kg (132 lb; 9 st 6 lb)
- Position: Defence
- Shot: Right
- Played for: Calgary Inferno; Mitsuboshi Daito Perigrine
- National team: Japan
- Playing career: c. 2003–2017
- Coaching career: 2017–present
Medal record
Asian Winter Games
Silver medal – second place	2003 Aomori	Ice hockey
Challenge Cup of Asia
Gold medal – first place	2012 China

Kanae Aoki (Japanese: 青木香奈枝, Hepburn: Aoki Kanae; born 20 February 1985) is a Japanese retired ice hockey player, currently serving as assistant coach to the Japanese women's national under-18 ice hockey team.

== Playing career ==
Aoki represented Japan in the women's ice hockey tournament at the 2014 Winter Olympics, the women's ice hockey tournament at the 2003 Asian Winter Games, the 2012 IIHF Women's Challenge Cup of Asia (CCOA), and at four IIHF Women's World Championships, in the Top Division in 2004 and 2015, and in Division I in 2012 and 2013.

Her club career was played with Mitsuboshi Daito Peregrine (now DK Peregrine) of the All-Japan Women's Ice Hockey Championship and Women's Japan Ice Hockey League (WJIHL) and with the Calgary Inferno of the Canadian Women's Hockey League (CWHL).

Aoki was drafted by the Calgary Inferno in the 6th round of the 2015 CWHL Draft. She scored her first goal for Calgary on 14 November 2015 against Les Canadiennes de Montréal. Appearing with the Calgary Inferno in the 2016 Clarkson Cup finals, she joined teammate Aina Takeuchi as the first women from Japan to win the Clarkson Cup, as the Inferno prevailed in an 8–3 final against Les Canadiennes.
