= Athéna Locatelli =

French ice hockey player

- Born: 16 July 1991 (age 34) Bourg-de-Péage, ARA, France
- Height: 1.6 m (5 ft 3 in)
- Weight: 59 kg (130 lb; 9 st 4 lb)
- Position: Defense
- Shoots: Left
- Auroraliiga team: IFK Helsinki
- National team: France
- Playing career: 2008–present

Athéna Locatelli (born 16 July 1991) is a French ice hockey player who is a defenseman and captain for IFK Helsinki (HIFK) in the Finnish Auroraliiga.

As a member of the French national team, she participated in eleven IIHF World Championship tournaments, including the Top Division tournaments in 2019 and 2023.

== International play ==
After fifteen seasons with the French national team, Locatelli announced her retirement from international competition in February 2024.

== Career statistics ==
=== Regular season and playoffs ===
			Regular season					Playoffs
Season	Team	League	GP	G	A	Pts	PIM	GP	G	A	Pts	PIM
2012–13	University of Montreal	RSEQ	17	0	3	3	6	—	—	—	—	—
2013–14	University of Montreal	RSEQ	14	1	2	3	4	—	—	—	—	—
2015–16	Villard-de-Lans U18	U18 Élite A^{†}	1	0	0	0	0	—	—	—	—	—
2016–17	Villard-de-Lans U17	U17 Élite^{†}	19	0	6	6	4	—	—	—	—	—
2016–17	Villard-de-Lans U20	U20 Élite^{†}	6	1	2	3	2	—	—	—	—	—
2017–18	Villard-de-Lans U17	U17 Élite^{†}	15	3	1	4	8	—	—	—	—	—
2018–19	Pôle France Féminin	U17 Élite^{†}	15	3	1	4	8	—	—	—	—	—
2019–20	Villard-de-Lans U20	U20 Élite^{†}	18	0	1	1	0	—	—	—	—	—
2019–20	HIFK	NSML	2	0	2	2	0	3	0	0	0	0
2020–21	HIFK	NSML	26	5	14	19	8	8	0	3	3	4
2021–22	HIFK	NSML	26	1	17	18	4	12	5	4	9	6
2022–23	HIFK	NSML	34	6	23	29	18	9	1	7	8	2
2023–24	HIFK	NSML	30	5	16	21	4	11	1	7	8	0
Naisten Liiga totals			118	17	72	89	34	43	7	21	28	12

^{†} Men's junior ice hockey league in France

=== International ===
Year	Team	Event	Result	GP	G	A	Pts	PIM
2008	France	WC D1	4th	5	0	0	0	0
2009	France	WC D1	6th	5	1	1	2	2
2009	France	U18 D1	2nd	4	1	0	1	6
2011	France	WC D2	2nd	4	1	0	1	0
2012	France	WC D1B	3rd	5	1	3	4	0
2013	France	WC D1B	1st	5	1	3	4	0
2014	France	WC D1A	4th	5	1	0	1	2
2017	France	WC D1A	6th	5	0	0	0	2
2018	France	WC D1A	1st	5	0	1	1	2
2019	France	WC	10th	5	0	2	2	2
2022	France	WC D1A	1st	4	0	0	0	2
2023	France	WC	10th	4	1	0	1	0
Junior totals				4	1	0	1	6
Senior totals				52	6	10	16	12

== Awards and honors ==
Award	Year
International
World Championship D1B Best Defenseman	2013
World Championship Top-3 Player on Team	2019
Naisten Liiga/Auroraliiga
All-Star Second Team	2021
Finnish Championship Bronze Medal	2021
Finnish Championship Silver Medal	2022
Aurora Borealis Cup Champion	2023, 2024
