= DNB Arena (Stavanger) =

Ice hockey arena in Stavanger, Norway

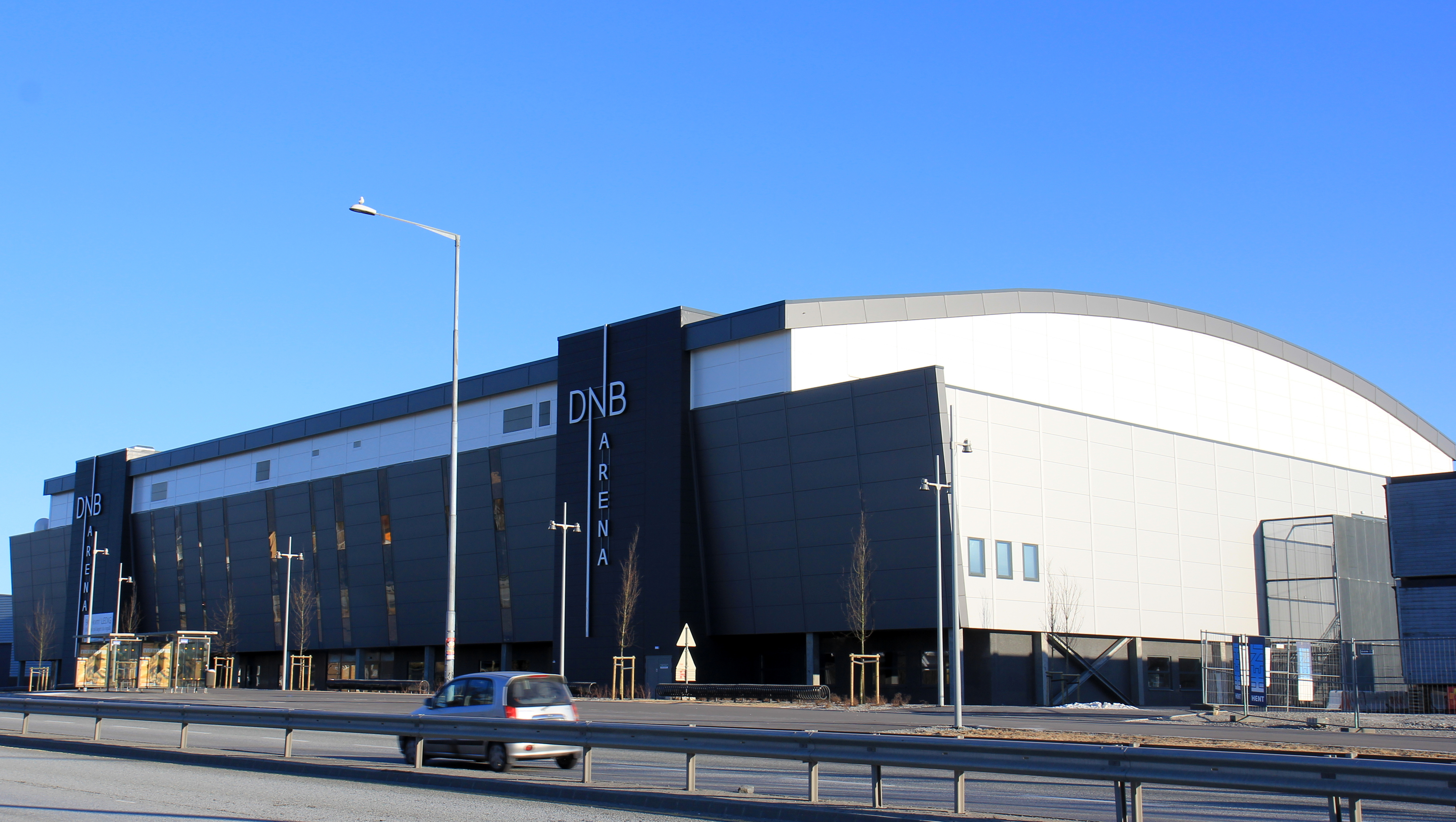
- Interactive map of DNB Arena
- Location: Madla, Stavanger, Norway
- Coordinates: 58°57′14″N 5°41′35″E
- Owner: Stavanger Oilers
- Capacity: 4,377 (ice hockey); 6,000 (concerts)
- Public transit: Bus: Line 2, 3, 6, 7, 16, N84, N86, X73

Construction
- Groundbreaking: 13 May 2011
- Opened: 7 October 2012
- Cost: 210 million kr
- Architect: Arkitektkontoret Jobb
- General contractor: Kruse Smith

Tenants
- Stavanger Oilers (2012–present); 2013 IIHF Women's World Championship Division I 2023 World Women's Handball Championship

DNB Arena is an indoor ice hockey rink in Stavanger, Norway, and home to the EHL team, the Stavanger Oilers. Opened ahead of the 2012–13 season, the arena has a capacity for 4,500 spectators during ice hockey matches and 6,000 during concerts, including 36 executive boxes. The rink is unusual for Norway in that it has the National Hockey League rink size. The 16,500 square meters (178,000 sq ft) building is designed by Arkitektkontoret Jobb and is named for DNB, a Norwegian banking group.

Plans for a new venue to replace the aging Stavanger Ishall were first articulated by club-owner Tore Christiansen in 2006. Construction started in May 2011, with Kruse Smith as the main contractor. Construction cost 210 million Norwegian krone (NOK). The venue is owned by the Oilers' investment company, which receives a combined 9 million per year from DNB and the municipality. The arena hosted group stages of 2012–13 IIHF Continental Cup and 2013 IIHF Women's World Championship Division I. It's currently hosting the 2023 World Women's Handball Championship.

== Construction ==
Plans for a new arena for the Stavanger Oilers was first articulated by club-owner and chairman Tore Christiansen in 2006. By 2007 the Oilers had the highest attendance of any team in the GET-Ligaen, when they reached an average 2,000. The club stated that additional increase would be difficult, especially because seats were all sold to season ticket holders and that terrace spaces were only being sold to top matches.

The city council passed the zoning plan for the arena area on 19 October 2009. However, construction start was delayed after a disagreement arose between the municipality and the arena company regarding the use of commercial areas. Part of the financing comes from NOK 4 million per year over 20 years paid by the municipality for ice time for local clubs. Construction commenced on 13 May 2011 with Kruse Smith as the main contractor. The project was originally named Oilers Arena, but in September 2011 the club signed a ten-year agreement with DNB for the naming rights, worth NOK 5 million per year. The building made of prefabricated elements manufactured by Spenncon. Construction cost NOK 210 million.

Ahead of the 2012–13 season, the Oilers sold 3,000 season tickets. The arena was inaugurated with an Oilers training session on 1 October. Stavanger Municipal Council gave, against the votes of the Christian Democratic Party and the Socialist Left Party, a temporary permission to serve alcoholic beverages at matches. The team stated that they hoped this would pave the way for alcohol service at other sports events in the country. The first match took place on 7 October, with Oilers beating 3–2.

== Facilities ==
DNB Arena is located at Madlaveien, next to the Oilers' old venue Stavanger Ishall (also known as Siddishallen). The area has a capacity for 4,500 spectators during ice hockey matches and 6,000 during concerts, including 36 executive boxes. The rink measures 26 by 60 metres (85 by 197 ft), the standard for the National Hockey League and narrower than the standard of the International Ice Hockey Federation, which is normally used in Norway. The structure has a floor area of 16,500 square meters (178,000 sq ft) and was designed by Arkitektkontoret Jobb. It is named for DNB, a Norwegian banking group.

Seats are softened with textiles and the club has chosen to not color the venue in their team colors to keep focus on the playing field and make it easier for the venue to be used for other events. The sound system cost NOK 8 million and was delivered by Bose and Electrocompaniet. The concessionaires do not accept cash; only cards and prepaid cashless systems are accepted.

== Events ==
Oilers hosted Group E of the 2012–13 IIHF Continental Cup. Played between 23 and 25 November, the group was contested between Oilers, Belarus' Metallurg Zhlobin, Poland's KH Sanok and the winner of Group C, Beibarys Atyrau. The venue is scheduled to host Group A of the 2013 IIHF Women's World Championship Division I between 7 and 14 April. In addition to Norway, the tournament will feature Austria, Denmark, Japan, Latvia and Slovakia. Scheduled concerts are Brad Paisley on 11 November 2012 and Mark Knopfler on 13 June 2013. The venue will along with other halls be used to host future Offshore Northern Seas trade fairs.

It hosted group stages of the 2013 IIHF Women's World Championship Division I and the 2023 World Women's Handball Championship.

== See also ==
- List of indoor arenas in Norway
- List of indoor ice rinks in Norway
