= Espoo Metro Areena =

Multi-purpose stadium in Espoo, Finland

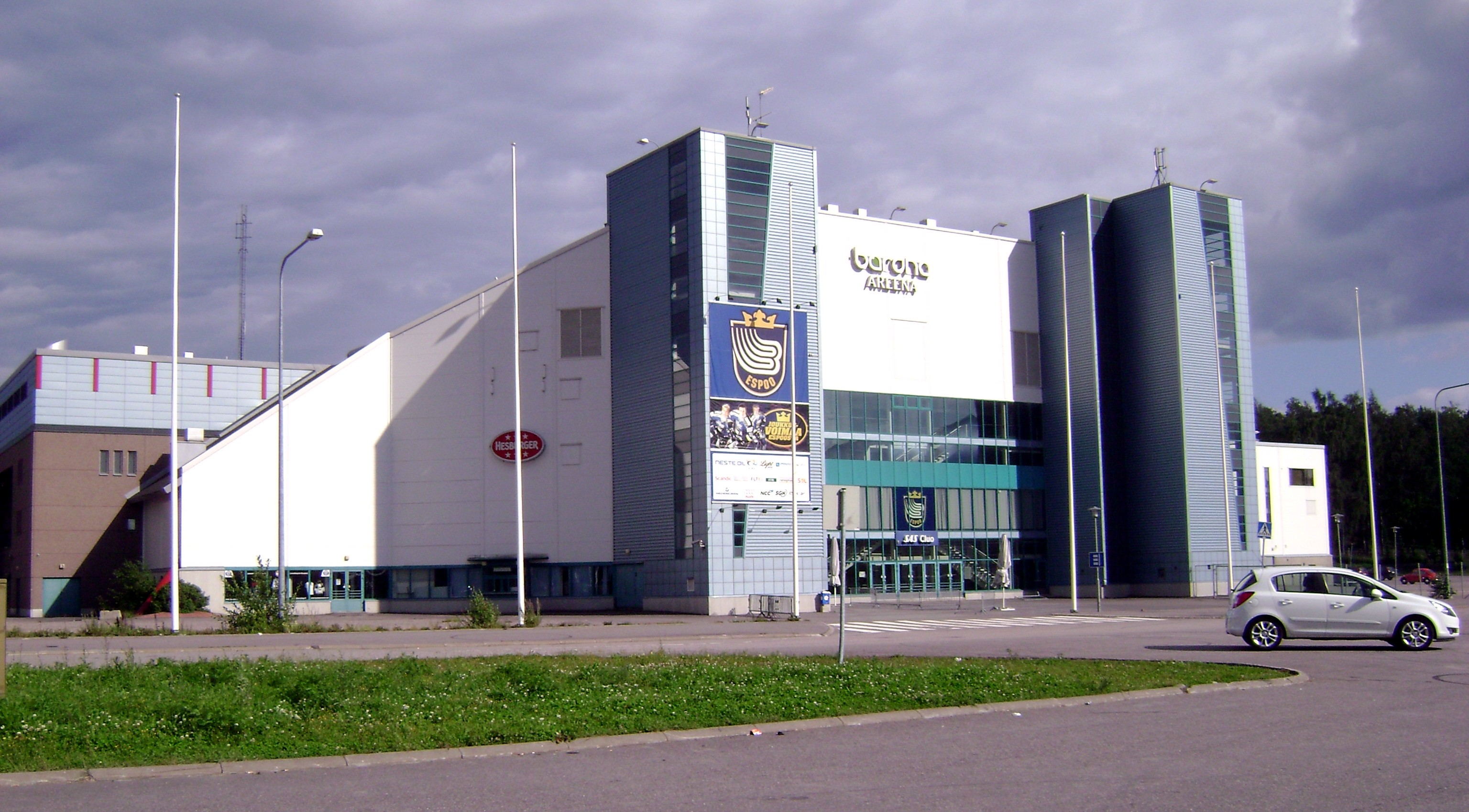
- Exterior in August 2009
- Interactive map of Espoo Metro Areena
- Former names: LänsiAuto Areena (1999–2009); Barona Areena (2009–2015)
- Address: Urheilupuistontie 3, 02120 Espoo
- Location: Espoo, Finland
- Coordinates: 60°10′40″N 24°47′09″E
- Owner: Tapiolan Monitoimiareena Oy
- Capacity: 6,982 (ice hockey); 8,000 (concerts)
- Public transit: M1 Urheilupuisto metro station

Construction
- Opened: January 1999
- Expanded: 2015
- Architect: Matti Savolainen Oy

Tenants
- Espoo Blues (ice hockey) (1999–2016); Espoo United (basketball) (2016–18); Espoo United (ice hockey) (2016–18); Finland men's national basketball team (2018–present); Kiekko-Espoo (ice hockey) (2019–present)

Espoo Metro Areena (known from 1999 to January 2009 as LänsiAuto Areena, and from 2009 to October 2015 as Barona Areena) is an arena in the Tapiola District of Espoo, Finland. The arena is part of the Tapiolan Urheilupuisto (Tapiola Sports Park). It was inaugurated in 1999 and holds 6,982 people for ice-hockey games or up to 8,000 for concerts.

== Events ==
Espoo Metro Areena has been primarily used for ice hockey and it was the home arena of Liiga team Espoo Blues from 1999 to 2016 and of Espoo United of the Mestis from 2016 until the franchise was dissolved in 2018. Kiekko-Espoo moved to the arena in 2019. The 2019 IIHF Women's World Championship of ice hockey took place at the arena.

The arena hosted Uuden Musiikin Kilpailu, Finland's national selection process for the Eurovision Song Contest, in 2013, 2014, 2017 and 2018.

The arena served as the leading venue for the 2022 World Ringette Championships. The 2023 European Figure Skating Championships were hosted at the arena in January 2023. The arena also hosted an ISU Grand Prix of figure skating event in 2022 and 2023.

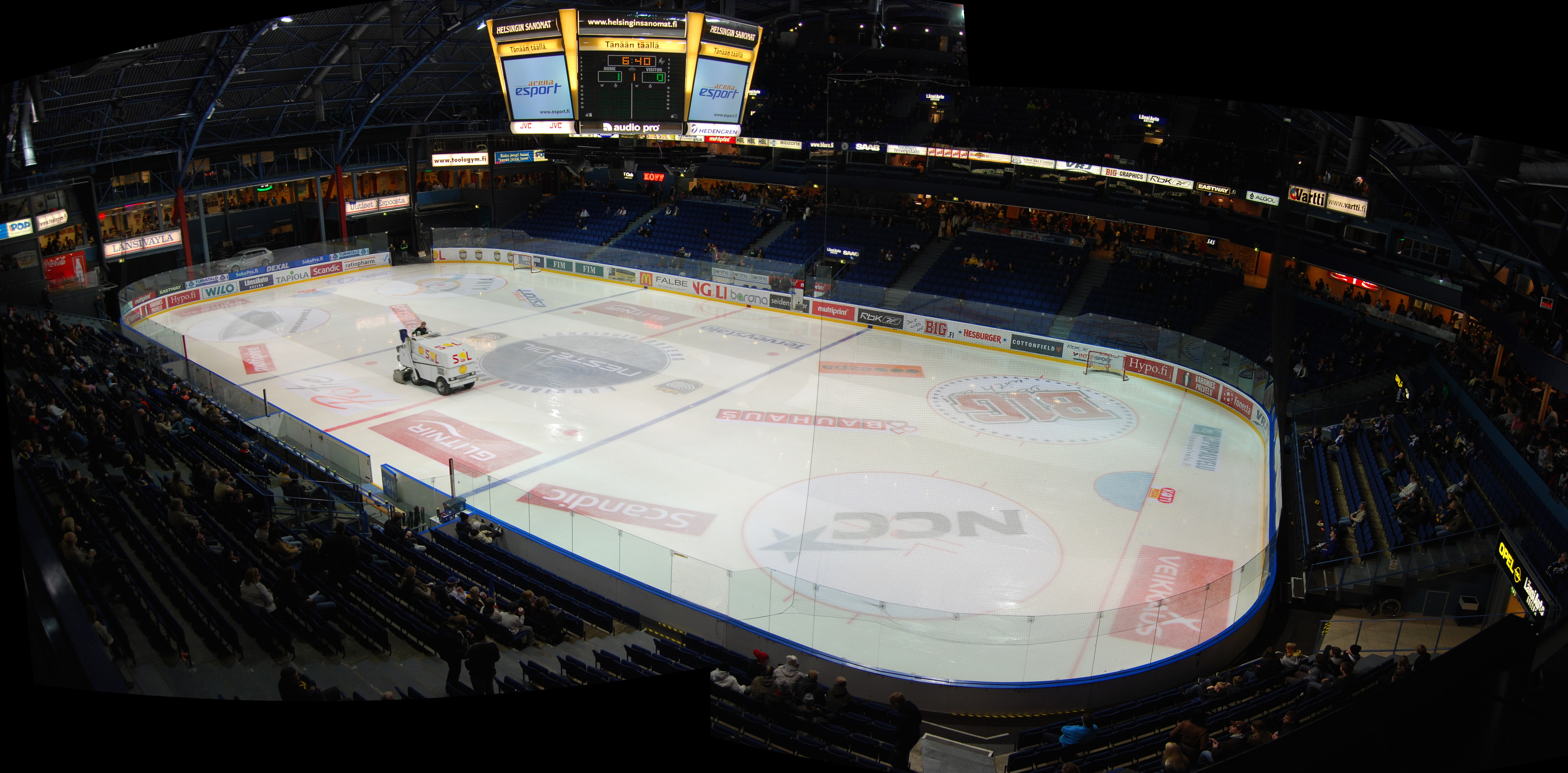
Interior of the arena in October 2008.

Various concerts and esports events have also been held at the arena. Counter-Strike tournament Elisa Masters Espoo took place at the arena in 2022 and 2023.

In 2027, it is set to be one of the venues for FIBA Women's EuroBasket jointly held by Belgium, Finland, Sweden and Lithuania.

== See also ==
- List of indoor arenas in Finland
- List of indoor arenas in Nordic countries
