= Marion Allemoz =

French ice hockey player

- Born: 4 July 1989 (age 36) Chambéry, France
- Height: 169 cm (5 ft 7 in)
- Weight: 73 kg (161 lb; 11 st 7 lb)
- Position: Forward
- Shot: Right
- Played for: Les Canadiennes de Montréal; Montreal Carabins; Neuilly-sur-Marne; Modo Hockey
- National team: France
- Playing career: 2007–2022

Marion Allemoz (born 4 July 1989) is a French retired professional ice hockey forward. She was the first French player to play professional women's ice hockey in North America as a member of Les Canadiennes de Montréal of the Canadian Women's Hockey League (CWHL) from 2016 to 2018.

== Playing career ==
=== Early career ===
Allemoz played on boys' teams in Chambéry, France, until she was 18 along with her four siblings, being coached by her older sister.

=== CIS ===
In 2011, she left France to become the first French player to play ice hockey at the Canadian Interuniversity Sport level. She would go on to win two national championships in 2013 and 2016 with the Montreal Carabins women's ice hockey program, putting up 62 points across 84 CIS games.

At the 2013 CIS national women's ice hockey championships, Allemoz would score the Carabins’ second goal of the gold medal game against goaltender Amanda Tapp, an eventual 3–2 final against the Calgary Dinos.

During the 2014–15 season, Allemoz was one of three members of the French national team competing for the program. She was joined by Lore Baudrit and Emmanuelle Passard. Heading into the 2015–16 season, Allemoz was bestowed the honor of the Carabins’ team captaincy. By season's end, the Carabins would capture their second national title in program history, as Allemoz earned an assist in the gold medal game, an 8–0 final against the UBC Thunderbirds.

=== Professional ===
She was drafted 24th overall by Les Canadiennes de Montreal at the 2016 CWHL Draft. After graduating, she signed her first professional contract with the club, the first French national to play in the CWHL. She up 16 points in 47 games with the club from 2016 to 2018, winning the 2017 Clarkson Cup.

In 2018, she signed with Modo Hockey in Sweden. She scored 21 points in 33 games in the 2019–20 season, leading the team in points and serving as an alternate captain as it finished in ninth place, being forced into the relegation playoffs for the first time in team history. She scored the first hattrick of the 2020–21 SDHL season in Modo's opening match against Göteborg HC.

=== International ===
Allemoz made her senior debut for the French national team at the 2007 IIHF Women's World Championship Division I. She was made national team captain after the 2009 IIHF Women's World Championship Division I, where the country failed to win any games and was relegated despite her scoring 7 points in 5 games. She would lead the team to promotion back to Division I – which had been renamed Division 1A in 2011 – in the 2013 IIHF Women's World Championship Division I and was named best forward of the tournament by the directorate, scoring 10 points in 5 games.

Allemoz would win a bronze medal in Group A play at the 2015 IIHF Women's World Championship Division I tournament. Of note, the event was hosted in her native France (in the city of Rouen). Allemoz would accumulate seven points during the tournament.

She scored 7 points in 6 games in the qualification tournament for the 2018 Winter Olympics, but France failed to qualify. The country would, however, finish in first place at the 2018 IIHF Women's World Championship Division I, earning promotion to the IIHF Women's World Championship Top Division for the first time. She would pick up 2 points in 5 games as the country finished in tenth place at the 2019 IIHF Women's World Championship and was relegated back to Division 1A.

== Personal life ==
Allemoz has a degree in criminology from the Université de Montréal.

== Career statistics ==
			Regular season					Playoffs
Season	Team	League	GP	G	A	Pts	PIM	GP	G	A	Pts	PIM
2016-17	Les Canadiennes de Montréal	CWHL	19	1	2	3	8	–	–	–	–	–
2017-18	Les Canadiennes de Montréal	CWHL	28	4	9	13	4	2	0	1	1	0
2018-19	Modo Hockey	SDHL	28	13	10	23	10	6	0	1	1	2
2019-20	Modo Hockey	SDHL	33	10	11	21	12	–	–	–	–	–
2020-21	Modo Hockey	SDHL	36	12	12	24	12	2	1	0	1	2
CWHL totals			47	5	11	16	12	2	0	1	1	0
SDHL totals			97	35	33	68	34	8	1	1	2	4

== Awards and honours ==
- 2013 IIHF Women's World Championship Division I Best Forward
- 2014 RSEQ Second Team All-Star
