= ČEZ Stadion =

Ice hockey stadium in Czechia

- Interactive map of ČEZ Stadion
- Former names: Zimní stadion
- Location: Hokejových legend 2531, Kladno, Czech Republic 272 01
- Coordinates: 50.1371125°N 14.0930986°E
- Owner: Kladno
- Capacity: 5,200
- Field size: 26 m × 59.5 m (85 ft × 195 ft)

Construction
- Opened: 1949
- Renovated: 1959, 2001–2002, 2014, 2022

Tenants
- Rytíři Kladno, SK Velc Žilina

ČEZ Stadion is an indoor sporting arena located in Kladno, Czech Republic. The capacity of the arena is 5,200 people. It is currently home to the Rytíři Kladno ice hockey team. The arena, which is owned by the city of Kladno, opened in 1949, and the roof was completed in 1959.
