= Azusa Nakaoku =

Japanese ice hockey player

- Born: May 17, 1985 (age 41) Tomakomai, Japan
- Height: 5 ft 2 in (157 cm)
- Weight: 117 lb (53 kg; 8 st 5 lb)
- Position: Goaltender
- Shoots: Right
- National team: Japan
- Playing career: 2002–present

Azusa Nakaoku (中奥 梓) (born May 17, 1985, in Tomakomai, Japan) is a Japanese ice hockey goaltender.

== International career ==
Nakaoku was selected for the Japan women's national ice hockey team in the 2014 Winter Olympics. She did not play, though she did dress and sit on the bench in one game.

Nakaoku also played for Japan in the qualifying event for the 2014 and 2010 Winter Olympics.

As of 2015, Nakaoku has also appeared for Japan at seven IIHF Women's World Championships, with the first in 2003.

== Career statistics ==
=== International career ===
Through 2014–15 season

Year	Team	Event	GP	W	L	MIN	GA	SO	GAA	SV%
2003	Japan	WW DI	2	0	0	20	0	0	0.00	1.000
2005	Japan	WW DI	3	2	1	178	4	1	1.34	.940
2007	Japan	WW DI	3	3	0	180	2	2	0.67	0.946
2008	Japan	WW	3	1	2	179	8	0	2.67	0.910
2008	Japan	OlyQ	2	1	1	119	4	0	2.02	.900
2009	Japan	WW	4	1	3	208	11	0	3.17	0.925
2012	Japan	WW DIA	4	3	1	240	8	1	2.00	0.941
2013	Japan	OlyQ	3	2	1	185	4	1	1.30	0.938
2013	Japan	WW DIA	5	4	1	7	2	305	1.38	0.933
