= Espoo United (basketball) =

- Founded: 2016; 9 years ago
- History: Espoo United (2016–present)
- Arena: Espoo Metro Areena
- Capacity: 6,982
- Location: Espoo, Finland
- Website: www.espoounited.fi
| Home | Away |

Espoo United is a professional basketball club based in Espoo, Finland. The team is part of the multi-sports club Espoo, which also had an ice hockey section. The club was founded in 2016 and entered the first division Korisliiga in 2017.

However, despite a first season in the top tier, the club was expelled due to financial irregularities.

== Season by season ==
| Season | Tier | League | Pos |
|---|---|---|---|
| 2016–17 | 2 | First Division A | 1st |
| 2017–18 | 1 | Korisliiga | 9th (Note: Expelled from the league.) |
