= Caroline Baldin =

French ice hockey player

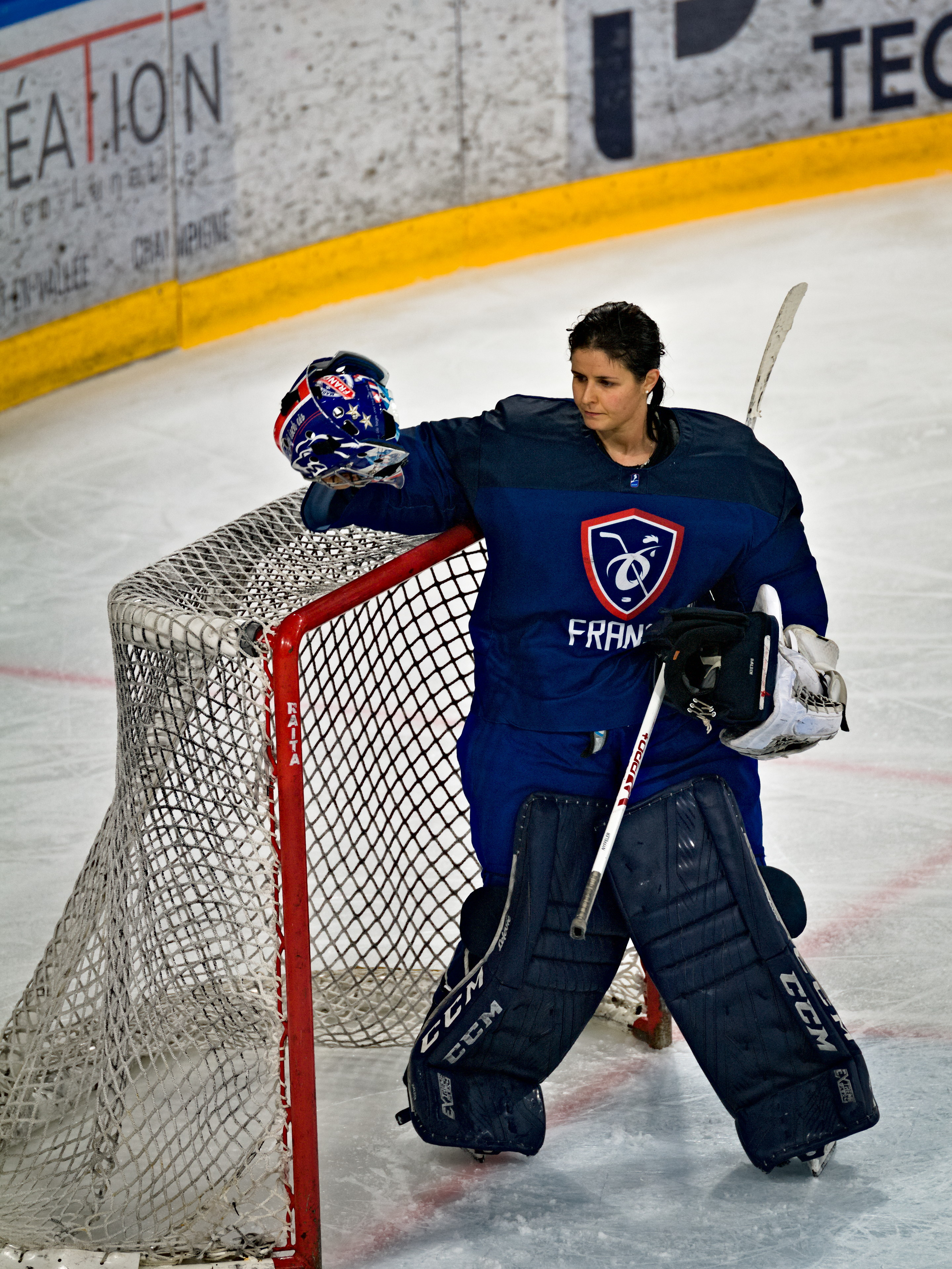
- Born: 14 March 1993 (age 32); Saint-Martin-d'Hères, France
- Height: 1.67 m (5 ft 6 in)
- Weight: 72 kg (159 lb; 11 st 5 lb)
- Position: Goaltender
- Catches: Left
- NLA team Former teams: ZSC Lions; Pôle France Féminin
- National team: France
- Playing career: 2009–present

Caroline Baldin (born 14 March 1993) is a French ice hockey player for the ZSC Lions and the French national team.

She represented France at the 2019 IIHF Women's World Championship.
