= 2021 IIHF U18 Women's World Championship =

2021 IIHF Ice Hockey U18 Women's World Championship

Tournament details
- Host country: Sweden
- Venues: 2 (in 2 host cities)
- Dates: 5–12 January 2021 (cancelled)
- Teams: 8

The 2021 IIHF U18 Women's World Championship was scheduled to be the 14th Women's U18 World Championship in ice hockey.

On 17 September 2020, all tournaments were cancelled by the IIHF due to the COVID-19 pandemic.

== Top Division ==
=== Preliminary round ===
All times are local (UTC+1).

==== Group A ====
Pos	Team	Pld	W	OTW	OTL	L	GF	GA	GD	Pts	Qualification
1	Canada	0	0	0	0	0	0	0	0	0	Semifinals
2	Finland	0	0	0	0	0	0	0	0	0	Semifinals
3	Russia	0	0	0	0	0	0	0	0	0	Quarterfinals
4	United States	0	0	0	0	0	0	0	0	0	Quarterfinals

Rules for classification: 1) points; 2) head-to-head points; 3) head-to-head goal difference; 4) head-to-head number of goals scored; 5) result against closest best-ranked team outside tied teams; 6) result against second-best ranked team outside tied teams; 7) seeding before tournament.

==== Group B ====
Pos	Team	Pld	W	OTW	OTL	L	GF	GA	GD	Pts	Qualification
1	Czech Republic	0	0	0	0	0	0	0	0	0	Quarterfinals
2	Germany	0	0	0	0	0	0	0	0	0	Quarterfinals
3	Sweden (H)	0	0	0	0	0	0	0	0	0	Relegation round
4	Switzerland	0	0	0	0	0	0	0	0	0	Relegation round

Rules for classification: 1) points; 2) head-to-head points; 3) head-to-head goal difference; 4) head-to-head number of goals scored; 5) result against closest best-ranked team outside tied teams; 6) result against second-best ranked team outside tied teams; 7) seeding before tournament.
(H) Host

== Division I ==
=== Group A ===
The tournament would have been held in Győr, Hungary from 10 to 16 January 2021.

- France
- Hungary
- Italy
- Japan
- Norway – Promoted from Division I B
- Slovakia – Relegated from Top Division

=== Group B ===
The tournament would have been held in Radenthein, Austria from 10 to 16 January 2021.

- Austria
- China
- Chinese Taipei – Promoted from Division II A
- Denmark – Relegated from Division I A
- Poland
- South Korea

== Division II ==
=== Group A ===
The tournament would have been held in Dumfries, Great Britain from 19 to 22 January 2021.

- Great Britain – Relegated from Division I B
- Netherlands
- Spain – Promoted from Division II B

=== Group B ===
The tournament would have been held in İzmit, Turkey from 28 to 31 January 2021.

- Kazakhstan – Relegated from Division II A
- Latvia
- Mexico
- Turkey
