= 2019 IIHF U18 Women's World Championship Division I =

Women's ice hockey tournament

2019 IIHF World Women's U18 Championship Division I
Tournament details
- Host countries: Austria; United Kingdom; Spain
- Venues: 3 (in 3 host cities)
- Dates: 7–13 January 2019; 6–12 January 2019; 12–18 January 2019
- Teams: 19

The 2019 IIHF U18 Women's World Championship Division I was three international under-18 women's ice hockey tournaments organized by the International Ice Hockey Federation (IIHF). Divisions I A, I B and I B Qualification represent the second, the third and the fourth tier of competition at the 2019 IIHF World Women's U18 Championship.

== Group A tournament ==
2019 IIHF World Women's U18 Championship Division I A

Tournament details
- Host country: Austria
- City: Radenthein
- Venue: 1 (in 1 host city)
- Dates: 7–13 January 2019
- Teams: 6

Official website
- www.iihf.com

The Division I Group A tournament was played in Radenthein, Austria, from 7 to 13 January 2019.

=== Participating teams ===
Team	Qualification
Germany	8th place in 2018 World Championship Top Division and were relegated
Slovakia	2nd place in 2018 World Championship Division I A
Italy	3rd place in 2018 World Championship Division I A
Austria	Hosts; 4th place in 2018 World Championship Division I A
Hungary	5th place in 2018 World Championship Division I A
Denmark	1st place in 2018 World Championship Division I B and were promoted

=== Final standings ===
Pos	Team	Pld	W	OTW	OTL	L	GF	GA	GD	Pts	Promotion or relegation
1	Slovakia	5	4	0	0	1	14	9	+5	12	Promoted to the 2020 Top Division
2	Germany	5	3	1	0	1	21	8	+13	11	
3	Hungary	5	3	0	1	1	13	9	+4	10	
4	Italy	5	1	1	1	2	9	16	−7	6	
5	Denmark	5	1	0	1	3	9	15	−6	4	
6	Austria (H)	5	0	1	0	4	3	12	−9	2	Relegated to the 2020 Division I B

Source: IIHF
Rules for classification: 1) points; 2) head-to-head points; 3) head-to-head goal difference; 4) head-to-head number of goals scored; 5) result against closest best-ranked team outside tied teams; 6) result against second-best ranked team outside tied teams; 7) seeding before tournament.
(H) Host

=== Results ===
7 January 2019; 12:30	Hungary	4–1 (1–1, 1–0, 2–0)	Italy	Nockhalle, Radenthein

Game reference

7 January 2019; 16:00	Denmark	1–5 (0–4, 1–1, 0–0)	Germany	Nockhalle, Radenthein

Game reference

7 January 2019; 19:30	Austria	0–1 (0–1, 0–0, 0–0)	Slovakia	Nockhalle, Radenthein

Game reference

8 January 2019; 12:30	Italy	3–2 OT (1–0, 1–2, 0–0) (1–0)	Denmark	Nockhalle, Radenthein

Game reference

8 January 2019; 16:00	Slovakia	3–2 (0–1, 0–1, 3–0)	Hungary	Nockhalle, Radenthein

Game reference

8 January 2019; 19:30	Germany	5–0 (0–0, 2–0, 3–0)	Austria	Nockhalle, Radenthein

Game reference

10 January 2019; 12:30	Germany	3–2 OT (0–0, 1–1, 1–1) (1–0)	Hungary	Nockhalle, Radenthein

Game reference

10 January 2019; 16:00	Slovakia	2–5 (0–1, 0–1, 2–3)	Italy	Nockhalle, Radenthein

Game reference

10 January 2019; 19:30	Denmark	4–1 (2–0, 1–1, 1–0)	Austria	Nockhalle, Radenthein

Game reference

12 January 2019; 12:30	Slovakia	3–1 (1–0, 1–1, 1–0)	Denmark	Nockhalle, Radenthein

Game reference

12 January 2019; 16:00	Italy	0–7 (0–2, 0–3, 0–2)	Germany	Nockhalle, Radenthein

Game reference

12 January 2019; 19:30	Austria	1–2 (1–1, 0–1, 0–0)	Hungary	Nockhalle, Radenthein

Game reference

13 January 2019; 12:30	Germany	1–5 (1–2, 0–0, 0–3)	Slovakia	Nockhalle, Radenthein

Game reference

13 January 2019; 16:00	Hungary	3–1 (1–0, 2–1, 0–0)	Denmark	Nockhalle, Radenthein

Game reference

13 January 2019; 19:30	Italy	0–1 OT (0–0, 0–0, 0–0) (0–1)	Austria	Nockhalle, Radenthein

Game reference

== Group B tournament ==
2019 IIHF World Women's U18 Championship Division I B

Tournament details
- Host country: United Kingdom
- City: Dumfries
- Venue: 1 (in 1 host city)
- Dates: 6–12 January 2019
- Teams: 6

Official website
- www.iihf.com

The Division I Group B tournament was played in Dumfries, United Kingdom, from 6 to 12 January 2019.

=== Participating teams ===
Team	Qualification
Norway	6th place in 2018 World Championship Division I A and were relegated
France	2nd place in 2018 World Championship Division I B
Poland	3rd place in 2018 World Championship Division I B
China	4th place in 2018 World Championship Division I B
Great Britain	Hosts; 5th place in 2018 World Championship Division I B
Netherlands	1st place in 2018 World Championship Division I B Qualification and were promoted

=== Final standings ===
Pos	Team	Pld	W	OTW	OTL	L	GF	GA	GD	Pts	Promotion or relegation
1	France	5	4	0	1	0	18	2	+16	13	Promoted to the 2020 Division I A
2	Norway	5	3	1	1	0	14	4	+10	12	
3	Great Britain (H)	5	2	1	1	1	7	7	0	9	
4	Poland	5	2	1	0	2	12	14	−2	8	
5	China	5	1	0	0	4	6	16	−10	3	
6	Netherlands	5	0	0	0	5	5	19	−14	0	Relegated to the 2020 Division II A

Source: IIHF
Rules for classification: 1) points; 2) head-to-head points; 3) head-to-head goal difference; 4) head-to-head number of goals scored; 5) result against closest best-ranked team outside tied teams; 6) result against second-best ranked team outside tied teams; 7) seeding before tournament.
(H) Host

=== Results ===
6 January 2019; 13:00	China	0–7 (0–5, 0–1, 0–1)	France	Ice Bowl, Dumfries

Game reference

6 January 2019; 16:30	Netherlands	0–4 (0–1, 0–2, 0–1)	Norway	Ice Bowl, Dumfries

Game reference

6 January 2019; 20:00	Great Britain	1–2 OT (0–0, 1–1, 0–0) (0–1)	Poland	Ice Bowl, Dumfries

Game reference

7 January 2019; 13:00	Norway	3–0 (1–0, 2–0, 0–0)	China	Ice Bowl, Dumfries

Game reference

7 January 2019; 16:30	Poland	4–2 (0–1, 1–0, 3–1)	Netherlands	Ice Bowl, Dumfries

Game reference

7 January 2019; 20:00	France	3–0 (2–0, 1–0, 0–0)	Great Britain	Ice Bowl, Dumfries

Game reference

9 January 2019; 13:00	France	4–0 (1–0, 2–0, 1–0)	Poland	Ice Bowl, Dumfries

Game reference

9 January 2019; 16:30	Netherlands	1–4 (0–1, 0–2, 1–1)	China	Ice Bowl, Dumfries

Game reference

9 January 2019; 20:00	Norway	0–1 GWS (0–0, 0–0, 0–0) (0–0, 0–1)	Great Britain	Ice Bowl, Dumfries

Game reference

11 January 2019; 13:00	Poland	2–5 (0–2, 2–1, 0–2)	Norway	Ice Bowl, Dumfries

Game reference

11 January 2019; 16:30	France	3–0 (0–0, 1–0, 2–0)	Netherlands	Ice Bowl, Dumfries

Game reference

11 January 2019; 20:00	China	0–1 (0–0, 0–1, 0–0)	Great Britain	Ice Bowl, Dumfries

Game reference

12 January 2019; 13:00	Norway	2–1 GWS (0–1, 0–0, 1–0) (0–0, 1–0)	France	Ice Bowl, Dumfries

Game reference

12 January 2019; 16:30	Poland	4–2 (2–2, 0–0, 2–0)	China	Ice Bowl, Dumfries

Game reference

12 January 2019; 20:00	Great Britain	4–2 (0–0, 1–0, 3–2)	Netherlands	Ice Bowl, Dumfries

Game reference

== Group B Qualification tournament ==
2019 IIHF World Women's U18 Championship Division I B Qualification

Tournament details
- Host country: Spain
- City: Jaca
- Venue: 1 (in 1 host city)
- Dates: 12–18 January 2019
- Teams: 7

Official website
- www.iihf.com

The Division I Group B Qualification tournament was played in Jaca, Spain, from 12 to 18 January 2019.

=== Participating teams ===
Team	Qualification
Australia	6th place in 2018 World Championship Division I B and were relegated
Mexico	2nd place in 2018 World Championship Division I B Qualification
Spain	Hosts; 3rd place in 2018 World Championship Division I B Qualification
Kazakhstan	4th place in 2018 World Championship Division I B Qualification
Turkey	5th place in 2018 World Championship Division I B Qualification
South Korea	first participation in World Championship
Chinese Taipei	first participation in World Championship

=== Preliminary round ===
==== Group A ====
Pos	Team	Pld	W	OTW	OTL	L	GF	GA	GD	Pts	Qualification
1	Kazakhstan	2	2	0	0	0	20	1	+19	6	Semifinals
2	Australia	2	1	0	0	1	7	5	+2	3	Semifinals
3	Turkey	2	0	0	0	2	0	21	−21	0	5th–7th place playoffs

Source: IIHF
Rules for classification: 1) points; 2) head-to-head points; 3) head-to-head goal difference; 4) head-to-head number of goals scored; 5) result against closest best-ranked team outside tied teams; 6) result against second-best ranked team outside tied teams; 7) seeding before tournament.

12 January 2019; 16:30	Kazakhstan	15–0 (8–0, 2–0, 5–0)	Turkey	Pabellón de Hielo, Jaca

Game reference

13 January 2019; 13:00	Turkey	0–6 (0–2, 0–1, 0–3)	Australia	Pabellón de Hielo, Jaca

Game reference

15 January 2019; 16:30	Australia	1–5 (1–1, 0–2, 0–2)	Kazakhstan	Pabellón de Hielo, Jaca

Game reference

==== Group B ====
Pos	Team	Pld	W	OTW	OTL	L	GF	GA	GD	Pts	Qualification
1	South Korea	3	3	0	0	0	12	2	+10	9	Semifinals
2	Chinese Taipei	3	1	1	0	1	10	11	−1	5	Semifinals
3	Spain (H)	3	1	0	1	1	6	5	+1	4	5th–7th place playoffs
4	Mexico	3	0	0	0	3	2	12	−10	0	5th–7th place playoffs

Source: IIHF
Rules for classification: 1) points; 2) head-to-head points; 3) head-to-head goal difference; 4) head-to-head number of goals scored; 5) result against closest best-ranked team outside tied teams; 6) result against second-best ranked team outside tied teams; 7) seeding before tournament.
(H) Host

12 January 2019; 13:00	Mexico	2–4 (0–1, 1–3, 1–0)	Chinese Taipei	Pabellón de Hielo, Jaca

Game reference

12 January 2019; 20:15	Spain	0–1 (0–1, 0–0, 0–0)	South Korea	Pabellón de Hielo, Jaca

Game reference

13 January 2019; 16:30	South Korea	5–0 (3–0, 1–0, 1–0)	Mexico	Pabellón de Hielo, Jaca

Game reference

13 January 2019; 20:00	Spain	3–4 OT (1–2, 2–0, 0–1) (0–1)	Chinese Taipei	Pabellón de Hielo, Jaca

Game reference

15 January 2019; 13:00	Chinese Taipei	2–6 (0–2, 1–3, 1–1)	South Korea	Pabellón de Hielo, Jaca

Game reference

15 January 2019; 20:00	Mexico	0–3 (0–2, 0–1, 0–0)	Spain	Pabellón de Hielo, Jaca

Game reference

=== 5th–7th place playoffs ===
5th−7th place semifinal
16 January
Turkey	1
Mexico	0

5th place match
18 January
Turkey	0
Spain	7

==== 5th−7th place semifinal ====
16 January 2019; 13:00	Turkey	1–0 (0–0, 1–0, 0–0)	Mexico	Pabellón de Hielo, Jaca

Game reference

==== 5th place match ====
18 January 2019; 13:00	Turkey	0–7 (0–2, 0–2, 0–3)	Spain	Pabellón de Hielo, Jaca

Game reference

=== Championship playoffs ===
Semifinals
16 January
Kazakhstan	3
Chinese Taipei	1
16 January
South Korea	5
Australia	2

Final
18 January
Kazakhstan	3
South Korea (GWS)	4
3rd place match
18 January
Chinese Taipei	6
Australia	2

==== Semifinals ====
16 January 2019; 16:30	South Korea	5–2 (2–0, 2–1, 1–1)	Australia	Pabellón de Hielo, Jaca

Game reference

16 January 2019; 20:00	Kazakhstan	3–1 (1–0, 0–0, 2–1)	Chinese Taipei	Pabellón de Hielo, Jaca

Game reference

==== 3rd place match ====
18 January 2019; 16:30	Chinese Taipei	6–2 (4–0, 0–2, 2–0)	Australia	Pabellón de Hielo, Jaca

Game reference

==== Final ====
18 January 2019; 20:00	Kazakhstan	3–4 GWS (1–1, 0–0, 2–2) (0–0, 0–1)	South Korea	Pabellón de Hielo, Jaca

Game reference

=== Group standings ===
Pos	Team	Pld	W	OTW	OTL	L	GF	GA	GD	Pts	Promotion or relegation
1	South Korea	5	4	1	0	0	21	7	+14	14	Promoted to the 2020 Division I B
2	Kazakhstan	4	3	0	1	0	26	6	+20	10	
3	Chinese Taipei	5	2	1	0	2	17	16	+1	8	
4	Australia	4	1	0	0	3	11	16	−5	3	
5	Spain (H)	4	2	0	1	1	13	5	+8	7	
6	Turkey	4	1	0	0	3	1	28	−27	3	
7	Mexico	4	0	0	0	4	2	13	−11	0	

Rules for classification: 1) points; 2) head-to-head points; 3) head-to-head goal difference; 4) head-to-head number of goals scored; 5) result against closest best-ranked team outside tied teams; 6) result against second-best ranked team outside tied teams; 7) seeding before tournament.
(H) Host
