= 2025 IIHF U18 Women's World Championship Division I =

International youth ice hockey tournament

Tournament details
- Host countries: Hungary; Poland
- Venues: 2 (in 2 host cities)
- Dates: 5–11 January 2025; 7–13 January 2025
- Teams: 12

The 2025 IIHF U18 Women's World Championship Division I consisted of two international under-18 women's ice hockey tournaments organized by the International Ice Hockey Federation (IIHF). Division I A represented the second tier and Division I B the third tier of the IIHF U18 Women's World Championship.

== Group A tournament ==
2025 IIHF U18 Women's World Championship Division I Group A

Tournament details
- Host country: Hungary
- City: Budapest
- Venue: 1 (in 1 host city)
- Dates: 5–11 January 2025
- Teams: 6

Tournament statistics
- Games played: 15
- Goals scored: 68 (4.53 per game)
- Attendance: 3,229 (215 per game)
- Scoring leader: (Italy) Manuela Heidenberger (8 points)

Official website
- www.iihf.com

The Division I Group A tournament was played in Budapest, Hungary, from 5 to 11 January 2025.

=== Participating teams ===
Team	Qualification
Germany	Placed 8th in Top Division last year and were relegated
Italy	Placed 2nd in Division I A last year
Hungary	Hosts; placed 3rd in Division I A last year
Austria	Placed 4th in Division I A last year
France	Placed 5th in Division I A last year
Norway	Placed 1st in Division I B last year and were promoted

=== Standings ===
Pos	Team	Pld	W	OTW	OTL	L	GF	GA	GD	Pts	Promotion or relegation
1	Hungary (H)	5	5	0	0	0	13	2	+11	15	Promoted to the 2026 Top Division
2	Italy	5	4	0	0	1	12	9	+3	12	
3	Germany	5	2	0	0	3	12	12	0	6	
4	Norway	5	1	1	0	3	12	15	−3	5	
5	France	5	1	0	1	3	10	16	−6	4	
6	Austria	5	0	1	1	3	9	14	−5	3	Relegated to the 2026 Division I B

Source: IIHF
Rules for classification: 1) points; 2) head-to-head points; 3) head-to-head goal difference; 4) head-to-head number of goals scored; 5) result against closest best-ranked team outside tied teams; 6) result against second-best ranked team outside tied teams; 7) seeding before tournament.
(H) Host

=== Match results ===
All times are local (Central European Time – UTC+1).

5 January 2025; 12:30	Austria	3–4 (0–1, 1–1, 2–2)	Italy	Tüskecsarnok, Budapest; Attendance: 91

Game reference

Kiara Matt
Goalies
Anna Corte Sualon
Referee:
(Slovakia) Janka Chamulová
Linesmen:
(Hungary) Bernadett Holzer
(Netherlands) Britt Kosters

	0–1	19:35 – Bedont (Fantin) (PP)
	0–2	31:08 – Heidenberger (Fantin)
Lintner (Tekin, Schloglmann) – 35:17	1–2
	1–3	41:35 – Heidenberger (Innocenti, Fantin)
	1–4	48:15 – Pinti (Heidenberger, Bedont) (PP)
Picka (Schloglmann) – 49:00	2–4
Lintner (Picka) (PP) – 53:47	3–4

14 min
Penalties
14 min
26
Shots
27

5 January 2025; 16:00	Norway	2–4 (0–1, 1–3, 1–0)	Germany	Tüskecsarnok, Budapest; Attendance: 77

Game reference

Shiva Nobari
Goalies
Tara Bach
Referee:
(Latvia) Sarma Pone
Linesmen:
(Latvia) Baiba Gvozdeva
(Hungary) Adrienn Paulheim

	0–1	14:20 – Betten (Manns, Georgi)
	0–2	23:38 – Birka (Boico, Manns) (PP)
	0–3	26:09 – Stellet (Spagert)
Bråten – 28:45	1–3
	1–4	31:41 – Seyrer (Weichenhain, Poindl) (PP)
Bråten (Rise Moe, Austefjord) – 45:35	2–4

10 min
Penalties
2 min
32
Shots
24

5 January 2025; 19:30	France	1–3 (1–1, 0–0, 0–2)	Hungary	Tüskecsarnok, Budapest; Attendance: 347

Game reference

Liv Wegmuller
Goalies
Noémi Takács
Referee:
(Germany) Svenja Strohmenger
Linesmen:
(Canada) Joanie Duchesneau
(Austria) Hanna-Sophie Wacik

	0–1	03:21 – Koncz (Mozolai, Hajdú) (PP)
Chabert (Raigneau, Boudin) – 18:58	1–1
	1–2	40:33 – Hiezl (Polónyi, Szabó)
	1–3	51:14 – Heizl (Weiler, Kornyilov)

4 min
Penalties
4 min
24
Shots
30

6 January 2025; 12:30	Germany	4–1 (0–1, 3–0, 1–0)	Austria	Tüskecsarnok, Budapest; Attendance: 70

Game reference

Hannah Loist
Goalies
Kiara Matt
Referee:
(Canada) Marie-Ève Couture
Linesmen:
(Canada) Joanie Duchesneau
(Hungary) Adrienn Paulheim

	0–1	11:08 – Picka (Tekin)
Poindl (Seyrer, Georgi) (PP) – 22:43	1–1
Boico (Georgi, Butuzov) – 27:18	2–1
Boico (Butuzov) – 32:40	3–1
Boico (Birka, Butuzov) – 57:17	4–1

2 min
Penalties
6 min
24
Shots
28

6 January 2025; 16:00	Italy	3–1 (0–0, 1–0, 2–1)	France	Tüskecsarnok, Budapest; Attendance: 38

Game reference

Anna Corte Sualon
Goalies
Liv Wegmuller
Referee:
(South Korea) Chae Young-jin
Linesmen:
(Croatia) Marko Šaković
(Poland) Michal Zak

Fantin (Bedont, Heidenberger) – 35:28	1–0
	1–1	42:28 – Chabert (Bernoussi)
Heidenberger (Fantin, Bedont) – 48:28	2–1
Giuliani (EN) – 58:59	3–1

6 min
Penalties
4 min
32
Shots
30

6 January 2025; 19:30	Hungary	3–0 (0–0, 1–0, 2–0)	Norway	Tüskecsarnok, Budapest; Attendance: 247

Game reference

Helga Milibak
Goalies
Tuva Are-Ekström
Referee:
(Latvia) Sarna Pone
Linesmen:
(Latvia) Baiba Gvozdeva
(Netherlands) Britt Kosters

Weiler (Hiezl, Polónyi) – 34:52	1–0
Koncz (Kornyilov, Weiler) – 47:13	2–0
Weiler (Polónyi, Hiezl) – 54:09	3–0

4 min
Penalties
6 min
17
Shots
38

8 January 2025; 12:30	Norway	4–3 OT (1–3, 1–0, 1–0) (OT: 1–0)	Austria	Tüskecsarnok, Budapest; Attendance: 61

Game reference

Tuva Are-Ekström
Goalies
Kiara Matt
Referee:
(Slovakia) Janka Chamulová
Linesmen:
(Hungary) Bernadett Holzer
(Hungary) Adrienn Paulheim

	0–1	09:07 – Picka (Rumpl, Tekin)
	0–2	12:40 – Lintner (Picka)
	0–3	14:52 – Ostadal (Rumpl, Lintner)
Arntzen (Toet-Uddveg) – 16:10	1–3
Fredriksen (Arntzen, Dahlstrøm) (PP) – 39:13	2–3
Toet-Uddveg (Bråten) (EA) – 59:56	3–3
Bråten (Arntzen, Simensen) – 61:04	4–3

10 min
Penalties
18 min
34
Shots
20

8 January 2025; 16:00	Italy	0–4 (0–1, 0–2, 0–1)	Hungary	Tüskecsarnok, Budapest; Attendance: 347

Game reference

Emma Fortarel
Goalies
Noémi Takács
Referee:
(Germany) Svenja Strohmenger
Linesmen:
(Netherlands) Britt Kosters
(Austria) Hanna-Sophie Wacik

0–1	13:39 – Sághy (Báhiczki-Tóth, Szabó)
0–2	22:06 – Polónyi (Heizl, Báhiczki-Tóth) (PP)
0–3	23:49 – Kornyilov (Hajdú, Bátyi)
0–4	50:48 – Bátyi (Báhiczki-Tóth)

4 min
Penalties
10 min
24
Shots
23

8 January 2025; 19:30	Germany	3–4 (2–0, 0–1, 1–3)	France	Tüskecsarnok, Budapest; Attendance: 91

Game reference

Tara Bach
Goalies
Louna Ivaldy
Liv Wegmuller
Referee:
(Canada) Marie-Ève Couture
Linesmen:
(Canada) Joanie Duchesneau
(Latvia) Baiba Gvozdeva

Boico (Birka, Thume) (PP) – 03:16	1–0
Spagert (Nagle, Betten) – 06:12	2–0
	2–1	22:06 – Origlio (Moussier, Bened)
	2–2	44:07 – Dingival (Bernoussi)
	2–3	48:51 – Raigneau (Peyne-Dingival) (PP2)
Seyrer (Weichenhain, Zielinski) – 52:02	3–3
	3–4	54:17 – Sadoun (Moussier)

8 min
Penalties
6 min
34
Shots
21

10 January 2025; 12:30	Italy	2–1 (0–0, 0–1, 2–0)	Norway	Tüskecsarnok, Budapest; Attendance: 71

Game reference

Anna Corte Sualon
Goalies
Shiva Nobari
Referee:
(Canada) Marie-Ève Couture
Linesmen:
(Latvia) Baiba Gvozdeva
(Austria) Hanna-Sophie Wacik
(Hungary) Bernadett Holzer

	0–1	21:35 – Ness-Jacobsen
Fantin – 46:17	1–1
Fantin (Heidenberger) (SH) – 51:52	2–1

4 min
Penalties
4 min
27
Shots
25

10 January 2025; 16:00	Austria	2–1 OT (0–0, 0–1, 1–0) (OT: 1–0)	France	Tüskecsarnok, Budapest; Attendance: 97

Game reference

Kiara Matt
Goalies
Liv Wegmuller
Referee:
(Slovakia) Janka Chamulová
Linesmen:
(Hungary) Bernadett Holzer
(Hungary) Adrienn Paulheim

	0–1	33:32 – Bernoussi
Rumpl (Suppan, Prosen) (PP) – 50:00	1–1
Lintner (Picka, Henek) (PP) – 63:11	2–1

4 min
Penalties
12 min
30
Shots
19

10 January 2025; 19:30	Hungary	2–1 (1–0, 1–1, 0–0)	Germany	Tüskecsarnok, Budapest; Attendance: 727

Game reference

Noémi Takács
Goalies
Tara Bach
Referee:
(Latvia) Sarma Pone
Linesmen:
(Canada) Joanie Duchesneau
(Netherlands) Britt Kosters

Szabó (Báhiczki-Tóth, Weiler) (PP) – 05:13	1–0
	1–1	31:35 Boico (Birka, Thume)
Polónyi (Báhiczki-Tóth, Szabó) – 39:42	2–1

2 min
Penalties
2 min
22
Shots
16

11 January 2025; 12:30	France	3–5 (3–3, 0–1, 0–1)	Norway	Tüskecsarnok, Budapest; Attendance: 77

Game reference

Liv Wegmuller
Goalies
Tuva Are-Ekström
Referee:
(Germany) Svenja Strohmenger
Linesmen:
(Hungary) Adrienn Paulheim
(Hungary) Lili Santa

Chabert (Boudin, Paul-Constant) – 00:50	1–0
	1–1	07:13 – Sawyer (Bråten)
Origlio – 08:05	2–1
	2–2	09:40 – Toet-Uddveg (Sawyer, Austefjord)
	2–3	10:06 – Klomstad (Grini, Bråten)
Chabert (Origlio, Ratto) – 14:30	3–3
	3–4	29:38 – Arntzen (SH)
	3–5	47:29 – Toet-Uddveg (Fredriksen, Simensen) (PP)

4 min
Penalties
8 min
19
Shots
33

11 January 2025; 16:00	Germany	0–3 (0–0, 0–2, 0–1)	Italy	Tüskecsarnok, Budapest; Attendance: 115

Game reference

Hannah Loist
Goalies
Anna Corte Sualon
Referee:
(Latvia) Sarna Pone
Linesmen:
(Canada) Joanie Duchesneau
(Austria) Hanna-Sophie Wacik

0–1	33:11 – Bedont (PP)
0–2	37:20 – Innocenti (Heidenberger, Fantin)
0–3	57:03 – Heindenberger (Innocenti) (EN)

2 min
Penalties
2 min
17
Shots
21

11 January 2025; 19:30	Hungary	1–0 (0–0, 0–0, 1–0)	Austria	Tüskecsarnok, Budapest; Attendance: 700

Game reference
Helga Milibak	Goalies	Kiara Matt	Referee: (Canada) Marie-Ève Couture; Linesmen: (Latvia) Baiba Gvozdeva (Netherlands) Britt Kosters
Báhiczki-Tóth (Mozolai, Koncz) – 52:44 / 1–0			Referee: (Canada) Marie-Ève Couture; Linesmen: (Latvia) Baiba Gvozdeva (Netherlands) Britt Kosters
2 min	Penalties	2 min	Referee: (Canada) Marie-Ève Couture; Linesmen: (Latvia) Baiba Gvozdeva (Netherlands) Britt Kosters
20	Shots	21	Referee: (Canada) Marie-Ève Couture; Linesmen: (Latvia) Baiba Gvozdeva (Netherlands) Britt Kosters

=== Statistics ===
==== Scoring leaders ====
List shows the top skaters sorted by points, then goals.

Rank	Player	GP	G	A	Pts	+/−	PIM	POS
1	(Italy) Manuela Heidenberger	5	4	4	8	+8	6	F
2	(Italy) Matilde Fantin	5	3	5	8	+8	6	F
3	(Germany) Alexandra Boico	5	5	1	6	0	0	F
4	(Norway) Kajsa Bråten	5	3	3	6	+2	8	F
4	(Austria) Vanessa Picka	5	3	3	6	+2	8	F
6	(Hungary) Boglárka Báhiczki-Tóth	5	1	5	6	+3	0	D
7	(Austria) Emma Lintner	5	4	1	5	–2	4	F
8	(Italy) Maddalena Bedont	5	2	3	5	+7	0	D
8	(Hungary) Reka Hiezl	5	2	3	5	+6	0	F
8	(Hungary) Petra Polónyi	5	2	3	5	+6	0	F
8	(Hungary) Krisztina Weiler	5	2	3	5	+6	4	F

GP = Games played; G = Goals; A = Assists; Pts = Points; +/− = Plus/minus; PIM = Penalties in minutes; POS = Position
Source: IIHF

==== Leading goaltenders ====
Only the top five goaltenders, based on save percentage, who have played at least 40% of their team's minutes, are included in this list.

Rank	Player	TOI	GA	GAA	SA	Sv%	SO
1	(Hungary) Helga Milibak	120:00	0	0.00	59	100.00	2
2	(Hungary) Noémi Takács	180:00	2	0.67	64	96.88	1
3	(Italy) Anna Corte Sualon	240:00	5	1.25	98	94.90	1
4	(Germany) Hannah Loist	119:13	3	1.51	48	93.75	0
5	(France) Liv Wegmuller	296:22	13	2.63	153	91.50	0

TOI = Time on ice (minutes:seconds); SA = Shots against; GA = Goals against; GAA = Goals against average; Sv% = Save percentage; SO = Shutouts
Source: IIHF

=== Awards ===
- Best players selected by the directorate:
  - Best Goaltender: (Hungary) Noémi Takács
  - Best Defender: (Hungary) Boglárka Báhiczki-Tóth
  - Best Forward: (Italy) Matilde Fantin

Source: IIHF

== Group B tournament ==
2025 IIHF U18 Women's World Championship Division I Group B

Tournament details
- Host country: Poland
- City: Katowice
- Venue: 1 (in 1 host city)
- Dates: 7–13 January 2025
- Teams: 6

Tournament statistics
- Games played: 15
- Goals scored: 84 (5.6 per game)
- Attendance: 4,434 (296 per game)
- Scoring leader: (Denmark) Nikita Bergmann (13 points)

Official website
- www.iihf.com

The Division I Group B tournament was played in Katowice, Poland, from 7 to 13 January 2025.

=== Participating teams ===
Team	Qualification
Denmark	Placed 6th in Division I A last year and were relegated
Spain	Placed 2nd in Division I B last year
Poland	Hosts; placed 3rd in Division I B last year
Australia	Placed 4th in Division I B last year
South Korea	Placed 5th in Division I B last year
China	Placed 1st in Division II A last year and were promoted

=== Standings ===
Pos	Team	Pld	W	OTW	OTL	L	GF	GA	GD	Pts	Promotion or relegation
1	Denmark	5	5	0	0	0	27	2	+25	15	Promoted to the 2026 Division I A
2	Poland (H)	5	4	0	0	1	19	12	+7	12	
3	Spain	5	2	1	0	2	12	15	−3	8	
4	China	5	2	0	1	2	15	11	+4	7	
5	Australia	5	0	1	0	4	6	21	−15	2	
6	South Korea	5	0	0	1	4	5	23	−18	1	Relegated to the 2026 Division II A

Source: IIHF
Rules for classification: 1) points; 2) head-to-head points; 3) head-to-head goal difference; 4) head-to-head number of goals scored; 5) result against closest best-ranked team outside tied teams; 6) result against second-best ranked team outside tied teams; 7) seeding before tournament.
(H) Host

=== Match results ===
All times are local (Central European Time – UTC+1).

7 January 2025; 13:00	Australia	2–3 (1–0, 1–0, 0–3)	Spain	Jantor Arena, Katowice; Attendance: 110

Game reference
10 min	Penalties	6 min
24	Shots	19

7 January 2025; 16:30	South Korea	1–4 (0–0, 0–2, 1–2)	Poland	Jantor Arena, Katowice; Attendance: 422

Game reference
8 min	Penalties	6 min
15	Shots	49

7 January 2025; 20:00	China	0–4 (0–1, 0–1, 0–2)	Denmark	Jantor Arena, Katowice; Attendance: 185

Game reference
18 min	Penalties	12 min
11	Shots	33

8 January 2025; 13:00	Spain	4–1 (1–0, 1–1, 2–0)	South Korea	Jantor Arena, Katowice; Attendance: 120

Game reference
6 min	Penalties	12 min
52	Shots	16

8 January 2025; 16:30	Poland	4–2 (1–0, 2–1, 1–1)	China	Jantor Arena, Katowice; Attendance: 475

Game reference
6 min	Penalties	12 min
40	Shots	29

8 January 2025; 20:00	Denmark	6–0 (0–0, 3–0, 3–0)	Australia	Jantor Arena, Katowice; Attendance: 100

Game reference
0 min	Penalties	12 min
39	Shots	8

10 January 2025; 13:00	China	6–0 (1–0, 1–0, 4–0)	Australia	Jantor Arena, Katowice; Attendance: 150

Game reference
4 min	Penalties	14 min
40	Shots	22

10 January 2025; 16:30	Spain	2–6 (1–2, 0–2, 1–2)	Poland	Jantor Arena, Katowice; Attendance: 600

Game reference
6 min	Penalties	6 min
26	Shots	49

10 January 2025; 20:00	Denmark	8–2 (5–0, 2–0, 1–2)	South Korea	Jantor Arena, Katowice; Attendance: 102

Game reference
2 min	Penalties	4 min
38	Shots	16

12 January 2025; 13:00	Australia	2–1 GWS (0–1, 1–0, 0–0) (OT: 0–0) (SO: 1–0)	South Korea	Jantor Arena, Katowice; Attendance: 194

Game reference
8 min	Penalties	6 min
42	Shots	12

12 January 2025; 16:30	Poland	0–5 (0–1, 0–1, 0–3)	Denmark	Jantor Arena, Katowice; Attendance: 1,232

Game reference
8 min	Penalties	4 min
25	Shots	26

12 January 2025; 20:00	Spain	3–2 OT (1–2, 1–0, 0–0) (OT: 1–0)	China	Jantor Arena, Katowice; Attendance: 153

Game reference
10 min	Penalties	8 min
27	Shots	36

13 January 2025; 13:00	South Korea	0–5 (0–2, 0–1, 0–2)	China	Jantor Arena, Katowice; Attendance: 30

Game reference
8 min	Penalties	4 min
20	Shots	38

13 January 2025; 16:30	Poland	5–2 (1–1, 0–0, 4–1)	Australia	Jantor Arena, Katowice; Attendance: 404

Game reference
4 min	Penalties	8 min
34	Shots	16

13 January 2025; 20:00	Denmark	4–0 (0–0, 2–0, 2–0)	Spain	Jantor Arena, Katowice; Attendance: 157

Game reference
31 min	Penalties	12 min
48	Shots	15

=== Statistics ===
==== Scoring leaders ====
List shows the top skaters sorted by points, then goals.

Rank	Player	GP	G	A	Pts	+/−	PIM	POS
1	(Denmark) Nikita Bergmann	5	5	8	13	+8	0	F
2	(Poland) Małgorzata Zakrzewska	5	7	5	12	+8	6	F
3	(Denmark) Alma Madsen-Mygdal	5	5	4	9	+9	0	F
4	(Denmark) Olivia Ranum	5	4	3	7	+6	29	F
4	(Poland) Matylda Stępień	5	4	3	7	+6	4	F
6	(Denmark) Klara Holm	5	1	5	6	+6	0	D
7	(Poland) Agata Cybulska	5	0	6	6	+5	0	F
8	(Poland) Karolina Gawandtka	5	5	0	5	+4	2	F
9	(Denmark) Teresa Christensen	5	2	3	5	+7	0	F
9	(Denmark) Victoria Dahlmann	5	2	3	5	+5	2	F
9	(Spain) Kiera O'Hare	5	2	3	5	+2	4	F
9	(Denmark) Anglea Sloth	5	2	3	5	+6	2	F
9	(China) Anna Zhang	5	2	3	5	–1	2	F

GP = Games played; G = Goals; A = Assists; Pts = Points; +/− = Plus/minus; PIM = Penalties in minutes; POS = Position
Source: IIHF

==== Leading goaltenders ====
Only the top five goaltenders, based on save percentage, who have played at least 40% of their team's minutes, are included in this list.

Rank	Player	TOI	GA	GAA	SA	Sv%	SO
1	(Denmark) Anja Poulsen	240:00	0	0.00	59	100.00	4
2	(Spain) Carlotta Badorrey	266:50	12	2.70	149	91.95	0
3	(South Korea) Ahn Se-won	207:34	12	3.47	139	91.37	0
4	(China) Peng Yiyi	240:11	11	2.75	122	90.98	1
5	(Poland) Justyna Koszyk	297:48	12	2.42	112	89.29	0

TOI = Time on ice (minutes:seconds); SA = Shots against; GA = Goals against; GAA = Goals against average; Sv% = Save percentage; SO = Shutouts
Source: IIHF

=== Awards ===
- Best players selected by the directorate:
  - Best Goaltender: (Denmark) Anja Poulsen
  - Best Defender: (Poland) Nikola Isztok
  - Best Forward: (Denmark) Nikita Bergmann

Source: IIHF
