= 2020 IIHF U18 Women's World Championship Division I =

Women's ice hockey tournament

2020 IIHF World Women's U18 Championship Division I
Tournament details
- Host countries: Germany; Poland
- Venues: 2 (in 2 host cities)
- Dates: 3–9 January 2020; 2–8 January 2020
- Teams: 12

The 2020 IIHF U18 Women's World Championship Division I was two international under-18 women's ice hockey tournaments organized by the International Ice Hockey Federation (IIHF). Divisions I A and I B represent the second and the third tier of competition at the 2020 IIHF World Women's U18 Championship.

== Group A tournament ==
2020 IIHF World Women's U18 Championship Division I A

Tournament details
- Host country: Germany
- City: Füssen
- Venue: 1 (in 1 host city)
- Dates: 3–9 January 2020
- Teams: 6

Official website
- www.iihf.com

The Division I Group A tournament was played in Füssen, Germany, from 3 to 9 January 2020.

=== Participating teams ===
Team	Qualification
Japan	8th place in 2019 World Championship Top Division and were relegated
Germany	Hosts; 2nd place in 2019 World Championship Division I A
Hungary	3rd place in 2019 World Championship Division I A
Italy	4th place in 2019 World Championship Division I A
Denmark	5th place in 2019 World Championship Division I A
France	1st place in 2019 World Championship Division I B and were promoted

=== Final standings ===
Pos	Team	Pld	W	OTW	OTL	L	GF	GA	GD	Pts	Promotion or relegation
1	Germany (H)	5	4	1	0	0	18	2	+16	14	Promoted to the 2022 Top Division
2	Japan	5	4	0	0	1	20	3	+17	12	
3	Hungary	5	1	1	2	1	10	9	+1	7	
4	France	5	2	0	0	3	5	16	−11	6	
5	Italy	5	1	1	0	3	10	18	−8	5	
6	Denmark	5	0	0	1	4	5	20	−15	1	Relegated to the 2022 Division I B

Source: IIHF
Rules for classification: 1) points; 2) head-to-head points; 3) head-to-head goal difference; 4) head-to-head number of goals scored; 5) result against closest best-ranked team outside tied teams; 6) result against second-best ranked team outside tied teams; 7) seeding before tournament.
(H) Host

=== Results ===
3 January 2020; 13:00	France	0–5 (0–1, 0–2, 0–2)	Japan	Arena Füssen

Game reference

3 January 2020; 16:30	Italy	0–5 (0–2, 0–1, 0–2)	Germany	Arena Füssen

Game reference

3 January 2020; 20:00	Denmark	1–2 GWS (0–0, 1–0, 0–1) (0–0, 0–1)	Hungary	Arena Füssen

Game reference

4 January 2020; 13:00	Japan	5–0 (1–0, 3–0, 1–0)	Italy	Arena Füssen

Game reference

4 January 2020; 16:30	Hungary	4–1 (1–0, 2–1, 1–0)	France	Arena Füssen

Game reference

4 January 2020; 20:00	Germany	3–0 (1–0, 0–0, 2–0)	Denmark	Arena Füssen

Game reference

6 January 2020; 13:00	France	2–1 (0–0, 0–0, 2–1)	Italy	Arena Füssen

Game reference

6 January 2020; 16:30	Japan	7–0 (3–0, 2–0, 2–0)	Denmark	Arena Füssen

Game reference

6 January 2020; 20:00	Germany	2–1 GWS (0–0, 1–0, 0–1) (0–0, 1–0)	Hungary	Arena Füssen

Game reference

7 January 2020; 13:00	Italy	6–4 (1–3, 3–0, 2–1)	Denmark	Arena Füssen

Game reference

7 January 2020; 16:30	Hungary	1–2 (0–1, 1–1, 0–0)	Japan	Arena Füssen

Game reference

7 January 2020; 20:00	Germany	6–0 (1–0, 3–0, 2–0)	France	Arena Füssen

Game reference

9 January 2020; 11:00	Denmark	0–2 (0–0, 0–1, 0–1)	France	Arena Füssen

Game reference

9 January 2020; 14:30	Hungary	2–3 GWS (0–1, 1–0, 1–1) (0–0, 0–1)	Italy	Arena Füssen

Game reference

9 January 2020; 18:00	Japan	1–2 (0–0, 0–0, 1–2)	Germany	Arena Füssen

Game reference

== Group B tournament ==
2020 IIHF World Women's U18 Championship Division I B

Tournament details
- Host country: Poland
- City: Katowice
- Venue: 1 (in 1 host city)
- Dates: 2–8 January 2020
- Teams: 6

Official website
- www.iihf.com

The Division I Group B tournament was played in Katowice, Poland, from 2 to 8 January 2020.

=== Participating teams ===
Team	Qualification
Austria	6th place in 2019 World Championship Division I A and were relegated
Norway	2nd place in 2019 World Championship Division I B
Great Britain	3rd place in 2019 World Championship Division I B
Poland	Hosts; 4th place in 2019 World Championship Division I B
China	5th place in 2019 World Championship Division I B
South Korea	1st place in 2019 World Championship Division I B Qualification and were promoted

=== Final standings ===
Pos	Team	Pld	W	OTW	OTL	L	GF	GA	GD	Pts	Promotion or relegation
1	Norway	5	3	0	2	0	13	7	+6	11	Promoted to the 2022 Division I A
2	Austria	5	3	1	0	1	14	3	+11	11	
3	China	5	2	2	0	1	12	10	+2	10	
4	South Korea	5	1	1	0	3	7	12	−5	5	
5	Poland (H)	5	1	0	1	3	8	9	−1	4	
6	Great Britain	5	1	0	1	3	5	18	−13	4	Relegated to the 2022 Division II A

Source: IIHF
Rules for classification: 1) points; 2) head-to-head points; 3) head-to-head goal difference; 4) head-to-head number of goals scored; 5) result against closest best-ranked team outside tied teams; 6) result against second-best ranked team outside tied teams; 7) seeding before tournament.
(H) Host

=== Results ===
2 January 2020; 13:00	China	3–2 OT (0–1, 0–1, 2–0) (1–0)	Great Britain	Janów Arena, Katowice

Game reference

2 January 2020; 16:30	South Korea	0–4 (0–1, 0–2, 0–1)	Austria	Janów Arena, Katowice

Game reference

2 January 2020; 20:00	Poland	0–1 (0–0, 0–1, 0–0)	Norway	Janów Arena, Katowice

Game reference

3 January 2020; 13:00	Great Britain	1–0 (0–0, 0–0, 1–0)	South Korea	Janów Arena, Katowice

Game reference

3 January 2020; 16:30	Norway	1–2 OT (1–1, 0–0, 0–0) (0–1)	China	Janów Arena, Katowice

Game reference

3 January 2020; 20:00	Austria	2–1 OT (0–1, 0–0, 1–0) (1–0)	Poland	Janów Arena, Katowice

Game reference

5 January 2020; 13:00	Austria	4–0 (4–0, 0–0, 0–0)	China	Janów Arena, Katowice

Game reference

5 January 2020; 16:30	Norway	7–1 (3–1, 2–0, 2–0)	Great Britain	Janów Arena, Katowice

Game reference

5 January 2020; 20:00	South Korea	2–1 (1–1, 1–0, 0–0)	Poland	Janów Arena, Katowice

Game reference

7 January 2020; 13:00	Norway	2–3 OT (0–1, 1–1, 1–0) (0–1)	South Korea	Janów Arena, Katowice

Game reference

7 January 2020; 16:30	Great Britain	0–3 (0–1, 0–0, 0–2)	Austria	Janów Arena, Katowice

Game reference

7 January 2020; 20:00	Poland	1–3 (0–1, 0–1, 1–1)	China	Janów Arena, Katowice

Game reference

8 January 2020; 13:00	Austria	1–2 (0–0, 0–1, 1–1)	Norway	Janów Arena, Katowice

Game reference

8 January 2020; 16:30	China	4–2 (0–1, 1–0, 3–1)	South Korea	Janów Arena, Katowice

Game reference

8 January 2020; 20:00	Great Britain	1–5 (0–0, 0–2, 1–3)	Poland	Janów Arena, Katowice

Game reference
