= 2022 IIHF U18 Women's World Championship Division I =

Women's ice hockey tournament

2022 IIHF World Women's U18 Championship Division I
Tournament details
- Host countries: Hungary; Austria
- Venues: 2 (in 2 host cities)
- Dates: 3–8 April 2022; 6–11 September 2022
- Teams: 10

The 2022 IIHF U18 Women's World Championship Division I was two international under-18 women's ice hockey tournaments organized by the International Ice Hockey Federation (IIHF). Divisions I A and I B represent the second and the third tier of competition at the 2022 IIHF World Women's U18 Championship.

== Group A tournament ==
2022 IIHF World Women's U18 Championship Division I A

Tournament details
- Host country: Hungary
- City: Győr
- Venue: 1 (in 1 host city)
- Dates: 3–8 April 2022
- Teams: 5

Official website
- www.iihf.com

The Division I Group A tournament was played in Győr, Hungary, from 3 to 8 April 2022.

=== Participating teams ===
Team	Qualification
Japan	2nd place in 2020 World Championship Division I A
Hungary	Hosts; 3rd place in 2020 World Championship Division I A
France	4th place in 2020 World Championship Division I A
Italy	5th place in 2020 World Championship Division I A
Norway	1st place in 2020 World Championship Division I B and were promoted

=== Final standings ===
Pos	Team	Pld	W	OTW	OTL	L	GF	GA	GD	Pts	Promotion
1	Japan	4	4	0	0	0	26	0	+26	12	Promoted to the 2023 Top Division
2	France	4	2	1	0	1	9	9	0	8	
3	Italy	4	0	2	1	1	7	9	−2	5	
4	Hungary (H)	4	1	0	1	2	10	13	−3	4	
5	Norway	4	0	0	1	3	5	26	−21	1	

Source: IIHF
Rules for classification: 1) points; 2) head-to-head points; 3) head-to-head goal difference; 4) head-to-head number of goals scored; 5) result against closest best-ranked team outside tied teams; 6) result against second-best ranked team outside tied teams; 7) seeding before tournament.
(H) Host

=== Results ===
3 April 2022; 13:00	Japan	3–0 (2–0, 1–0, 0–0)	France	Nemak Ice Hall, Győr

Game reference

3 April 2022; 16:30	Norway	1–7 (0–3, 0–2, 1–2)	Hungary	Nemak Ice Hall, Győr

Game reference

4 April 2022; 16:30	Italy	3–2 GWS (2–0, 0–1, 0–1) (0–0, 1–0)	Norway	Nemak Ice Hall, Győr

Game reference

5 April 2022; 13:00	Italy	0–3 (0–0, 0–1, 0–2)	Japan	Nemak Ice Hall, Győr

Game reference

5 April 2022; 16:30	Hungary	2–3 (0–1, 0–2, 2–0)	France	Nemak Ice Hall, Győr

Game reference

6 April 2022; 16:30	Norway	0–13 (0–3, 0–7, 0–3)	Japan	Nemak Ice Hall, Győr

Game reference

7 April 2022; 13:00	France	3–2 (3–1, 0–0, 0–1)	Norway	Nemak Ice Hall, Győr

Game reference

7 April 2022; 16:30	Hungary	1–2 GWS (0–0, 0–1, 1–0) (0–0, 0–1)	Italy	Nemak Ice Hall, Győr

Game reference

8 April 2022; 13:00	France	3–2 OT (0–0, 1–2, 1–0) (1–0)	Italy	Nemak Ice Hall, Győr

Game reference

8 April 2022; 16:30	Japan	7–0 (4–0, 2–0, 1–0)	Hungary	Nemak Ice Hall, Győr

Game reference

== Group B tournament ==
2022 IIHF World Women's U18 Championship Division I B

Tournament details
- Host country: Austria
- City: Radenthein
- Venue: 1 (in 1 host city)
- Dates: 6–11 September 2022
- Teams: 5

Official website
- www.iihf.com

The Division I Group B tournament was played in Radenthein, Austria, from 6 to 11 September 2022.

=== Participating teams ===
Team	Qualification
Denmark	6th place in 2020 World Championship Division I A and were relegated
Austria	Hosts; 2nd place in 2020 World Championship Division I B
~~China~~	3rd place in 2020 World Championship Division I B; withdrawn from this year's tournament
South Korea	4th place in 2020 World Championship Division I B
Poland	5th place in 2020 World Championship Division I B
Chinese Taipei	1st place in 2020 World Championship Division II A and were promoted

=== Final standings ===
Pos	Team	Pld	W	OTW	OTL	L	GF	GA	GD	Pts	Promotion
1	Austria (H)	4	3	0	1	0	18	5	+13	10	Promoted to the 2023 Division I A
2	Poland	4	2	0	1	1	5	8	−3	7	
3	Chinese Taipei	4	1	1	0	2	7	16	−9	5	
4	South Korea	4	1	1	0	2	8	9	−1	5	
5	Denmark	4	1	0	0	3	7	7	0	3	

Source: IIHF
Rules for classification: 1) points; 2) head-to-head points; 3) head-to-head goal difference; 4) head-to-head number of goals scored; 5) result against closest best-ranked team outside tied teams; 6) result against second-best ranked team outside tied teams; 7) seeding before tournament.
(H) Host

=== Results ===
6 September 2022; 15:00	Denmark	4–0 (0–0, 0–0, 4–0)	Chinese Taipei	Nockhalle, Radenthein

Game reference

6 September 2022; 19:00	Austria	2–3 OT (1–1, 0–0, 1–1) (0–1)	South Korea	Nockhalle, Radenthein

Game reference

7 September 2022; 15:00	Chinese Taipei	4–1 (1–1, 2–0, 1–0)	South Korea	Nockhalle, Radenthein

Game reference

7 September 2022; 19:00	Poland	0–4 (0–2, 0–0, 0–2)	Austria	Nockhalle, Radenthein

Game reference

8 September 2022; 17:00	Poland	2–1 (0–0, 2–1, 0–0)	Denmark	Nockhalle, Radenthein

Game reference

9 September 2022; 15:00	South Korea	3–1 (1–0, 2–0, 0–1)	Denmark	Nockhalle, Radenthein

Game reference

9 September 2022; 19:00	Austria	10–1 (3–1, 1–0, 6–0)	Chinese Taipei	Nockhalle, Radenthein

Game reference

10 September 2022; 16:00	Chinese Taipei	2–1 OT (1–0, 0–1, 0–0) (1–0)	Poland	Nockhalle, Radenthein

Game reference

11 September 2022; 14:00	South Korea	1–2 (0–1, 0–1, 1–0)	Poland	Nockhalle, Radenthein

Game reference

11 September 2022; 18:00	Denmark	1–2 (0–0, 1–1, 0–1)	Austria	Nockhalle, Radenthein

Game reference
