= Lilli Welcke =

German ice hockey player (born 2002)

- Born: 29 April 2002 (age 24) Heidelberg, Germany
- Height: 1.66 m (5 ft 5 in)
- Weight: 66 kg (146 lb; 10 st 6 lb)
- Position: Forward
- Shoots: Right
- DFEL team Former teams: EKU Mannheim; Mad Dogs Mannheim; Maine Black Bears; Boston University Terriers
- National team: Germany
- Playing career: 2016–present

Lilli Welcke (born 29 April 2002) is a German ice hockey player. She has played on the German national ice hockey team since 2022. Welcke participated in the women's ice hockey tournament at the 2026 Winter Olympics.

== Playing career ==
=== College ===
Welcke began her college ice hockey career in the 2022–23 season with the Maine Black Bears women's ice hockey program in the Hockey East (HEA) conference of the NCAA Division I. She was named the Hockey East Rookie of the Month for December 2022 after leading all HEA rookies in November with six points on one goal and five assists. She earned 21 points on six goals and fifteen assists in her first NCAA season and was a unanimous selection to the Hockey East All-Rookie Team.

Ahead of the 2023–24 season, she transferred within the HEA conference to the Boston University Terriers women's ice hockey program. In her first season with the Terriers, Welcke tallied ten points on one goal and nine assists. As a junior in the 2024–25 season, she led the Terriers in faceoff wins and scored seventeen points (5+12).

== International play ==
As a junior player with the German national under-18 team, Welcke participated in four IIHF U18 Women's World Championship – three Division 1 Group A tournaments and one Top Division tournament. At the Top Division tournament in 2018, she tied as Germany's point leader with two goals and two assists.

Welcke made her debut with the senior national team in the qualification tournament for the 2022 Winter Olympics. Though Germany failed to qualify, Welcke led the team in scoring with two goals and two assists across three games.

She has represented Germany at the IIHF Women's World Championship in 2022, 2024, and 2025. Welcke was named to the German team for the 2023 IIHF Women's World Championship but sustained a lower body injury in a pre-tournament match against Switzerland and was replaced on the roster by Jule Schiefer.

In the preliminary round of the women's ice hockey tournament at the 2026 Winter Olympics, Germany prevailed versus France in a 2–1 overtime win. Welcke notched the primary assist on the overtime winner scored by Nina Jobst-Smith.

== Personal life ==
Welcke and her twin sister, Luisa, were born on 29 April 2002 in Heidelberg, Germany. Lilli, Luisa, and their elder sister, Lea, began playing minor ice hockey after participating in an ice hockey camp held at the Heidelberg Christmas Market outdoor rink. Lilli and Luise have played on the same teams throughout their careers.

An accomplished student-athlete, Welcke was named a Top Scholar-Athlete of the 2022–23 Hockey East All-Academic Team after compiling a perfect 4.0 GPA for the season. She continued to achieve at least a 3.0 GPA in the following seasons and was named to the Hockey East All-Academic Teams in 2023–24 and 2024–25.

== Career statistics ==
=== International ===
Year	Team	Event	Result	GP	G	A	Pts	PIM
2017	Germany	U18 D1A	1st	5	2	0	2	0
2018	Germany	U18	8th	5	2	2	4	4
2019	Germany	U18 D1A	2nd	5	4	2	6	2
2020	Germany	U18 D1A	1st	5	2	1	3	4
2022	Germany	OGQ	DNQ	3	2	2	4	0
2022	Germany	WC	9th	4	0	1	1	0
2024	Germany	WC	6th	6	1	3	4	4
2025	Germany	OGQ	Q	3	2	1	3	2
2025	Germany	WC	8th	5	1	3	4	2
2026	Germany	OG	7th	5	0	1	1	2
Junior totals				20	10	5	15	10
Senior totals				20	2	8	10	8

== Awards and honours ==
- 2023 Hockey East All-Rookie Team
- 2025 IIHF Women's World Championship, Top-Three Player on Team
