= Australia women's national under-18 ice hockey team =

- Association: Ice Hockey Australia
- General manager: Candice Mitchell
- Head coach: Tamra Jones
- Assistants: Remi Harvey; Gabe Robledo
- Captain: Molly Lukowiak
- Team colors

First international
- New Zealand 2 – 2 Australia (Dunedin, New Zealand; 6 December 2013)

Biggest win
- Australia 10 – 0 Romania (San Sebastián, Spain; 29 January 2017)

Biggest defeat
- Norway 15 – 0 Australia (Jaca, Spain; 8 January 2024)

IIHF World Women's U18 Championships
- Appearances: 5 (first in 2016)
- Best result: 6th – Div. I Gr. B (20th overall, 2018)

International record (W–L–T)
- 7–18–1

The Australian National Women's Under-18 ice hockey Team (NWU18T) is the women's National Under-18 ice hockey team of Australia. The team is controlled by Ice Hockey Australia, a member of the International Ice Hockey Federation.

== History ==
The Australian NWU18T was formed in 2012 in order to qualify and compete in the IIHF World Women's U18 Championships. The team held its first training camp in September 2012 in Adelaide, South Australia and in January 2013 held another training camp in Brisbane, Queensland. Tamra Jones was named as the team's first Head Coach with Jo Frankenberger as her assistant. Following the two camps, 14 players and one goalie were included on the team roster. The team played their first game on 6 December 2013 against the New Zealand women's national under-18 ice hockey team in Dunedin, New Zealand, tying 2–2. It was part of a four-game series being held in Dunedin between the two teams. Australia went on to lose the remaining three games of the series. In December 2014 Australia hosted the New Zealand women's national under-18 ice hockey team for a five-game series at the Medibank Icehouse in Melbourne. The team won the series three games to two and were awarded the 2014 Trans-Tasman Cup. They also recorded their largest international win in game four, defeating New Zealand 8–1. In August 2015 Australia competed in two games against the Denmark women's national under-18 ice hockey team as part of their 2015 Denmark Tour which also included a training camp that had begun on 25 July. Australia lost the opening game 2–12 with Natalie Ayris and Madison Poole scoring the team's two goals. In the second game of the tour Australia lost 1–9 with Emily Davis-Tope scoring the only goal on the third period buzzer.

In January 2016 the team debuted at the IIHF World Women's U18 Championships where they played in the 2016 Division I Qualification tournament in Spittal an der Drau and Radenthein, Austria. Australia was placed in Group B with Great Britain, Italy and Poland. The team finished last in Group B's preliminary round after losing all three of their games and advanced to the seventh place classification game against Romania, who had finished last in Group A. Australia defeated Romania following a shootout and finished the tournament in seventh place. Kate Tihema was selected as best Australian player of the tournament. The team started 2017 with a training camp in January in Copenhagen, Denmark ahead of the 2017 IIHF Ice Hockey U18 Women's World Championship Division I Group B Qualification tournament. During the training camp Australia took on the Danish women's under-18 team in two exhibition games where they lost 3–5 and 0–3. The team then traveled to San Sebastián, Spain for the start of their World Championship tournament. At the tournament Australia took on hosts Spain, Mexico and Romania in a single round robin schedule. Australia won the tournament after winning all three of their games which including their largest international win on record, defeating Romania 10–0. As a result of the tournament win Australia earned promotion to Division I Group B for the 2018 World Championships. Goaltender Keesha Atkins was selected as best Australian player of the tournament.

In January 2018 Australia arrived in Katowice, Poland for the Division I B tournament. Prior to the start of the tournament the team played Denmark in an exhibition game which they lost 0–10. Australia opened the Division I Group B tournament with a 1–6 loss to France. They went on to lose their other four games of the tournament against China, Denmark, Great Britain and Poland, and finished the tournament in last place. As a result, the team was relegated back to Division I Group B Qualification for 2019. Captain Emily Davis-Tope was named best Australian player of the tournament.

2019 Championship

Held in Eindhoven, Netherlands. The Australian team were able to play an exhibition game against current/former Dutch Senior National Team players in Tilburg.

The tournament included Netherlands (host), Chinese Taipei, and Kazakhstan. Games against Netherlands who had just come down from Division 1 was close. Australia would cause an upset beating Kazakhstan for the first time in Australia's history. Australia would medal for Bronze after a late defeat to Chinese Taipei.

Medal: Bronze

2020 – 2022 Championships

IIHF would cancel all women's tournaments due to worldwide COVID-19 pandemic.

2022 Championship

After trialling tournaments in a regulated risk averse manner, IIHF would vow to play cancelled tournaments and the 2022 Championship would go ahead in Turkey in July. This would be interesting for multiple reasons.

The AWIHL National League was set up in Australia's summer to coincide with World Championships. Australia's winter seasons had also been affected (during European Summers) by the pandemic.

Held in Istanbul, Turkiye a decision was made to go regardless and the team was selected. The set up would see IIHF join both groups for 9 teams:

Australia, Iceland, Turkiye, Kazakhstan, Mexico, Great Britain, Spain, Netherlands, Latvia

Australia would play Spain in an exhibition and their training throughout the pandemic showed. Australia would later be pooled with Iceland and Spain. Australia again ticking off something in the history books with a W against first time opponents Iceland. Spain would show how disciplined they were only allowing one goal against.

Due to the grouping at the tournament, moving forward the highest that Australia could place would be Bronze and lowest wouls be to face relegation.

A win against Turkiye (another first for the NWU18T) put Australia against a new IIHF team, Latvia. Latvia also had the tournament's highest point scorer, Linda Rulle.

Australia would win 2–1 against Latvia with notable performances by Co-Captain Olivia Last, Natashe Dubé and Elana Holub. The team only allowing one goal from Linda Rulle. Elana would respond with an inspiring goal from the halfway line which the goalie would mishandle and allow in. Natasha providing insurance for the win. The win would be historic again as Australia's first ever win again Latvia.

This allowed a rematch against Netherlands for the bronze medal game. On-ice delays would cause added pressure as exposed piping would create significant delays in the game. The rink however would repair the issues and the game would play on.

Locked at 1–1, Co-Captain Ebony Brunt would score the go ahead goal to win the game. Another historic win for Australia to record the countries first ever win against Team Netherlands and the program's second bronze medal.

Spain would go on to win the gold medal, with Australia's goal being the only Goal Against in the round robin. Great Britain would score one against in their Grand Final defeat for Silver.

Medal: Bronze

Co-Captain Ebony Brunt

Co-Captain Olivia Last

Asst Capt Phoebe Roberts

Asst Capt Courtney Mahoney

2023 Championship

Following what was deemed a success due to the sheer adversity faced by the Australian team in the tournament 6 months prior, there were a lot of external expectations placed on the team to continue their success.

Held in Dumfries, Scotland. Teams that participated were Great Britain (host), Australia, Netherlands, Latvia, Turkiye, Mexico

Australia would have a tough game against a well prepared Turkiye team. It was evident the team had spent time working on issues from the previous tournament giving up a lot less in opportunities. The Turkish goalie also denying multiple high percentage chances. Australia would go on to win the game and make plans to move forward from that game.

Netherlands was visibly shaken by the improvements the Australian team had made between tournaments. Noticeably younger, it had worked in Australia's favour to have so many newcomers the previous year to get experience under their belt. Madison Smith having her first 'official' international IIHF shutout. (Her first being a shared shutout with Olivia against Turkiye in 2022), which was another first in IHA history books.

Mexico was a faster game but Australia had the momentum throughout the game. Natasha Dubé getting two goals again in back to back games and Hannah Cryan getting her first IIHF goal.

This would lead to a potential Gold medal match up against Latvia who were looking for redemption. Courtney Mahoney would score 2 important goals in her best game of the tournament. Madison Smith shutting out repeat tournament top scorer Linda Rulle and only allowing 2 goals against. The game would be a 1-goal differential win with Elana Holub would make her mark again against Latvia, for 3–2 win to receive the gold medal.

Medal: Gold

Captain Molly Lukowiak

Asst Capt Courtney Mahoney

Asst Capt Phoebe Roberts

== International competitions ==
- 2016 IIHF World Women's U18 Championship. Finish: 7th in Division I Qualification (21st overall)
- 2017 IIHF World Women's U18 Championship. Finish: 1st in Division I Group B Qualification (21st overall)
- 2018 IIHF World Women's U18 Championship. Finish: 6th in Division I Group B (20th overall)
- 2019 IIHF World Women's U18 Championship. Finish: 4th in Division I Group B Qualification (24th overall)
- 2020 IIHF World Women's U18 Championship. Finish: 3rd in Division II A (23rd overall)
- 2022 IIHF World Women's U18 Championship. Finish: 3rd in Division II (21st overall)
- 2023 IIHF World Women's U18 Championship. Finish: 1st in Division II A (20th overall)
- 2024 IIHF World Women's U18 Championship. Finish: 4th in Division I B (18th overall)
- 2025 IIHF World Women's U18 Championship. Finish: 5th in Division I B (19th overall)

== Players and personnel ==
=== Current roster ===
For the 2022 IIHF World Women's U18 Championship Division II

#	Name	Pos	S/G	Age	Club
1	Olivia Last	G	L	21	RoKi Naiset
2	Ebony Brunt (C)	F	L	22	Sydney Sirens
3	Amber Bedell	F	L	18	Adelaide Rush
4	Nikita Aguirrezabal	F	R	21	Sydney Sirens
5	Courtney Mahoney (A)	F	R	21	Ontario Hockey Academy
6	Samantha Payne	D	R	21	Newcastle Northstars
7	Phoebe Roberts (A)	F	R	21	Notre Dame Hounds
8	Faith Kilgallon	F	R	21	Flyers Ice Hockey Club
10	Madison Sargeant	D	R	22	Canberra Pirates
11	Charlize Novatsis	D	R	20	Perth Inferno
12	Lucinda York	F	R	20	Canberra Pirates
13	Katrina Rapchuk	D	L	19	Southern Stars
16	Molly Lukowiak	F	L	21	Perth Inferno
17	Gabrielle Arps	D	R	19	Sydney Bears
18	Natasha Dube	F	L	18	Gloucester Cumberland Girls Hockey
19	Lily Roberts	D	R	18	Sydney Bears
21	Elizabeth Marshall	F	R	21	Notre Dame Hounds
23	Amelia Grigaliunas	D	R	19	Melbourne Jets
24	Elana Holub	F	R	18	Adelaide Rush
25	Madison Smith	G	L	21	Adelaide Falcons

=== Current team staff ===
For the 2022 IIHF World Women's U18 Championship Division II

- Head coach: Tamra Jones
- Assistant coach: Remi Harvey
- Assistant coach: Gabriel Robledo
- General Manager: Candice Mitchell
- Team Leader: Mark Stephenson
- Team Medical Officer: James Brodie

== Game record ==
Date	Location	Versus	Result	Score	Comments	Reference
6 December 2013	Dunedin, New Zealand	New Zealand	Draw	2–2	Exhibition	
7 December 2013	Dunedin, New Zealand	New Zealand	Loss		Exhibition	
8 December 2013	Dunedin, New Zealand	New Zealand	Loss		Exhibition	
9 December 2013	Dunedin, New Zealand	New Zealand	Loss		Exhibition	
3 December 2014	Melbourne, Australia	New Zealand	Loss	0–3	Exhibition	
4 December 2014	Melbourne, Australia	New Zealand	Loss	1–2	Exhibition	
5 December 2014	Melbourne, Australia	New Zealand	Win	2–1	Exhibition	
6 December 2014	Melbourne, Australia	New Zealand	Win	8–1	Exhibition	
7 December 2014	Melbourne, Australia	New Zealand	Win	4–3 (OT)	Exhibition	
2 August 2015	Copenhagen, Denmark	Denmark	Loss	2–12	Exhibition	
3 August 2015	Copenhagen, Denmark	Denmark	Loss	1–9	Exhibition	
7 January 2016	Radenthein, Austria	Poland	Loss	0–11	2016 World Championships	
8 January 2016	Radenthein, Austria	Italy	Loss	0–8	2016 World Championships	
10 January 2016	Radenthein, Austria	Great Britain	Loss	2–3	2016 World Championships	
11 January 2016	Radenthein, Austria	Romania	Win	7–6 (SO)	2016 World Championships	
21 January 2017	Copenhagen, Denmark	Denmark	Loss	3–5	Exhibition	
21 January 2017	Copenhagen, Denmark	Denmark	Loss	0–3	Exhibition	
26 January 2017	San Sebastian, Spain	Spain	Win	3–1	2017 World Championships	
28 January 2017	San Sebastian, Spain	Mexico	Win	5–0	2017 World Championships	
29 January 2017	San Sebastian, Spain	Romania	Win	10–0	2017 World Championships	
