= China national hockey team =

China national hockey team may refer to:

- China men's national field hockey team
- China women's national field hockey team
- China men's national ice hockey team
  - China men's national junior ice hockey team
  - China men's national under-18 ice hockey team
- China women's national ice hockey team
  - China women's national under-18 ice hockey team
