= Luisa Welcke =

German ice hockey player (born 2002)

- Born: 29 April 2002 (age 24) Heidelberg, Germany
- Height: 1.66 m (5 ft 5 in)
- Weight: 66 kg (146 lb; 10 st 6 lb)
- Position: Forward
- Shoots: Right
- DFEL team Former teams: EKU Mannheim; Mad Dogs Mannheim; Maine Black Bears; Boston University Terriers
- National team: Germany
- Playing career: 2016–present

Luisa Welcke (born 29 April 2002) is a German ice hockey player. She has been a member of the German national team since 2021, and participated in the women's ice hockey tournament at the 2026 Winter Olympics.

== Playing career ==
=== College ===
Welcke has played college ice hockey with the Boston University Terriers women's ice hockey program in the Hockey East (HEA) conference of the NCAA Division I since 2023. Prior to joining the Terriers, she spent the 2022-23 season with the Maine Black Bears women's ice hockey program and amassed 22 points on eight goals and 14 assists.

=== International ===
In Germany's third game at the 2026 Winter Olympics, Germany defeated France in overtime. Welcke recorded an assist on the overtime winner scored by Nina Jobst-Smith.

== Personal life ==
Welcke and her twin sister, Lilli, were born on 29 April 2002 in Heidelberg, Germany. As children, Luisa, Lilli, and their elder sister, Lea (born 1999), began playing minor ice hockey after participating in an ice hockey camp held at the outdoor rink of the Heidelberg Christmas Market. Lilli and Luise have played on the same teams throughout their careers.

== Career statistics ==
=== International ===
Year	Team	Event	Result	GP	G	A	Pts	PIM
2017	Germany	U18 D1A	1st	5	0	0	0	0
2018	Germany	U18	8th	5	2	2	4	6
2019	Germany	U18 D1A	2nd	5	3	3	6	0
2020	Germany	U18 D1A	1st	5	2	2	4	4
2022	Germany	WC	9th	4	1	0	1	0
2023	Germany	WC	8th	6	0	1	1	0
2024	Germany	WC	6th	6	2	1	3	0
2025	Germany	OGQ	Q	3	1	2	3	0
2025	Germany	WC	8th	5	1	2	3	0
2026	Germany	OG	7th	5	0	3	3	2
Junior totals				20	7	7	14	10
Senior totals				26	4	7	11	2

== Awards and honours ==
- Hockey East Pro Ambitions Rookie of the Week (awarded 28 November 2022)
- 2022–23 Hockey East All-Academic Team
- 2023 Hockey East Pro Ambitions All-Rookie Team (unanimous selection)
