= South Korea women's national under-18 ice hockey team =

- Association: Korea Ice Hockey Association
- General manager: Song Chi Young Benedict
- Head coach: Kim Geunho
- Assistants: Lee Minji; Moon Younghoe
- Captain: Kim Jiyoon (2024)
- Most games: Kim Dowon (14); Yoo Seoyoung (20)
- Top scorer: Song Yunha (7)
- Most points: Song Yunha (9)
- Team colors
- IIHF code: KOR

First international
- South Korea 1 – 0 Spain (Jaca, Spain; 12 January 2019)

Biggest win
- South Korea 10 – 0 New Zealand (Istanbul, Turkey; 22 January 2026)

Biggest defeat
- Poland 6 – 0 South Korea (Katowice, Poland; 10 January 2023); Denmark 8 – 2 South Korea (Katowice, Poland; 10 January 2025)

IIHF World Women's U18 Championship - Division IB
- Appearances: 4 (first in 2020)
- Best result: 4th – Div. I Gr. B (18th overall, 2020)

International record (W–L–T)
- 11–12–0

The South Korea women's national under-18 ice hockey team is the women's national under-18 ice hockey team of South Korea. The team is controlled by the Korea Ice Hockey Association, a member of the International Ice Hockey Federation. The team made its international debut in January 2019 and currently plays in Division I Group B of the IIHF World Women's U18 Championships.

== History ==
The South Korea women's national under-18 ice hockey team debuted at the 2019 IIHF World Women's U18 Championship Division I Group B Qualification tournament in Jaca, Spain. Their opening game of the tournament was against Spain which they won 1–0. South Korea went on to win their next two preliminary round games, including a 5–0 win over Mexico which is currently their largest win on record. The team finished at the top of Group B in the preliminary round and were drawn against Australia for the semifinals. South Korea won their semifinal and advanced to the gold medal game against Kazakhstan. South Korea won the match 4–3 following a shootout and gained promotion to Division I Group B for 2020. The IIHF Directorate named Eom Suyeon the tournament's best defender and Kim Heewon was selected as the best South Korean player of the tournament.

In January 2020 South Korea travelled to Katowice, Poland for the 2020 IIHF World Women's U18 Championship Division I Group B. Their opening game against Austria which they lost 0–4, currently their largest loss on record. South Korea went on to finish the tournament in fourth after winning two games of their five games and finishing ahead of Poland and Great Britain. Huh Eun-Bee was named the best South Korean player of the tournament.

== International competitions ==
- 2019 IIHF World Women's U18 Championship. Finish: 1st in Division I Group B Qualification (21st overall)
- 2020 IIHF World Women's U18 Championship. Finish: 4th in Division I Group B (18th overall)
- 2022 IIHF World Women's U18 Championship. Finish: 4th in Division I Group B (17th overall)
- 2023 IIHF World Women's U18 Championship. Finish: 4th in Division I Group B (18th overall)
- 2024 IIHF World Women's U18 Championship. Finish: 5th in Division I Group B (19th overall)
- 2025 IIHF World Women's U18 Championship. Finish: 6th in Division I Group B (20th overall)

== Players and personnel ==
=== 2024 roster ===
Roster for the 2024 IIHF U18 Women's World Championship Division I Group B.

Head coach: Kim Geunho
Assistant coaches: Lee Minji, Moon Younghoe

No.	Pos.	Name	Height	Weight	Birthdate	Club
1	G	Cheon Hyoseo	1.70 m (5 ft 7 in)	58 kg (128 lb)	24 May 2006 (age 20)	(Canada) North Shore Warriors
3	F	Kwon Sowan	1.60 m (5 ft 3 in)	45 kg (99 lb)	5 March 2007 (age 19)	(South Korea) Mokdong Hurricanes
5	D	Kim Sarang – A	1.69 m (5 ft 7 in)	59 kg (130 lb)	4 November 2006 (age 19)	(South Korea) Mokdong Hurricanes
6	D	Kim Jimin	1.59 m (5 ft 3 in)	57 kg (126 lb)	15 May 2009 (age 17)	(South Korea) Mokdong Hurricanes
8	F	Han Yuan	1.63 m (5 ft 4 in)	55 kg (121 lb)	17 September 2008 (age 18)	(Canada) Ontario Hockey Academy
9	D	Song Heeoh	1.63 m (5 ft 4 in)	52 kg (115 lb)	1 March 2007 (age 19)	(South Korea) Mokdong Hurricanes
10	F	Jang Hyeonjeong	1.55 m (5 ft 1 in)	50 kg (110 lb)	14 September 2009 (age 17)	(South Korea) Korea
11	F	Seo Hyejeong	1.60 m (5 ft 3 in)	55 kg (121 lb)	20 October 2007 (age 19)	(South Korea) Korea
12	F	Shim Seohee – A	1.65 m (5 ft 5 in)	50 kg (110 lb)	28 January 2008 (age 18)	(South Korea) Zenith Frauen
15	D	Park Juyeon	1.71 m (5 ft 7 in)	60 kg (130 lb)	28 January 2008 (age 18)	(South Korea) Zenith Frauen
16	D	Choi Seoyoon	1.68 m (5 ft 6 in)	61 kg (134 lb)	1 June 2009 (age 17)	(South Korea) Mokdong Hurricanes
17	D	Moon Soyoon	1.64 m (5 ft 5 in)	58 kg (128 lb)	28 January 2007 (age 19)	(South Korea) Mokdong Hurricanes
18	D	Kim Jiyoon – C	1.61 m (5 ft 3 in)	60 kg (130 lb)	3 September 2006 (age 20)	(South Korea) Mokdong Hurricanes
19	F	Han Chaeyeon	1.60 m (5 ft 3 in)	55 kg (121 lb)	17 January 2009 (age 17)	(South Korea) Mokdong Hurricanes
20	G	Bae Jeongyeon	1.62 m (5 ft 4 in)	59 kg (130 lb)	21 September 2007 (age 19)	(South Korea) Mokdong Hurricanes
22	D	Na Seyoung	1.63 m (5 ft 4 in)	58 kg (128 lb)	2 February 2009 (age 17)	(South Korea) Zenith Frauen
24	F	Han Yejin	1.60 m (5 ft 3 in)	50 kg (110 lb)	24 December 2008 (age 17)	(South Korea) Zenith Frauen

- Team average height: 1.63 m (5 ft 4 in)
- Team average weight: 55 kg (121 lb)
- Team average age: 15 years
