= Anaïs Peyne-Dingival =

French ice hockey player (born 2007)

- Born: 29 May 2007 (age 19) Compiègne, Oise, France
- Height: 1.67 m (5 ft 6 in)
- Weight: 70 kg (154 lb; 11 st 0 lb)
- Position: Forward
- Shoots: Left
- RSEQ team: John Abbott College Islanders
- National team: France
- Playing career: 2022–present

Anaïs Peyne-Dingival (born 29 May 2007) is a French ice hockey forward who plays for the Islanders women's ice hockey program of John Abbott College in the Hockey Collégial Féminin Division 1 of RSEQ. She represents France internationally, including at the IIHF Women's World Championship and the 2026 Winter Olympics.

== Early life ==
Peyne-Dingival was born in Compiègne and began playing ice hockey at age four with the local club, influenced by her brother.

== Playing career ==
At age 15, Peyne-Dingival joined the women's programme of the Cergy-Pontoise Jokers, winning runner-up finishes in the French championship in 2022 and 2023. In 2023, she entered France’s Pôle France development programme while continuing to play with Cergy-Pontoise.

In 2025, she moved to Canada to continue her development with the John Abbott College Islanders in Quebec.

== International play ==
Peyne-Dingival represented France in the Group A tournament of the 2025 IIHF U18 Women's World Championship Division I, where France finished fifth.

She made her senior World Championship debut for France at the 2025 IIHF Women’s World Championship Division I, Group A in Shenzhen, as France placed fourth in the tournament.

Peyne-Dingival was selected for France’s squad for the women's ice hockey tournament at the 2026 Winter Olympics and appeared in four games, recording one assist.

== Career statistics ==
			Regular season					Playoffs
Season	Team	League	GP	G	A	Pts	PIM	GP	G	A	Pts	PIM
2025–26	John Abbott College Islanders	RSEQ	24	9	14	23	27	—	—	—	—	—

=== International ===
Year	Team	Event	Result	GP	G	A	Pts	PIM
2025	France	U18 (D1A)	5th	5	1	1	2	6
2025	France	WC (D1A)	4th	5	0	0	0	0
2026	France	OG	10th	4	0	1	1	0
Senior totals				9	0	1	1	0
