= Jeff MacLeod =

Canadian ice hockey coach

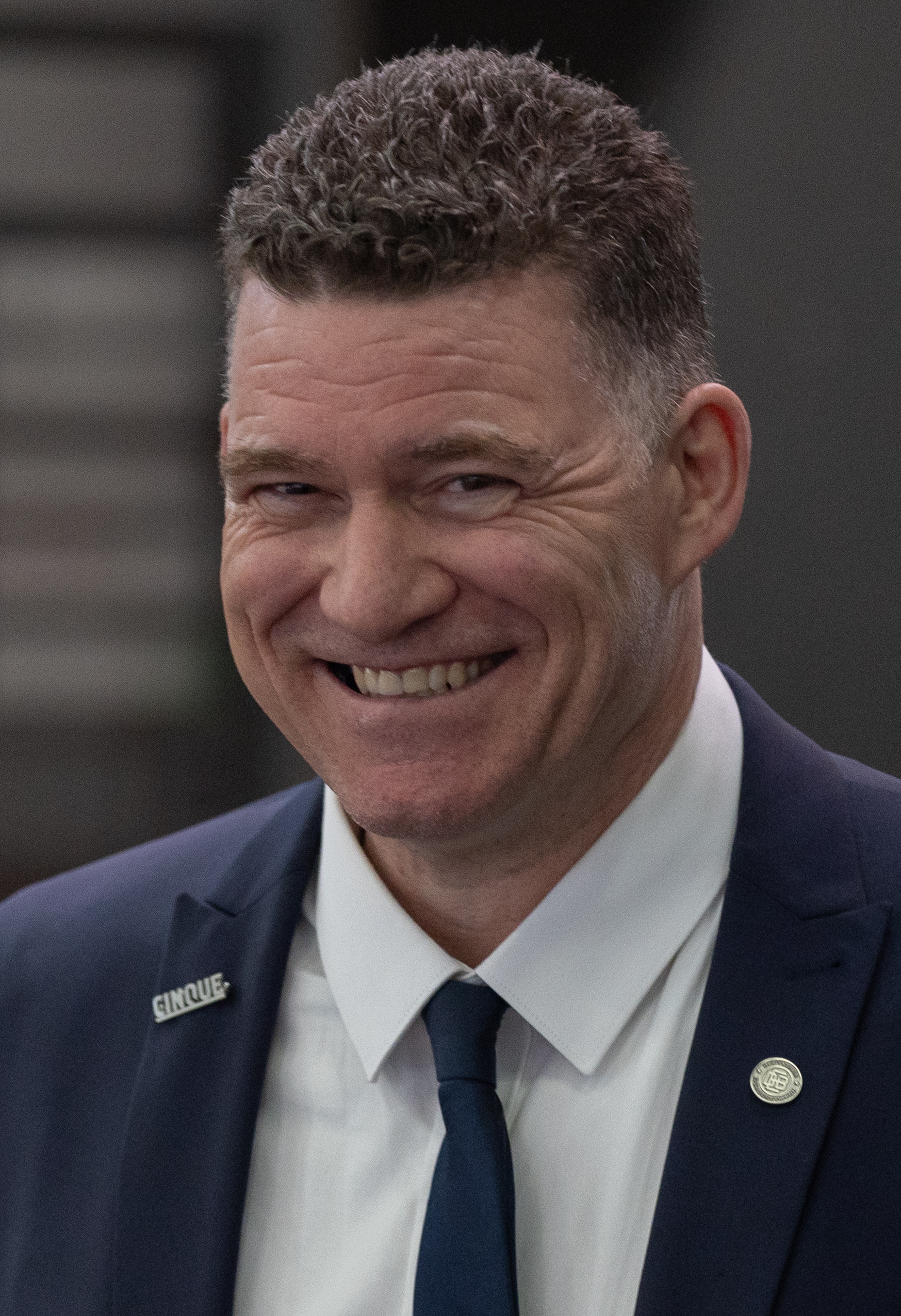
- MacLeod in 2026
- Born: Dartmouth, Nova Scotia, Canada
- Position: Defenceman
- Shoots: Left
- Played for: Kaufbeuren Eagles; Kassel Huskies
- Current National team coach: Germany
- Coached for: ERC Ingolstadt (junior)

Jeff MacLeod is a Canadian ice hockey coach and former professional defenceman. He has been the head coach of the Germany women's national ice hockey team since 1 June 2023. In January 2026, the Deutscher Eishockey-Bund (DEB) extended his contract through the end of the 2026–27 season. Under his tenure, Germany qualified for the women's ice hockey tournament at the 2026 Winter Olympics, returning to the Olympics for the first time since 2014, and reached the quarterfinals.

== Playing career ==
MacLeod played junior hockey with the Belleville Bulls and later played university hockey at Acadia University. He also played for Canada in international competition during the mid-1990s.

In Europe, MacLeod played professionally in Germany's top division, the Deutsche Eishockey Liga (DEL), including for the Kassel Huskies and Kaufbeuren Eagles. He appeared in 335 DEL regular-season games between 1997 and 2004.

== Coaching career ==
=== Club roles ===
MacLeod served as an assistant coach in the Quebec Major Junior Hockey League with the Halifax Mooseheads during the 2008–09 season. In Germany, he joined ERC Ingolstadt's development system in 2021 as head coach of the club's U20 team in the Deutsche Nachwuchsliga (DNL). In 2022, ERC Ingolstadt announced that he would serve as the club's development coach at the DEL level.

=== Germany women's national team ===
MacLeod was appointed head coach of the Germany women's national team in May 2023, with his tenure beginning on 1 June 2023; he previously served as an assistant coach with the national team staff. In February 2025, Germany won its final Olympic qualification group in Bremerhaven to secure a place at the 2026 Winter Olympics. The DEB credited his tenure with consecutive quarterfinal finishes at the IIHF Women's World Championship in 2024 and 2025, as well as Germany's qualification for the 2026 Olympics.

At the 2026 Winter Olympics, Germany reached the quarterfinals and was eliminated by Canada. International coverage also listed MacLeod among Canadian coaches working behind the benches at the women's Olympic tournament.

== Career statistics ==
=== Regular season and playoffs ===
| Season | Team | League | GP | G | A | Pts | PIM | GP | G | A | Pts | PIM |
|---|---|---|---|---|---|---|---|---|---|---|---|---|
| 1988–89 | Belleville Bulls | OHL | 25 | 0 | 3 | 3 | 2 | — | — | — | — | — |
| 1993–94 | Acadia University | AUAA | 25 | 5 | 25 | 30 | 63 | — | — | — | — | — |
| 1994–95 | Acadia University | AUAA | Statistics unavailable | | | | | | | | | |
| 1994–95 | Canada | International | 4 | 1 | 0 | 1 | 2 | — | — | — | — | — |
| 1995–96 | Canada | International | 47 | 10 | 11 | 21 | 22 | — | — | — | — | — |
| 1996–97 | Newcastle Cobras | BISL | 36 | 13 | 14 | 27 | 32 | — | — | — | — | — |
| 1997–98 | Kassel Huskies | DEL | 20 | 4 | 6 | 10 | 12 | — | — | — | — | — |
| 1997–98 | Kaufbeuren Eagles | DEL | 15 | 2 | 4 | 6 | 4 | — | — | — | — | — |
| 1998–99 | Kassel Huskies | DEL | 52 | 5 | 10 | 15 | 8 | — | — | — | — | — |
| 1999–00 | Kassel Huskies | DEL | 55 | 3 | 9 | 12 | 20 | 8 | 0 | 1 | 1 | 2 |
| 2000–01 | Kassel Huskies | DEL | 56 | 6 | 13 | 19 | 34 | 8 | 1 | 1 | 2 | 0 |
| 2001–02 | Kassel Huskies | DEL | 47 | 1 | 2 | 3 | 43 | 7 | 1 | 0 | 1 | 6 |
| 2002–03 | Kassel Huskies | DEL | 46 | 2 | 8 | 10 | 48 | 7 | 0 | 1 | 1 | 6 |
| 2003–04 | Kassel Huskies | DEL | 44 | 4 | 7 | 11 | 54 | — | — | — | — | — |
| DEL totals | | | 335 | 27 | 59 | 86 | 223 | 30 | 2 | 3 | 5 | 14 |
| Career totals (known) | | | 472 | 56 | 112 | 168 | 344 | 30 | 2 | 3 | 5 | 14 |

Statistics from HockeyDB.

== Personal life ==
MacLeod has lived in Ingolstadt, Germany, during his coaching career there. He is the father of professional ice hockey player Gregor MacLeod.
