= Germany women's national under-18 ice hockey team =

Germany
- Association: Deutscher Eishockey-Bund
- Head coach: Jeff MacLeod
- Assistants: Sebastian Jones; Henry Wellhausen
- Captain: Martina Schrick (2024)
- Most games: Tabea Botthof (20); Lilli Welcke (20); Luisa Welcke (20)
- Top scorer: Kerstin Spielberger (10); Lilli Welcke (10)
- Most points: Emily Nix (19)
- Team colors
- IIHF code: GER
Home colours	Away colours

First international
- Germany 4 – 2 Finland (Calgary, Canada; January 7, 2008)

Biggest win
- Germany 10 – 0 Great Britain (Füssen, Germany; March 29, 2014)

Biggest defeat
- Canada 15 – 0 Germany (Chicago, United States; March 28, 2010)

IIHF World Women's U18 Championships
- Appearances: 15 (first in 2008)
- Best result: 4th (first in 2010)

International record (W–L–T)
- 40–37–0

The German women's national under 18 ice hockey team (German: Deutsche U18 Frauen-Eishockeynationalmannschaft) is the national under-18 ice hockey team of Germany. The team represents Germany at the International Ice Hockey Federation's U18 Women's World Championships and other international under-18 tournaments and events.

== U18 Women's World Championship record ==
Year	GP	W	L	GF	GA	Pts	Rank
2008	5	3	2	13	17	9	5th place
2009	5	1^	4	6	27	2	6th place
2010	6	2^	4	12	39	5	4th place
2011	5	2	3	7	15	6	6th place
2012	6	2	4	10	22	6	4th place
2013	5	0	5**	9	21	2	8th place (relegated to Division I)
2014	5	4^	1	20	8	11	11th place
2015	5	2	3	20	15	6	12th place
2016	5	4^	1	19	8	11	10th place
2017	5	4	1	18	5	12	9th place (promoted to World Championships)
2018	5	2^	3	8	16	5	8th place (relegated to Division I A)
2019	5	4^	1	21	8	11	10th place
2020	5	5^	0	18	2	14	9th place (promoted to World Championships)
2022	5	1	4	8	20	3	8th place (relegated to Division I A)
2023	5	4^	1*	10	4	12	9th place (promoted to World Championships)
2024	5	0	5	2	29	0	8th place (relegated to Division I A)

^Includes one win in extra time (round robin and playoff round)
*Includes one loss in extra time (round robin)
**Includes two losses in extra time (preliminary and relegation round)

== Team ==
=== Current roster ===
Roster for the 2024 IIHF U18 Women's World Championship.

Head coach: Jeff MacLeod
Assistant coaches: Sebastian Jones, Henry Wellhausen

No.	Pos.	Name	Height	Weight	Birthdate	Team
3	D	Martina Schrick – C	1.71 m (5 ft 7 in)	67 kg (148 lb)	16 June 2006 (age 20)	(Germany) Löwen Frankfurt U20
4	D	Hanna Hoppe	1.63 m (5 ft 4 in)	60 kg (130 lb)	23 August 2006 (age 20)	(Germany) ESC Dresden U17
5	F	Theresa Zielinski	1.61 m (5 ft 3 in)	50 kg (110 lb)	10 September 2008 (age 18)	(Germany) EHC Bad Aibling U17
6	F	Felina Klare	1.73 m (5 ft 8 in)	72 kg (159 lb)	30 August 2006 (age 20)	(Germany) EC Bergkamen
8	D	Anna Kindl	1.69 m (5 ft 7 in)	85 kg (187 lb)	6 April 2006 (age 20)	(Germany) HC Landsberg U20
10	D	Elisa Pietschmann – A	1.70 m (5 ft 7 in)	70 kg (150 lb)	7 January 2006 (age 20)	(Germany) Eisbären Juniors Berlin
11	F	Anastasia Gruß	1.65 m (5 ft 5 in)	69 kg (152 lb)	11 December 2006 (age 19)	(Germany) ETC Crimmitschau U17
12	F	Anabel Seyrer	1.63 m (5 ft 4 in)	50 kg (110 lb)	22 April 2008 (age 18)	(Germany) HC Landsberg U17
13	F	Hanna Weichenhain	1.67 m (5 ft 6 in)	54 kg (119 lb)	18 October 2008 (age 18)	(Germany) EV Lindau U17
14	F	Felicitas Bergmann	1.79 m (5 ft 10 in)	62 kg (137 lb)	4 March 2007 (age 19)	(Germany) Eisbaren Juniors Berlin
15	D	Emilija Birka	1.63 m (5 ft 4 in)	55 kg (121 lb)	26 March 2009 (age 17)	(Germany) EC Bad Tolz U15
16	F	Emmi-Lee Hanack	1.61 m (5 ft 3 in)	63 kg (139 lb)	30 November 2006 (age 19)	(Canada) North York Storm
17	D	Annabell Manns	1.60 m (5 ft 3 in)	55 kg (121 lb)	14 May 2007 (age 19)	(Germany) ES Weißwasser U15
19	F	Anna Rose – A	1.63 m (5 ft 4 in)	60 kg (130 lb)	28 September 2006 (age 20)	(Germany) HC Landsberg U17
20	F	Amelie Rosenstock	1.70 m (5 ft 7 in)	62 kg (137 lb)	20 July 2007 (age 19)	(Germany) EHC Straubing U17
22	D	Lara Georgi	1.68 m (5 ft 6 in)	62 kg (137 lb)	29 June 2007 (age 19)	(Germany) EHC Bayreuth U15
23	F	Riley del Monte	1.58 m (5 ft 2 in)	60 kg (130 lb)	27 February 2006 (age 20)	(Canada) North York Storm
24	F	Charleen Poindl	1.69 m (5 ft 7 in)	73 kg (161 lb)	2 January 2009 (age 17)	(Germany) ES Weißwasser U15
25	F	Amy-Michelle Plaumann	1.63 m (5 ft 4 in)	58 kg (128 lb)	22 October 2007 (age 19)	(Germany) Eisbaren Juniors Berlin
28	F	Mathilda Heine	1.68 m (5 ft 6 in)	58 kg (128 lb)	18 February 2009 (age 17)	(Germany) ETC Crimmitschau U15
29	G	Hannah Loist	1.71 m (5 ft 7 in)	63 kg (139 lb)	18 July 2007 (age 19)	(Germany) Grizzlys Wolfsburg U17
30	G	Miriam Siebert	1.69 m (5 ft 7 in)	58 kg (128 lb)	31 January 2006 (age 20)	(Germany) EHC Klostersee U20

=== Head coaches ===
- Peter Kathan, 2007–08
- Werner Schneider, 2008–09
- Peter Kathan, 2009–10
- Werner Schneider, 2010–11
- Maritta Becker, 2011–2013
- Benjamin Hinterstocker, 2013–14
- Peter Kathan, 2014–15
- Thomas Kettner, 2015–2018
- Franziska Busch, 2018–2023
- Jeff MacLeod, 2023–
