= Poland women's national under-18 ice hockey team =

Poland
- The Coat of arms of Poland is the badge used on the players jerseys.
- Nickname: The Eagles
- Association: Polski Związek Hokeja na Lodzie
- Head coach: (Poland) Grzegorz Klich
- Assistants: (Poland) Tomasz Kowalczyk (Poland) Pawel Mateja
- Captain: Wiktoria Gogoc
- Most games: Wiktoria Gogoc (19); Klaudia Kaleja (19); Natalia Kaminska (19); Anna Sopata (19); Katarzyna Wybiral (19)
- Top scorer: Kamila Wieczorek (17)
- Most points: Kamila Wieczorek (24)
- IIHF code: POL

First international
- Poland 2 – 1 Italy (Krynica-Zdrój, Poland; 18 March 2014)

Biggest win
- Poland 11 – 0 Australia (Radenthein, Austria; 7 January 2016)

Biggest defeat
- Denmark 5 – 0 Poland (Katowice, Poland; 12 January 2025)

IIHF World Women's U18 Championships - Division I B
- Appearances: 10 (first in 2014)
- Best result: 2nd (2014, 2022, 2023)

International record (W–L–T)
- 25–21–0

The Poland women's national under–18 ice hockey team is the national under-18 ice hockey team of Poland. The team represents Poland at the International Ice Hockey Federation's World Women's U18 Division I Qualification.

== World Women's U18 Championship record ==
Year	GP	W	L	GF	GA	Pts	Rank
2014	4	3*	1	13	8	8	16th place
2015	5	3	2	21	12	9	17th place
2016	4	1	3	16	12	3	20th place
2017	5	3*	2	7	6	8	17th place
2018	5	3	2	17	9	9	17th place
2019	5	3*	2	12	14	8	18th place
2020	5	1	4^	8	9	4	19th place
2022	4	2	2^	5	8	7	15th place
2023	4	3	1	15	3	9	16th place
2024	5	3	2	21	13	9	17th place

* Including one win in extra time
^ Including one loss in extra time
