= Italy women's national under-18 ice hockey team =

- Association: Federazione Italiana Sport del Ghiaccio
- Head coach: Massimo Fedrizzi
- Assistants: Luca Giacomuzzi; Simon Stuffer
- Captain: Matilde Fantin (2024)
- Most games: Aurora Abatangelo (20); Anna Caumo (20); Eva Maria Grunser (20); Sara Magnanini (20); Elena Perathoner (20)
- Top scorer: Anita Muraro (17)
- Most points: Nadia Mattivi (27)
- Team colors
- IIHF code: ITA

First international
- Italy 12 – 0 Kazakhstan (Asiago, Italy; 29 November 2011)

Biggest win
- Italy 12 – 0 Kazakhstan (Asiago, Italy; 29 November 2011)

Biggest defeat
- Japan 10 – 1 Italy (Ritten, Italy; 18 January 2026)

IIHF Women's World U18 Championship
- Appearances: 11 (first in 2012)
- Best result: 10th (2023)

International record (W–L–T)
- 20–13–0

The Italy women's national under-18 ice hockey team is the women's national under-18 ice hockey team of Italy. The team is controlled by the Federazione Italiana Sport del Ghiaccio, a member of the International Ice Hockey Federation.

== U18 Women's World Championship record ==
The Italy women's national under-18 ice hockey team played its first game in 2011 against Kazakhstan during the 2012 IIHF World Women's U18 Championship Division I Qualification being held in Asiago, Italy. Italy won the game 12-0 which would also be recorded as their largest win in international participation. Italy finished the tournament in fourth place, after managing only two wins out of their five games, and failed to qualify for the upcoming 2012 Division I tournament. During the tournament they suffered a 0–6 defeat against Hungary which is to date their largest loss in international competition.

Year	GP	W	OTW	OTL	L	GF	GA	Pts	Rank
2012	5	2	0	1	2	21	14	7	16th place (4th in Division I Qualification)
2013	5	2	1	1	2	5	10	9	16th place (4th in Division I Qualification)
2014	4	0	1	1	2	5	12	3	18th place (4th in Division I Qualification)
2015	5	4	0	0	1	11	8	12	16th place (2nd in Division I Qualification)
2016	4	3	0	0	1	17	6	9	16th place (2nd in Division I Qualification)
2017	5	5	0	0	0	17	3	15	15th place (1st in Division I Group B)
2018	5	2	0	1	2	13	14	7	11th place (3rd in Division I Group A)
2019	5	1	1	1	2	9	16	6	12th place (4th in Division I Group A)
2020	5	1	1	0	3	0	0	0	13th (5th in Division I Group A)
~~2021~~	Cancelled due to the COVID-19 pandemic								
2022	4	0	2	1	1	7	9	5	11th (3rd in Division I Group A)
2023	5	2	1	1	1	8	5	9	10th (2nd in Division I Group A)
2024	5	3	0	1	1	15	13	10	10th (2nd in Division I Group A)
2025	5	4	0	0	1	12	9	12	10th (2nd in Division I Group A)
2026	5	0	0	0	5	5	27	0	14th (6th in Division I Group A)

== Team ==
=== Current roster ===
Roster for the 2024 IIHF U18 Women's World U18 Championship Division I Group A.

Head coach: Massimo Fedrizzi
Assistant coaches: Luca Giacomuzzi, Simon Stuffer

No.	Pos.	Name	Height	Weight	Birthdate	Team
2	F	Chiara Carioti	1.55 m (5 ft 1 in)	51 kg (112 lb)	7 November 2007 (age 18)	(Italy) HC Milano Devils U16
3	D	Maddalena Bedont	1.71 m (5 ft 7 in)	69 kg (152 lb)	6 January 2008 (age 18)	(Italy) Bolzano Eagles
6	D	Olivia Cambruzzi – A	1.70 m (5 ft 7 in)	65 kg (143 lb)	12 February 2007 (age 19)	(Italy) Padova Waves U19
7	D	Arianna Novati	1.63 m (5 ft 4 in)	54 kg (119 lb)	14 September 2009 (age 17)	(Switzerland) HC Ladies Lugano
9	F	Annalisa Giuliani	1.61 m (5 ft 3 in)	49 kg (108 lb)	29 June 2007 (age 19)	(Italy) HC Trento U16
10	F	Manuela Heidenberger	1.62 m (5 ft 4 in)	48 kg (106 lb)	15 September 2007 (age 19)	(Italy) Bolzano Eagles
11	D	Aurora Varesco	1.70 m (5 ft 7 in)	68 kg (150 lb)	29 October 2008 (age 17)	(Italy) Fiemme HC U16
12	F	Giorgia Todesco	1.63 m (5 ft 4 in)	54 kg (119 lb)	8 March 2009 (age 17)	(Italy) Bolzano Eagles
13	D	Laura Lobis – A	1.67 m (5 ft 6 in)	67 kg (148 lb)	25 March 2006 (age 20)	(Sweden) Färjestad BK
14	F	Alessandra Weber	1.56 m (5 ft 1 in)	46 kg (101 lb)	26 February 2006 (age 20)	(Italy) Bolzano Eagles
15	F	Eleonora Trombetta	1.57 m (5 ft 2 in)	52 kg (115 lb)	26 April 2006 (age 20)	(Italy) HC Pinerolo U16
16	D	Aurora de Fanti	1.70 m (5 ft 7 in)	61 kg (134 lb)	27 March 2008 (age 18)	(Italy) USG Zoldo U16
17	F	Matilde Fantin – C	1.70 m (5 ft 7 in)	67 kg (148 lb)	1 January 2007 (age 19)	(Switzerland) HC Lugano U17
18	F	Sina Miribung	1.61 m (5 ft 3 in)	64 kg (141 lb)	31 March 2006 (age 20)	(Italy) Bolzano Eagles
19	F	Eleonora Pisetta	1.67 m (5 ft 6 in)	57 kg (126 lb)	17 December 2008 (age 17)	(Italy) HC Pinè U16
20	G	Anna Corte Sualon	1.63 m (5 ft 4 in)	59 kg (130 lb)	2 March 2007 (age 19)	(Italy) SG Cortina U17
21	F	Olivia de Bortoli	1.59 m (5 ft 3 in)	47 kg (104 lb)	18 January 2008 (age 18)	(Italy) HC Feltreghiaccio U16
22	F	Carlotta Mellarè	1.58 m (5 ft 2 in)	49 kg (108 lb)	22 August 2008 (age 18)	(Italy) SG Cortina U16
24	F	Nicole Varesco	1.70 m (5 ft 7 in)	67 kg (148 lb)	29 October 2008 (age 17)	(Italy) Fiemme HC U16
25	G	Margherita Ostoni	1.66 m (5 ft 5 in)	62 kg (137 lb)	1 July 2006 (age 20)	(Italy) HC Piemont Rebelles
