= Denmark women's national under-18 ice hockey team =

Denmark
- Nickname: Danske Løver ('Danish Lions')
- Association: Danmarks Ishockey Union
- General manager: Diana Bluthgen
- Head coach: Mikkel Ry Nielsen
- Assistants: Nickolai Thrysøe; Birgitte Nordström; Loui Rasmussen
- Captain: Natasja Luplau (2024)
- Most games: 6 players (20): Sofie Damgaard; Lilli Friis-Hansen; Signe Jensen; Julie Oksbjerg; Amanda Refsgaard; Sofie Skott Dahl
- Top scorer: Michelle Weis (8)
- Most points: Lilli Friis-Hansen (18)
- IIHF code: DEN

First international
- Denmark 9 – 0 Great Britain (Katowice, Poland; 19 January 2015)

Biggest win
- Denmark 10 – 0 China (Katowice, Poland; 7 January 2018)

Biggest defeat
- Japan 7 – 0 Denmark (Füssen, Germany; 6 January 2020)

IIHF World Women's U18 Championships - Division I A
- Appearances: 3 (first in 2016)
- Best result: 5th (2019)

International record (W–L–T)
- 20–23–0

The Denmark women's national under–18 ice hockey team is the national under-18 ice hockey team of Denmark. The team represents Denmark at the International Ice Hockey Federation's U18 Women's World Championship and other international under-18 tournaments and events.

== U18 Women's World Championship record ==
Denmark made its IIHF U18 Women's World Championship debut in the 2015 Division I Qualification tournament, where the team achieved a first place finish and gained promotion to Division I. Thereafter, team has competed at the Division I level, regularly moving between Group A and Group B.

Year	GP	W	L	GF	GA	Pts	Rank
(Poland) 2015	5	5	0	29	2	15	15th place (1st in Division I Qualification, Promoted to Division I)
(Hungary) 2016	5	0	5	2	20	0	14th place (6th in Division I, Relegated to Division I B)
(Poland) 2017	5	4	1	15	6	12	16th place (2nd in Division I B)
(Poland) 2018	5	5	0	30	3	15	15th place (1st in Division I B, Promoted to Division I A)
(Austria) 2019	5	1	4^	9	15	4	13th place (5th in Division I A)
(Germany) 2020	5	0	5^	5	20	1	14th place (6th in Division I A, Relegated to Division I B)
(Austria) 2022	4	1	3	7	7	3	18th place (5th in Division I B)
(Poland) 2023	4	4	0	19	3	12	15th place (1st in Division I B, Promoted to Division I A)
(Italy) 2024	5	0	5^	6	18	1	14th place (6th in Division I A, Relegated to Division I B)
(Poland) 2025	5	5	0	27	2	15	15th place (1st in Division I B, Promoted to Division I A)

^Includes one loss in extra time (in the preliminary round)

== Team ==
=== Current roster ===
Roster for the 2024 IIHF U18 Women's World Championship Division I Group A.

Head coach: Mikkel Ry Nielsen
Assistant coaches: Nickolai Thrysøe, Birgitte Mohrsen Nordström, Loui Rasmussen

No.	Pos.	Name	Height	Weight	Birthdate	Team
2	F	Olivia Ranum	1.69 m (5 ft 7 in)	58 kg (128 lb)	18 May 2008 (age 18)	(Denmark) AaB Aalborg U17
3	F	Olivia Olesen	1.64 m (5 ft 5 in)	60 kg (130 lb)	28 April 2009 (age 17)	(United States) Bishop Kearney Selects U16
4	D	Olivia Lundmark	1.70 m (5 ft 7 in)	60 kg (130 lb)	14 November 2008 (age 17)	(Denmark) Rødovre SIK
6	F	Angelina Sloth	1.67 m (5 ft 6 in)	57 kg (126 lb)	24 October 2009 (age 16)	(Denmark) Hvidovre IK
7	F	Ida Søndergaard	1.72 m (5 ft 8 in)	60 kg (130 lb)	18 September 2006 (age 19)	(Sweden) Rögle BK
8	D	My Lau	1.74 m (5 ft 9 in)	64 kg (141 lb)	12 August 2006 (age 19)	(Sweden) Rögle BK
9	F	Silke Heeris	1.62 m (5 ft 4 in)	50 kg (110 lb)	12 October 2008 (age 17)	(Denmark) Rødovre SIK
10	F	Mathilde Florentz	1.55 m (5 ft 1 in)	60 kg (130 lb)	28 October 2007 (age 18)	(Denmark) Hvidovre IK
11	D	Silja Rasmussen – A	1.75 m (5 ft 9 in)	69 kg (152 lb)	16 February 2007 (age 19)	(Denmark) Rødovre SIK
12	D	Natasja Luplau – C	1.68 m (5 ft 6 in)	59 kg (130 lb)	8 September 2006 (age 19)	(Denmark) Rødovre SIK
14	F	Alma Madsen-Mygdal	1.65 m (5 ft 5 in)	55 kg (121 lb)	31 October 2007 (age 18)	(Denmark) Hvidovre IK
15	F	Nikita Bergmann	1.79 m (5 ft 10 in)	63 kg (139 lb)	25 August 2008 (age 17)	(Denmark) Rødovre SIK
16	D	Rebecca Helms	1.73 m (5 ft 8 in)	67 kg (148 lb)	15 February 2006 (age 20)	(Denmark) Rødovre SIK
18	D	Klara Holm – A	1.69 m (5 ft 7 in)	65 kg (143 lb)	29 July 2007 (age 18)	(Denmark) Hvidovre IK
19	F	Fie Pouls	1.68 m (5 ft 6 in)	55 kg (121 lb)	7 July 2008 (age 17)	(Denmark) Herning IK U16
20	G	Mila Petersen	1.71 m (5 ft 7 in)	60 kg (130 lb)	17 December 2008 (age 17)	(Denmark) Rødovre SIK
21	F	Victoria Dahlmann	1.63 m (5 ft 4 in)	53 kg (117 lb)	5 June 2007 (age 19)	(Denmark) Rødovre SIK
23	F	Frida Mogensen	1.70 m (5 ft 7 in)	66 kg (146 lb)	22 February 2008 (age 18)	(Denmark) Odense IK
24	F	Freya Ekberg	1.63 m (5 ft 4 in)	54 kg (119 lb)	12 May 2009 (age 17)	(Denmark) Rødovre SIK
25	G	Anja Poulsen	1.69 m (5 ft 7 in)	64 kg (141 lb)	12 November 2008 (age 17)	(Denmark) Rødovre SIK

- Team average height: 1.68 m (5 ft 6 in)
- Team average weight: 60 kg (130 lb)
- Team average age: 15 years

=== Head coach history ===
- Bjorn Peters, 2014–2022
- Mikkel Ry Nielsen, 2022–

== See also ==
- Denmark women's national ice hockey team
- KvindeLigaen
- Nationella Damhockeyligan
