= Great Britain women's national under-18 ice hockey team =

Great Britain
- Association: Ice Hockey UK
- General manager: (United Kingdom) Claire Rowbotham
- Head coach: (United Kingdom) Angela Taylor
- Assistants: (United Kingdom) Jenny Hehir (United Kingdom) Nic Lazarczuk
- Captain: Amy Trueman
- Most games: Shannon Douglas (19); Reagan Downing (19); Casey Traill (19)
- Top scorer: Saffron Allen (11)
- Most points: Saffron Allen (22)
- Team colors
- IIHF code: GBR

First international
- Great Britain 3 – 1 France (Asiago, Italy; 29 November 2011)

Biggest win
- Great Britain 16 – 1 New Zealand (Riga, Latvia; 23 January 2025)

Biggest defeat
- Germany 10 – 0 Great Britain (Füssen, Germany; 29 March 2014)

IIHF World Women's U18 Championships - Division IA
- Appearances: 2 (first in 2012)
- Best result: 5th (2012)

International record (W–L–T)
- 23–36–0

The Great Britain women's national under-18 ice hockey team is the women's national under-18 ice hockey team of the United Kingdom. The team is controlled by Ice Hockey UK, a member of the International Ice Hockey Federation and currently plays in Division I of the IIHF World Women's U18 Championships.

== History ==
The Great Britain women's national under-18 ice hockey team played its first game in 2011 against France during the 2012 IIHF World Women's U18 Championship Division I Qualification being held in Asiago, Italy. Great Britain won the game 3–1 and finished second in the tournament earning one of the two qualification spots in the 2012 IIHF World Women's U18 Championship Division I tournament along with Hungary who finished first in the qualification tournament. During the qualification tournament Great Britain recorded their largest-ever victory in international participation when they defeated Kazakhstan 8–0. They also recorded their largest loss when they were defeated by Hungary 1–8. During December 2011 to January 2012, Great Britain competed in the 2012 Division I tournament being held in Tromsø, Norway. They lost four of their five games during the tournament winning only against Slovakia 4–1.

== World Women's U18 Championship record ==
Year	GP	W	L	GF	GA	Pts	Rank
2012	10	4^	6*	29	30	12	13th place (Relegated to Division I - Qualification)
2013	5	3	2	21	9	9	15th place (Promoted to Division I)
2014	5	0	5	4	31	0	14th place (Relegated to Division I - Qualification)
2015	5	0	5	3	18	0	20th place
2016	4	2	2	7	8	6	18th place
2017	5	2^	3	8	13	5	18th place
2018	5	1	4	7	15	3	19th place
2019	5	3^	2*	7	7	9	17th place
2020	5	1	4*	5	18	4	20th place (Relegated to Division IIA)
2022	5	3^	2	15	8	8	20th place
2023	5	3	2*	11	8	10	23rd place
2024	5	4	1	22	7	12	22nd place
2025	5	5	0	35	6	15	21st place (Promoted to Division IB)
2026	5	2	3	9	13	6	18th place

^Includes one win in extra time (in the round robin)
*Includes one loss in extra time (in the round robin)

== Team roster ==
From the 2012 IIHF World Women's U18 Championship Division I

#	Name	Pos	Date of birth	Club
12	Louise Adams	F	24 November 1995	(United Kingdom) Guildford Lightning
6	Saffron Allen (A)	F	28 March 1995	(United Kingdom) Sheffield Shadows
4	Lorna Beresford	F	4 August 1996	(United Kingdom) Sutton Sting
14	Judith Browne	F	7 July 1995	(United Kingdom) Kingston Diamonds
15	Amy Campbell	F	3 May 1994	(United Kingdom) Whitley Bay Squaws
7	Jessica Curtis	D	19 January 1996	(United Kingdom) Bracknell Ice Bees
3	Helen Emerson	D	18 December 1995	(United Kingdom) Billingham Stars
2	Samantha Emerson	D	23 February 1995	(United Kingdom) Billingham Stars
25	Beatrice Fletcher	G	10 January 1994	(United Kingdom) Blackburn Thunder
17	Katherine Gale (C)	F	6 June 1994	(United Kingdom) Bracknell Queen Bees
24	Paige Henry	F	10 July 1994	(United Kingdom) Solihull Vixens
19	Lily Highgate	F	7 June 1994	(United Kingdom) Bracknell Queen Bees
9	Shannon Jones	F	21 April 1997	(United Kingdom) Kingston Diamonds
22	Kirsty Lake	D	25 April 1994	(United Kingdom) Bracknell Fire Bees
16	Louisa Lippiatt Durnell	F	9 March 1995	(United Kingdom) Guildford Lightning
10	Monica Petrosino	F	27 February 1994	(United Kingdom) Bracknell Queen Bees
1	Rachel Pullen	G	1 April 1994	(United Kingdom) Swindon Topcats
18	Emma Sanders	D	13 April 1995	(United Kingdom) Nottingham Vipers
23	Bethany Scoon (A)	D	5 April 1995	(United Kingdom) Kingston Diamonds
5	Ruth Wallace	F	19 July 1994	(United Kingdom) North Ayrshire Devils
