= Radenthein =

- Municipality
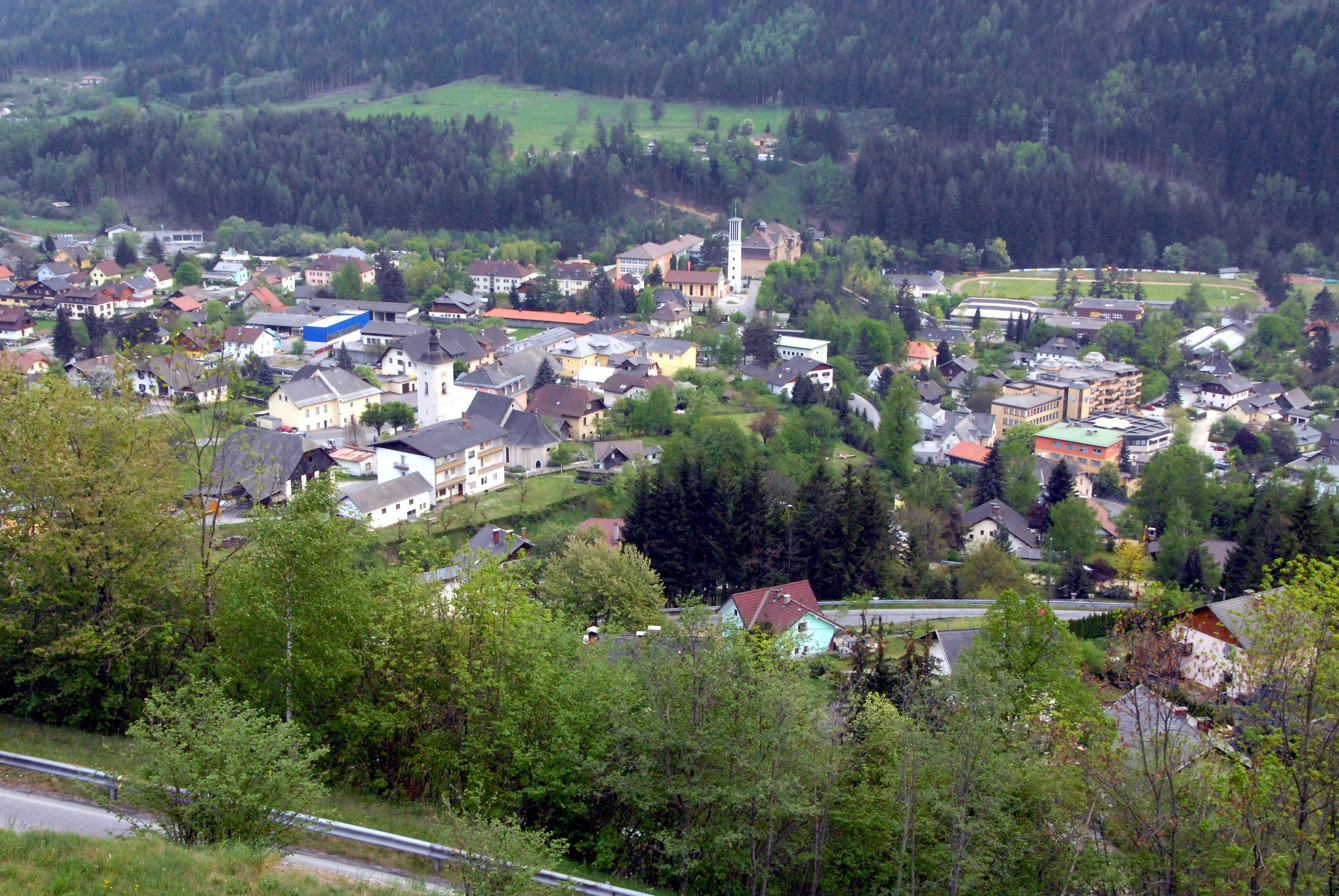

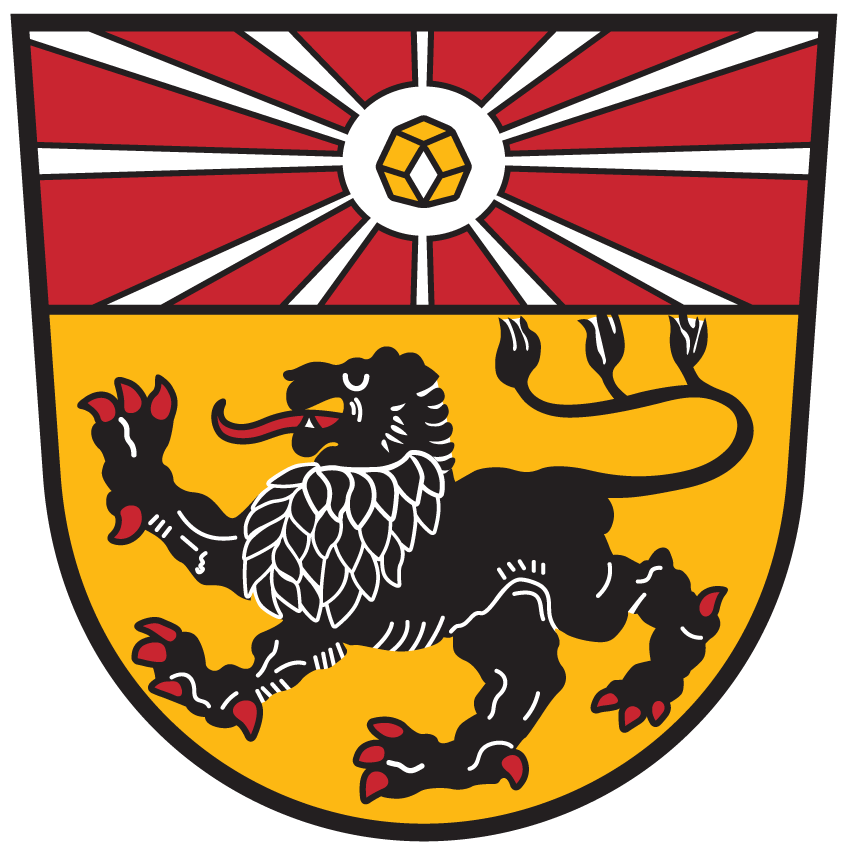
- Coat of arms

- Location within Austria
- Coordinates: 46°48′N 13°42′E
- Country: Austria
- State: Carinthia
- District: Spittal an der Drau

Government
  - Mayor: Armin Egger (Ind.)

Area
  - Total: 89.34 km^{2} (34.49 sq mi)
- Elevation: 746 m (2,448 ft)

Population (2018-01-01)
  - Total: 5,831
  - Density: 65.27/km^{2} (169.0/sq mi)
- Time zone: UTC+1 (CET)
  - Summer (DST): UTC+2 (CEST)
- Postal code: 9545
- Area code: 04246
- Vehicle registration: SP
- Website: www.radenthein.gv.at

Radenthein (Slovene: Radenče) is a town in Spittal an der Drau District, in the Austrian state of Carinthia.

== Geography ==
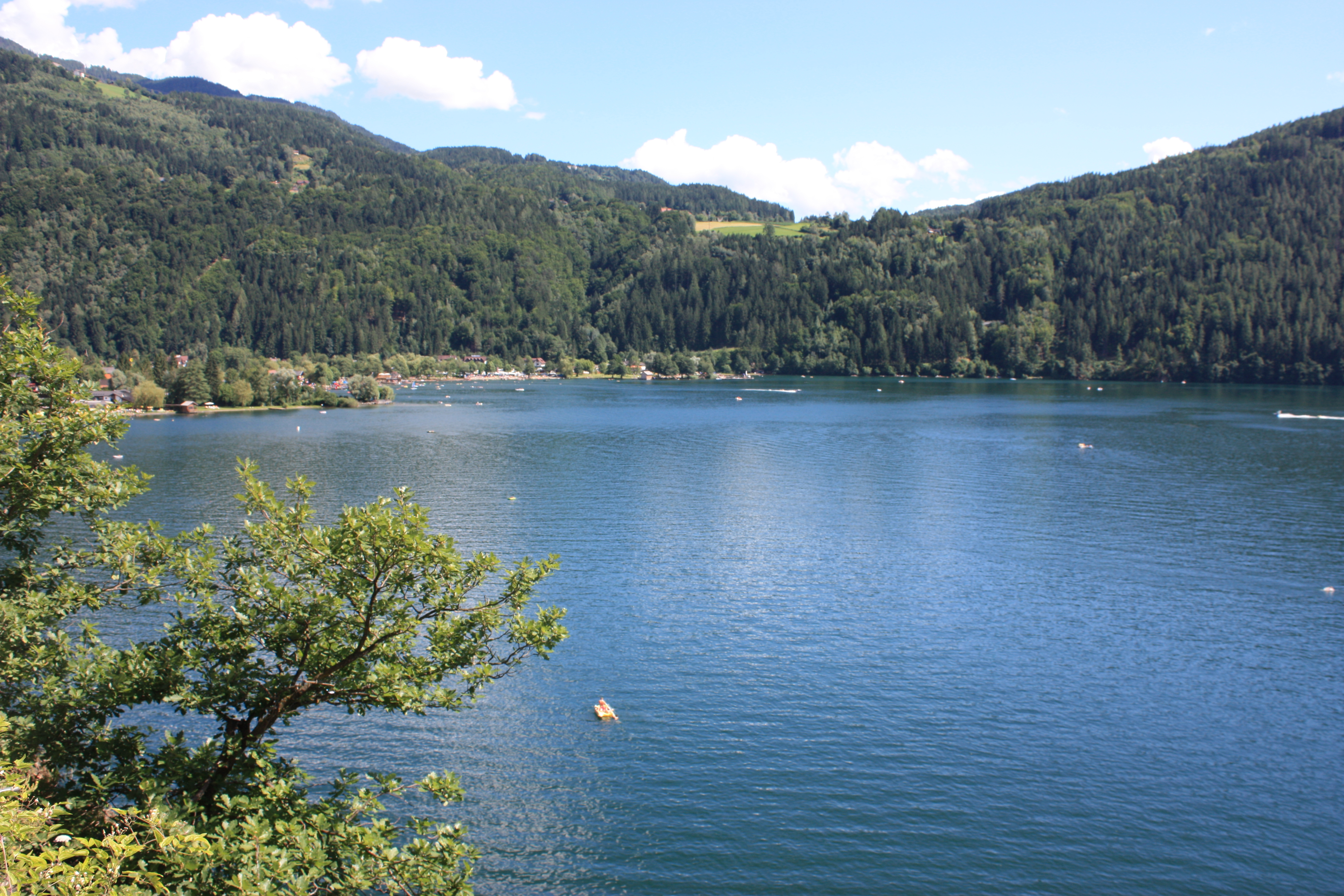
Lakeside in Döbriach

The town is situated in the Gegend valley (Gegendtal) of the Nock Mountains range (part of the Gurktal Alps), stretching to the eastern shore of Lake Millstatt. Radenthein borders on the municipalities of Millstatt in the west and Bad Kleinkirchheim in the east.

The municipal area comprises the cadastral communities of Döbriach, Kaning, Laufenberg, Radenthein proper, Sankt Peter, and Tweng.

== History ==
The remote, densely forested valley was not colonized until about 1000. A chapel at villam Ratehtim was first mentioned in an 1177 deed, then part of the Millstatt Abbey estates within the Duchy of Carinthia; it was raised to a parish in 1262. Since the Middle Ages Radenthein had been an iron ore and garnet mining area and the site of a finery forge, even the use of reverberatory furnaces is documented since the late 18th century. When about 1908 an extensive occurrence of magnesite was discovered and the foundation of the "Austro-American Magnesite" mining company led to a large increase in population. The municipality obtained the status of a town in 1995.

The mining company (now RHI AG at Vienna producing refractory materials) is still the main employer. Besides which, there is considerable hotel and tourist trade in Döbriach on the lakeside of the Millstätter See. A museum (Granatium) documents the local history of garnet mining.

== Politics ==
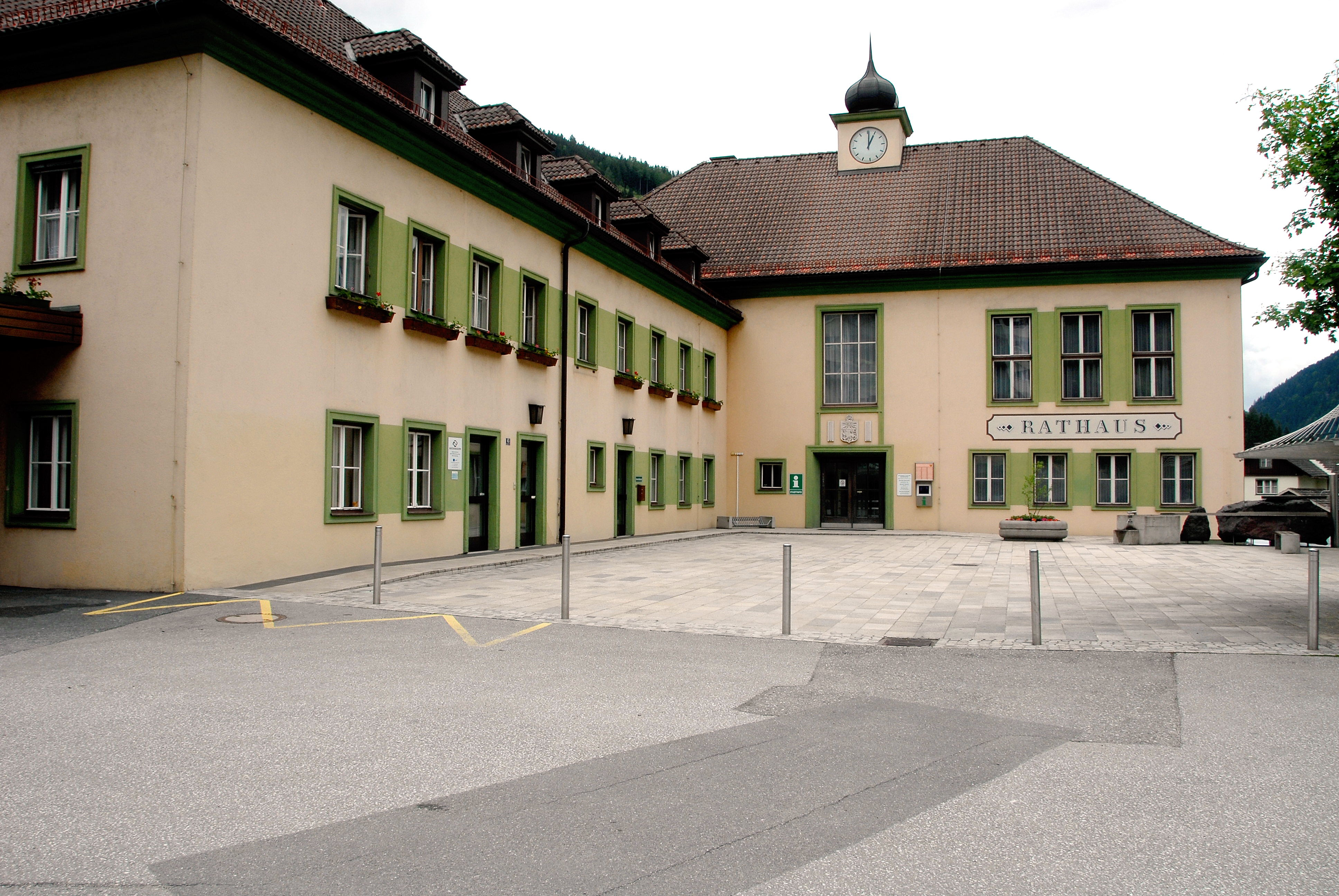
Town hall

Seats in the municipal assembly (Gemeinderat) as of 2015 elections:

- MAIER (independent): 11
- Social Democratic Party of Austria (SPÖ):10
- Freedom Party of Austria (FPÖ): 3
- LMW (independent): 2
- The Greens – The Green Alternative: 1

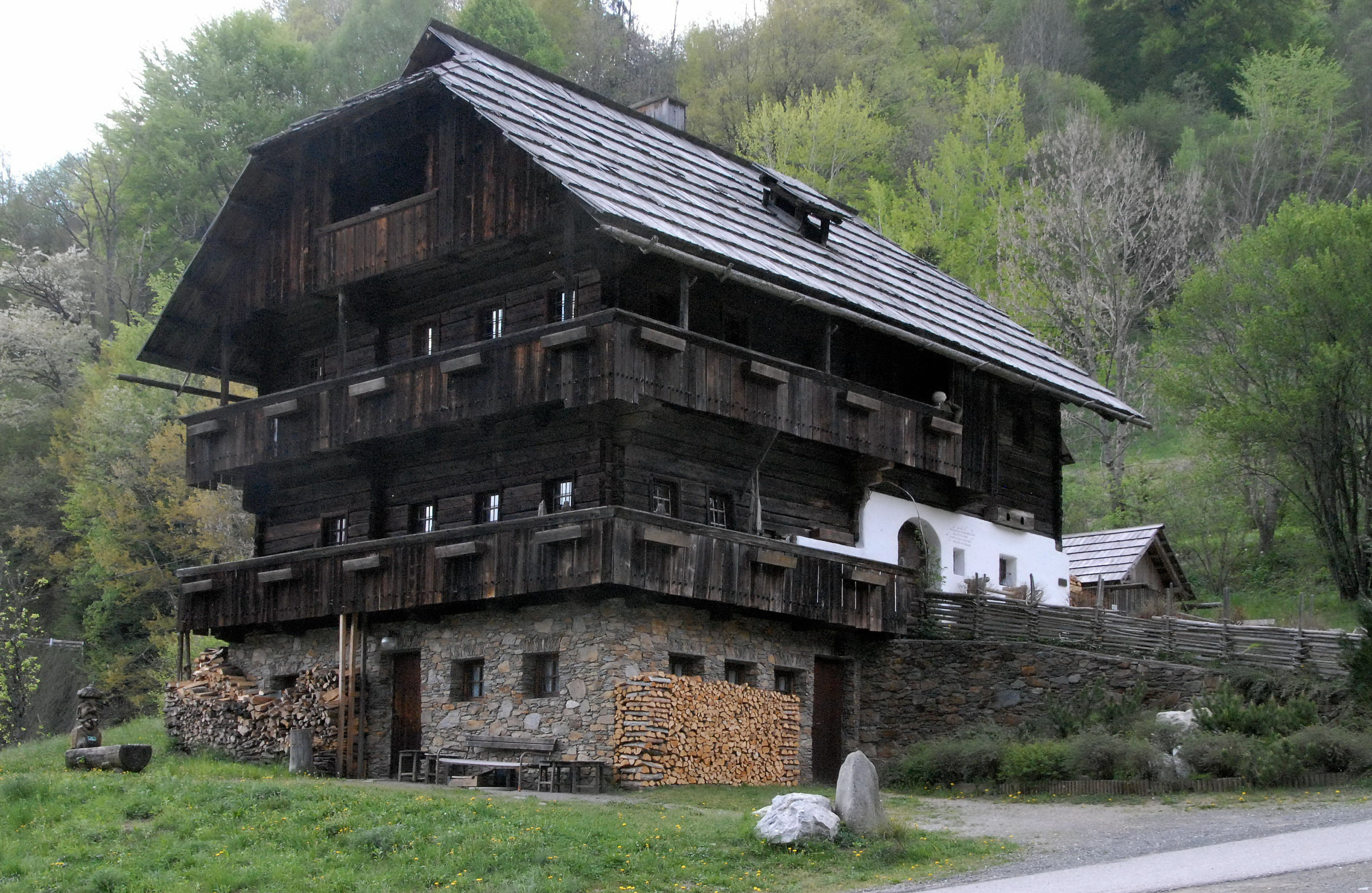
Türkhaus museum at Kaning http://www.kaninger-muehlenweg.com/

== International relations ==
=== Twin towns — Sister cities ===
Radenthein is twinned with:

- Weiler/Rems, Schorndorf, Germany
- Ampezzo, Italy
