= Hungary women's national under-18 ice hockey team =

Hungary
- Nickname: Magyar
- Association: Hungarian Ice Hockey Federation
- General manager: Zsuzsanna Kolbenheyer
- Head coach: Botond Bedő
- Assistants: Delaney Collins; Zoltán Fodor; Norbert Zaka
- Captain: Boglárka Báhiczki-Tóth (2025)
- Most games: Rebeka Ungár (25)
- Top scorer: Alexandra Huszák (18)
- Most points: Alexandra Huszák (27)
- Team colors
- IIHF code: HUN

First international
- Hungary 10 – 1 China (Asiago, Italy; November 29, 2011)

Biggest win
- Hungary 10 – 1 China (Asiago, Italy; November 29, 2011)

Biggest defeat
- Canada 14 – 0 Hungary (Membertou, Canada; 12 January 2026)

IIHF World Women's U18 Championships
- Appearances: 2 (first in 2013)
- Best result: 6th (2013)

International record (W–L–T)
- 17–23–0

The Hungarian women's national under 18 ice hockey team (Hungarian: Magyarország női U18-as jégkorong válogatott) is the national under-18 ice hockey team in Hungary. The team represents Hungary at the International Ice Hockey Federation's IIHF U18 Women's World Championship and other international under-18 tournaments and events.

== U18 Women's World Championship record ==
Year	GP	W	L	GF	GA	Pts	Rank
2012	10	10*	0	61	14	29	9th place (1st in Division 1, Promoted to Top Division)
2013	5	1*	4	4	16	2	6th place
2014	5	0	5	5	25	0	8th place (Relegated to Division I A)
2015	5	2	3	10	13	6	13th place (5th in Division I A)
2016	5	1	4	4	24	3	13th place (5th in Division I)
2017	5	2	3	9	13	6	12th place (4th in Division I A)
2018	5	1	4^	8	18	4	13th place (5th in Division I A)
2019	5	3	2^	13	9	10	11th place (3rd in Division I A)

*Includes one win in extra time (in the preliminary round)
^Includes one loss in extra time (in the preliminary round)

== Team ==
=== Current roster ===
Roster for the 2025 IIHF U18 Women's World Championship Division I Group A, played 5 to 11 January 2025 in Budapest, Hungary.

Head coach: Botond Bedő
Assistant coaches: Delaney Collins, Zoltán Fodor, Norbert Zaka (goaltender)

No.	Pos.	Name	Height	Weight	Birthdate	Team
1	G	Noémi Takács	1.67 m (5 ft 6 in)	67 kg (148 lb)	27 September 2008 (age 18)	(Hungary) MAC Budapest
2	D	Luca Faragó	1.70 m (5 ft 7 in)	58 kg (128 lb)	13 October 2009 (age 16)	(Hungary) Ajkai Óriások JSE
4	F	Dalma Gergely – A	1.72 m (5 ft 8 in)	66 kg (146 lb)	28 September 2007 (age 19)	(Hungary) Budapest JA HC
5	D	Kata Schneider	1.63 m (5 ft 4 in)	69 kg (152 lb)	24 August 2009 (age 17)	(Hungary) Budapest JA HC
6	D	Lili Hajdu	1.75 m (5 ft 9 in)	69 kg (152 lb)	6 January 2009 (age 17)	(Hungary) Budapest JA HC
7	F	Petra Polónyi	1.70 m (5 ft 7 in)	65 kg (143 lb)	25 September 2008 (age 18)	(Canada) OHA Mavericks Tardiff
8	F	Boróka Bátyi	1.64 m (5 ft 5 in)	62 kg (137 lb)	7 March 2008 (age 18)	(Hungary) Budapest JA HC
9	F	Krisztina Weiler	1.64 m (5 ft 5 in)	65 kg (143 lb)	1 January 2008 (age 18)	(Canada) OHA Mavericks Tardiff
10	F	Réka Hiezl	1.69 m (5 ft 7 in)	70 kg (150 lb)	10 June 2009 (age 17)	(Hungary) Vasas Budapest U16
11	D	Boglárka Báhiczki-Tóth – C	1.82 m (6 ft 0 in)	80 kg (180 lb)	11 October 2007 (age 18)	(Canada) Purcell Hockey Academy
12	F	Blanka Bereczki	1.66 m (5 ft 5 in)	64 kg (141 lb)	26 October 2007 (age 18)	(Hungary) Budapest JA HC
13	F	Dóra Bereczki	1.64 m (5 ft 5 in)	58 kg (128 lb)	7 January 2009 (age 17)	(Hungary) Budapest JA HC
14	D	Boglárka Koncz – A	1.72 m (5 ft 8 in)	58 kg (128 lb)	14 May 2007 (age 19)	(Hungary) HK Budapest
15	F	Lara Sághy	1.74 m (5 ft 9 in)	73 kg (161 lb)	27 March 2009 (age 17)	(Hungary) Budapest JA HC
16	F	Flóra Pásztor	1.74 m (5 ft 9 in)	82 kg (181 lb)	5 December 2007 (age 18)	(Canada) Purcell Hockey Academy
17	D	Anna Kornyilov	1.67 m (5 ft 6 in)	59 kg (130 lb)	7 January 2007 (age 19)	(Hungary) MAC Budapest
18	D	Bonita Szabó	1.60 m (5 ft 3 in)	61 kg (134 lb)	25 August 2008 (age 18)	(Austria) SC Rheintal Future
20	G	Csenge Csordás	1.80 m (5 ft 11 in)	62 kg (137 lb)	27 September 2009 (age 17)	(Hungary) Kaposvári SI
21	F	Nikolett Fehér	1.68 m (5 ft 6 in)	63 kg (139 lb)	6 January 2007 (age 19)	(Hungary) HK Budapest
23	D	Bíborka Simon	1.77 m (5 ft 10 in)	81 kg (179 lb)	25 June 2008 (age 18)	(Hungary) MAC Budapest
24	D	Lorina Haraszt	1.64 m (5 ft 5 in)	62 kg (137 lb)	5 March 2008 (age 18)	(Hungary) Ifj. Ocskay Gábor JA
25	G	Helga Milibák	1.75 m (5 ft 9 in)	80 kg (180 lb)	23 October 2007 (age 18)	(Hungary) Budapest JA HC
26	F	Berta Mozolai	1.68 m (5 ft 6 in)	56 kg (123 lb)	13 March 2007 (age 19)	(Canada) Stanstead College

Team biometrics

- Average age: 16 years
- Average height: 1.70 m (5 ft 7 in)
- Average weight: 67 kg (148 lb)

=== Head coach history ===
- Csaba Gömöri, 2011–2014
- Marton Tibor, 2014–15
- Norbert Buzás, 2015–2017
- András Kis, 2017–18
- Botond Bedő, 2018–

== See also ==
- Hungary women's national ice hockey team
- European Women's Hockey League
- Women's Ice Hockey Bundesliga (DEBL)
