= Austria women's national under-18 ice hockey team =

Austria
- A version of the coat of arms of Austria, with simplified eagle's feathers, is the badge used on the players jerseys.
- Nickname: The Eagles
- Association: Österreichischer Eishockeyverband
- General manager: Martin Kogler
- Head coach: Mario Bellina
- Assistants: Philipp Holper; Tomáš Kala
- Captain: Anna Billa (2024)
- Most games: Julia Kainberger (20); Vanessa Simonis (20)
- Top scorer: Victoria Hummel (10); Anna Meixner (10)
- Most points: Anna Meixner (24)
- IIHF code: AUT

First international
- Austria 2 - 1 Norway (Chambéry, France; 28 December 2008)

Biggest win
- Austria 12 - 0 Romania (Spittal an der Drau, Austria; 7 January 2016)

Biggest defeat
- Switzerland 9 - 0 Austria (Romanshorn, Switzerland; 8 January 2013)

IIHF Ice Hockey U18 Women's World Championship
- Appearances: 14 (first in 2009)
- Best result: 10th (2012)

International record (W–L–T)
- 31–35–0

The Austrian women's national under 18 ice hockey team is the national under-18 ice hockey team in Austria. The team represents Austria at the International Ice Hockey Federation's Ice Hockey U18 Women's World Championship.

== Women's World U18 Championship record ==
Year	GP	W	L	GF	GA	Pts	Rank
2009	4	1	3	8	13	3	12th place (4th in Division I)
2010	5	2	3	16	14	6	12th place (4th in Division I)
2011	5	3	2	19	14	9	11th place (3rd in Division I)
2012	5	4*	1	16	9	11	10th place (2nd in Division I)
2013	5	0	5	7	25	0	14th place (6th in Division I)
2014	4	4	0	21	3	12	15th place (1st in Division I Qualification)
2015	5	0	5	6	19	0	14th place (6th in Division I)
2016	4	4	0	23	3	12	15th place (1st in Division I Qualification)
2017	5	2	3	7	18	6	13th place (5th in Division I Group A)
2018	5	2	3	10	17	6	12th place (4th in Division I Group A)
2019	5	1*	4	3	12	2	14th place (6th in Division I Group A)
2020	5	4*	1	14	3	11	16th place (2nd in Division I Group B)
~~2021~~	Cancelled due to the COVID-19 pandemic						
2022	4	3	1	18	5	10	14th place (1st in Division I Group B)
2023	5	1*	4	6	11	4	13th place (5th in Division I Group A)

*Includes one win in extra time (in the preliminary round)
Source: Elite Prospects

== Team ==
=== Current roster ===
Roster for the 2024 IIHF U18 Women's World Championship Division I Group A.

Head coach: Mario Bellina
Assistant coaches: Philipp Holper, Tomáš Kala

No.	Pos.	Name	Height	Weight	Birthdate	Team
1	G	Karla Kronberger	1.78 m (5 ft 10 in)	69 kg (152 lb)	16 July 2006 (age 20)	(Austria) Graz Huskies
2	D	Artemis Tekin	1.64 m (5 ft 5 in)	60 kg (130 lb)	3 May 2008 (age 18)	(Austria) Okanagan HC Europe
3	D	Valentina Prosen	1.60 m (5 ft 3 in)	51 kg (112 lb)	14 May 2008 (age 18)	(Austria) VSV Villach U17
4	F	Jennifer Amtmann	1.66 m (5 ft 5 in)	52 kg (115 lb)	22 January 2006 (age 20)	(Austria) Okanagan HC Europe
5	F	Elisa Brunner	1.62 m (5 ft 4 in)	57 kg (126 lb)	7 March 2007 (age 19)	(Austria) Salzburg Eagles
6	F	Emma Lintner	1.78 m (5 ft 10 in)	56 kg (123 lb)	15 December 2008 (age 17)	(Switzerland) Lausanne HC
8	F	Zoey Hobitsch – A	1.71 m (5 ft 7 in)	60 kg (130 lb)	3 August 2006 (age 20)	(Austria) VSV Villach U17
10	D	Laura Nagy	1.74 m (5 ft 9 in)	74 kg (163 lb)	2 October 2006 (age 20)	(United States) Newark Ironbound
11	F	Emily Wiesinger	1.72 m (5 ft 8 in)	53 kg (117 lb)	19 September 2006 (age 20)	(Austria) IceCats Linz
12	F	Amelie Suppan	1.65 m (5 ft 5 in)	57 kg (126 lb)	8 January 2009 (age 17)	(Austria) EAC Junior Capitals
13	F	Vanessa Picka	1.65 m (5 ft 5 in)	60 kg (130 lb)	3 July 2008 (age 18)	(Austria) Neuberg Highlanders
14	F	Britta Bachler	1.61 m (5 ft 3 in)	57 kg (126 lb)	15 July 2008 (age 18)	(Austria) KAC Klagenfurt
15	F	Hanna Danninger	1.60 m (5 ft 3 in)	51 kg (112 lb)	9 February 2006 (age 20)	(Austria) Salzburg Eagles
18	F	Emma Kohler	1.62 m (5 ft 4 in)	55 kg (121 lb)	11 October 2006 (age 20)	(Switzerland) SC Rheintal U17
19	F	Isabel Frieß	1.60 m (5 ft 3 in)	50 kg (110 lb)	3 October 2006 (age 20)	(Austria) Neuberg Highlanders
21	D	Anna Billa – C	1.65 m (5 ft 5 in)	65 kg (143 lb)	21 June 2006 (age 20)	(Austria) Sabres Vienna
22	D	Hannah Leitner – A	1.61 m (5 ft 3 in)	57 kg (126 lb)	11 May 2006 (age 20)	(Austria) Innsbruck Haie U17
23	F	Serena Unger	1.71 m (5 ft 7 in)	57 kg (126 lb)	18 December 2007 (age 18)	(Austria) Neuberg Highlanders
24	D	Gloria Henek	1.77 m (5 ft 10 in)	71 kg (157 lb)	5 November 2007 (age 19)	(Switzerland) EHC Winterthur U17
25	G	Rosina Fichtinger	1.67 m (5 ft 6 in)	55 kg (121 lb)	17 November 2006 (age 19)	(Austria) Sabres Vienna

== See also ==
- Austrian Women's Ice Hockey Bundesliga
- Austria women's national ice hockey team
- European Women's Hockey League
