= China women's national under-18 ice hockey team =

Chinese ice hockey team

China
- Association: Chinese Ice Hockey Association
- Head coach: (United States) Digit Murphy
- Assistants: (United States) Kristi Kehoe (China) Qi Xueting
- Captain: Pi Yunlin
- Most games: Several players (14)
- Top scorer: Zhu Rui (7)
- Most points: Zhu Rui (13)
- Team colors
- IIHF code: CHN

First international
- Hungary 10 – 1 China (Asiago, Italy; 29 November 2011)

Biggest win
- China 18 – 0 Netherlands (Heerenveen, Netherlands; 15 January 2024)

Biggest defeat
- Denmark 10 – 0 China (Katowice, Poland; 7 January 2018)

IIHF World Women's U18 Championships - Division I B
- Appearances: 9 (first in 2012)
- Best result: 3rd (first in 2012)

International record (W–L–T)
- 22–26–0

The Chinese women's national under 18 ice hockey team is the national under-18 ice hockey team in China. The team represents China at the International Ice Hockey Federation's IIHF World Women's U18 Division I – Qualifications.

== World Women's U18 Championship record ==
Year	GP	W	L	GF	GA	Pts	Rank
2012	5	3^	2	15	19	8	15th place
2013	5	1	4*	13	20	4	17th place
2014	4	2^	2	11	15	5	17th place
2015	5	1	4*	3	19	4	19th place
2016	4	2	2	17	14	6	19th place
2017	5	1	4**	7	9	5	19th place
2018	5	2^	3	9	22	5	18th place
2019	5	1	4	6	16	3	19th place
2020	5	4^^	1	12	10	10	17th place
2024	5	5	0	48	3	15	21st place (Promoted to Division IB)
2025	5	2	3*	15	11	7	18th place
2026	5	5^	0	30	6	14	15th place (Promoted to Division IA)

^Includes one win in extra time
^^Includes two wins in extra time
*Includes one loss in extra time
**Includes two losses in extra time
