= 2021 IIHF Women's World Championship rosters =

Each team's roster comprised a minimum of fifteen skaters (forwards and defencemen) and two goaltenders, and "due to the special situation with the COVID-19 pandemic and safety rules including no players being allowed to join late, the roster size for the tournament was exceptionally increased [from the standard 23] to 25 players." All ten participating nations, through the confirmation of their respective national associations, were required to submit a "Long List" roster no later than two weeks before the start of the tournament. Final rosters were submitted on 20 August 2021, one day before the tournament begins, but as no players can be added after arriving in Canada, rosters were effectively set when teams landed in Calgary on 11 August 2021.

== Group A ==
=== Canada ===
Roster published 5 August 2021.

Head Coach: Troy Ryan

No.	Pos.	Name	Height	Weight	Birthdate	Team
3	D	Jocelyne Larocque	1.68 m (5 ft 6 in)	66 kg (146 lb)	19 May 1988 (aged 33)	(Canada) PWHPA Toronto
6	F	Rebecca Johnston	1.75 m (5 ft 9 in)	67 kg (148 lb)	24 September 1989 (aged 31)	(Canada) PWHPA Calgary
7	F	Laura Stacey	1.78 m (5 ft 10 in)	71 kg (157 lb)	5 May 1994 (aged 27)	(Canada) PWHPA Montreal
10	F	Sarah Fillier	1.63 m (5 ft 4 in)	59 kg (130 lb)	9 June 2000 (aged 21)	(United States) Princeton Tigers
11	F	Jillian Saulnier	1.65 m (5 ft 5 in)	66 kg (146 lb)	7 March 1992 (aged 29)	(Canada) PWHPA Montreal
14	D	Renata Fast	1.70 m (5 ft 7 in)	65 kg (143 lb)	6 October 1994 (aged 26)	(Canada) PWHPA Toronto
15	F	Mélodie Daoust	1.63 m (5 ft 4 in)	71 kg (157 lb)	7 January 1992 (aged 29)	(Canada) PWHPA Montreal
17	D	Ella Shelton	1.73 m (5 ft 8 in)	68 kg (150 lb)	19 January 1998 (aged 23)	(Canada) PWHPA Toronto
19	F	Brianne Jenner – A	1.75 m (5 ft 9 in)	71 kg (157 lb)	4 May 1991 (aged 30)	(Canada) PWHPA Toronto
20	F	Sarah Nurse	1.75 m (5 ft 9 in)	67 kg (148 lb)	4 January 1995 (aged 26)	(Canada) PWHPA Toronto
21	D	Ashton Bell	1.73 m (5 ft 8 in)	64 kg (141 lb)	7 December 1999 (aged 21)	(United States) Minnesota Duluth Bulldogs
23	D	Erin Ambrose	1.65 m (5 ft 5 in)	60 kg (130 lb)	30 April 1994 (aged 27)	(Canada) PWHPA Toronto
24	F	Natalie Spooner	1.78 m (5 ft 10 in)	82 kg (181 lb)	17 October 1990 (aged 30)	(Canada) PWHPA Toronto
25	D	Jaime Bourbonnais	1.70 m (5 ft 7 in)	57 kg (126 lb)	9 September 1998 (aged 22)	(Canada) PWHPA Montreal
26	F	Emily Clark	1.70 m (5 ft 7 in)	61 kg (134 lb)	28 November 1995 (aged 25)	(Canada) PWHPA Montreal
27	F	Emma Maltais	1.63 m (5 ft 4 in)	66 kg (146 lb)	4 November 1999 (aged 21)	(United States) Ohio State Buckeyes
29	F	Marie-Philip Poulin – C	1.70 m (5 ft 7 in)	73 kg (161 lb)	28 March 1991 (aged 30)	(Canada) PWHPA Montreal
35	G	Ann-Renée Desbiens	1.75 m (5 ft 9 in)	73 kg (161 lb)	10 April 1994 (aged 27)	(Canada) PWHPA Montreal
38	G	Emerance Maschmeyer	1.68 m (5 ft 6 in)	64 kg (141 lb)	5 October 1994 (aged 26)	(Canada) PWHPA Montreal
40	F	Blayre Turnbull – A	1.70 m (5 ft 7 in)	69 kg (152 lb)	15 July 1993 (aged 28)	(Canada) PWHPA Calgary
42	D	Claire Thompson	1.72 m (5 ft 8 in)	60 kg (130 lb)	28 January 1998 (aged 23)	(Canada) PWHPA Toronto
43	F	Kristin O'Neill	1.63 m (5 ft 4 in)	57 kg (126 lb)	30 March 1998 (aged 23)	(Canada) PWHPA Toronto
47	F	Jamie Lee Rattray	1.68 m (5 ft 6 in)	78 kg (172 lb)	30 September 1992 (aged 28)	(Canada) PWHPA Toronto
50	G	Kristen Campbell	1.78 m (5 ft 10 in)	80 kg (180 lb)	30 November 1997 (aged 23)	(Canada) PWHPA Calgary
51	F	Victoria Bach	1.62 m (5 ft 4 in)	56 kg (123 lb)	12 July 1996 (aged 25)	(Canada) PWHPA Toronto

=== Finland ===
Roster published 3 August 2021.

Head coach: Pasi Mustonen

No.	Pos.	Name	Height	Weight	Birthdate	Team
1	G	Anni Keisala	1.75 m (5 ft 9 in)	80 kg (180 lb)	5 April 1997 (aged 24)	(Finland) Ilves
4	D	Rosa Lindstedt	1.87 m (6 ft 2 in)	81 kg (179 lb)	24 January 1988 (aged 33)	(Sweden) Brynäs IF
5	D	Aino Karppinen	1.68 m (5 ft 6 in)	69 kg (152 lb)	7 August 1998 (aged 23)	(Finland) RoKi
6	D	Jenni Hiirikoski – C	1.62 m (5 ft 4 in)	62 kg (137 lb)	30 March 1987 (aged 34)	(Sweden) Luleå HF
8	D	Ella Viitasuo	1.72 m (5 ft 8 in)	69 kg (152 lb)	27 May 1996 (aged 25)	(Finland) Kiekko-Espoo
9	D	Nelli Laitinen	1.69 m (5 ft 7 in)	62 kg (137 lb)	29 April 2002 (aged 19)	(Finland) Kiekko-Espoo
10	F	Elisa Holopainen	1.66 m (5 ft 5 in)	58 kg (128 lb)	27 December 2001 (aged 19)	(Finland) Kiekko-Espoo
12	F	Sanni Vanhanen	1.65 m (5 ft 5 in)	57 kg (126 lb)	1 July 2005 (aged 16)	(Finland) Tappara
15	D	Minttu Tuominen	1.65 m (5 ft 5 in)	71 kg (157 lb)	26 June 1990 (aged 31)	(Finland) Kiekko-Espoo
16	F	Petra Nieminen – A	1.69 m (5 ft 7 in)	68 kg (150 lb)	4 May 1999 (aged 22)	(Sweden) Luleå HF
18	G	Meeri Räisänen	1.70 m (5 ft 7 in)	66 kg (146 lb)	2 December 1989 (aged 31)	(Finland) JYP-Akatemia
20	F	Matilda Nilsson	1.64 m (5 ft 5 in)	61 kg (134 lb)	2 March 1997 (aged 24)	(Finland) HIFK
21	D	Sini Karjalainen	1.74 m (5 ft 9 in)	68 kg (150 lb)	30 January 1999 (aged 22)	(United States) Vermont Catamounts
22	F	Emilia Vesa	1.77 m (5 ft 10 in)	66 kg (146 lb)	3 January 2001 (aged 20)	(Finland) Kiekko-Espoo
23	F	Sanni Hakala	1.54 m (5 ft 1 in)	54 kg (119 lb)	31 October 1997 (aged 23)	(Sweden) HV71
24	F	Viivi Vainikka	1.66 m (5 ft 5 in)	67 kg (148 lb)	23 December 2001 (aged 19)	(Sweden) Luleå HF
25	F	Jenniina Nylund	1.71 m (5 ft 7 in)	64 kg (141 lb)	18 June 1999 (aged 22)	(United States) St. Cloud State Huskies
26	F	Sofianna Sundelin	1.69 m (5 ft 7 in)	55 kg (121 lb)	13 January 2003 (aged 18)	(Finland) Team Kuortane
27	F	Julia Liikala	1.66 m (5 ft 5 in)	63 kg (139 lb)	20 March 2001 (aged 20)	(Finland) HIFK
31	G	Jenna Silvonen	1.65 m (5 ft 5 in)	61 kg (134 lb)	2 January 1999 (aged 22)	(United States) Mercyhurst Lakers
33	F	Michelle Karvinen – A	1.67 m (5 ft 6 in)	65 kg (143 lb)	27 March 1990 (aged 31)	(Switzerland) HC Ladies Lugano
40	F	Noora Tulus	1.65 m (5 ft 5 in)	56 kg (123 lb)	15 August 1995 (aged 26)	(Sweden) Luleå HF
61	F	Tanja Niskanen	1.76 m (5 ft 9 in)	72 kg (159 lb)	11 September 1992 (aged 28)	(Finland) KalPa
77	F	Susanna Tapani	1.77 m (5 ft 10 in)	68 kg (150 lb)	2 March 1993 (aged 28)	(Finland) HC TPS
88	D	Ronja Savolainen	1.77 m (5 ft 10 in)	75 kg (165 lb)	29 November 1997 (aged 23)	(Sweden) Luleå HF

=== Russian Olympic Committee (ROC) ===
Roster published 10 August 2021.

Head coach: Yevgeni Bobariko

No.	Pos.	Name	Height	Weight	Birthdate	Team
2	D	Angelina Goncharenko	1.77 m (5 ft 10 in)	70 kg (150 lb)	23 May 1994 (aged 27)	(Russia) SKIF Nizhny Novgorod
7	F	Kristi Shashkina	1.78 m (5 ft 10 in)	80 kg (180 lb)	9 January 2003 (aged 18)	(Russia) Dynamo-Neva St. Petersburg
11	D	Liana Ganeeva	1.65 m (5 ft 5 in)	62 kg (137 lb)	20 December 1997 (aged 23)	(Russia) Dynamo-Neva St. Petersburg
13	D	Nina Pirogova – A	1.73 m (5 ft 8 in)	68 kg (150 lb)	26 January 1999 (aged 22)	(Russia) Tornado Moscow
15	F	Valeria Pavlova	1.78 m (5 ft 10 in)	80 kg (180 lb)	15 April 1995 (aged 26)	(Russia) Biryusa Krasnoyarsk
16	F	Ilona Markova	1.66 m (5 ft 5 in)	59 kg (130 lb)	18 January 2002 (aged 19)	(Russia) Agidel Ufa
17	F	Fanuza Kadirova	1.63 m (5 ft 4 in)	62 kg (137 lb)	6 April 1998 (aged 23)	(Russia) Dynamo-Neva St. Petersburg
18	F	Olga Sosina – C	1.63 m (5 ft 4 in)	77 kg (170 lb)	27 July 1992 (aged 29)	(Russia) Agidel Ufa
19	D	Elena Provorova	1.65 m (5 ft 5 in)	58 kg (128 lb)	22 November 2001 (aged 19)	(Russia) SKIF Nizhny Novgorod
22	D	Maria Batalova	1.73 m (5 ft 8 in)	69 kg (152 lb)	3 May 1996 (aged 25)	(Russia) Agidel Ufa
26	F	Yekaterina Dobrodeyeva	1.59 m (5 ft 3 in)	62 kg (137 lb)	10 December 1999 (aged 21)	(Russia) Biryusa Krasnoyarsk
27	F	Veronika Korzhakova	1.68 m (5 ft 6 in)	62 kg (137 lb)	9 June 2003 (aged 18)	(Russia) Agidel Ufa
29	F	Alexandra Vafina	1.64 m (5 ft 5 in)	57 kg (126 lb)	28 July 1990 (aged 31)	(Russia) Dynamo-Neva St. Petersburg
30	G	Valeria Merkusheva	1.68 m (5 ft 6 in)	66 kg (146 lb)	30 September 1999 (aged 21)	(Russia) SKIF Nizhny Novgorod
31	G	Anna Prugova	1.73 m (5 ft 8 in)	65 kg (143 lb)	3 January 1986 (aged 35)	(Russia) Agidel Ufa
42	F	Oksana Bratishcheva	1.65 m (5 ft 5 in)	54 kg (119 lb)	5 June 2000 (aged 21)	(Russia) SKIF Nizhny Novgorod
43	F	Yekaterina Likhachyova	1.71 m (5 ft 7 in)	66 kg (146 lb)	24 August 1998 (aged 22)	(Russia) SKIF Nizhny Novgorod
59	F	Sofiya Lifatova	1.67 m (5 ft 6 in)	64 kg (141 lb)	27 March 2003 (aged 18)	(Russia) Biryusa Krasnoyarsk
70	D	Anna Shibanova – A	1.62 m (5 ft 4 in)	63 kg (139 lb)	10 November 1994 (aged 26)	(Russia) Agidel Ufa
72	D	Anna Savonina	1.65 m (5 ft 5 in)	65 kg (143 lb)	5 December 2001 (aged 19)	(Russia) Tornado Moscow
73	F	Viktoria Kulishova	1.71 m (5 ft 7 in)	62 kg (137 lb)	12 August 1999 (aged 22)	(Russia) SKIF Nizhny Novgorod
79	F	Landysh Falyakhova	1.59 m (5 ft 3 in)	52 kg (115 lb)	31 August 1998 (aged 22)	(Russia) SKIF Nizhny Novgorod
92	G	Nadezhda Morozova	1.70 m (5 ft 7 in)	88 kg (194 lb)	29 November 1996 (aged 24)	(Russia) Dynamo-Neva St. Petersburg
93	F	Elizaveta Rodnova	1.65 m (5 ft 5 in)	62 kg (137 lb)	12 July 1999 (aged 22)	(Russia) Agidel Ufa

=== Switzerland ===
Roster published 9 August 2021.

Head coach: Colin Muller

No.	Pos.	Name	Height	Weight	Birthdate	Team
3	D	Sarah Forster	1.68 m (5 ft 6 in)	66 kg (146 lb)	19 March 1993 (aged 28)	(Sweden) AIK IF
4	D	Nadine Hofstetter	1.64 m (5 ft 5 in)	68 kg (150 lb)	21 October 1994 (aged 26)	(Switzerland) SC Reinach
6	F	Mara Frey	1.69 m (5 ft 7 in)	64 kg (141 lb)	26 September 2002 (aged 18)	(Switzerland) SC Reinach
7	F	Lara Stalder – C	1.67 m (5 ft 6 in)	63 kg (139 lb)	15 May 1994 (aged 27)	(Sweden) Brynäs IF
8	F	Kaleigh Quennec – A	1.72 m (5 ft 8 in)	80 kg (180 lb)	15 February 1998 (aged 23)	(Canada) Montreal Carabins
9	D	Shannon Sigrist	1.67 m (5 ft 6 in)	68 kg (150 lb)	20 April 1999 (aged 22)	(Sweden) Linköping HC
10	D	Janine Hauser	1.69 m (5 ft 7 in)	74 kg (163 lb)	6 May 2001 (aged 20)	(Switzerland) ZSC Lions
12	F	Lisa Rüedi	1.67 m (5 ft 6 in)	67 kg (148 lb)	3 November 2000 (aged 20)	(Switzerland) ZSC Lions
14	F	Evelina Raselli – A	1.70 m (5 ft 7 in)	61 kg (134 lb)	3 May 1992 (aged 29)	(Switzerland) HC Ladies Lugano
15	F	Laura Zimmermann	1.63 m (5 ft 4 in)	69 kg (152 lb)	5 April 2003 (aged 18)	(Switzerland) EV Bomo Thun
16	D	Nicole Vallario	1.66 m (5 ft 5 in)	66 kg (146 lb)	30 August 2001 (aged 19)	(United States) St. Thomas Tommies
17	D	Lara Christen	1.63 m (5 ft 4 in)	64 kg (141 lb)	2 October 2002 (aged 18)	(Switzerland) ZSC Lions
18	D	Stefanie Wetli	1.73 m (5 ft 8 in)	67 kg (148 lb)	4 February 2000 (aged 21)	(Switzerland) HT Thurgau Ladies
19	F	Emma Ingold	1.70 m (5 ft 7 in)	60 kg (130 lb)	12 August 2002 (aged 19)	(Switzerland) Neuchâtel Hockey Academy
20	G	Andrea Brändli	1.67 m (5 ft 6 in)	76 kg (168 lb)	5 June 1997 (aged 24)	(United States) Ohio State Buckeyes
21	F	Rahel Enzler	1.63 m (5 ft 4 in)	66 kg (146 lb)	30 July 2000 (aged 21)	(United States) Maine Black Bears
22	D	Sinja Leemann	1.66 m (5 ft 5 in)	60 kg (130 lb)	19 April 2002 (aged 19)	(Switzerland) ZSC Lions
24	F	Noemi Ryhner	1.65 m (5 ft 5 in)	62 kg (137 lb)	24 April 2000 (aged 21)	(Switzerland) HC Ladies Lugano
25	F	Alina Müller	1.67 m (5 ft 6 in)	65 kg (143 lb)	12 March 1998 (aged 23)	(United States) Northeastern Huskies
26	F	Dominique Rüegg	1.73 m (5 ft 8 in)	79 kg (174 lb)	5 February 1996 (aged 25)	(Switzerland) ZSC Lions
28	F	Alina Marti	1.67 m (5 ft 6 in)	66 kg (146 lb)	23 April 2004 (aged 17)	(Switzerland) ZSC Lions
29	G	Saskia Maurer	1.66 m (5 ft 5 in)	59 kg (130 lb)	29 July 2001 (aged 20)	(United States) St. Thomas Tommies
39	G	Caroline Spies	1.68 m (5 ft 6 in)	66 kg (146 lb)	2 July 2002 (aged 19)	(Switzerland) EHC Basel
71	F	Lena Marie Lutz	1.66 m (5 ft 5 in)	68 kg (150 lb)	12 July 2001 (aged 20)	(Switzerland) HT Thurgau Ladies
88	F	Phoebe Staenz	1.61 m (5 ft 3 in)	58 kg (128 lb)	7 January 1994 (aged 27)	(Sweden) Leksands IF

=== United States ===
Roster published on 22 June 2021.

Head coach: Joel Johnson

No.	Pos.	Name	Height	Weight	Birthdate	Team
2	D	Lee Stecklein – A	1.83 m (6 ft 0 in)	77 kg (170 lb)	23 April 1994 (aged 27)	(United States) PWHPA Minnesota
3	D	Cayla Barnes	1.57 m (5 ft 2 in)	63 kg (139 lb)	7 January 1999 (age 27)	(United States) Boston College Eagles
4	D	Caroline Harvey	1.73 m (5 ft 8 in)	73 kg (161 lb)	14 October 2002 (aged 18)	(United States) Wisconsin Badgers
5	D	Megan Keller	1.80 m (5 ft 11 in)	75 kg (165 lb)	1 May 1996 (aged 25)	(United States) PWHPA New Hampshire
9	D	Megan Bozek	1.73 m (5 ft 8 in)	80 kg (180 lb)	27 March 1991 (aged 30)	(China) KRS Vanke Rays
11	F	Abby Roque	1.70 m (5 ft 7 in)	82 kg (181 lb)	25 September 1997 (aged 23)	(United States) PWHPA Minnesota
12	F	Kelly Pannek	1.73 m (5 ft 8 in)	75 kg (165 lb)	29 December 1995 (aged 25)	(United States) PWHPA Minnesota
13	F	Grace Zumwinkle	1.75 m (5 ft 9 in)	75 kg (165 lb)	23 April 1999 (aged 22)	(United States) Minnesota Golden Gophers
14	F	Brianna Decker – A	1.63 m (5 ft 4 in)	67 kg (148 lb)	13 May 1991 (aged 30)	(Canada) PWHPA Calgary
15	D	Savannah Harmon	1.60 m (5 ft 3 in)	67 kg (148 lb)	27 October 1995 (aged 25)	(United States) PWHPA Minnesota
16	F	Hayley Scamurra	1.73 m (5 ft 8 in)	73 kg (161 lb)	14 December 1994 (aged 26)	(United States) PWHPA New Hampshire
18	F	Jesse Compher	1.73 m (5 ft 8 in)	68 kg (150 lb)	1 July 1999 (aged 22)	(United States) Boston University Terriers
19	D	Jincy Roese	1.67 m (5 ft 6 in)	70 kg (150 lb)	15 May 1997 (aged 24)	(United States) PWHPA Minnesota
21	F	Hilary Knight – A	1.80 m (5 ft 11 in)	78 kg (172 lb)	12 July 1989 (aged 32)	(United States) PWHPA Minnesota
23	D	Natalie Buchbinder	1.72 m (5 ft 8 in)	68 kg (150 lb)	22 January 1999 (aged 22)	(United States) Wisconsin Badgers
24	F	Dani Cameranesi	1.65 m (5 ft 5 in)	70 kg (150 lb)	30 June 1995 (aged 26)	(United States) PWHPA Minnesota
25	F	Alex Carpenter	1.70 m (5 ft 7 in)	70 kg (150 lb)	13 April 1994 (aged 27)	(China) KRS Vanke Rays
26	F	Kendall Coyne Schofield – C	1.57 m (5 ft 2 in)	57 kg (126 lb)	25 May 1992 (aged 29)	(United States) PWHPA Minnesota
27	F	Britta Curl	1.75 m (5 ft 9 in)	72 kg (159 lb)	20 March 2000 (aged 21)	(United States) Wisconsin Badgers
28	F	Amanda Kessel	1.68 m (5 ft 6 in)	59 kg (130 lb)	28 August 1991 (aged 29)	(United States) PWHPA New Hampshire
29	G	Nicole Hensley	1.67 m (5 ft 6 in)	70 kg (150 lb)	23 June 1994 (aged 27)	(United States) PWHPA Minnesota
31	G	Aerin Frankel	1.65 m (5 ft 5 in)	63 kg (139 lb)	24 May 1999 (aged 22)	(United States) Northeastern Huskies
33	G	Alex Cavallini	1.70 m (5 ft 7 in)	70 kg (150 lb)	3 January 1992 (aged 29)	(United States) PWHPA Minnesota
36	F	Lacey Eden	1.73 m (5 ft 8 in)	68 kg (150 lb)	2 May 2002 (aged 19)	(United States) Wisconsin Badgers
37	F	Abbey Murphy	1.65 m (5 ft 5 in)	66 kg (146 lb)	14 April 2002 (aged 19)	(United States) Minnesota Golden Gophers

== Group B ==
=== Czech Republic ===
Roster published 9 August 2021.

Head coach: Tomáš Pacina

No.	Pos.	Name	Height	Weight	Birthdate	Team
1	G	Viktorie Švejdová	1.68 m (5 ft 6 in)	65 kg (143 lb)	24 June 2002 (aged 19)	(Sweden) Modo Hockey
2	D	Aneta Tejralová	1.64 m (5 ft 5 in)	53 kg (117 lb)	4 January 1996 (aged 25)	(Russia) SKIF Nizhny Novgorod
3	D	Magdalena Erbenová	1.67 m (5 ft 6 in)	72 kg (159 lb)	9 February 2000 (aged 21)	(United States) RPI Engineers
4	D	Daniela Pejšová	1.73 m (5 ft 8 in)	73 kg (161 lb)	14 August 2002 (aged 19)	(Sweden) Modo Hockey
5	D	Samantha Ahn Kolowratová – A	1.70 m (5 ft 7 in)	71 kg (157 lb)	12 July 1996 (aged 25)	(Sweden) Brynäs IF
7	F	Lenka Serdar	1.72 m (5 ft 8 in)	63 kg (139 lb)	21 July 1997 (aged 24)	(Sweden) Linköping HC
8	D	Klára Seroiszková	1.75 m (5 ft 9 in)	72 kg (159 lb)	25 January 2001 (aged 20)	(Sweden) Göteborg HC
9	F	Alena Mills – C	1.73 m (5 ft 8 in)	80 kg (180 lb)	9 June 1990 (aged 31)	(China) KRS Vanke Rays
10	F	Denisa Křížová	1.65 m (5 ft 5 in)	68 kg (150 lb)	3 November 1994 (aged 26)	(Sweden) Brynäs IF
12	F	Klára Hymlarová	1.62 m (5 ft 4 in)	67 kg (148 lb)	27 February 1999 (aged 22)	(United States) St. Cloud State Huskies
13	F	Tereza Mazancová	1.62 m (5 ft 4 in)	64 kg (141 lb)	15 September 2002 (aged 18)	(Czech Republic) HC Benátky nad Jizerou
14	D	Dominika Lásková	1.64 m (5 ft 5 in)	71 kg (157 lb)	20 December 1996 (aged 24)	(United States) Merrimack Warriors
16	F	Kateřina Mrázová – A	1.63 m (5 ft 4 in)	64 kg (141 lb)	19 October 1992 (aged 28)	(Sweden) Brynäs IF
17	D	Pavlína Horálková	1.66 m (5 ft 5 in)	61 kg (134 lb)	24 May 1991 (aged 30)	(Russia) Biryusa Krasnoyarsk
18	F	Michaela Pejzlová	1.70 m (5 ft 7 in)	66 kg (146 lb)	4 June 1997 (aged 24)	(Finland) HIFK
19	F	Natálie Mlýnková	1.61 m (5 ft 3 in)	63 kg (139 lb)	24 May 2001 (aged 20)	(United States) Vermont Catamounts
21	F	Tereza Vanišová	1.70 m (5 ft 7 in)	64 kg (141 lb)	30 January 1996 (aged 25)	(Sweden) Leksands IF
23	F	Kateřina Bukolská	1.70 m (5 ft 7 in)	70 kg (150 lb)	6 March 1997 (aged 24)	(Sweden) Leksands IF
24	D	Sára Čajanová	1.68 m (5 ft 6 in)	63 kg (139 lb)	10 December 2002 (aged 18)	(Czech Republic) VHK Vsetín
25	F	Kristýna Pátková	1.67 m (5 ft 6 in)	69 kg (152 lb)	17 June 1998 (aged 23)	(United States) Vermont Catamounts
26	F	Vendula Přibylová	1.71 m (5 ft 7 in)	78 kg (172 lb)	23 March 1996 (aged 25)	(Sweden) AIK IF
27	D	Tereza Radová	1.72 m (5 ft 8 in)	73 kg (161 lb)	22 November 2001 (aged 19)	(Sweden) Göteborg HC
28	F	Noemi Neubauerová	1.73 m (5 ft 8 in)	69 kg (152 lb)	15 December 1999 (aged 21)	(United States) Colgate Raiders
29	G	Klára Peslarová	1.64 m (5 ft 5 in)	63 kg (139 lb)	23 November 1996 (aged 24)	(Sweden) Modo Hockey
30	G	Kateřina Zechovská	1.65 m (5 ft 5 in)	78 kg (172 lb)	4 November 1998 (aged 22)	(Czech Republic) HC Draci Bílina

=== Denmark ===
Roster published 9 August 2021.

Head coach: Peter Elander

No.	Pos.	Name	Height	Weight	Birthdate	Team
2	D	Kristine Melberg	1.69 m (5 ft 7 in)	69 kg (152 lb)	28 December 2000 (aged 20)	(Sweden) IF Malmö
4	F	Silke Glud	1.75 m (5 ft 9 in)	65 kg (143 lb)	3 March 1996 (aged 25)	(Denmark) Rødovre SIK
8	F	Josefine Persson	1.76 m (5 ft 9 in)	69 kg (152 lb)	28 March 1994 (aged 27)	(Sweden) Luleå HF
11	D	Amalie Andersen	1.73 m (5 ft 8 in)	73 kg (161 lb)	6 October 1999 (aged 21)	(United States) Maine Black Bears
12	F	Mille Sørensen	1.55 m (5 ft 1 in)	60 kg (130 lb)	17 December 2001 (aged 19)	(Denmark) Hvidovre IK
13	F	Michele Brix	1.69 m (5 ft 7 in)	75 kg (165 lb)	10 July 1996 (aged 25)	(Denmark) Odense IK
14	F	Nicoline Jensen – A	1.65 m (5 ft 5 in)	65 kg (143 lb)	8 November 1992 (aged 28)	(Sweden) HV71
15	D	Amanda Refsgaard	1.75 m (5 ft 9 in)	63 kg (139 lb)	8 March 2001 (aged 20)	(Denmark) Rødovre SIK
17	F	Sofia Skriver	1.65 m (5 ft 5 in)	60 kg (130 lb)	7 June 2003 (aged 18)	(Sweden) Luleå HF
18	F	Maria Peters	1.68 m (5 ft 6 in)	60 kg (130 lb)	16 September 1999 (aged 21)	(Denmark) Odense IK
19	D	Josephine Asperup	1.63 m (5 ft 4 in)	64 kg (141 lb)	21 July 1992 (aged 29)	(Sweden) IF Malmö
21	F	Michelle Weis	1.69 m (5 ft 7 in)	59 kg (130 lb)	10 April 1997 (aged 24)	(United States) Maine Black Bears
22	D	Sofie Skott	1.72 m (5 ft 8 in)	62 kg (137 lb)	14 June 2002 (aged 19)	(Denmark) Hvidovre IK
23	F	Julie Oksbjerg	1.78 m (5 ft 10 in)	67 kg (148 lb)	2 December 2000 (aged 20)	(Denmark) Odense IK
27	F	Lilli Friis-Hansen	1.63 m (5 ft 4 in)	55 kg (121 lb)	27 January 2000 (aged 21)	(United States) RPI Engineers
30	G	Lisa Jensen	1.65 m (5 ft 5 in)	61 kg (134 lb)	26 February 1997 (aged 24)	(Sweden) IF Malmö
33	G	Emma-Sofie Nordström	1.77 m (5 ft 10 in)	75 kg (165 lb)	5 November 2002 (aged 18)	(Sweden) Linköping HC
44	F	Julie Østergaard	1.70 m (5 ft 7 in)	65 kg (143 lb)	6 August 1995 (aged 26)	(Denmark) Hvidovre IK
50	F	Mia Bau Hansen	1.67 m (5 ft 6 in)	65 kg (143 lb)	22 June 1995 (aged 26)	(Sweden) IF Malmö
63	F	Josefine Jakobsen – C	1.70 m (5 ft 7 in)	72 kg (159 lb)	17 May 1991 (aged 30)	(Sweden) Djurgårdens IF
68	F	Emma Russell	1.68 m (5 ft 6 in)	75 kg (165 lb)	18 August 1995 (aged 26)	(Denmark) Rødovre SIK
72	G	Cassandra Repstock-Romme	1.71 m (5 ft 7 in)	72 kg (159 lb)	26 August 2001 (aged 19)	(Denmark) Hvidovre IK
77	D	Linn Ploug	1.76 m (5 ft 9 in)	72 kg (159 lb)	13 July 1999 (aged 22)	(United States) LIU Sharks
87	D	Simone Jacquet Thrysøe	1.80 m (5 ft 11 in)	72 kg (159 lb)	23 April 1987 (aged 34)	(Denmark) Aalborg IK
89	D	Malene Frandsen – A	1.78 m (5 ft 10 in)	68 kg (150 lb)	25 October 1995 (aged 25)	(Sweden) IF Malmö

=== Germany ===
Roster published 10 August 2021.

Head Coach: Thomas Schädler

No.	Pos.	Name	Height	Weight	Birthdate	Team
6	F	Theresa Wagner	1.64 m (5 ft 5 in)	56 kg (123 lb)	5 May 1995 (aged 26)	(Germany) ESC Planegg
7	F	Svenja Voigt	1.65 m (5 ft 5 in)	56 kg (123 lb)	29 March 2004 (aged 17)	(Canada) Stanstead College
8	F	Julia Zorn – C	1.70 m (5 ft 7 in)	69 kg (152 lb)	6 February 1990 (aged 31)	(Germany) ESC Planegg
9	D	Rebecca Orendorz	1.66 m (5 ft 5 in)	66 kg (146 lb)	28 April 1993 (aged 28)	(Germany) ESC Planegg
10	D	Yvonne Rothemund	1.80 m (5 ft 11 in)	79 kg (174 lb)	23 September 1992 (aged 28)	(Germany) ESC Planegg
11	F	Nicola Eisenschmid	1.66 m (5 ft 5 in)	65 kg (143 lb)	10 September 1996 (aged 24)	(Germany) ERC Ingolstadt
12	D	Anna Reich	1.74 m (5 ft 9 in)	73 kg (161 lb)	3 April 1994 (aged 27)	(Germany) ESC Planegg
14	D	Carina Strobel	1.72 m (5 ft 8 in)	60 kg (130 lb)	11 September 1997 (aged 23)	(Germany) ECDC Memmingen
16	F	Katharina Häckelsmiller	1.63 m (5 ft 4 in)	56 kg (123 lb)	27 August 2004 (aged 16)	(Germany) HC Landsberg
17	D	Lena Düsterhöft	1.77 m (5 ft 10 in)	70 kg (150 lb)	26 August 1996 (aged 24)	(Germany) ERC Ingolstadt
18	F	Bernadette Karpf	1.67 m (5 ft 6 in)	61 kg (134 lb)	3 July 1996 (aged 25)	(Germany) ERC Ingolstadt
19	F	Kerstin Spielberger	1.68 m (5 ft 6 in)	61 kg (134 lb)	14 December 1995 (aged 25)	(Germany) ESC Planegg
21	D	Tabea Botthof	1.75 m (5 ft 9 in)	73 kg (161 lb)	1 June 2000 (aged 21)	(United States) Yale Bulldogs
22	F	Marie Delarbre	1.74 m (5 ft 9 in)	70 kg (150 lb)	22 January 1994 (aged 27)	(Germany) ERC Ingolstadt
23	D	Tanja Eisenschmid – A	1.72 m (5 ft 8 in)	69 kg (152 lb)	20 April 1993 (aged 28)	(Germany) ERC Ingolstadt
24	F	Sonja Weidenfelder	1.65 m (5 ft 5 in)	63 kg (139 lb)	7 March 1993 (aged 28)	(Germany) ECDC Memmingen
25	F	Laura Kluge – A	1.78 m (5 ft 10 in)	55 kg (121 lb)	6 November 1996 (aged 24)	(Germany) ECDC Memmingen
28	D	Nina Jobst-Smith	1.65 m (5 ft 5 in)	63 kg (139 lb)	30 August 2001 (aged 19)	(United States) Minnesota Duluth Bulldogs
29	F	Nina Christof	1.62 m (5 ft 4 in)	64 kg (141 lb)	18 August 2002 (aged 19)	(United States) Bishop Kearney Selects
30	G	Jennifer Harß	1.75 m (5 ft 9 in)	62 kg (137 lb)	14 July 1987 (aged 34)	(Germany) ECDC Memmingen
31	F	Jule Schiefer	1.75 m (5 ft 9 in)	59 kg (130 lb)	12 September 2001 (aged 19)	(Germany) ERC Ingolstadt
35	G	Sandra Abstreiter	1.81 m (5 ft 11 in)	67 kg (148 lb)	23 July 1998 (aged 23)	(United States) Providence Friars
95	G	Franziska Albl	1.67 m (5 ft 6 in)	67 kg (148 lb)	29 April 1995 (aged 26)	(Germany) EC Pfaffenhofen

=== Hungary ===
Roster published 11 August 2021.

Head coach: Lisa Haley

No.	Pos.	Name	Height	Weight	Birthdate	Team
1	G	Anikó Németh	1.65 m (5 ft 5 in)	62 kg (137 lb)	6 September 1996 (aged 24)	(Hungary) MAC Budapest
2	D	Bernadett Németh	1.65 m (5 ft 5 in)	59 kg (130 lb)	6 September 1996 (aged 24)	(Hungary) MAC Budapest
8	F	Petra Szamosfalvi	1.62 m (5 ft 4 in)	62 kg (137 lb)	10 May 2002 (aged 19)	(Hungary) KMH Budapest
10	F	Imola Horváth	1.67 m (5 ft 6 in)	72 kg (159 lb)	2 August 2002 (aged 19)	(Hungary) MAC Budapest
11	F	Fanni Gasparics – C	1.67 m (5 ft 6 in)	58 kg (128 lb)	20 November 1994 (aged 26)	(Hungary) MAC Budapest
12	F	Andrea Kiss	1.62 m (5 ft 4 in)	54 kg (119 lb)	4 December 1996 (aged 24)	(Hungary) MAC Budapest
13	D	Lotti Odnoga	1.74 m (5 ft 9 in)	71 kg (157 lb)	19 January 1999 (aged 22)	(United States) Dartmouth Big Green
14	D	Franciska Kiss-Simon – A	1.80 m (5 ft 11 in)	79 kg (174 lb)	7 November 1995 (aged 25)	(Hungary) KMH Budapest
15	F	Réka Dabasi – A	1.68 m (5 ft 6 in)	60 kg (130 lb)	24 December 1996 (aged 24)	(Hungary) KMH Budapest
16	D	Jelena Grkovic	1.60 m (5 ft 3 in)	69 kg (152 lb)	30 August 1997 (aged 23)	(Hungary) MAC Budapest
17	D	Enikő Tóth	1.62 m (5 ft 4 in)	61 kg (134 lb)	17 March 1996 (aged 25)	(Hungary) KMH Budapest
20	G	Zsófia Tóth	1.67 m (5 ft 6 in)	74 kg (163 lb)	1 August 2003 (aged 18)	(Hungary) KMH Budapest
21	D	Réka Pártos	1.60 m (5 ft 3 in)	64 kg (141 lb)	26 January 1996 (aged 25)	(Hungary) MAC Budapest
22	F	Alexandra Rónai	1.60 m (5 ft 3 in)	61 kg (134 lb)	8 December 1993 (aged 27)	(Hungary) MAC Budapest
25	G	Fruzsina Szabó	1.75 m (5 ft 9 in)	75 kg (165 lb)	2 February 2004 (aged 17)	(Hungary) MAC Budapest
71	D	Fruzsina Mayer	1.68 m (5 ft 6 in)	82 kg (181 lb)	16 July 2000 (aged 21)	(Canada) HTI Stars
77	F	Regina Metzler	1.75 m (5 ft 9 in)	68 kg (150 lb)	25 October 2005 (aged 15)	(Hungary) KMH Budapest
79	F	Lili Pintér	1.75 m (5 ft 9 in)	70 kg (150 lb)	7 November 1996 (aged 24)	(Sweden) SDE HF
82	F	Míra Seregély	1.76 m (5 ft 9 in)	64 kg (141 lb)	27 April 2003 (aged 18)	(Hungary) Maine Black Bears
88	F	Emma Kreisz	1.75 m (5 ft 9 in)	69 kg (152 lb)	2 September 2003 (aged 17)	(Canada) Stanstead College
89	F	Hanna Pintér	1.74 m (5 ft 9 in)	69 kg (152 lb)	30 March 1998 (aged 23)	(Sweden) SDE HF
93	F	Alexandra Gowie	1.75 m (5 ft 9 in)	75 kg (165 lb)	2 February 1993 (aged 28)	(Hungary) MAC Budapest
96	D	Sarah Knee	1.85 m (6 ft 1 in)	87 kg (192 lb)	29 March 1996 (aged 25)	(Hungary) KMH Budapest
97	F	Kinga Jókai-Szilágyi	1.70 m (5 ft 7 in)	66 kg (146 lb)	19 August 1997 (aged 24)	(Austria) Vienna Sabres

=== Japan ===
Roster published August 2021.

Head Coach: Yuji Iizuka

No.	Pos.	Name	Height	Weight	Birthdate	Team
1	G	Nana Fujimoto	1.63 m (5 ft 4 in)	55 kg (121 lb)	3 March 1989 (aged 32)	(Sweden) Färjestad BK
2	D	Shiori Koike	1.59 m (5 ft 3 in)	53 kg (117 lb)	21 March 1993 (aged 28)	(Japan) DK Peregrine
3	D	Aoi Shiga	1.65 m (5 ft 5 in)	60 kg (130 lb)	4 July 1999 (aged 22)	(Japan) Toyota Cygnus
4	D	Ayaka Toko – A	1.61 m (5 ft 3 in)	58 kg (128 lb)	22 August 1994 (aged 26)	(Japan) Seibu Princess Rabbits
5	D	Fumika Sasano	1.67 m (5 ft 6 in)	68 kg (150 lb)	26 June 1997 (aged 24)	(Japan) Seibu Princess Rabbits
6	D	Sena Suzuki	1.67 m (5 ft 6 in)	56 kg (123 lb)	4 August 1991 (aged 30)	(Japan) Seibu Princess Rabbits
7	D	Yukiko Kawashima	1.63 m (5 ft 4 in)	63 kg (139 lb)	16 November 1996 (aged 24)	(Japan) DK Peregrine
8	D	Akane Hosoyamada – A	1.63 m (5 ft 4 in)	59 kg (130 lb)	9 March 1992 (aged 29)	(Japan) DK Peregrine
10	F	Haruna Yoneyama	1.60 m (5 ft 3 in)	53 kg (117 lb)	7 November 1991 (aged 29)	(Japan) DK Peregrine
11	F	Mei Miura	1.62 m (5 ft 4 in)	63 kg (139 lb)	16 November 1998 (aged 22)	(Japan) Toyota Cygnus
12	F	Chiho Osawa – C	1.62 m (5 ft 4 in)	63 kg (139 lb)	10 February 1992 (aged 29)	(Sweden) Luleå HF
13	F	Moeko Fujimoto	1.56 m (5 ft 1 in)	51 kg (112 lb)	5 August 1992 (aged 29)	(Japan) Toyota Cygnus
14	F	Haruka Toko	1.67 m (5 ft 6 in)	64 kg (141 lb)	16 March 1997 (aged 24)	(Japan) Seibu Princess Rabbits
15	F	Rui Ukita	1.69 m (5 ft 7 in)	69 kg (152 lb)	6 June 1996 (aged 25)	(Japan) Daishin
16	F	Akane Shiga	1.65 m (5 ft 5 in)	61 kg (134 lb)	3 March 2001 (aged 20)	(Japan) Toyota Cygnus
18	F	Suzuka Taka	1.61 m (5 ft 3 in)	53 kg (117 lb)	16 October 1996 (aged 24)	(Japan) DK Peregrine
19	F	Chika Otaki	1.60 m (5 ft 3 in)	53 kg (117 lb)	14 December 1998 (aged 22)	(Japan) DK Peregrine
21	F	Hanae Kubo	1.68 m (5 ft 6 in)	64 kg (141 lb)	10 December 1982 (aged 38)	(Japan) Seibu Princess Rabbits
22	F	Miho Shishiuchi	1.65 m (5 ft 5 in)	60 kg (130 lb)	21 August 1992 (aged 28)	(Japan) Toyota Cygnus
23	F	Hikaru Yamashita	1.57 m (5 ft 2 in)	54 kg (119 lb)	23 September 2000 (aged 20)	(Japan) Seibu Princess Rabbits
24	F	Makoto Ito	1.66 m (5 ft 5 in)	60 kg (130 lb)	2 May 2004 (aged 17)	(Japan) Daishin
27	F	Remi Koyama	1.46 m (4 ft 9 in)	52 kg (115 lb)	17 July 2000 (aged 21)	(Japan) Seibu Princess Rabbits
28	D	Shiori Yamashita	1.59 m (5 ft 3 in)	52 kg (115 lb)	28 April 2002 (aged 19)	(Japan) Seibu Princess Rabbits
29	G	Mei Sato	1.57 m (5 ft 2 in)	52 kg (115 lb)	21 September 2000 (aged 20)	(Japan) Kushiro Bears
30	G	Akane Konishi	1.66 m (5 ft 5 in)	70 kg (150 lb)	14 August 1995 (aged 26)	(Japan) Seibu Princess Rabbits
