= Linn Ploug Thomsen =

Danish ice hockey player

- Born: 13 July 1999 (age 27) Hvidovre, Denmark
- Height: 177 cm (5 ft 10 in)
- Weight: 68 kg (150 lb; 10 st 10 lb)
- Position: Defense
- Shoots: Left
- DM/Damettan team Former teams: Hvidovre IK; LIU Sharks
- National team: Denmark
- Playing career: 2013–present

Linn Marie Ploug Thomsen (born 13 July 1999) is a Danish ice hockey player and member of the Danish national ice hockey team, currently playing with the Hvidovre IK Kvinder of the Danish KvindeLigaen and Swedish Damettan. During the 2019–20 and 2020–21 seasons, she played with the LIU Sharks women's ice hockey program in the New England Women's Hockey Alliance (NEWHA) conference of the NCAA Division I.

Ploug Thomsen represented Denmark at the Division I Group A tournaments of the IIHF Women's World Championship in 2015, 2016, 2017, 2018, and 2019, and at the Top Division tournament in 2021. As a junior player with the Danish national under-18 team, she participated in the Division I Qualification tournament of the IIHF Women's U18 World Championship in 2015, the Division I tournament in 2016, and the Division I Group B tournament in 2017.
