= 2008–09 RPI Engineers women's ice hockey season =

American college ice hockey team season

The RPI Engineers women's ice hockey team (the "Engineers") had a successful season in 2008–09 under the leadership of John Burke. The club finished as the ECAC Hockey conference’s runner-up at the league tournament. The Engineers defeated Princeton in the quarterfinals, and proceeded to beat Harvard in the semifinals with a 3-2 overtime victory to advance to its first championship appearance. RPI posted an overall record of 19-14-4, including an 11-8-3 ECAC Hockey mark.

== Regular season ==
- October 4: Sonja van der Bliek had 23 saves in a 2-0 win over Boston University
- Between October 24 and October 31, Whitney Naslund was part of three straight victories for the Engineers. During the streak, she scored a goal and assisted in three straight games.
- October 24: Alisa Harrison had her first career goal. She also had two assists as RPI defeated Niagara 5-3.
- October 31: Alison Wright registered two assists as RPI was victorious 5-1 over Brown. Alisa Harrison added a goal and two assists
- December 5: Alison Wright scored the game-winning goal as RPI defeated Quinnipiac 2-1
- December 6: Sonja van der Bliek registered 34 saves in a 3-2 victory over Princeton. Whitney Naslund scored two goals as RPI defeated Princeton 3-2 and Alisa Harrison had a goal and an assist.
- January 10: Despite tying Quinnipiac by a score of 3-3, Whitney Naslund scored two goals.
- January 23: Alison Wright had a goal and an assist as RPI vanquished Clarkson by a 2-1 margin. Alisa Harrison scored the game winner and added an assist.
- February 7: van der Bliek notched 25 saves in a 2-1 victory at Clarkson
- February 14: In a 2-1 victory over Brown, Whitney Naslund scored the game-winning goal
- February 20: van der Bliek registered 26 saves in a 3-1 win over Cornell
- February 21: van der Bliek got 30 saves as RPI beat Colgate by a score of 4-1
- February 24–25: Alison Wright notched two goals and two assists as RPI swept Niagara

== Notable players ==
- Freshman Alisa Harrison led the team in points with 31, and in assists with 19. Her 12 goals ranked second. In games against ECAC opponents, Harrison led the team with 19. In addition, she recorded a point in 22 games (seven games were multiple points). From February 14 to March 7, Alisa Harrison went on a six-game scoring streak. Wright was third in the ECAC in scoring by rookies while ranking 15th overall among all players.
- Whitney Naslund led the team in goals with 15. Four of said goals came on the power play, and four goals were game-winning goals. Naslund ranked second on the Engineers with 14 assists and 29 points. Against the ECAC, Naslund registered 16 points, and led the team with 9 goals scored against ECAC opponents. Of the 36 games Naslund appeared in, she had a point in 21 games. She was the only player on the team to record two goals in three different games
- Freshman goaltender Sonja van der Bliek played in 35 games and accumulated a record of 18-13-4 record. She also had a 2.10 goals against average and a .916 save percentage. Van der Bliek allowed 75 goals, but registered 820 saves. She spent 2146:29 minutes between the pipes while accumulating five shutouts. Between February 7 and March 7, van der Bliek was in net as RPI had a 7-0-1 record
  - In the ECAC, she had an 11-8-3 record with a 2.23 goals against average and a .906 save percentage. In the ECAC Hockey goalies, she ranked sixth in GAA and winning percentage, while standing eighth in save percentage. Against ECAC opponents, she had 474 saves while letting in 49 goals. She logged 1315:50 minutes in ECAC games.
- Alison Wright was third on the team in scoring with 21 points (8 goals, 12 assists). Wright was the team leader in game-winning goals with four. In addition, she was second in power play goals with three.

== Postseason ==
- February 27–28: Sonja van der Bliek allowed one goal on only 64 shots, as RPI swept Princeton in the ECAC Hockey Quarterfinals
- February 27: Alison Wright scored the game-winning goal in double overtime as RPI beat Princeton 2-1 in the ECAC Hockey Quarterfinals
- March 7: RPI defeat Harvard by a 3-2 score in overtime in the ECAC Hockey Semifinals. Alison Wright notched two assists in the win. Whitney Naslund scored two goals.

== Awards and honors ==
- Alisa Harrison, ECAC Hockey Rookie of the Week twice
- Alisa Harrison, Three-time ECAC Hockey Weekly Honor Roll
- Alisa Harrison, ECAC Hockey All-Rookie Team
- Alisa Harrison, RPI hockey's Rookie of the Year
- Whitney Naslund, ECAC Hockey Championship All-Tournament Team
- Whitney Naslund, ECAC Hockey Weekly Honor Roll pick twice
- Whitney Naslund, ECAC Hockey All-Academic
- Sonja van der Bliek, ECAC Hockey Championship All-Tournament Team
- Sonja van der Bliek Three-time ECAC Hockey Goaltender of the Week
- Sonja van der Bliek ECAC Hockey All-Academic
- Sonja van der Bliek Team's Most Valuable Player Award recipient
- Alison Wright, twice named to the ECAC Hockey Weekly Honor Roll
- Alison Wright, ECAC Hockey All-Academic
