= RPI Engineers ice hockey =

RPI Engineers ice hockey may refer to either of the ice hockey teams that represent Rensselaer Polytechnic Institute:

- RPI Engineers men's ice hockey
- RPI Engineers women's ice hockey
