= Romania women's national under-18 ice hockey team =

- The Coat of arms of Romania is the badge used on the players' jerseys.
- Association: Romanian Ice Hockey Federation
- General manager: Ion Stoica
- Head coach: George Pogacean
- Assistants: Cristinel Munteanu
- Captain: Voicu Ana
- Team colors
- IIHF code: ROU

First international
- Austria 12 – 0 Romania (Spittal an der Drau, Austria; 7 January 2016)

Biggest win
- Romania 30 – 0 South Africa (Cape Town, South Africa; 27 January 2026)

Biggest defeat
- Kazakhstan 15 – 0 Romania (Spittal an der Drau, Austria; 8 January 2016)

IIHF World Women's U18 Championships
- Appearances: 3 (first in 2016)
- Best result: 22nd (2016)

International record (W–L–T)
- 3–7–0

The Romania women's national under-18 ice hockey team is the women's national under-18 ice hockey team of Romania. The team is controlled by the Romanian Ice Hockey Federation, a member of the International Ice Hockey Federation. In 2016 the team debuted at the IIHF World Women's U18 Championships where they competed in the Division I Qualification tournament, finishing in last place.

== History ==
In January 2016 the Romanian women's national under-18 ice hockey team debuted at the IIHF World Women's U18 Championships where they played in the 2016 Division I Qualification tournament in Spittal an der Drau and Radenthein, Austria. Romania was placed in Group A with Austria, China and Kazakhstan. The team finished last in Group A's preliminary round after losing all three of their games, which included their largest loss on record after Kazakhstan defeated them 15–0. Romania then progressed to the seventh place classification game against Australia, who had finished last in Group B. Romania was defeated by Australia 6–7 following a shootout and finished the tournament in eighth place. Alina Oprea was selected as the best Romanian player of the tournament.

== International competitions ==
- 2016 IIHF World Women's U18 Championships. Finish: 8th in Division I Qualification (22nd overall)
- 2017 IIHF World Women's U18 Championships. Finish: 4th in Division I B Qualification (24th overall)
- 2025 IIHF World Women's U18 Championships. Finish: 1st in Division III (32nd overall)

== Team roster ==
For the 2016 IIHF Ice Hockey U18 Women's World Championship Division I Qualification

#	Name	Pos	S/G	Age	Club
4	Katalin Adorjan	D	L	26	SC Miercurea Ciuc
18	Voicu Ana (C)	F	L	27	Corona Brasov
6	Orsolya Antal	D	R	25	SC Miercurea Ciuc
21	Bianca Bobu	G	L	25	CSS Triumf Bucharest
12	Ana Chiurtu	D	L	27	Dunarea Galati
11	Franzieska Gosler	F	R	25	Corona Brasov
20	Miruna Ionescu	F	L	26	CSS Triumf Bucharest
5	Renata Istvan	D	L	25	SC Miercurea Ciuc
24	Diana Iuga (A)	F	L	25	SC Miercurea Ciuc
9	Kinga Jakab	F	L	25	SC Miercurea Ciuc
14	Orsolya Jakab	F	L	27	SC Miercurea Ciuc
19	Sabina Jugurica	F	R	26	CSS Triumf Bucharest
1	Andrea Kurko	G	L	28	SC Miercurea Ciuc
13	Nikolett Molnar	F	L	25	SC Miercurea Ciuc
8	Nadina Niciu	D	R	27	CSS Triumf Bucharest
17	Alina Oprea (A)	F	L	27	CSS Triumf Bucharest
3	Vivien Simon	D	R	26	SC Miercurea Ciuc
23	Kata Tamas	D	R	27	SC Miercurea Ciuc
7	Maria Trandafir	D	R	25	CSS Triumf Bucharest
