= Sonja van der Bliek =

Canadian ice hockey goaltender

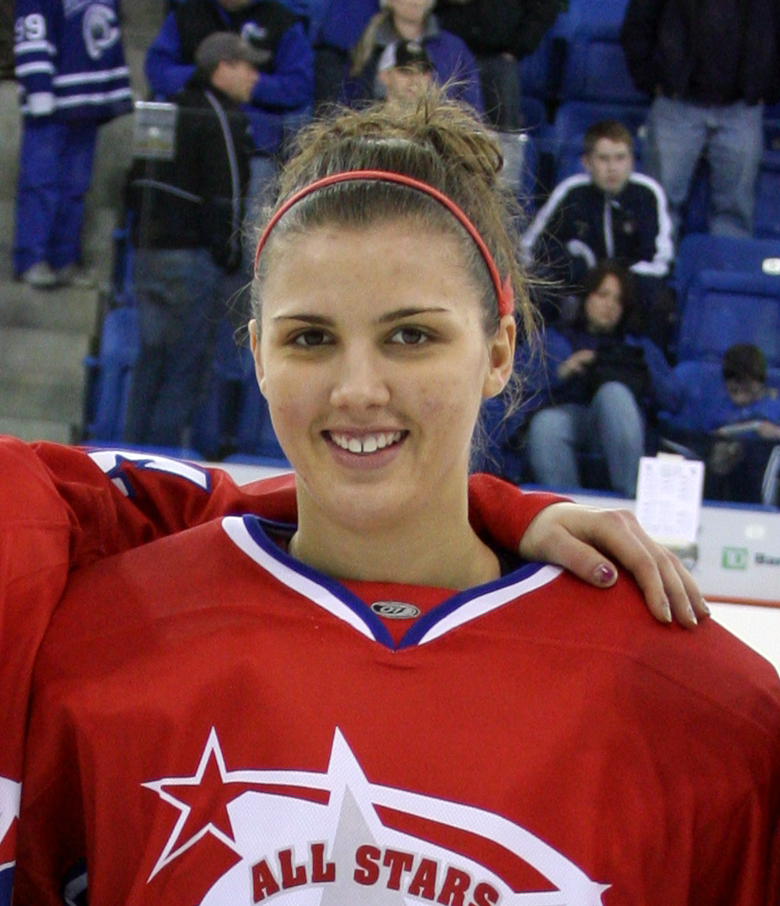
- Sonja van der Bliek in 2010
- Born: July 22, 1989 (age 36) Toronto, Ontario, Canada
- Height: 175 cm (5 ft 9 in)
- Position: Goaltender
- SDHL team Former teams: Brynäs IF; Toronto Furies; Brampton Thunder; Rensselaer Polytechnic Institute
- Playing career: 2011–present

Sonja van der Bliek is a former Canadian ice hockey goaltender, playing with Brynäs IF in the SDHL in the 2018-19 season.

== Career ==
By the time she graduated, she held 12 individual programme records, and was named team MVP in her final year. She was nominated for the 2010 Patty Kazmaier Memorial Award. In 2020, she was inducted into the RPI Athletics Hall of Fame.

After graduation, she signed with the Brampton Thunder in the CWHL. In 2016, she left Brampton to sign with the Toronto Furies, where she spent two years as backup before earning the starting job for the 2017–18 season. Across six years in the CWHL, van der Bliek played in 54 games.

After the CWHL folded, she signed with Brynäs in Sweden In her first season, the team reached the SDHL playoffs, losing to Modo in the first round. and retired from hockey in 2019.

== Personal life ==
She is of Dutch and Norwegian descent.
