= Lilli Friis-Hansen =

Danish ice hockey player (born 2000)

- Born: 27 January 2000 (age 26) Lyngby, Denmark
- Height: 163 cm (5 ft 4 in)
- Weight: 55 kg (121 lb; 8 st 9 lb)
- Position: Forward
- Shoots: Right
- NCAA team Former teams: RPI Engineers; Herlev IK; IC Gentofte
- National team: Denmark
- Playing career: 2012–present

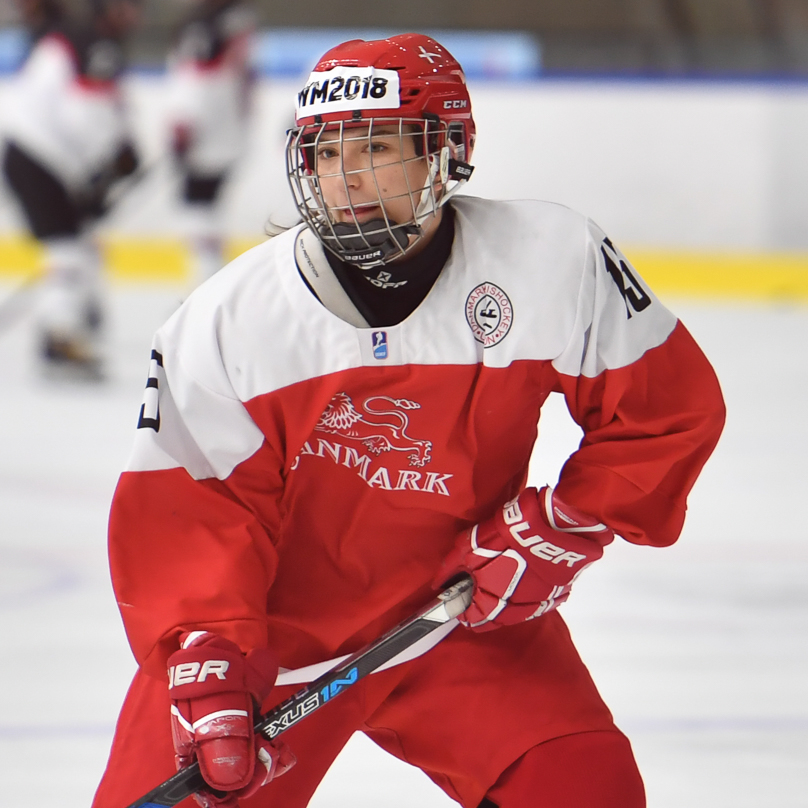
Lilli Friis-Hansen plays for Denmark during a match against Japan on April 16, 2017. The match took place in Graz, Austria during the group stage of the International Ice Hockey Federation's 2017 Women's World Championship, Division 1.

Lilli Pearl Friis-Hansen (born 27 January 2000) is a Danish ice hockey player and member of the Danish national ice hockey team, currently playing with the RPI Engineers women's ice hockey program in the ECAC Hockey conference of the NCAA Division I.

Friis-Hansen represented Denmark in the Division I Group A tournaments of the IIHF Women's World Championship in 2017, 2018 and 2019, and at the Top Division tournament in 2021. As a junior player with the Danish national under-18 team, she participated in the Division I Qualification tournament of the IIHF Women's U18 World Championship in 2015, the Division I tournament in 2016, and the Division I Group B tournaments in 2017 and 2018. She was named best forward of the 2017 tournament by the directorate and, in 2018, she served as team captain and led the tournament with a +12 plus–minus.
