= Romanian Ice Hockey Federation =

Governing body of ice hockey in Romania

Romania
- Association name: Romanian Ice Hockey Federation
- IIHF Code: ROU
- IIHF membership: January 24, 1924
- President: Halauca Alexandru
- IIHF men's ranking: 23nd
- IIHF women's ranking: 34nd

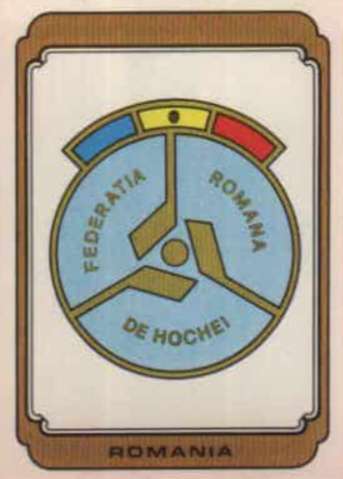
Former Romanian Hockey Federation logo (1979)

The Romanian Ice Hockey Federation (Romanian: Federaţia Română de Hochei pe Gheaţă, FRHG) is the governing body that oversees ice hockey in Romania.

== National teams ==
- Romania men's national ice hockey team
- Romania men's national junior ice hockey team
- Romania men's national under-18 ice hockey team
- Romania women's national ice hockey team
- Romania women's national under-18 ice hockey team
