= 2025 IIHF U18 Women's World Championship Division III =

International youth ice hockey tournament

Tournament details
- Host country: Croatia
- City: Zagreb
- Venue: 1 (in 1 host city)
- Dates: 23–26 January 2025
- Teams: 4

Tournament statistics
- Games played: 6
- Goals scored: 39 (6.5 per game)
- Attendance: 729 (122 per game)
- Scoring leader: (Romania) Anna Vitos (6 points)

Official website
- www.iihf.com

The 2025 IIHF U18 Women's World Championship Division III was an international under-18 women's ice hockey tournament organized by the International Ice Hockey Federation (IIHF). It was played in Zagreb, Croatia, from 23 to 26 January 2025. Division III represented the sixth tier of the IIHF U18 Women's World Championship. This was the first edition of Division III of women's U18 ice hockey world championship.

== Participating teams ==
Team	Qualification
Romania	First participation in World Championship since 2017
Croatia	Hosts; first participation in World Championship
Lithuania	First participation in World Championship
Thailand	First participation in World Championship

== Standings ==
Pos	Team	Pld	W	OTW	OTL	L	GF	GA	GD	Pts	Promotion
1	Romania	3	2	1	0	0	17	8	+9	8	Promoted to the 2026 Division II B
2	Thailand	3	1	0	1	1	8	8	0	4	
3	Croatia (H)	3	1	0	0	2	7	9	−2	3	
4	Lithuania	3	1	0	0	2	7	14	−7	3	

Source: IIHF
Rules for classification: 1) points; 2) head-to-head points; 3) head-to-head goal difference; 4) head-to-head number of goals scored; 5) result against closest best-ranked team outside tied teams; 6) result against second-best ranked team outside tied teams; 7) seeding before tournament.
(H) Host

== Match results ==
All times are local (Central European Time – UTC+1).

23 January 2025; 15:30	Lithuania	4–3 (1–0, 1–1, 2–2)	Thailand	Admiral Ice Dome, Zagreb; Attendance: 27

Game reference
10 min	Penalties	2 min
37	Shots	35

23 January 2025; 19:30	Romania	6–3 (2–0, 2–1, 2–2)	Croatia	Admiral Ice Dome, Zagreb; Attendance: 122

Game reference
16 min	Penalties	6 min
27	Shots	33

24 January 2025; 15:30	Romania	3–2 OT (0–0, 0–0, 2–2) (OT: 1–0)	Thailand	Admiral Ice Dome, Zagreb; Attendance: 27

Game reference
8 min	Penalties	8 min
39	Shots	25

24 January 2025; 19:30	Croatia	3–0 (0–0, 2–0, 1–0)	Lithuania	Admiral Ice Dome, Zagreb; Attendance: 106

Game reference
4 min	Penalties	14 min
23	Shots	23

26 January 2025; 15:30	Lithuania	3–8 (1–2, 0–5, 2–1)	Romania	Admiral Ice Dome, Zagreb; Attendance: 37

Game reference
2 min	Penalties	6 min
30	Shots	35

26 January 2025; 19:30	Thailand	3–1 (2–0, 0–0, 1–1)	Croatia	Admiral Ice Dome, Zagreb; Attendance: 410

Game reference
10 min	Penalties	18 min
36	Shots	17
