= Emily Nix =

German ice hockey player (born 1998)

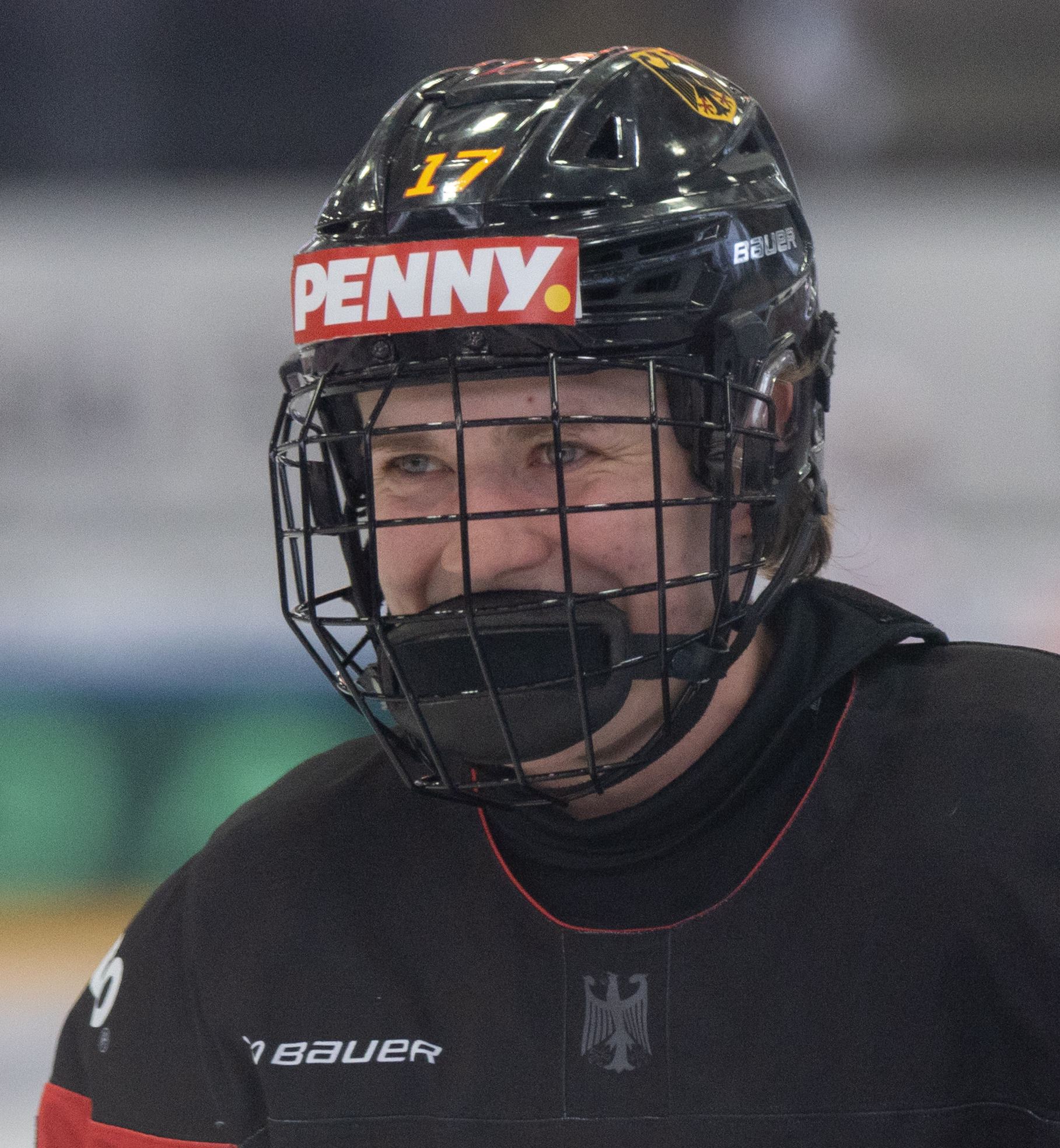
- Born: 12 January 1998 (age 28) Hamburg, Germany
- Height: 1.75 m (5 ft 9 in)
- Weight: 75 kg (165 lb; 11 st 11 lb)
- Position: Forward
- Shoots: Left
- SDHL team Former teams: SDE HF: Eisbären Juniors Berlin; OSC Eisladies Berlin; Hamburger SV; Hannover Lady Scorpions; HV71; ERC Ingolstadt; Crocodiles Hamburg
- National team: Germany
- Playing career: 2013–present

Anna Emily Nix (born 12 January 1998) is a German ice hockey player and member of the German national team. She is signed with SDE Hockey in the Swedish Women's Hockey League (SDHL) through the 2025–26 season.

== International play ==
As a junior player with the German national under-18 ice hockey team, she participated in the Division I Group A tournaments of the IIHF Women's U18 World Championships in 2014, 2015, and 2016. At the 2015 tournament, she was named Germany's best player by the coaches. In 2016, Nix lead the tournament in assists (6), points (8), and plus–minus (+8), and was selected as Best Forward by the tournament directorate.

Nix represented Germany with the senior national team at the IIHF Women's World Championships in 2019 and 2024.

In Germany's fourth game of Group B play at the 2026 Winter Olympics, Nix contributed a goal in a 2-1 win versus France.
