= Franziska Albl =

German ice hockey player

- Born: 29 April 1994 (age 31) Füssen, Germany
- Height: 5 ft 6 in (168 cm)
- Weight: 148 lb (67 kg; 10 st 8 lb)
- Position: Goaltender
- Catches: Left
- DFEL team Former teams: Wanderers Germering; ECDC Memmingen; EC Pfaffenhofen; TSV Erding; ESC Planegg
- National team: Germany
- Playing career: 2008–present

Franziska Albl (born 29 April 1995) is a German ice hockey player for the Wanderers Germering and the German national team.

She participated at the 2015 IIHF Women's World Championship as well as 2017 and 2021.
