= 2018 IIHF U18 Women's World Championship Division I =

Women's ice hockey tournament

2018 IIHF World Women's U18 Championship Division I
Tournament details
- Host countries: Italy; Poland; Mexico
- Venues: 3 (in 3 host cities)
- Dates: 8–14 January 2018; 6–12 January 2018; 30 January – 4 February 2018
- Teams: 17

The 2018 IIHF U18 Women's World Championship Division I was three international under-18 women's ice hockey tournaments organized by the International Ice Hockey Federation (IIHF). Divisions I A, I B and I B Q represented the second, third and fourth tier of competition at the 2018 IIHF World Women's U18 Championship.

== Division I Group A ==
2018 IIHF World Women's U18 Championship Division I A

Tournament details
- Host country: Italy
- Venue: 1 (in 1 host city)
- Dates: 8–14 January 2018
- Teams: 6

Official website
- IIHF.com

The Group A tournament was held in Asiago, Italy from 8 to 14 January 2018. Having just been relegated to Division I in 2017, Japan entered the tournament with something to prove, handily winning all five matches in regulation and reclaiming their place in the Top Division. Despite eking out a shootout win against Hungary, Norway amassed the fewest points and were relegated to Division I Group B.

=== Final standings ===
Pos	Team	Pld	W	OTW	OTL	L	GF	GA	GD	Pts	Promotion or relegation
1	Japan	5	5	0	0	0	21	1	+20	15	Promoted to the 2019 Top Division
2	Slovakia	5	3	1	0	1	18	11	+7	11	
3	Italy (H)	5	2	0	1	2	13	14	−1	7	
4	Austria	5	2	0	0	3	10	17	−7	6	
5	Hungary	5	1	0	1	3	8	18	−10	4	
6	Norway	5	0	1	0	4	4	13	−9	2	Relegated to the 2019 Division I B

Source: IIHF
Rules for classification: 1) points; 2) head-to-head points; 3) head-to-head goal difference; 4) head-to-head number of goals scored; 5) result against closest best-ranked team outside tied teams; 6) result against second-best ranked team outside tied teams; 7) seeding before tournament.
(H) Host

=== Results ===
8 January 2018; 14:00	Hungary	2–6 (1–3, 1–1, 0–2)	Slovakia	Pala Hodegart, Asiago

Game reference

8 January 2018; 17:30	Austria	3–1 (0–1, 3–0, 0–0)	Norway	Pala Hodegart, Asiago

Game reference

8 January 2018; 21:00	Italy	0–2 (0–1, 0–0, 0–1)	Japan	Pala Hodegart, Asiago

Game reference

9 January 2018; 13:30	Slovakia	5–2 (3–1, 2–1, 0–0)	Austria	Pala Hodegart, Asiago

Game reference

9 January 2018; 17:00	Japan	6–1 (1–1, 1–0, 4–0)	Hungary	Pala Hodegart, Asiago

Game reference

9 January 2018; 20:30	Norway	0–1 (0–0, 0–1, 0–0)	Italy	Pala Hodegart, Asiago

Game reference

11 January 2018; 13:30	Japan	5–0 (0–0, 4–0, 1–0)	Austria	Pala Hodegart, Asiago

Game reference

11 January 2018; 17:00	Slovakia	2–0 (0–0, 0–0, 2–0)	Norway	Pala Hodegart, Asiago

Game reference

11 January 2018; 20:30	Italy	2–3 (1–0, 1–1, 0–2)	Hungary	Pala Hodegart, Asiago

Game reference

12 January 2018; 13:30	Norway	0–5 (0–0, 0–2, 0–3)	Japan	Pala Hodegart, Asiago

Game reference

12 January 2018; 17:00	Hungary	0–1 (0–1, 0–0, 0–0)	Austria	Pala Hodegart, Asiago

Game reference

12 January 2018; 20:30	Slovakia	5–4 OT (1–1, 1–3, 2–0); OT: (1–0)	Italy	Pala Hodegart, Asiago

Game reference

14 January 2018; 13:30	Norway	3–2 GWS (2–1, 0–0, 0–1); OT: (0–0) GWS: (1–0)	Hungary	Pala Hodegart, Asiago

Game reference

14 January 2018; 17:00	Japan	3–0 (3–0, 0–0, 0–0)	Slovakia	Pala Hodegart, Asiago

Game reference

14 January 2018; 20:30	Austria	4–6 (0–1, 4–2, 0–3)	Italy	Pala Hodegart, Asiago

Game reference

=== Statistics ===
==== Scoring leaders ====
Pos	Player	Country	GP	G	A	Pts	+/−	PIM
1	Diana Vargová	Slovakia	5	3	6	9	+4	0
2	Nadia Mattivi	Italy	5	6	2	8	+7	16
3	Moeka Tsutsumi	Japan	5	3	5	8	+4	0
4	Theresa Schafzahl	Austria	5	5	1	6	+3	4
5	Remi Koyama	Japan	5	3	3	6	+5	2
6	Patrícia Ágoštonová	Slovakia	5	4	1	5	+3	4
6	Kaho Suzuki	Japan	5	4	1	5	+4	2
8	Lívia Kúbeková	Slovakia	5	3	2	5	+5	6
9	Anna Caumo	Italy	5	1	4	5	+4	4
9	Nikola Nemčeková	Slovakia	5	1	4	5	+2	4

GP = Games played; G = Goals; A = Assists; Pts = Points; +/− = P Plus–minus; PIM = Penalties in minutes
Source: IIHF.com

==== Goaltending leaders ====
(minimum 40% team's total ice time)

Pos	Player	Country	TOI	GA	GAA	Sv%	SO
1	Reika Sasaki	Japan	263:04	1	0.23	97.87	2
2	Ena Nystrøm	Norway	242:26	7	1.73	93.14	0
3	Sara Belli	Italy	300:57	14	2.79	91.72	1
4	Anja Adamitsch	Austria	220:36	11	2.99	91.06	1
5	Andrea Rišianová	Slovakia	272:56	11	2.42	89.42	1

TOI = Time on ice (minutes:seconds); GA = Goals against; GAA = Goals against average; Sv% = Save percentage; SO = Shutouts
Source: IIHF.com

=== Awards ===
==== Best players selected by the directorate ====
- Best Goalkeeper: (Norway) Ena Nystrøm
- Best Defenseman: (Italy) Nadia Mattivi
- Best Forward: (Austria) Theresa Schafzahl

Source: IIHF.com

==== Best players of each team selected by the coaches ====
- (Austria) Leoni Geifes (D)
- (Hungary) Míra Seregély (F)
- (Italy) Nadia Mattivi (D)
- (Japan) Remi Koyama (F)
- (Norway) Ena Nystrøm (G)
- (Slovakia) Lívia Kúbeková (F)

Source: IIHF.com

== Division I Group B ==
2018 IIHF World Women's U18 Championship Division I B

Tournament details
- Host country: Poland
- Venue: 1 (in 1 host city)
- Dates: 6–12 January 2018
- Teams: 6

Official website
- IIHF.com

The Group B tournament was held in Katowice, Poland from 6 to 12 January 2018. Denmark won the tournament with a +27 goal difference and were promoted to Division I Group A. With only one point earned in five games, Australia was relegated to Division I Group B Qualification.

Danish defenceman Amanda Refsgaard was the highest scoring player of the tournament, notching 4 goals and 6 assists. Seven of the highest scoring players were Danish, including all five of the top ranked players. The leading scorer from a team other than Denmark was forward Elise Lombard of France, who ranked sixth overall with 4 goals and 2 assists.

Denmark also topped the charts on the goaltending front, with goaltenders Martine Terrida and Emma-Sofie Nordström ranking first and second in both goals against average (GAA) and save percentage (Sv%). Goaltender Martyna Sass of Poland recorded the highest time on ice at 258 minutes, nearly fifteen minutes more than any other goaltender at the tournament.

=== Final standings ===
Pos	Team	Pld	W	OTW	OTL	L	GF	GA	GD	Pts	Promotion or relegation
1	Denmark	5	5	0	0	0	30	3	+27	15	Promoted to the 2019 Division I A
2	France	5	4	0	0	1	16	6	+10	12	
3	Poland (H)	5	3	0	0	2	17	9	+8	9	
4	China	5	1	1	0	3	9	22	−13	5	
5	Great Britain	5	1	0	0	4	7	15	−8	3	
6	Australia	5	0	0	1	4	6	30	−24	1	Relegated to the 2019 Division I B Qualification

Source: IIHF
Rules for classification: 1) points; 2) head-to-head points; 3) head-to-head goal difference; 4) head-to-head number of goals scored; 5) result against closest best-ranked team outside tied teams; 6) result against second-best ranked team outside tied teams; 7) seeding before tournament.
(H) Host

=== Results ===
6 January 2018; 13:00	Great Britain	1–6 (0–3, 0–3, 1–0)	Denmark	Spodek, Katowice

Game reference

6 January 2018; 16:30	China	1–5 (0–2, 0–1, 1–2)	Poland	Spodek, Katowice

Game reference

6 January 2018; 20:00	Australia	1–6 (0–3, 0–1, 1–2)	France	Spodek, Katowice

Game reference

7 January 2018; 13:00	France	2–0 (0–0, 0–0, 2–0)	Great Britain	Spodek, Katowice

Game reference

7 January 2018; 16:30	Poland	8–2 (2–0, 4–1, 2–1)	Australia	Spodek, Katowice

Game reference

7 January 2018; 20:00	Denmark	10–0 (2–0, 5–0, 3–0)	China	Spodek, Katowice

Game reference

9 January 2018; 13:00	France	5–2 (1–1, 1–0, 3–1)	China	Spodek, Katowice

Game reference

9 January 2018; 16:30	Denmark	3–1 (0–1, 0–0, 3–0)	Poland	Spodek, Katowice

Game reference

9 January 2018; 20:00	Australia	1–5 (0–0, 1–2, 0–3)	Great Britain	Spodek, Katowice

Game reference

11 January 2018; 13:00	Denmark	9–1 (5–1, 3–0, 1–0)	Australia	Spodek, Katowice

Game reference

11 January 2018; 16:30	Poland	1–3 (0–0, 0–2, 1–1)	France	Spodek, Katowice

Game reference

11 January 2018; 20:00	Great Britain	1–4 (0–1, 0–0, 1–3)	China	Spodek, Katowice

Game reference

12 January 2018; 13:00	China	2–1 OT (0–0, 1–1, 0–0); OT: (1–0)	Australia	Spodek, Katowice

Game reference

12 January 2018; 16:30	France	0–2 (0–2, 0–0, 0–0)	Denmark	Spodek, Katowice

Game reference

12 January 2018; 20:00	Poland	2–0 (1–0, 0–0, 1–0)	Great Britain	Spodek, Katowice

Game reference

=== Statistics ===
==== Scoring leaders ====
Pos	Player	Country	GP	G	A	Pts	+/−	PIM
1	Amanda Refsgaard	Denmark	5	4	6	10	10	2
2	Julie Oksbjerg	Denmark	5	4	4	8	4	2
3	Sofie Damgaard	Denmark	5	3	5	8	10	6
4	Lilli Friis-Hansen	Denmark	5	3	4	7	12	10
4	Julie Henriksen	Denmark	5	3	4	7	6	4
6	Elise Lombard	France	5	4	2	6	5	2
7	Mille Sørensen	Denmark	5	3	3	6	5	2
8	Signe Jensen	Denmark	5	2	4	6	8	2
8	Alicja Siejka	Poland	5	2	4	6	3	2
10	Alicja Wcislo	Poland	5	0	6	6	8	4

GP = Games played; G = Goals; A = Assists; Pts = Points; +/− = P Plus–minus; PIM = Penalties in minutes
Source: IIHF.com

==== Goaltending leaders ====
(minimum 40% team's total ice time)

Pos	Player	Country	TOI	GA	GAA	Sv%	SO
1	Martine Terrida	Denmark	180:00	2	0.67	95.74	1
2	Emma-Sofie Nordström	Denmark	120:00	1	0.50	95.45	1
3	Justine Crousy Theode	France	238:35	6	1.51	94.44	0
4	Martyna Sass	Poland	258:00	5	1.16	92.86	1
5	Maisie Gilbert	Great Britain	180:00	7	2.33	91.36	0

TOI = Time on ice (minutes:seconds); GA = Goals against; GAA = Goals against average; Sv% = Save percentage; SO = Shutouts
Source: IIHF.com

=== Awards ===
==== Best players selected by the directorate ====
- Best Goalkeeper: (Poland) Martyna Sass
- Best Defenseman: (Denmark) Amanda Refsgaard
- Best Forward (France) Elise Lombard

Source: IIHF.com

==== Best players of each team selected by the coaches ====
- (Australia) Emily Davis-Tope (F)
- (China) Fu Chunyang (D)
- (Denmark) Julie Oksbjerg (F)
- (France) Justine Crousy Theode (G)
- (United Kingdom) Jemma Wallis (D)
- (Poland) Alicja Wcislo (D)

Source: IIHF.com

== Division I Group B Qualification ==
2018 IIHF World Women's U18 Championship Division I B Q

Tournament details
- Host country: Mexico
- Venue: 1 (in 1 host city)
- Dates: 30 January – 4 February 2018
- Teams: 5

Official website
- IIHF.com

The Group B Qualification tournament was held in Mexico City, Mexico from 30 January to 4 February 2018. The Netherlands won promotion to Division I Group B.

=== Final standings ===
Pos	Team	Pld	W	OTW	OTL	L	GF	GA	GD	Pts	Promotion
1	Netherlands	4	4	0	0	0	25	5	+20	12	Promoted to the 2019 Division I B
2	Mexico (H)	4	3	0	0	1	11	9	+2	9	
3	Spain	4	2	0	0	2	16	9	+7	6	
4	Kazakhstan	4	1	0	0	3	20	13	+7	3	
5	Turkey	4	0	0	0	4	3	39	−36	0	

Source: IIHF
Rules for classification: 1) points; 2) head-to-head points; 3) head-to-head goal difference; 4) head-to-head number of goals scored; 5) result against closest best-ranked team outside tied teams; 6) result against second-best ranked team outside tied teams; 7) seeding before tournament.
(H) Host

=== Results ===
30 January 2018; 16:30	Netherlands	4–2 (0–0, 2–2, 2–0)	Spain	Ice Dome, Mexico City

Game reference

30 January 2018; 20:10	Mexico	4–3 (0–3, 2–0, 2–0)	Kazakhstan	Ice Dome, Mexico City

Game reference

31 January 2018; 13:30	Turkey	1–12 (0–5, 1–4, 0–3)	Netherlands	Ice Dome, Mexico City

Game reference

1 February 2018; 16:30	Kazakhstan	14–1 (5–0, 5–1, 4–0)	Turkey	Ice Dome, Mexico City

Game reference

1 February 2018; 20:00	Spain	1–4 (0–0, 1–3, 0–1)	Mexico	Ice Dome, Mexico City

Game reference

2 February 2018; 20:00	Netherlands	5–2 (2–1, 1–1, 2–0)	Kazakhstan	Ice Dome, Mexico City

Game reference

3 February 2018; 16:30	Spain	10–0 (2–0, 1–0, 7–0)	Turkey	Ice Dome, Mexico City

Game reference

3 February 2018; 20:00	Mexico	0–4 (0–1, 0–1, 0–2)	Netherlands	Ice Dome, Mexico City

Game reference

4 February 2018; 16:30	Kazakhstan	1–3 (0–2, 1–0, 0–1)	Spain	Ice Dome, Mexico City

Game reference

4 February 2018; 20:00	Turkey	1–3 (1–0, 0–1, 0–2)	Mexico	Ice Dome, Mexico City

Game reference

=== Statistics ===
==== Scoring leaders ====
Pos	Player	Country	GP	G	A	Pts	+/−	PIM
1	Maree Dijkema	Netherlands	4	5	7	12	+10	2
2	Isabelle Schollaardt	Netherlands	4	5	6	11	+8	16
3	Larissa Haverkorn	Netherlands	4	6	3	9	+10	2
4	Yekaterina Kutsenko	Kazakhstan	4	4	4	8	+7	8
5	Alexandra Golotvina	Kazakhstan	4	3	4	7	+6	0
5	Joanna Rojas	Mexico	4	3	4	7	+1	6
7	Tomiris Ospanova	Kazakhstan	4	2	4	6	+7	6
8	Romy Brouwers	Netherlands	4	1	5	6	+10	0
9	Andrea Merino	Spain	4	3	2	5	+3	6
10	Sara Molina	Spain	4	2	3	5	+1	2

GP = Games played; G = Goals; A = Assists; Pts = Points; +/− = P Plus–minus; PIM = Penalties in minutes
Source: IIHF.com

==== Goaltending leaders ====
(minimum 40% team's total ice time)

Pos	Player	Country	TOI	GA	GAA	Sv%	SO
1	Emma Fondse	Netherlands	120:00	1	0.50	98.04	1
2	Eline Gabriele	Netherlands	120:00	4	2.00	94.29	0
3	Polina Govtva	Kazakhstan	114:28	6	3.15	88.46	0
4	Paola Garcia	Mexico	177:00	8	2.71	88.41	0
5	Lucía Insenser	Spain	180:00	5	1.67	87.50	1

TOI = Time on ice (minutes:seconds); GA = Goals against; GAA = Goals against average; Sv% = Save percentage; SO = Shutouts
Source: IIHF.com

=== Awards ===
==== Best players selected by the directorate ====
- Best Goalkeeper: (Netherlands) Emma Fondse
- Best Defenseman: (Netherlands) Romy Brouwers
- Best Forward: (Mexico) Joanna Rojas

Source: IIHF.com

==== Best players of each team selected by the coaches ====
- (Spain) Marta Martín (D)
- (Kazakhstan) Zhanel Kozgulova (D)
- (Mexico) Joanna Rojas (F)
- (Netherlands) Maree Dijkema (F)
- (Turkey) Melisa Figenli (F)

Source: IIHF.com
