= Amanda Refsgaard =

Danish ice hockey player

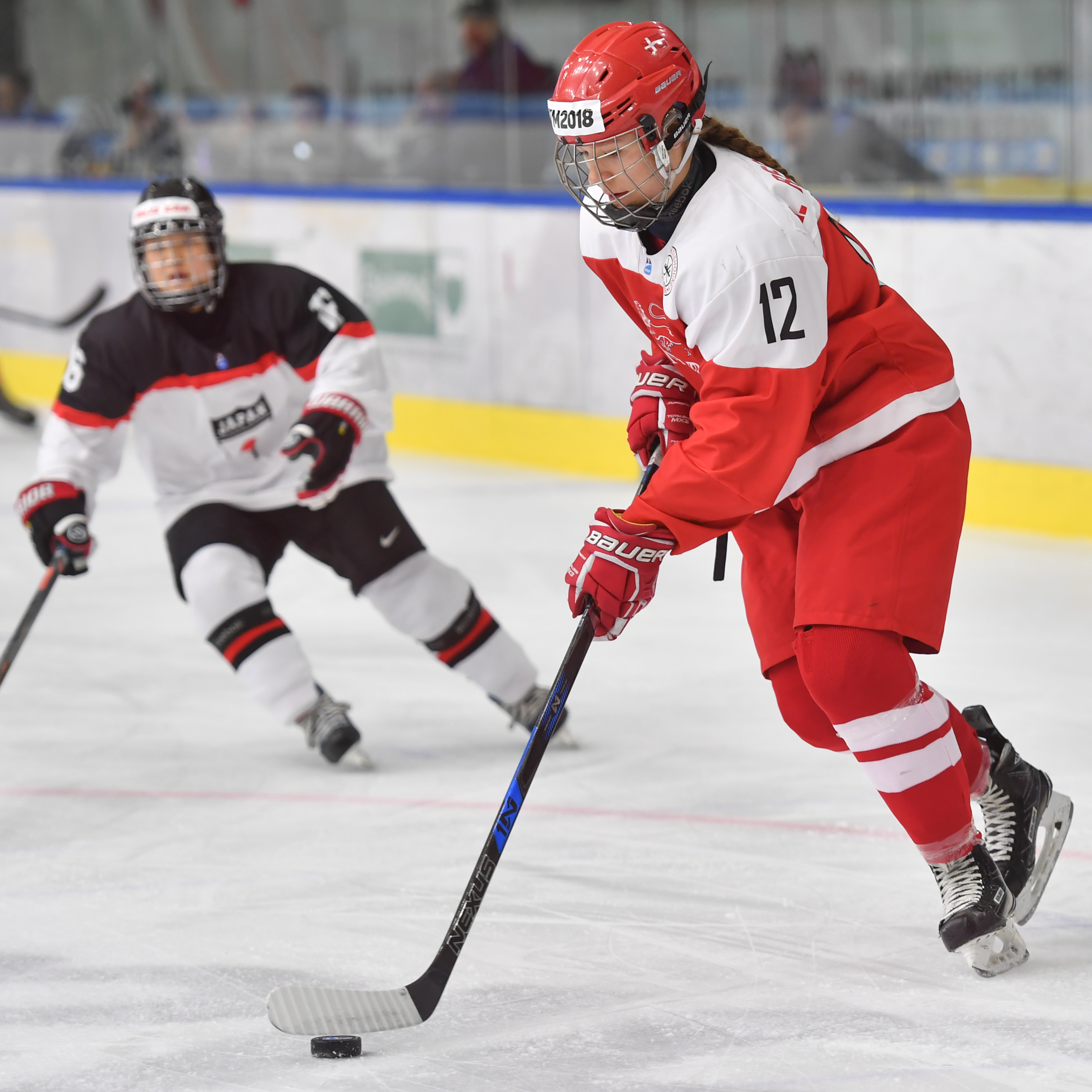
- Refsgaard representing Denmark in a World Championship Division I match versus Japan in 2017.
- Born: 8 March 2000 (age 26) Hørsholm, Denmark
- Height: 175 cm (5 ft 9 in)
- Weight: 63 kg (139 lb; 9 st 13 lb)
- Position: Defense
- Shoots: Left
- DM team Former teams: Rødovre Mighty Bulls; Herlev IK; Hvidovre IK; Gentofte Stars
- National team: Denmark
- Playing career: 2014–present

Amanda Normann Refsgaard (born 8 March 2000) is a Danish ice hockey player and member of the Danish national ice hockey team, currently playing with the Rødovre Mighty Bulls Q of the KvindeLigaen (DM i ishockey for kvinder).

Refsgaard represented Denmark at the IIHF Women's World Championship in 2021 and at the World Championship Division I Group A tournaments in 2017 and 2018. As a junior player with the Danish national under-18 team, she participated in the Division I Qualification tournament of the IIHF Women's U18 World Championship in 2015, the Division I tournament in 2016, and the Division I Group B tournaments in 2017 and 2018. While serving as an alternate captain at the 2018 IIHF U18 World Championship Division 1B, she recorded both the most assists (6) and most points (10) of any player in the tournament and the most goals (4) by a defenceman. The breakout performance was capped by her selection as Best Defenseman of the tournament by the directorate.

== Career statistics ==
=== International ===
Year	Team	Event	Result	GP	G	A	Pts	PIM
2015	Denmark	U18 D1Q	1st	5	0	0	0	0
2016	Denmark	U18 D1	6th	5	0	0	0	0
2017	Denmark	U18 D1B	2nd	5	1	4	5	10
2017	Denmark	WC D1A	4th	5	0	0	0	8
2018	Denmark	U18 D1B	1st	5	4	6	10	2
2018	Denmark	WC D1A	4th	5	0	0	0	0
2021	Denmark	WC	10th	3	0	0	0	0
2021	Denmark	OGQ	Q	3	0	0	0	0
Junior totals				20	5	10	15	12
Senior totals				16	0	0	0	8
