= 2017 IIHF U18 Women's World Championship Division I =

2017 IIHF World Women's U18 Championship Division I
- Logos of the Division I tournaments

Tournament details
- Host countries: Hungary; Poland; Spain
- Venues: 3 (in 3 host cities)
- Dates: 8–14 January 2017; 26–29 January 2017
- Teams: 16

The 2017 IIHF U18 Women's World Championship Division I Group A, Group B and Group B Qualification were three international under-18 women's ice hockey tournaments run by the International Ice Hockey Federation. The tournaments made up the second, third and fourth levels of competition at the 2017 IIHF World Women's U18 Championships respectively. The Division I Group A tournament took place between 8 January and 14 January 2017 in Budapest, Hungary. The tournament was won by Germany who gained promotion to the Championship Division for 2018 while France finished last and was relegated to the Division I Group B competition. The Division I Group B tournament took place between 8 January and 14 January 2017 in Katowice, Poland. Italy won the tournament and gained promotion to Division I Group A while Kazakhstan was relegated to Division I Group B Qualification after finishing in last place. The Division I Group B Qualification tournament was held in San Sebastián, Spain from 26 January to 29 January 2017. The tournament was won by Australia who gained promotion to Division I Group B for 2018.

== Division I Group A tournament ==
Division I Group A
Tournament details
- Host country: Hungary
- Venue: 1 (in 1 host city)
- Dates: 8–14 January 2017
- Teams: 6

Tournament statistics
- Games played: 15
- Goals scored: 72 (4.8 per game)
- Attendance: 2,246 (150 per game)
- Scoring leader: Millie Sirum

The Division I Group A tournament began on 8 January 2017 in Budapest, Hungary with games played at Tüskecsarnok. Germany, Hungary, Norway and Slovakia returned to the competition after missing promotion to the Championship Division at the previous years World Championships. Austria gained promotion to Division I Group A after finishing first in last years Division I Qualification and France was relegated from the Championship Division after failing to survive the relegation round at the 2016 IIHF World Women's U18 Championship.

Germany won the tournament after finishing first in the group standings with twelve points and gained promotion to the Championship Division for the 2018 IIHF World Women's U18 Championships. Slovakia also finished on twelve points however their loss to Germany placed them second due to tie-break rules. Norway finished in third place with eight points. France finished the tournament in last place after losing all five of their games and was relegated to Division I Group B for 2018. Millie Sirum of Norway finished as the top scorer of the tournament with eight points and was named best forward by the IIHF directorate. Hungary's Yumi Maruyama led the tournament in goaltending with a save percentage of 95.31. The directorate however named Johanna May of Germany as the tournaments best goaltender and named Norway's Lene Tendenes as the best defenceman.

=== Standings ===
Team	Pld	W	OTW	OTL	L	GF	GA	GD	Pts	Promotion or relegation
Germany	5	4	0	0	1	18	5	+13	12	Promoted to the 2018 Top Division
Slovakia	5	4	0	0	1	17	6	+11	12	
Norway	5	2	1	0	2	14	14	0	8	
Hungary	5	2	0	0	3	9	13	−4	6	
Austria	5	2	0	0	3	7	16	−9	6	
France	5	0	0	1	4	7	18	−11	1	Relegated to 2018 Division I Group B

Source: IIHF

=== Fixtures ===
All times are local. (CET – UTC+01:00)

8 January 2017; 19:00	Austria	2 – 1 (1–1, 0–0, 1–0)	France	Tüskecsarnok; Attendance: 98

Game reference
4 min	Penalties	6 min
36	Shots	22

8 January 2017; 15:30	Norway	3 – 2 (1–1, 0–1, 2–0)	Germany	Tüskecsarnok; Attendance: 116

Game reference
6 min	Penalties	6 min
23	Shots	28

8 January 2017; 19:00	Hungary	0 – 4 (0–0, 0–3, 0–1)	Slovakia	Tüskecsarnok; Attendance: 335

Game reference
12 min	Penalties	14 min
19	Shots	36

9 January 2017; 12:00	France	2 – 3 OT (1–1, 0–0, 1–1, 0–1)	Norway	Tüskecsarnok; Attendance: 158

Game reference
8 min	Penalties	8 min
20	Shots	50

9 January 2017; 15:30	Slovakia	3 – 2 (1–0, 1–0, 1–2)	Austria	Tüskecsarnok; Attendance: 66

Game reference
4 min	Penalties	14 min
55	Shots	13

9 January 2017; 19:00	Germany	3 – 0 (1–0, 1–0, 1–0)	Hungary	Tüskecsarnok; Attendance: 210

Game reference
4 min	Penalties	10 min
38	Shots	17

11 January 2017; 12:00	Germany	2 – 0 (1–0, 1–0, 0–0)	Slovakia	Tüskecsarnok; Attendance: 86

Game reference
12 min	Penalties	14 min
31	Shots	28

11 January 2017; 15:30	Austria	3 – 2 (2–0, 0–1, 1–1)	Norway	Tüskecsarnok; Attendance: 92

Game reference
14 min	Penalties	22 min
37	Shots	46

11 January 2017; 19:00	France	1 – 3 (0–0, 1–0, 0–3)	Hungary	Tüskecsarnok; Attendance: 245

Game reference
32 min	Penalties	22 min
30	Shots	34

12 January 2017; 12:00	Germany	7 – 0 (3–0, 1–0, 3–0)	Austria	Tüskecsarnok; Attendance: 48

Game reference
8 min	Penalties	6 min
46	Shots	18

12 January 2017; 15:30	Slovakia	6 – 1 (2–0, 1–0, 3–1)	France	Tüskecsarnok; Attendance: 64

Game reference
6 min	Penalties	8 min
43	Shots	15

12 January 2017; 19:00	Norway	5 – 3 (0–2, 2–0, 3–1)	Hungary	Tüskecsarnok; Attendance: 218

Game reference
2 min	Penalties	10 min
36	Shots	16

14 January 2017; 12:00	Slovakia	4 – 1 (1–0, 1–1, 2–0)	Norway	Tüskecsarnok; Attendance: 68

Game reference
10 min	Penalties	14 min
41	Shots	19

14 January 2017; 15:30	France	2 – 4 (0–1, 1–2, 1–1)	Germany	Tüskecsarnok; Attendance: 82

Game reference
4 min	Penalties	2 min
21	Shots	32

14 January 2017; 19:00	Hungary	3 – 0 (0–0, 2–0, 1–0)	Austria	Tüskecsarnok; Attendance: 360

Game reference
10 min	Penalties	14 min
25	Shots	26

=== Scoring leaders ===
List shows the top ten skaters sorted by points, then goals.

Player	GP	G	A	Pts	+/-	PIM	POS
(Norway) Millie Sirum	5	1	7	8	0	4	F
(Norway) Emilie Johansen	5	5	2	7	+1	10	F
(Slovakia) Nikola Rumanova	5	2	4	6	+4	4	F
(Norway) Lene Tendenes	5	2	4	6	+1	10	D
(Norway) Emma Bergesen	5	1	5	6	–1	2	D
(Hungary) Dominika Horvath	5	3	2	5	–3	2	F
(Austria) Laura Luftenegger	5	2	3	5	–1	6	F
(Slovakia) Tatiana Istocyova	5	1	4	5	+4	0	D
(Austria) Theresa Schafzahl	5	1	4	5	+2	8	F
(France) Chloe Aurard	5	4	0	4	–2	10	F
(Slovakia) Lucia Haluskova	5	4	0	4	+3	2	F

=== Leading goaltenders ===
Only the top five goaltenders, based on save percentage, who have played at least 40% of their team's minutes are included in this list.

Player	MIP	SOG	GA	GAA	SVS%	SO
(Hungary) Yumi Maruyama	120:00	64	3	1.50	95.31	1
(Germany) Johanna May	287:08	102	5	1.04	95.10	2
(Austria) Nina Prunster	240:00	148	9	2.25	93.92	0
(Slovakia) Adriana Stofankova	294:26	94	6	1.22	93.62	1
(France) Anais Aurard	299:37	194	17	3.40	91.24	0

== Division I Group B tournament ==
Division I Group B
Tournament details
- Host country: Poland
- Venue: 1 (in 1 host city)
- Dates: 8–14 January 2017
- Teams: 6

Tournament statistics
- Games played: 15
- Goals scored: 60 (4 per game)
- Attendance: 2,914 (194 per game)
- Scoring leader: Nadia Mattivi

The Division I Group B tournament began on 8 January 2017 in Katowice, Poland with games played at the Katowice Jantor. Following the announcement of the 2017 World Championship program it was revealed that the Division I tournament had been renamed Division I Group A to allow for the creation of a Division I Group B tournament. As a result, Italy, Kazakhstan, Great Britain, China and Poland were all promoted from last years qualification tournament after finishing second through to sixth respectively. Denmark joined as the sixth team at the tournament after finishing last in the 2016 Division I competition.

Italy won the tournament after winning all five of their games, finishing first in the group standings and gained promotion to the 2018 Division I Group A competition. Denmark finished in second placed after losing only to Italy and Poland finished in third place. Kazakhstan finished the tournament in last place after losing all five of their games and was relegated to the Division I Group B Qualification for 2018. Nadia Mattivi of Italy finished as the top scorer of the tournament with eleven points and was named best defenceman by the IIHF directorate. Italy's Eugenia Pomanin led the tournament in goaltending with a save percentage of 98.08. The directorate however named Martyna Sass of Poland as the tournaments best goaltender and named Denmark's Lilli Friis-Hansen as the best forward.

=== Standings ===
Team	Pld	W	OTW	OTL	L	GF	GA	GD	Pts	Promotion or relegation
Italy	5	5	0	0	0	17	3	+14	15	Promoted to 2018 Division I Group A
Denmark	5	4	0	0	1	15	6	+9	12	
Poland	5	2	1	0	2	7	6	+1	8	
Great Britain	5	1	1	0	3	8	13	−5	5	
China	5	1	0	2	2	7	9	−2	5	
Kazakhstan	5	0	0	0	5	6	23	−17	0	Relegated to 2018 Division I Group B Qualification

Source: IIHF

=== Fixtures ===
All times are local. (CET – UTC+01:00)

8 January 2017; 13:00	Great Britain	0 – 3 (0–2, 0–0, 0–1)	Italy	Katowice Jantor; Attendance: 124

Game reference
8 min	Penalties	10 min
14	Shots	23

8 January 2017; 16:30	China	4 – 1 (1–0, 2–1, 1–0)	Kazakhstan	Katowice Jantor; Attendance: 91

Game reference
18 min	Penalties	16 min
30	Shots	17

8 January 2017; 20:00	Poland	0 – 2 (0–1, 0–0, 0–1)	Denmark	Katowice Jantor; Attendance: 512

Game reference
96 min	Penalties	61 min
22	Shots	31

9 January 2017; 13:00	Italy	4 – 2 (2–1, 1–1, 1–0)	China	Katowice Jantor; Attendance: 71

Game reference
12 min	Penalties	22 min
52	Shots	13

9 January 2017; 16:30	Denmark	5 – 1 (2–0, 1–0, 2–1)	Great Britain	Katowice Jantor; Attendance: 80

Game reference
12 min	Penalties	14 min
33	Shots	15

9 January 2017; 20:00	Kazakhstan	2 – 4 (0–2, 1–0, 1–2)	Poland	Katowice Jantor; Attendance: 120

Game reference
22 min	Penalties	10 min
18	Shots	35

11 January 2017; 13:00	Denmark	1 – 0 (0–0, 1–0, 0–0)	China	Katowice Jantor; Attendance: 74

Game reference
6 min	Penalties	14 min
22	Shots	8

11 January 2017; 16:30	Italy	5 – 0 (2–0, 1–0, 2–0)	Kazakhstan	Katowice Jantor; Attendance: 64

Game reference
6 min	Penalties	36 min
51	Shots	19

11 January 2017; 20:00	Poland	2 – 1 (0–1, 1–0, 1–0)	Great Britain	Katowice Jantor; Attendance: 526

Game reference
8 min	Penalties	16 min
19	Shots	22

12 January 2017; 13:00	Kazakhstan	1 – 6 (0–0, 0–2, 1–4)	Denmark	Katowice Jantor; Attendance: 80

Game reference
10 min	Penalties	8 min
4	Shots	45

12 January 2017; 16:30	Great Britain	2 – 1 OT (1–1, 0–0, 0–0, 1–0)	China	Katowice Jantor; Attendance: 102

Game reference
6 min	Penalties	4 min
22	Shots	16

12 January 2017; 20:00	Italy	1 – 0 (1–0, 0–0, 0–0)	Poland	Katowice Jantor; Attendance: 420

Game reference
14 min	Penalties	12 min
14	Shots	19

14 January 2017; 13:00	Kazakhstan	2 – 4 (1–3, 1–0, 0–1)	Great Britain	Katowice Jantor; Attendance: 90

Game reference
12 min	Penalties	6 min
17	Shots	41

14 January 2017; 16:30	Denmark	1 – 4 (1–2, 0–1, 0–1)	Italy	Katowice Jantor; Attendance: 140

Game reference
6 min	Penalties	4 min
19	Shots	19

14 January 2017; 20:00	China	0 – 1 OT (0–0, 0–0, 0–0, 0–1)	Poland	Katowice Jantor; Attendance: 420

Game reference
6 min	Penalties	6 min
25	Shots	34

=== Scoring leaders ===
List shows the top ten skaters sorted by points, then goals.

Player	GP	G	A	Pts	+/-	PIM	POS
(Italy) Nadia Mattivi	5	4	7	11	+9	8	D
(Italy) Anita Muraro	5	6	2	8	+8	0	F
(Denmark) Lilli Friis-Hansen	5	1	6	7	+1	14	F
(United Kingdom) Casey Traill	5	4	2	6	+2	0	F
(Denmark) Maria Holm Peters	5	4	1	5	+1	0	F
(Denmark) Amanda Refsgaard	5	1	4	5	–2	10	D
(China) Zifei Liao	5	3	1	4	+1	8	F
(Italy) Mara de Rech	5	2	2	4	+6	4	F
(United Kingdom) Kathryn Marsden	5	2	2	4	+4	6	F
(Poland) Klaudia Kaleja	5	2	1	3	–1	12	F
(Italy) Greta Niccolai	5	2	1	3	0	0	F

=== Leading goaltenders ===
Only the top five goaltenders, based on save percentage, who have played at least 40% of their team's minutes are included in this list.

Player	MIP	SOG	GA	GAA	SVS%	SO
(Italy) Eugenia Pompanin	180:00	52	1	0.33	98.08	2
(Poland) Martyna Sass	302:06	110	6	1.19	94.55	1
(China) Jiaxin Li	305:50	147	9	1.77	93.88	0
(Italy) Elisa Biondi	120:00	32	2	1.00	93.75	1
(Kazakhstan) Arina Shyokolova	136:36	89	7	3.07	92.13	0

== Division I Group B Qualification tournament ==
Division I Group B Qualification
Tournament details
- Host country: Spain
- Venue: 1 (in 1 host city)
- Dates: 26–29 January 2017
- Teams: 4

Tournament statistics
- Games played: 6
- Goals scored: 46 (7.67 per game)
- Attendance: 933 (156 per game)
- Scoring leader: Natalia Amaya

The Division I Group B Qualification tournament began on 26 January 2017 in San Sebastián, Spain with games played at the Palacio del Hielo Txuri Urdin. Australia and Romania returned to the competition after finishing seventh and eighth respectively in 2016 and missing promotion to Division I Group B. Mexico and Spain both made their debut at the IIHF World Women's U18 Championships.

Australia won the tournament after winning all three of their games, finishing first in the group standings and gained promotion to the 2018 Division I Group B competition. Spain finished in second place after losing only to Australia and Mexico finished in third. Italy's Natalia Amaya finished as the top scorer of the tournament with eight points, which included six goals and two assists. Imogen Perry of Australia led the tournament in goaltending with a save percentage of 100.00 in her 80 minutes of play.

=== Standings ===
Team	Pld	W	OTW	OTL	L	GF	GA	GD	Pts	Promotion
Australia	3	3	0	0	0	18	1	+17	9	Promoted to 2018 Division I Group B
Spain	3	2	0	0	1	13	9	+4	6	
Mexico	3	1	0	0	2	10	9	+1	3	
Romania	3	0	0	0	3	5	27	−22	0	

=== Fixtures ===
All times are local. (CET – UTC+01:00)

26 January 2017; 16:30	Romania	1 – 8 (1–3, 0–3, 0–2)	Mexico	Palacio del Hielo Txuri Urdin; Attendance: 78

Game reference
6 min	Penalties	6 min
11	Shots	44

26 January 2017; 20:00	Spain	1 – 3 (1–1, 0–2, 0–0)	Australia	Palacio del Hielo Txuri Urdin; Attendance: 170

Game reference
12 min	Penalties	2 min
29	Shots	20

28 January 2017; 16:30	Australia	5 – 0 (1–0, 2–0, 2–0)	Mexico	Palacio del Hielo Txuri Urdin; Attendance: 120

Game reference
8 min	Penalties	4 min
37	Shots	16

28 January 2017; 20:00	Romania	4 – 9 (1–2, 0–4, 3–3)	Spain	Palacio del Hielo Txuri Urdin; Attendance: 250

Game reference
8 min	Penalties	10 min
11	Shots	95

29 January 2017; 16:30	Australia	10 – 0 (4–0, 3–0, 3–0)	Romania	Palacio del Hielo Txuri Urdin; Attendance: 85

Game reference
8 min	Penalties	8 min
69	Shots	9

29 January 2017; 20:00	Mexico	2 – 3 (0–1, 2–2, 0–0)	Spain	Palacio del Hielo Txuri Urdin; Attendance: 230

Game reference
12 min	Penalties	16 min
21	Shots	37

=== Scoring leaders ===
List shows the top ten skaters sorted by points, then goals.

Player	GP	G	A	Pts	+/-	PIM	POS
(Mexico) Natalia Amaya	3	6	2	8	+7	0	F
(Mexico) Giovanna Rojas	3	2	5	7	+7	4	F
(Australia) Natalie Ayris	3	2	3	5	+7	2	F
(Australia) Lindsey Kiliwnik	3	2	3	5	+8	0	F
(Spain) Paula Moreno	3	2	3	5	+6	4	F
(Australia) Madison Poole	3	4	0	4	+3	0	F
(Spain) Andrea Merino	3	3	1	4	+5	2	F
(Romania) Katalin Adorjan	3	3	0	3	–9	4	D
(Spain) Elena Sans	3	2	1	3	+4	2	F
(Australia) Emily Davis-Tope	3	1	2	3	+7	0	D
(Spain) Marta del Monte	3	1	2	3	+2	0	F
(Australia) Sara Sammons	3	1	2	3	+3	0	F

=== Leading goaltenders ===
Only the top five goaltenders, based on save percentage, who have played at least 40% of their team's minutes are included in this list.

Player	MIP	SOG	GA	GAA	SVS%	SO
(Australia) Imogen Perry	80:00	19	0	0.00	100.00	1
(Australia) Keesha Atkins	100:00	35	1	0.60	97.14	0
(Mexico) Daniela Castro	151:45	78	8	3.16	89.74	0
(Spain) Laura Lopez de Ochoa	120:00	41	5	2.50	87.80	0
(Romania) Bianca Bobu	112:27	145	21	11.20	85.52	0
