= Jordan Smelker =

American ice hockey player

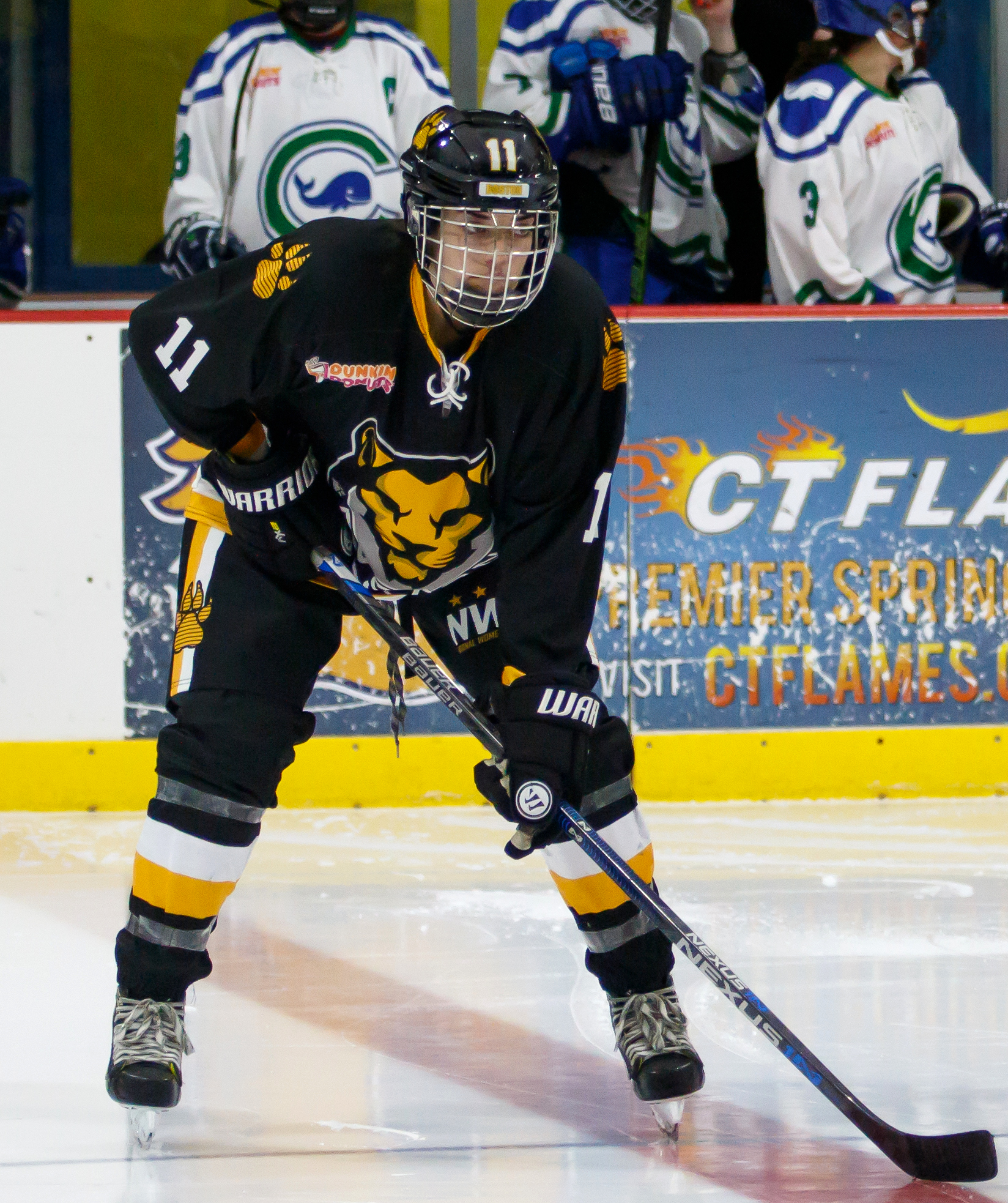
- Jordan Smelker playing for the Boston Pride in 2017
- Born: June 19, 1992 (age 34) Anchorage, Alaska, U.S.
- Height: 5 ft 8 in (173 cm)
- Weight: 165 lb (75 kg; 11 st 11 lb)
- Position: Forward
- Shoots: Left
- NWHL team Former teams: Boston Pride: Boston Blades (CWHL); RPI Engineers (NCAA)
- Playing career: 2014–present

Jordan Smelker (born June 19, 1992) is an American ice hockey forward who played for the Boston Pride in the National Women's Hockey League during the 2015–16 NWHL season. Before joining the Pride, she was a member of the Boston Blades, contributing to their 2015 Clarkson Cup victory and becoming the first player from Alaska to earn the title. The following year, she added an Isobel Cup championship to her résumé with the Pride.

== Career ==
=== NCAA ===
During her NCAA career, Smelker competed for the RPI Engineers women's ice hockey team at Rensselaer Polytechnic Institute. She emerged as the team's top scorer in her sophomore year and, following her senior season, earned a nomination for ECAC Hockey’s Best Defensive Forward Award.

=== CWHL ===
Smelker joined the Boston Blades of the CWHL for the 2014/15 season. In her rookie year, she finished tied for 18th in league scoring alongside Natalie Spooner and Laura Fortino. That season, she also helped the Blades capture the 2015 Clarkson Cup championship.

=== NWHL ===
In 2015, Smelker joined the Boston Pride of the National Women's Hockey League as a free agent, where she played alongside Hilary Knight and Brianna Decker. She helped the team capture the first-ever Isobel Cup championship in 2016.

In 2016, reports indicated that Smelker agreed to a one-year deal worth $14,000 to remain with the Boston Pride for the 2016–17 NWHL season. She renewed her contract with the team in May 2017 for the 2017–18 season.

Smelker tallied both a goal and an assist during the 3rd NWHL All-Star Game.
