= Nina Christof =

German ice hockey player (born 2003)

- Born: 18 August 2003 (age 23) Hammelburg, Germany
- Height: 1.64 m (5 ft 5 in)
- Weight: 66 kg (146 lb; 10 st 6 lb)
- Position: Forward
- Shoots: Left
- SDHL team Former teams: MoDo Hockey; RPI Engineers
- National team: Germany
- Playing career: 2022–present

Nina Christof (born 18 August 2003) is a German ice hockey player who is a forward for MoDo Hockey and the German national team.

== Playing career ==
=== College ===
Christof played four seasons of college ice hockey with the RPI Engineers women's ice hockey team in the ECAC conference of the National Collegiate Athletic Association (NCAA). She appeared in 108 games and tallied 15 goals and 21 assists for 36 points.

=== International ===
Christof made her IIHF U18 Women's World Championship debut with the German national under-18 team at 2018 IIHF U18 Women's World Championship. She had one assist against Sweden as Germany was relegated to Division I A. Christof was a captain for the 2020 IIHF U18 Women's World Championship when Germany was promoted to Top Division, scoring two goals and four assists for six points.

In her debut World Championship match in 2021, she scored two goals against Hungary, wearing the captain patch. Christof was again named a captain to the German squad for the 2022 IIHF Women's World Championship, where she scored a goal against Sweden. She was initially on the 2025 IIHF Women's World Championship roster before she suffered an upper-body injury in a pre-tournament match and was forced to withdraw.

On 15 January 2026, Christof was named to the German national team for the 2026 Winter Olympics in Milan.
