= EC Pfaffenhofen =

EC Pfaffenhofen IceHogs
- City: Pfaffenhofen an der Ilm, Germany
- League: Bayernliga
- Founded: 1970
- Home arena: Eisstadion Pfaffenhofen
- Head coach: Gregor Tomasik

EC Pfaffenhofen, founded 1970, is a German professional ice hockey team based in Pfaffenhofen an der Ilm that plays in the Bayernliga.
