= RPI Engineers women's ice hockey =

- Current season
- University: Rensselaer Polytechnic Institute
- Conference: ECAC
- Head coach: Bryan Vines; 4th season, 23–70–12
- Assistant coaches: Tara Connolly; Jamie Hazelton (volunteer)
- Captain(s): Mikayla Capelle
- Alternate captain(s): Lilli Friis-Hansen; Lauren Severson; Marah Wagner; Delaney Weiss
- Arena: Houston Field House; Troy, New York
- Colors: Cherry and white

The RPI Engineers women's ice hockey team are a National Collegiate Athletic Association (NCAA) Division I women's college ice hockey program that represents Rensselaer Polytechnic Institute (RPI). The Engineers are a member of the ECAC Hockey (ECACHL) conference. They play at the Houston Field House in Troy, New York.

== History ==
The Engineers women's hockey program began for the 1995–96 season, playing at the NCAA Division III level in ECAC East. In their final season in Division III, the 2004–05 season, the Engineers qualified to the championship game of the ECAC East Tournament. It was their second consecutive season in the championship. That season, RPI had 21 wins, compared to only 6 losses and a league record of 17–2–0. In addition, the Engineers were ranked second in the nation in scoring defense (allowing only 1.22 goals per game). Nationally, the Engineers were fourth in power play percentage and eighth in scoring offense. The star of the team was sophomore Julie Aho. She was selected as an AHCA National All-America, and led the team in scoring in each of her first two seasons.

In 2005–06, RPI was a Division I independent. The club won 18 games, lost 6 and tied 2. During that season, the team notched wins over Colgate, Northeastern, Connecticut and Boston University. Despite being an independent, the Engineers were ranked fourth in the NCAA in winning percentage (.731) and seventh in scoring offense (3.23 goals per game average). Senior goaltender Rosina Schiff would become the program's all-time leader in wins with 40 (since broken) and games played with 65 (since broken).

Rensselaer joined the ECAC for the 2006–07 season. In its second season in the ECAC (2007–08), Rensselaer won 13 games, compared to 15 losses and 5 ties and a conference record of 6–12–4. The Engineers matched the single season record for ties, including its first-ever point over then nationally ranked Dartmouth in a 1–1 draw in Hanover.

The record for most wins at the NCAA Division I level in one season is 19, which was set in 2008–09 (19–14–4). The overall program record is 21, set in 2004–05, the team's last year at the Division III level. The Engineers made NCAA history on February 28, 2010, beating Quinnipiac 2–1 in five overtime periods. Senior defenseman Laura Gersten had the game-winning goal. She registered it at 4:32 of the fifth overtime session to not only clinch the win, but the series victory. It is now the second longest college hockey game in NCAA history, surpassed a few weeks later on March 12, 2010, in a men's hockey contest between Quinnipiac beat Union.

During the 2010–11 season, the Engineers boasted one statistic that no other Division I team in the country could: three Alaskan players on its current roster. Amanda Castignetti is from Anchorage (and attended Shattuck St-Mary's in Minnesota), Jordan Smelker, a freshman from Anchorage, and Nona Letuligasenoa (attended the North American Hockey Academy in Stowe, Vermont) were the three players in question.

== Engineers in Pro Hockey ==
As of autumn 2016, there were six Engineers alumnae who had competed in professional women's ice hockey. The list of players includes Whitey Naslund (Class of 2010), Sonja van der Bliek (Class of 2011), Andie LeDonne (Class of 2013), Delaney Middlebrook and Jordan Smelker (Class of 2015) and Alexa Gruschow (Class of 2016).

Naslund would play for the CWHL's Boston Blades under head coach Digit Murphy, capturing a Clarkson Cup championship in 2013. LeDonne and van der Bliek also competed in the CWHL, with van der Bliek taking on goaltender roles with the Brampton Thunder and Toronto Furies. Middlebrook would compete with Riksserien in the Swedish Elite League.

Both Isobel Cup champions, Smelker was a member of the Boston Pride roster that captured the NWHL's inaugural championship in 2016. As a side note, Smelker also won a Clarkson Cup in 2015 with the CWHL's Boston Blades. Winning the NWHL regular season scoring title in 2018, Gruschow was MVP of the Isobel Cup Finals in the same year, hoisting the Cup with the Metropolitan Riveters.

== Year by year ==
Won championship	Lost championship	Conference champions	League leader

After transitioning the program to the Division I level, Burke served as head coach for 11 more seasons before being fired in June, 2017. Bryan Vines was named interim head coach later that month and took the helm beginning with the 2017–18 season.

Year	Coach	Wins	Losses	Ties	Conference	Conf. Wins	Conf. Losses	Conf. Ties	Finish	Conf. Tournament	NCAA Tournament
2025–26	Bryan Vines	7	28	0	ECAC	4	18	0	11th ECAC	Did not qualify	Did not qualify
2024–25	Bryan Vines	14	18	3	ECAC	7	13	2	10th ECAC	Did not qualify	Did not qualify
2023–24	Bryan Vines	13	18	4	ECAC	5	16	1	9th ECAC	Did not qualify	Did not qualify
2022–23	Bryan Vines	9	24	1	ECAC	4	17	1	10th ECAC	Did not qualify	Did not qualify
2021–22	Bryan Vines	9	23	0	ECAC	5	17	0	10th ECAC	Did not qualify	Did not qualify
2020–21	Did not play due to COVID 19										
2019–20	Bryan Vines	0	33	1	ECAC	0	22	0	12th ECAC	Did not qualify	Did not qualify
2018–19	Bryan Vines	14	18	5	ECAC	10	11	1	8th ECAC	Lost Quarterfinals vs. Cornell (1–2 OT, 2–0, 1–6)	Did not qualify
2017–18	Bryan Vines	9	19	6	ECAC	6	13	3	9th ECAC	Did not qualify	Did not qualify
2016–17	John Burke	10	24	2	ECAC	7	14	1	8th ECAC	Lost Quarterfinals vs. Clarkson (1–4, 2–5)	Did not qualify
2015–16	John Burke	10	17	7	ECAC	8	9	5	8th ECAC	Lost Quarterfinals vs. Quinnipiac (2–3 OT, 1–2 2OT)	Did not qualify
2014–15	John Burke	7	23	4	ECAC	5	16	1	9th ECAC	Did not qualify	Did not qualify
2013–14	John Burke	10	20	3	ECAC	6	14	2	10th ECAC	Did not qualify	Did not qualify
2012–13	John Burke	10	22	4	ECAC	8	12	2	7th ECAC	Lost Quarterfinals vs. Clarkson (2–3 OT, 2–5)	Did not qualify
2011–12	John Burke	9	21	4	ECAC	6	14	2	9th ECAC	Did not qualify	Did not qualify
2010–11	John Burke	10	18	7	ECAC	8	12	2	8th ECAC	Lost Quarterfinals vs. Cornell (2–3 OT, 1–6)	Did not qualify
2009–10	John Burke	16	15	6	ECAC	11	7	4	6th ECAC	Won Quarterfinals vs. Quinnipiac (1–2 2OT, 1–0, 2–1 5OT); Lost Semifinals vs. Cornell (4–5)	Did not qualify
2008–09	John Burke	19	14	4	ECAC	11	8	3	6th ECAC	Won Quarterfinals vs. Princeton (2–1 2OT, 1–0); Won Semifinals vs. Harvard (3–2 OT); Lost Championship vs. Dartmouth (1–6)	Did not qualify
2007–08	John Burke	13	15	5	ECAC	6	12	4	9th ECAC	Did not qualify	Did not qualify
2006–07	John Burke	12	22	1	ECAC	8	13	1	8th ECAC	Lost Quarterfinals vs. Dartmouth (3–6, 1–3)	Did not qualify
2005–06	John Burke	18	6	2	Independent						Did not qualify

- Prior to the 2005–06 season, the Engineers were in NCAA Division III.

== Players ==
=== 2022–23 roster ===
As of September 6, 2022.

No.	Nat.	Player	Class	Pos	Height	DoB	Hometown	Previous team
2		Michelle Nutescu	Sophomore	D	5' 7" (1.7 m)	2002-11-19	Northfield, Illinois	Shattuck-Saint Mary's
3		Hannah Price	Senior	D	5' 11" (1.8 m)	2001-02-03	Pittsburgh, Pennsylvania	Pittsburgh Penguins Elite
5		Taylor Zahirnyi	Senior	D	5' 5" (1.65 m)	2000-01-01	Newtown, Pennsylvania	Lawrenceville School
6		Sophia Jones	Freshman	D	5' 3" (1.6 m)	2003-09-22	Westfield, Massachusetts	Williston Northampton School
7		Nyah Philip	Junior	F	5' 4" (1.63 m)	2002-11-18	Mississauga, Ontario	Etobicoke Jr. Dolphins
8		Mika Jahnke	Sophomore	F	5' 2" (1.57 m)	2003-01-01	Allen, Texas	Dallas Stars Elite
9		Magdalena Erbenová	Junior	D	5' 5" (1.65 m)	2000-02-09	Benátky nad Jizerou, Czech Republic	Northwood School
10		Ellie Kaiser	Junior	F	5' 6" (1.68 m)	2002-01-19	Westmont, Illinois	Chicago Mission
11		MJ Alexander	Senior	D	5' 8" (1.73 m)	2000-11-08	Deerfield, Illinois	Chicago Young Americans
12		Audrey McCutcheon	Sophomore	F	5' 4" (1.63 m)	2003-02-22	Saint-Jean-sur-Richelieu, Quebec	Stanstead College
13		Taylor Larsen	Junior	D	5' 8" (1.73 m)	2002-01-01	Bolton, Ontario	Mississauga Jr. Hurricanes
14		Sabrina Beaudoin	Freshman	F	5' 8" (1.73 m)	2001-01-01	Saint-Sauveur, Quebec	John Abbott College
15		Kyley Toye	Freshman	F	5' 8" (1.73 m)	2003-02-05	Brick, New Jersey	Lawrenceville School
16		Meagan Byrum	Junior	F	5' 7" (1.7 m)	2002-08-25	Potomac, Maryland	Washington Pride
17		Nina Christof	Freshman	F	5' 4" (1.63 m)	2003-08-18	Hammelburg, Germany	Bishop Kearney Selects
18		Nyle Boyce	Senior	D	5' 9" (1.75 m)	2001-01-01	Windermere, Florida	Bishop Kearney Selects
19		Asiah Taylor-Walters	Junior	F	5' 4" (1.63 m)	2002-01-01	Toronto, Ontario	Kitchener-Waterloo Jr. Rangers
21		Julia Blitz	Senior	F	5' 8" (1.73 m)	2001-08-14	Potomac, Maryland	Washington Pride
22		Meg Hildner	Sophomore	F	5' 5" (1.65 m)	2002-01-01	Austin, Texas	Dallas Stars Elite
23		Teeghan Dalby	Senior	D	5' 9" (1.75 m)	2001-09-16	Burlington, Ontario	Stoney Creek Jr. Sabres
25		Sarah Bukvic	Senior	F	5' 5" (1.65 m)	2001-07-25	Burlington, Ontario	Stoney Creek Jr. Sabres
28		Maddy Papineau	Junior	F	5' 7" (1.7 m)	2002-03-29	Sudbury, Ontario	Oakville Jr. Hornets
29		Marah Wagner (A)	Senior	F	5' 4" (1.63 m)	2000-10-19	Langley, British Columbia	Robert Morris
31		Amanda Rampado	Senior	G	5' 5" (1.65 m)	2001-11-27	Stoney Creek, Ontario	Stoney Creek Jr. Sabres
33		Riena Jahnke	Junior	F	5' 3" (1.6 m)	2001-08-05	Allen, Texas	Seibu Princess Rabbits
34		Jaden Mirek	Junior	G	6' 0" (1.83 m)	2002-05-12	Grafton, Wisconsin	Milwaukee Jr. Admirals
35		Émilie Venne	Junior	G	5' 5" (1.65 m)	2002-01-01	Greely, Ontario	Northwood School
36		Sara Bayne	Junior	F	5' 6" (1.68 m)	2002-04-23	Logan, Utah	HoneyBaked
39		Maddy Peterson	Senior	F	5' 3" (1.6 m)	2001-06-28	Princeton, Minnesota	Princeton High School

=== Notable players ===
- Ena Nystrøm (G), 2019–2020
- Lovisa Selander (G), 2015–2019
- Jordan Smelker (F), 2010–2014
- Sonja van der Bliek (G), 2007–2011
- Alison Wright (F), 2006–2010

As of the end of the 2009–10 season, Sonja van der Bliek was RPI's single season record holder in numerous categories: most games played (84), most games started (83), most wins (42–31–11), most minutes played (5161:36), most saves (1922) and most shutouts (16). In the 2017–18 season, junior goaltender Lovisa Selander overtook van der Bliek as the all-time leader in career saves. She enters her senior season in 2018–19 with 2,935 career stops.

== Awards and honors ==
- Julie Aho, AHCA National All-America (2005)
- Laura Gersten, Sarah Devens Award
- Alisa Harrison, ECAC Hockey All-Rookie Team (2009)
- Whitney Naslund, ECAC Hockey Championship All-Tournament Team (2009)
- Sierra Vadner, Defense, 2009 ECAC All-Rookie Team
- Sonja van der Bliek was named the ECAC Goaltender of the Week (for the week of March 1, 2010)
- Sarah Daniel, 2 time Academic All American and two-time captain, 2006, 2007
- Lovisa Selander, ECAC Rookie of the Year & Goalie of the Year Finalist, ECAC Third Team All-Conference, ECAC All-Rookie Team (2015–16), All-ECAC Hockey Preseason Team (2016–17), ECAC Hockey Second Team All-Conference (2017–18), ECAC Hockey Pre-Season Team, ECAC Goaltender of the Year, ECAC First Team All-Conference, CCM Hockey/AHCA Division I First Team All-America, Top-10 Patty Kazmaier Award Nominee, NCAA All-Time Division I Women's Hockey career saves record holder (4,167) (2018–19).

== Olympians ==
This is a list of Rensselaer alumnae who were a part of an Olympic team.

Name	Position	Rensselaer Tenure	Team	Year	Finish
Lilli Friis-Hansen	Forward	2018–2022	(Denmark) DEN	2022	10th
Nina Christof	Forward	2022–2026	(Germany) GER	2026	7th

== Engineers in professional hockey ==
= CWHL All-Star	= NWHL All-Star	= Clarkson Cup Champion	= Isobel Cup Champion

Player	Position	Team(s)	League(s)	Years	Clarkson Cup	Isobel Cup
Whitney Naslund	Forward	Boston Blades	CWHL	3	2013 Clarkson Cup	
Lovisa Selander	Goaltender	Boston Pride	NWHL			1 (2021)
Jordan Smelker		Boston Blades; Boston Pride	CWHL; NWHL		1 (2015)	1 (2016)
Sonja van der Bliek	Goaltender	Brampton Thunder; Toronto Furies	CWHL			

== See also ==
- RPI Engineers men's ice hockey
