= 2016 IIHF U18 Women's World Championship Division I =

2016 IIHF World Women's U18 Championship Division I

Tournament details
- Host countries: Hungary; Austria
- Venues: 3 (in 3 host cities)
- Dates: 7–11 January 2016; 10–16 January 2016
- Teams: 14

Tournament statistics
- Scoring leader(s): (Germany) Emily Nix (Norway) Millie Sirum (8 points)

The 2016 IIHF U18 Women's World Championship Division I and 2016 IIHF U18 Women's World Championship Division I Qualification were a pair of international under-18 women's ice hockey tournaments run by the International Ice Hockey Federation. The Division I and Division I Qualification tournaments made up the second and third level of competition at the 2016 IIHF World Women's U18 Championships respectively. The Division I tournament took place between 10 January and 16 January 2016 in Miskolc, Hungary. The tournament was won by Japan who gained promotion back to the Championship Division for 2017 while Denmark finished last and was placed in the newly formed Division I Group B tournament for 2017. The Division I Qualification tournament took place from 7 January to 11 January 2016 in Spittal an der Drau and Radenthein, Austria. Austria won the tournament defeating Italy in the final and gained promotion to Division I Group A for 2017. Italy, Kazakhstan, Great Britain, China and Poland were promoted to Division I Group B after finishing second through to sixth in the Division I Qualification tournament.

== Division I tournament ==
The Division I tournament began on 10 January 2016 in Miskolc, Hungary at the Miskolc Arena. Germany, Hungary, Norway and Slovakia returned to compete in the Division I competition after missing promotion to the Championship Division at the previous years World Championships. Denmark gained promotion to the 2016 Division I tournament after finishing first in last years Division I Qualification and Japan was relegated from the Championship Division after failing to survive the relegation round at the 2015 IIHF World Women's U18 Championship.

Japan won the tournament after winning all five of their games, finishing first in the group standings and gained promotion back to the Championship Division for the 2017 IIHF World Women's U18 Championships. Germany finished in second place after losing only to Japan and Slovakia finished in third place. Denmark finished the tournament in last place after losing all five of their games and was relegated back to Division I Qualification for 2017. Ayu Tonosaki of Japan led the tournament in goaltending with a save percentage of 96.55 and was named the top goaltender by the IIHF directorate. Germany's Emily Nix and Norway's Millie Sirum finished as the top scorers of the tournament with eight points each which included two goals and six assists. Nix was also named as the tournaments best forward and Tatiana Ištocyová of Slovakia was named best defenceman.

Following the announcement of the 2017 World Championship program the IIHF revealed that the Division I tournament had been renamed to Division I Group A to allow for the creation of a Division I Group B tournament. As a result, Denmark was placed in the Group B tournament for 2017 instead of the Qualification tournament.

=== Standings ===
Team	Pld	W	OTW	OTL	L	GF	GA	GD	Pts	Promotion or relegation
Japan	5	5	0	0	0	18	2	+16	15	Promoted to the 2017 Top Division
Germany	5	3	1	0	1	19	8	+11	11	
Slovakia	5	3	0	1	1	18	9	+9	10	
Norway	5	2	0	0	3	14	12	+2	6	
Hungary	5	1	0	0	4	4	24	−20	3	
Denmark	5	0	0	0	5	2	20	−18	0	Relegated to 2017 Division I Group B

Source: IIHF

=== Fixtures ===
All times are local. (CET – UTC+1)

10 January 2016; 12:30	Denmark	0 – 3 (0–0, 0–1, 0–2)	Japan	Miskolc Arena; Attendance: 55

Game reference

10 January 2016; 16:00	Germany	5 – 1 (0–1, 4–0, 1–0)	Norway	Miskolc Arena; Attendance: 110

Game reference

10 January 2016; 19:30	Hungary	0 – 5 (0–3, 0–0, 0–2)	Slovakia	Miskolc Arena; Attendance: 350

Game reference

11 January 2016; 12:30	Japan	3 – 1 (0–1, 1–0, 2–0)	Germany	Miskolc Arena; Attendance: 45

Game reference

11 January 2016; 16:00	Slovakia	5 – 0 (1–0, 4–0, 0–0)	Denmark	Miskolc Arena; Attendance: 40

Game reference

11 January 2016; 19:30	Norway	5 – 0 (1–0, 1–0, 3–0)	Hungary	Miskolc Arena; Attendance: 150

Game reference

13 January 2016; 12:30	Norway	2 – 5 (1–0, 0–2, 1–3)	Slovakia	Miskolc Arena; Attendance: 85

Game reference

13 January 2016; 16:00	Denmark	1 – 3 (0–0, 0–1, 1–2)	Germany	Miskolc Arena; Attendance: 65

Game reference

13 January 2016; 19:30	Japan	7 – 0 (2–0, 4–0, 1–0)	Hungary	Miskolc Arena; Attendance: 120

Game reference

14 January 2016; 12:30	Norway	6 – 1 (2–0, 3–0, 1–1)	Denmark	Miskolc Arena; Attendance: 55

Game reference

14 January 2016; 16:00	Slovakia	1 – 4 (0–2, 1–0, 0–2)	Japan	Miskolc Arena; Attendance: 90

Game reference

14 January 2016; 19:30	Germany	7 – 1 (2–0, 4–0, 1–1)	Hungary	Miskolc Arena; Attendance: 100

Game reference

16 January 2016; 12:30	Slovakia	2 – 3 OT (1–0, 1–1, 0–1, 0–1)	Germany	Miskolc Arena; Attendance: 95

Game reference

16 January 2016; 16:00	Japan	1 – 0 (1–0, 0–0, 0–0)	Norway	Miskolc Arena; Attendance: 50

Game reference

16 January 2016; 19:30	Hungary	3 – 0 (2–0, 1–0, 0–0)	Denmark	Miskolc Arena; Attendance: 250

Game reference

=== Scoring leaders ===
List shows the top ten skaters sorted by points, then goals.

Player	GP	G	A	Pts	+/-	PIM	POS
(Germany) Emily Nix	5	2	6	8	+8	2	F
(Norway) Millie Sirum	5	2	6	8	+3	12	F
(Slovakia) Viktória Maskaľová	5	6	1	7	+4	2	F
(Norway) Josefine Biseth Engmann	5	5	2	7	+3	4	F
(Slovakia) Tatiana Ištocyová	5	1	5	6	+6	4	D
(Germany) Larissa Eicher	5	4	1	5	–4	2	F
(Japan) Ran Hinata	5	3	2	5	+4	0	F
(Slovakia) Romana Košecká	5	3	2	5	+1	4	F
(Slovakia) Annamária Suráková	5	2	3	5	+1	8	F
(Germany) Kelsey Soccio	5	4	0	4	+4	2	F

=== Leading goaltenders ===
Only the top five goaltenders, based on save percentage, who have played at least 40% of their team's minutes are included in this list.

Player	MIP	SOG	GA	GAA	SVS%	SO
(Japan) Ayu Tonosaki	274:26	58	2	0.44	96.55	1
(Norway) Ena Nystrom	277:18	142	10	2.16	92.96	1
(Denmark) Cassandra Repstock-Romme	120:40	85	6	2.98	92.94	0
(Germany) Johanna May	260:52	80	6	1.38	92.50	0
(Slovakia) Adriana Stofankova	272:32	99	9	1.98	90.91	1

== Division I Qualification tournament ==
The Division I Qualification tournament began on 7 January 2016 in Spittal an der Drau and Radenthein, Austria at the Eis Sport Arena and Nockhalle respectively. China, Great Britain, Italy, Kazakhstan and Poland returned to compete in the Division I Qualification competition after missing promotion to Division I at the previous years World Championships. Australia and Romania made their debut in the competition and Austria entered the tournament after being relegated from Division I at the 2015 IIHF World Women's U18 Championship.

The teams were divided into two groups of four for the preliminary round. Group A was won by Austria and Group B by Italy with both teams advancing to the gold medal game. Kazakhstan and Great Britain both advanced to the bronze medal game after finishing second in their groups. China and Poland made up the fifth place classification match after finishing third in the preliminary round and Australia and Romania were drawn against each other for the seventh place classification match. Austria defeated Italy 3–2 in the gold medal game to win the tournament and gain promotion back to Division I for the 2017 IIHF World Women's U18 Championships. Kazakhstan finished third after beating Great Britain 2–0 in the bronze medal game. Following the end of the tournament the IIHF directorate named China's Siye He best goaltender of the tournament, Italy's Nadia Mattivi best defenceman and Theresa Schafzahl of Austria best forward. Italy's Eugenia Pompanin led the tournament in goaltending with a save percentage of 93.81 and Malika Aldabergenova of Kazakhstan finished as the top scorer with twelve points which included five goals and seven assists.

Following the announcement of the 2017 World Championship program the IIHF revealed that the Division I tournament had been renamed to Division I Group A to allow for the creation of a Division I Group B tournament. As a result, Austria was promoted to the Division I Group A tournament while Italy, Kazakhstan, Great Britain, China and Poland were promoted to the Division I Group B tournament.

=== Preliminary round ===
==== Group A ====
Team	Pld	W	OTW	OTL	L	GF	GA	GD	Pts
Austria	3	3	0	0	0	20	1	+19	9
Kazakhstan	3	2	0	0	1	20	7	+13	6
China	3	1	0	0	2	12	11	+1	3
Romania	3	0	0	0	3	3	36	−33	0

Source: IIHF

All times are local. (CET – UTC+1)

7 January 2016; 12:00	Kazakhstan	5 – 2 (2–1, 0–1, 3–0)	China	Eis Sport Arena

Game reference

7 January 2016; 15:30	Austria	12 – 0 (3–0, 5–0, 4–0)	Romania	Eis Sport Arena

Game reference

8 January 2016; 12:00	Kazakhstan	15 – 0 (5–0, 3–0, 7–0)	Romania	Eis Sport Arena; Attendance: 150

Game reference

8 January 2016; 15:30	China	1 – 3 (0–1, 1–1, 0–1)	Austria	Eis Sport Arena; Attendance: 590

Game reference

10 January 2016; 12:00	Romania	3 – 9 (0–0, 1–6, 2–3)	China	Eis Sport Arena; Attendance: 110

Game reference

10 January 2016; 15:30	Austria	5 – 0 (3–0, 0–0, 2–0)	Kazakhstan	Eis Sport Arena; Attendance: 625

Game reference

==== Group B ====
Team	Pld	W	OTW	OTL	L	GF	GA	GD	Pts
Italy	3	3	0	0	0	15	3	+12	9
Great Britain	3	2	0	0	1	7	6	+1	6
Poland	3	1	0	0	2	14	7	+7	3
Australia	3	0	0	0	3	2	22	−20	0

Source: IIHF

All times are local. (CET – UTC+1)

7 January 2016; 11:45	Poland	11 – 0 (6–0, 2–0, 3–0)	Australia	Nockhalle; Attendance: 110

Game reference

7 January 2016; 15:15	Italy	3 – 1 (0–0, 2–1, 1–0)	Great Britain	Nockhalle; Attendance: 110

Game reference

8 January 2016; 11:45	Poland	1 – 3 (0–2, 0–1, 1–0)	Great Britain	Nockhalle; Attendance: 120

Game reference

8 January 2016; 15:15	Australia	0 – 8 (0–2, 0–3, 0–3)	Italy	Nockhalle

Game reference

10 January 2016; 11:45	Great Britain	3 – 2 (1–0, 0–0, 2–2)	Australia	Nockhalle; Attendance: 120

Game reference

10 January 2016; 15:15	Italy	4 – 2 (0–0, 2–0, 2–2)	Poland	Nockhalle; Attendance: 250

Game reference

=== Playoff round ===
==== Seventh place game ====
11 January 2016; 11:45	Romania	6 – 7 SO (3–1, 2–2, 1–3, 0–0, 0–1)	Australia	Nockhalle; Attendance: 130

Game reference

==== Fifth place game ====
11 January 2016; 15:15	China	5 – 2 (1–0, 4–0, 0–2)	Poland	Nockhalle

Game reference

==== Third place game ====
11 January 2016; 12:00	Kazakhstan	2 – 0 (1–0, 1–0, 0–0)	Great Britain	Eis Sport Arena; Attendance: 300

Game reference

==== Final ====
11 January 2016; 15:30	Austria	3 – 2 (1–2, 1–0, 1–0)	Italy	Eis Sport Arena; Attendance: 736

Game reference

=== Ranking and statistics ===
==== Scoring leaders ====
List shows the top ten skaters sorted by points, then goals.

Player	GP	G	A	Pts	+/-	PIM	POS
(Kazakhstan) Malika Aldabergenova	4	5	7	12	+13	12	F
(Kazakhstan) Anastassiya Petsevich	4	7	3	10	+13	4	F
(Italy) Anita Muraro	4	7	1	8	+6	2	F
(Austria) Theresa Schafzahl	4	3	5	8	+11	4	F
(China) Rui Zhu	4	5	2	7	+4	2	F
(Romania) Voicu Ana	4	3	4	7	–17	14	F
(Kazakhstan) Alexandra Feklistova	4	5	1	6	+14	4	D
(China) Naiyuan Tian	4	5	1	6	+2	10	F
(Austria) Sophie Engelhart	4	4	2	6	+9	0	F
(Austria) Jennifer Pesendorfer	4	3	3	6	+10	0	F

==== Leading goaltenders ====
Only the top five goaltenders, based on save percentage, who have played at least 40% of their team's minutes are included in this list.

Player	MIP	SOG	GA	GAA	SVS%	SO
(Italy) Eugenia Pompanin	180:00	97	6	2.00	93.81	0
(United Kingdom) Isobel Wallace	180:00	74	5	1.67	93.24	0
(Austria) Jessica Ekrt	180:00	24	2	0.67	91.67	2
(Kazakhstan) Alexandra Poliyenko	180:00	83	7	2.33	91.57	1
(China) Siye He	234:45	147	13	3.32	91.16	0
