= 2010 IIHF World Women's U18 Championship Division I =

2010 IIHF U18 Women's World Championship Division I

Tournament details
- Host country: Slovakia
- City: Piešťany
- Venue: 1 (in 1 host city)
- Dates: 3–9 April 2010
- Teams: 6

Tournament statistics
- Games played: 15
- Goals scored: 116 (7.73 per game)
- Attendance: 3,308 (221 per game)
- Scoring leader: (Switzerland) Sara Benz (18 points)

The 2010 IIHF U18 Women's World Championship Division I tournament was the second Division I tournament of the U18 Women's World Championship in ice hockey. Division I was played as a single tournament of six teams and it represented the second tier of competition at the 2010 IIHF U18 Women's World Championship.

The Division I tournament was played at the Piešťany Ice Rink (Slovak: Zimný štadión Piešťany) in Piešťany, Slovakia during 3 to 9 April 2010. Switzerland was the tournament champion and earned promotion to the Top Division of the 2011 IIHF U18 Women's World Championship.

== Teams ==
Team	Previous result
Switzerland	8th place in 2009 World Championship Top Division and were relegated
France	2nd place in 2009 World Championship Division I
Slovakia	Host; 3rd place in 2009 World Championship Division I
Austria	4th place in 2009 World Championship Division I
Norway	5th place in 2009 World Championship Division I
Kazakhstan	World Championship debut

== Standings ==
Pos	Team	Pld	W	OTW	OTL	L	GF	GA	GD	Pts
1	Switzerland	5	5	0	0	0	44	5	+39	15
2	France	5	4	0	0	1	16	15	+1	12
3	Slovakia	5	3	0	0	2	17	9	+8	9
4	Austria	5	2	0	0	3	16	14	+2	6
5	Norway	5	1	0	0	4	14	27	−13	3
6	Kazakhstan	5	0	0	0	5	9	46	−37	0

Source: IIHF

Switzerland was promoted to the Top Division of the 2011 IIHF U18 Women's World Championship

== Results ==
All times are local (Central European Time – UTC+1).
Note: PP1 = Power play goal (+1 advantage); PP2 = Power play goal (+2 advantage); SH1 = Short handed goal (–1 advantage); EN = Empty net goal; EA = Extra attacker; PS = Penalty shot

3 April 2010; 12:00	Kazakhstan	1–15 (0–6, 1–3, 0–6)	Switzerland	Piešťany Ice Rink, Piešťany; Attendance: 57

Alexandra Kalmukanova
Anasstasiya Ogay
Goalies
Larissa Friant
Referee:
(Netherlands) Debby Hengst
Linesmen:
(Slovakia) Magdaléna Čerhitová
(Hungary) Zsuzsanna Sándor

	0–1	01:22 – Stänz (Hofstetter)
	0–2	02:32 – L. Benz (Zollinger, Stalder)
	0–3	04:04 – I. Waidacher (Stänz)
	0–4	05:27 – N. Waidacher (S. Benz, Raselli)
	0–5	06:01 – S. Benz (N. Waidacher, Raselli)
	0–6	13:33 – Stänz (McGregor, I. Waidacher)
	0–7	20:45 – Raselli (S. Benz, N. Waidacher)
	0–8	31:13 – Raselli (S. Benz, N. Waidacher)
Azanova (Orlova) – 34:48	1–8
	1–9	38:26 – S. Benz (N. Waidacher)
	1–10	43:24 – S. Benz (Raselli)
	1–11	44:03 – McGregor (Stänz, I. Waidacher)
	1–12	45:32 – Raselli (L. Benz)
	1–13	48:25 – L. Benz (Raselli)
	1–14	49:00 – Forster
	1–15	58:14 – L. Benz (Stalder, S. Benz)

8 min
Penalties
8 min
6
Shots
81

3 April 2010; 15:30	Austria	1–4 (0–1, 1–0, 0–3)	France	Piešťany Ice Rink, Piešťany; Attendance: 80

Paula Marchhart
Goalies
Caroline Baldin
Referee:
(Russia) Arina Ustinova
Linesmen:
(Estonia) Kaire Leet
(Germany) Diana Pencun

	0–1	18:46 – Lahouratate Passard
Ullrich (Hummel) – 35:13	1–1
	1–2	40:26 – Jouanny (Lahouratate Passard) (PP1)
	1–3	43:08 – Pierrot (Rihet)
	1–4	59:21 – Rihet (EN)

16 min
Penalties
14 min
45
Shots
24

3 April 2010; 19:00	Norway	1–5 (0–0, 0–3, 1–2)	Slovakia	Piešťany Ice Rink, Piešťany; Attendance: 235

Christine Berger
Goalies
Jana Budajová
Referee:
(Sweden) Malin Axelsson
Linesmen:
(Russia) Elena Ivanova
(Netherlands) Bianca Schipper

	0–1	24:31 – Lučová (Čupková)
	0–2	27:03 – Ihnaťová
	0–3	39:46 – Lučová (Čupková, Michalcová)
Dalen (Henriksen) (PP1) – 45:34	1–3
	1–4	52:04 – Staroňová (Ihnaťová)
	1–5	53:34 – Staroňová

4 min
Penalties
8 min
29
Shots
31

4 April 2010; 12:00	Switzerland	5–2 (2–1, 1–1, 2–0)	Austria	Piešťany Ice Rink, Piešťany; Attendance: 286

Larissa Friant
Goalies
Paula Marchhart
Referee:
(Russia) Arina Ustinova
Linesmen:
(Slovakia) Magdaléna Čerhitová
(Russia) Elena Ivanova

I. Waidacher (Stänz) – 05:30	1–0
Raselli (PP1) – 08:40	2–0
	2–1	18:26 – Hummel (SH1)
	2–2	28:13 – Meixner (Ullrich) (PP1)
Zollinger (SH1) – 33:04	3–2
I. Waidacher (Forster, Altmann) – 41:12	4–2
Teggi (Zollinger) – 59:07	5–2

14 min
Penalties
16 min
62
Shots
18

4 April 2010; 15:30	France	4–2 (1–1, 0–1, 3–0)	Norway	Piešťany Ice Rink, Piešťany; Attendance: 310

Caroline Baldin
Goalies
Christine Berger
Referee:
(Czech Republic) Ludmila Nelibová
Linesmen:
(Netherlands) Bianca Schipper
(Slovakia) Viera Šilhavíková

Lahouratate Passard (Escudero) – 02:23	1–0
	1–1	06:31 – Hansen (Dalen)
	1–2	23:29 – Dalen
Jouanny (Fohrer) (PP1) – 47:34	2–2
Escudero – 59:22	3–2
Jouanny (EN) – 59:39	4–2

8 min
Penalties
10 min
31
Shots
34

4 April 2010; 19:00	Slovakia	9–2 (5–1, 3–0, 1–1)	Kazakhstan	Piešťany Ice Rink, Piešťany; Attendance: 375

Romana Kiapešová
Goalies
Anastassiya Ogay
Referee:
(Netherlands) Debby Hengst
Linesmen:
(Germany) Diana Pencun
(Hungary) Zsuzsanna Sándor

Čupková (Bondorová) – 03:07	1–0
Miháliková (Ihnaťová) (PP1) – 06:36	2–0
Čupková (Lúčová, Bondorová) – 09:47	3–0
Staroňová (Miháliková) – 10:08	4–0
Ihnaťová (Balášová, Michalcová) – 12:20	5–0
	5–1	17:20 – Kartanbayeva (Ryspek)
Miháliková (Staroňová, Ihnaťová) (PP1) – 27:40	6–1
Čupková (Lúčová, Novotná) (PP2) – 30:36	7–1
Čupková – 36:32	8–1
	8–2	51:37 – Kartanbayeva (Assimova, Khamimuldinova)
Čupková (PP1) – 56:26	9–2

10 min
Penalties
24 min
47
Shots
14

6 April 2010; 12:00	Switzerland	12–1 (3–1, 3–0, 6–0)	Norway	Piešťany Ice Rink, Piešťany; Attendance: 80

Larissa Friant
Sarah Kung
Goalies
Ingrid Sandven
Referee:
(Sweden) Malin Axelsson
Linesmen:
(Slovakia) Magdaléna Čerhitová
(Hungary) Zsuzsanna Sándor

	0–1	03:44 – Dalen (Henriksen) (SH1)
Stalder – 09:47	1–1
N. Waidacher (S. Benz) (PP1) – 11:21	2–1
S. Benz (N. Waidacher) – 18:32	3–1
Zollinger (Schneider) – 26:49	4–1
S. Benz (SH1) – 28:52	5–1
I. Waidacher (Stalder, Stänz) (PP1) – 30:36	6–1
S. Benz (Stalder) – 43:08	7–1
Stänz (I. Waidacher) – 43:35	8–1
S. Benz (N. Waidacher, Forster) – 45:43	9–1
S. Benz (N. Waidacher, Raselli) – 49:14	10–1
N. Waidacher – 50:55	11–1
N. Waidacher – 59:54	12–1

6 min
Penalties
22 min
39
Shots
12

6 April 2010; 15:30	Kazakhstan	3–9 (0–1, 1–3, 2–5)	Austria	Piešťany Ice Rink, Piešťany; Attendance: 290

Anastassiya Ogay
Alexandra Kalmukanova
Goalies
Nicole Arnberger
Referee:
(Czech Republic) Ludmila Nelibová
Linesmen:
(Germany) Diana Pencun
(Slovakia) Viera Šilhavíková

	0–1	03:05 – Meixner (Bacher) (SH1)
	0–2	21:01 – Bacher (Meixner)
Ryspek (Kartanbayeva) – 23:35	1–2
	1–3	27:58 – Willenshofer (Arneitz, Kainberger)
	1–4	35:28 – Ullrich (Arnberger) (SH1)
	1–5	43:11 – Meixner (Bacher)
Karpeyeva (Orlova) – 46:17	2–5
	2–6	Grascher (Willenshofer)
Kartanbayeva – 51:31	3–6
	3–7	51:54 – Ullrich (Meixner, Kneß)
	3–8	56:32 – Ullrich (Meixner)
	3–9	58:22 – Meixner

12 min
Penalties
12 min
22
Shots
37

6 April 2010; 19:00	France	3–2 (0–0, 1–1, 2–1)	Slovakia	Piešťany Ice Rink, Piešťany; Attendance: 360

Caroline Baldin
Goalies
Jana Budajová
Referee:
(Russia) Arina Ustinova
Linesmen:
(Russia) Elena Ivanova
(Estonia) Kaire Leet

Lahouratate Passard – 23:48	1–0
	1–1	27:05 – Čupková (Lúčová)
	1–2	43:58 – Čupková (PP1)
Fohrer (Lahouratate Passard, Jouanny) (PP1) – 50:25	2–2
Jouanny (Houle) (SH1) – 58:52	3–2

10 min
Penalties
16 min
29
Shots
26

7 April 2010; 12:00	France	4–1 (1–1, 2–0, 1–0)	Kazakhstan	Piešťany Ice Rink, Piešťany; Attendance: 280

Caroline Baldin
Goalies
Alexandra Kalmukanova
Referee:
(Sweden) Malin Axelsson
Linesmen:
(Hungary) Zsuzsanna Sándor
(Slovakia) Viera Šilhavíková

	0–1	04:53 – Khamimuldinova
Escudero – 09:14	1–1
Lahouratate Passard (Jouanny) (PP1) – 20:14	2–1
Lahouratate Passard (Jouanny) (PP1) – 27:50	3–1
Jouanny (Fohrer) (PP1) – 48:48	4–1

12 min
Penalties
14 min
38
Shots
27

7 April 2010; 15:30	Austria	4–1 (3–0, 1–1, 0–0)	Norway	Piešťany Ice Rink, Piešťany; Attendance: 320

Paula Marchhart
Goalies
Christine Berger
Referee:
(Czech Republic) Ludmila Nelibová
Linesmen:
(Slovakia) Magdaléna Čerhitová
(Russia) Elena Ivanova

Lopez (Willenshofer) – 04:47	1–0
Bacher (Ullrich, Hummel) (PP1) – 07:00	2–0
Meixner (Bacher) – 18:13	3–0
	3–1	24:28 – Løvdal (Hansen)
Willenshofer (Hummel) – 36:41	4–1

33 min
Penalties
12 min
36
Shots
29

7 April 2010; 19:00	Slovakia	0–3 (0–0, 0–1, 0–2)	Switzerland	Piešťany Ice Rink, Piešťany; Attendance: 380

Jana Budajová
Goalies
Sarah Kung
Referee:
(Netherlands) Debby Hengst
Linesmen:
(Germany) Diana Pencun
(Netherlands) Bianca Schipper

0–1	22:18 – Stalder (I. Waidacher)
0–2	42:22 – N. Waidacher (PS)
0–3	49:11 – Stänz (I. Waidacher) (PP1)

10 min
Penalties
14 min
10
Shots
58

9 April 2010; 12:00	Switzerland	9–1 (4–0, 1–0, 4–1)	France	Piešťany Ice Rink, Piešťany; Attendance: 260

Sarah Kung
Larissa Friant
Goalies
Caroline Baldin
Nathalie Bore
Referee:
(Netherlands) Debby Hengst
Linesmen:
(Germany) Diana Pencun
(Netherlands) Bianca Schipper

Stalder (S. Benz, N. Waidacher) – 05:53	1–0
Stänz – 06:34	2–0
I. Waidacher (Zollinger, Forster) (PP1) – 10:59	3–0
S. Benz (SH1) – 18:48	4–0
N. Waidacher (Stalder) – 25:53	5–0
L. Benz (Raselli, S. Benz) (PP1) – 40:26	6–0
Stalder (L. Benz, S. Benz) (PP2) – 47:01	7–0
L. Benz (S. Benz, Raselli) (PP1) – 48:12	8–0
	8–1	48:53 – Fohrer (Cleret)
I. Waidacher (Altmann, McGregor) – 49:49	9–1

26 min
Penalties
22 min
53
Shots
16

9 April 2010; 15:30	Norway	9–2 (3–0, 3–2, 3–0)	Kazakhstan	Piešťany Ice Rink, Piešťany; Attendance: 315

Christine Berger
Goalies
Alexandra Kalmukanova
Anastassiya Ogay
Referee:
(Russia) Arina Ustinova
Linesmen:
(Slovakia) Magdaléna Čerhitová
(Slovakia) Viera Šilhavíková

Hansen (SH1) – 06:06	1–0
Dalen (Hansen, Otnes) (SH1) – 11:17	2–0
Græsdal (Gjerde) – 14:44	3–0
Græsdal (Dalen, Holøs) (PP1) – 25:38	4–0
	4–1	28:28 – Ryspek (Orlova)
Dalen – 31:18	5–1
Græsdal (Dalen) – 32:25	6–1
	6–2	33:48 – Moldabay (PP1)
Dalen (PP2) – 44:38	7–2
Dalen (Hansen) (PP1) – 45:38	8–2
Dalen – 56:40	9–2

16 min
Penalties
20 min
46
Shots
15

9 April 2010; 19:00	Slovakia	1–0 (0–0, 0–0, 1–0)	Austria	Piešťany Ice Rink, Piešťany; Attendance: 410

Jana Budajová	Goalies	Paula Marchhart	Referee: (Sweden) Malin Axelsson; Linesmen: (Estonia) Kaire Leet (Hungary) Zsuzsanna Sándor
Olosová (Novotná, Lúčová) (PP2) – 47:32 / 1–0			Referee: (Sweden) Malin Axelsson; Linesmen: (Estonia) Kaire Leet (Hungary) Zsuzsanna Sándor
12 min	Penalties	20 min	Referee: (Sweden) Malin Axelsson; Linesmen: (Estonia) Kaire Leet (Hungary) Zsuzsanna Sándor
27	Shots	37	Referee: (Sweden) Malin Axelsson; Linesmen: (Estonia) Kaire Leet (Hungary) Zsuzsanna Sándor

== Awards and statistics ==
=== Awards ===
Best players selected by the Directorate

Position	Player
Goaltender	(Slovakia) Jana Budajová
Defender	(Switzerland) Lara Stalder
Forward	(Switzerland) Sara Benz
MVP	(Slovakia) Nicol Čupková

=== Scoring leaders ===
List shows the top skaters sorted by points, then goals.

Rank		Player	GP	G	A	Pts	+/−	PIM	POS
1	(Switzerland)	Sara Benz	5	9	9	18	+17	8	F
2	(Switzerland)	Nina Waidacher	5	6	7	13	+16	2	F
3	(Switzerland)	Isabel Waidacher	5	6	6	12	+9	0	F
4	(Norway)	Andrea Dalen	5	8	3	11	+4	6	F
5	(Switzerland)	Evelina Raselli	5	4	7	11	+6	20	F
6	(Slovakia)	Nicol Čupková	5	7	2	9	+2	6	F
7	(Switzerland)	Phoebe Stänz	5	5	4	9	+9	0	F
8	(Switzerland)	Lara Stalder	5	4	5	9	+18	2	D
9	(France)	Betty Jouanny	5	5	3	8	+4	2	F
9	(Austria)	Anna Meixner	5	5	3	8	+1	10	F

GP = Games played; G = Goals; A = Assists; Pts = Points; +/− = Plus/minus; PIM = Penalties in minutes; POS = Position

=== Leading goaltenders ===
Goaltenders playing at least 40% of their team's minutes are included in this list, sorted by save percentage.

Rank		Player	TOI	GA	Svs	SO	Sv%	GAA
1	(Switzerland)	Sarah Kung	141:18	1	22	1	95.65	0.42
2	(Slovakia)	Jana Budajová	240:00	7	146	1	95.42	1.75
3	(France)	Caroline Baldin	290:11	11	169	0	93.89	2.27
4	(Austria)	Paula Marchhart	238:14	10	131	0	92.91	2.52
5	(Switzerland)	Larissa Friant	158:42	4	35	0	89.74	1.51
6	(Norway)	Christine Berger	239:43	14	105	0	88.24	3.50
7	(Kazakhstan)	Alexandra Kalmukanova	137:33	23	105	0	82.03	10.03
8	(Kazakhstan)	Anastassiya Ogay	162:27	23	98	0	80.99	8.49

TOI = Time on ice (minutes:seconds); GA = Goals against; Svs = Saves; SO = Shutouts; Sv% = Save percentage; GAA = Goals against average

== Rosters ==
Austria	Goaltenders: Nicole Arnberger, Paula Marchhart; Defensemen: Julia Kainberger, Martina Kneß, Daniela Lackner, Paulina Polczik, Anna Schneider (C), Roxanne Schwinghammer; Forwards: Carina Arneitz, Martina Bacher (A), Marlene Brunner, Tamara Grascher, Victoria Hummel (A), Anja List, Alessandra Lopez, Anna Meixner, Nadine Ullrich, Monika Vlcek, Julia Willenshofer, Theresa Wolf; Head coach: Christian Dolinar; Assistant coaches: Marcel Sakáč, Franz Sturm
France	Goaltenders: Caroline Baldin, Nathalie Bore; Defensemen: Anaëlle Champdoizeau, Chantal Cleret, Mylène Goncalves (A), Emma Houle, Cindy Imbert, Marine Mathieu, Pauline Duprat; Forwards: Joanne Allemand, Jessy Castegnaro, Mathilde Durozelle, Lara Escudero, Soline Fohrer, Camille Gandit, Betty Jouanny (C), Emmanuelle Lahouratate Passard (A), Lou Pierrot, Morgane Rihet, Anaïs Sablayrolles; Head coach: Nolwenn Rousselle; Assistant coach: Jennifer Laloi
Kazakhstan	Goaltenders: Alexandra Kalmukanova, Anastassiya Ogay; Defensemen: Anna Belyanova, Natalya Karpeyeva (C), Viktoriya Kuzmina, Yelizaveta Larina, Dariya Moldabay (A), Anastassiya Orlova; Forwards: Dilyara Akramova, Nargiz Azanova, Yelena Azanova, Darya Dolgashova, Anel Karimzhanova, Azhar Khamimuldinova, Bulbul Kartanbayeva, Anastassiya Matussevich, Meruyert Ryspek (A), Kristina Shanshina, Inna Shutova, Saltanat Urpekbayeva; Head coach: Alexandr Sidorenko; Assistant coaches: Mariya Topkayeva, Viktor Fedorchenko
Norway	Goaltenders: Christine Berger, Ingrid Sandven; Defensemen: Hedda Gjerde, Marthe Holm, Silje Holøs (A), Emma Kvello, Lise Otnes; Forwards: Guro Nordli Bauck, Andrea Dalen (C), Anniken Edstrøm, Anette Fjeldstad, Kanutte Fladeby, Runa Græsdal, Madelen Hansen, Martine Henriksen, Emilie Solhaug Jensen, Victoria Løvdal, Ingrid Morset (A), Heidi Helena Soudská; Head coach: Birger Aaserud; Assistant coaches: Kjersti Malo Dyb, Line Kuvås
Slovakia	Goaltenders: Jana Budajová, Romana Kiapešová; Defensemen: Nikola Balášová (A), Katarína Luptáková, Nikola Michalcová, Petronela Novotná, Klaudia Olosová; Forwards: Rebeka Bondorová, Petra Časnochová, Nicol Čupková (C), Viktória Ihnaťová, Lívia Lúčová (A), Alica Miháliková, Zuzana Sabolčinová, Alexandra Sakalíková, Martina Staroňová, Miroslava Stašová, Ľubica Štofanková, Monika Vulganová, Alena Želonková; Head coach: Igor Andrejkovič; Assistant coach: Peter Gápa
Switzerland	Goaltenders: Larissa Friant, Sarah Kung; Defensemen: Livia Altmann, Laura Benz (A), Sarah Forster (C), Nadine Hofstetter, Lara Stalder, Karin Williner, Selina Wuttke; Forwards: Sara Benz, Mariko Dale, Kaitlyn McGregor, Laura Müller, Evelina Raselli, Nicole Schneider, Phoebe Stänz, Simona Teggi (A), Isabel Waidacher, Nina Waidacher, Sabrina Zollinger; Head coach: Dominik Schär; Assistant coach: Martin Inniger
