= Emmanuelle Passard =

French ice hockey player

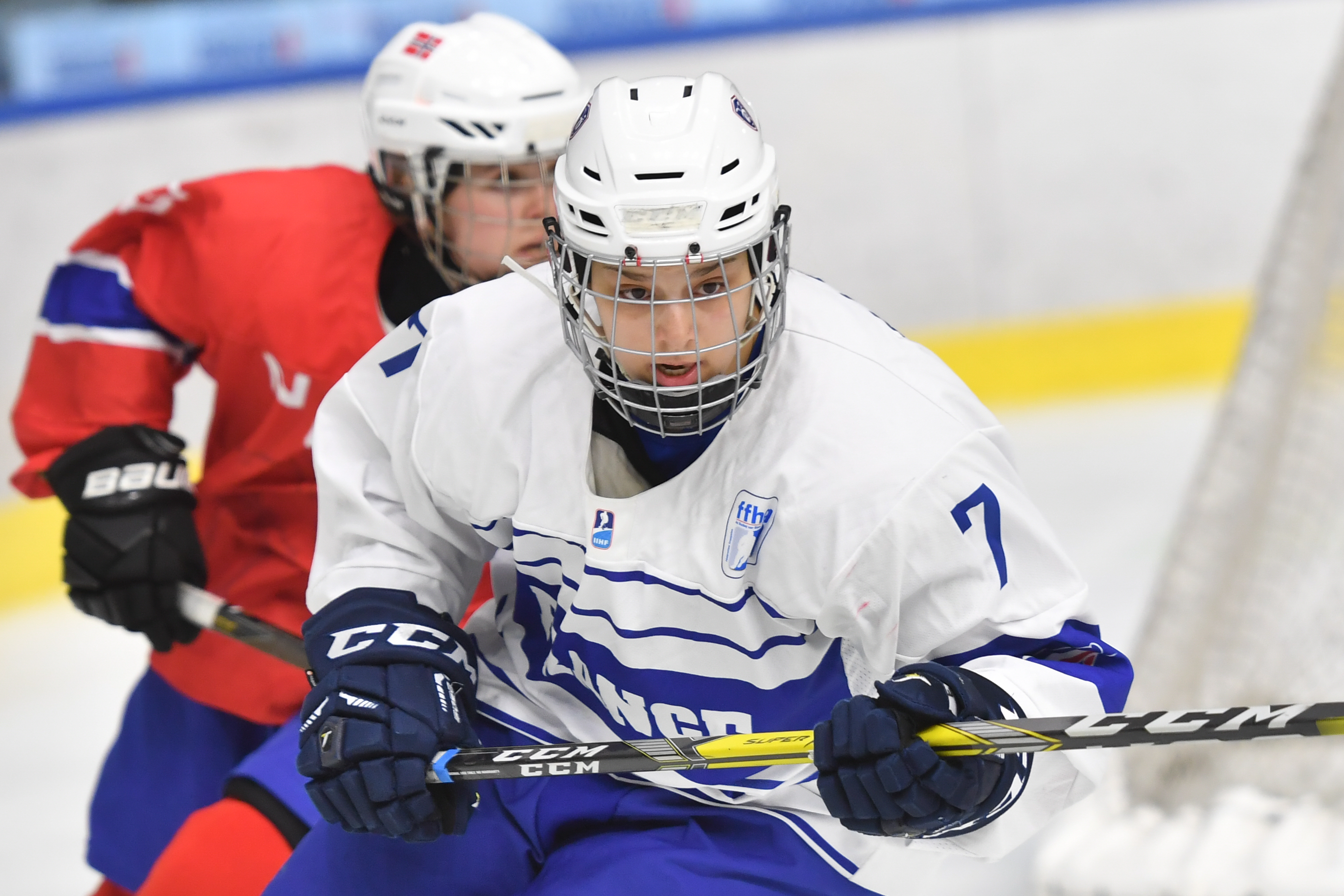
- Born: 27 January 1992 (age 33)
- Height: 1.68 m (5 ft 6 in)
- Weight: 75 kg (165 lb; 11 st 11 lb)
- Position: Forward
- Shoots: Left
- FFHG FÉ team Former teams: Jets d’Évry Viry: HIFK Helsinki; Montréal Carabins; EV Bomo Thun; HC Neuilly-sur-Marne; Pôle France
- National team: France
- Playing career: 2010–present

Emmanuelle Lahouratate-Passard (born 27 January 1992) is a French ice hockey player and member of the French national ice hockey team, currently playing in the FFHG Féminin Élite (FFHG FÉ) with Évry Viry.

Passard has represented France at nine IIHF World Women's Championships across three levels: Division 2/1B in 2011, 2012, and 2013; Division 1A in 2014, 2015, 2016, 2017, and 2018; and at the Top Division in 2019. She competed with French national under-18 team at the Division I tournaments of the IIHF World Women's U18 Championship in 2009 and 2010.

== Playing career ==
Before her college ice hockey career, Passard played in the French national women's league with Pôle France and the women’s team of HC Neuilly-sur-Marne and in the Swiss Leistungsklasse A (LKA) with EV Bomo Thun. During 2014 to 2019, she played with the Montréal Carabins of CIS/U Sport and was a member of the 2016 U Sports women's ice hockey championship winning team.

After her college career, Passard became the first French player to ever play in the Finnish Naisten Liiga after signing a one-year contract with HIFK Helsinki for the 2019–20 seasoni. She was the team's leading goal scorer during the twenty-game preliminary series (Finnish: Alkusarja) and was recognized as Naisten Liiga Player of the Month for December 2019. In the ten game divisional series, she led the lower division (Finnish: Alempi jatkosarja) in both goals and points, with 11 and 22, and was critical to HIFK's securing of a playoff berth.

== Career statistics ==
=== Regular season and playoffs ===
			Regular season					Playoffs
Season	Team	League	GP	G	A	Pts	PIM	GP	G	A	Pts	PIM
2011–12	Neuilly-sur-Marne	Champ. de France	10	14	11	25	0	–	–	–	–	–
2012–13	Neuilly-sur-Marne	Champ. de France	8	11	5	16	2	2	3	4	7	0
2013–14	EV Bomo Thun	LKA	18	17	6	23	8	3	0	0	0	0
2014–15	Montréal Carabins	CIS	18	7	6	13	2	9	2	3	5	0
2015–16	Montréal Carabins	CIS	18	3	3	6	10	7	2	3	5	0
2016–17	Montréal Carabins	U Sports	17	1	3	4	6	2	0	0	0	0
2017–18	Montréal Carabins	U Sports	20	4	1	5	4	9	2	1	3	0
2018–19	Montréal Carabins	U Sports	20	2	1	3	4	7	0	1	1	0
2019–20	HIFK	Naisten Liiga	30	28	19	47	8	3	1	1	2	0
2020–21	HIFK	Naisten Liiga	27	19	21	40	6	8	5	1	6	8
2021–22	HIFK	Naisten Liiga	28	18	15	33	0	12	2	4	6	4
U Sports totals			93	17	14	31	26	34	6	8	14	0
Naisten Liiga totals			85	65	55	120	14	23	8	6	14	12

Sources: RSEQ, Elite Prospects

=== International ===
Year	Team	Event	Result	GP	G	A	Pts	PIM
2009	France	WW18 D1	2nd	4	2	2	4	0
2010	France	WW18 D1	2nd	5	5	2	7	4
2011	France	WW D2	2nd	4	0	0	0	2
2012	France	WW D1B	3rd	5	4	2	6	0
2013	France	WW D1B	1st	5	5	3	8	2
2013	France	OGQ	DNQ	3	2	2	4	2
2014	France	WW D1A	3rd	5	1	2	3	4
2015	France	WW D1A	3rd	5	3	4	7	0
2016	France	WW D1A	2nd	5	3	3	6	2
2017	France	WW D1A	6th	5	0	0	0	2
2017	France	OGQ	DNQ	6	2	3	5	4
2018	France	WW D1A	1st	5	1	0	1	0
2019	France	WW	8th	5	1	0	1	2
2021	France	OGQ	DNQ	3	0	0	0	0
Junior totals				9	7	4	11	4
Senior totals				56	22	19	41	20
