= 2023 IIHF U18 Women's World Championship Division I =

Women's ice hockey tournament

2023 IIHF World Women's U18 Championship Division I
Tournament details
- Host countries: Italy; Poland
- Venues: 2 (in 2 host cities)
- Dates: 9–15 January 2023; 10–15 January 2023
- Teams: 11

The 2023 IIHF U18 Women's World Championship Division I was two international under-18 women's ice hockey tournaments organized by the International Ice Hockey Federation (IIHF). Divisions I A and I B represent the second and the third tier of competition at the 2023 IIHF U18 Women's World Championship.

== Group A tournament ==
2023 IIHF World Women's U18 Championship Division I A

Tournament details
- Host country: Italy
- City: Ritten
- Venue: 1 (in 1 host city)
- Dates: 9–15 January 2023
- Teams: 6

Official website
- www.iihf.com

The Division I Group A tournament was played in Ritten, Italy, from 9 to 15 January 2023.

=== Participating teams ===
Team	Qualification
Germany	8th place in 2022 World Championship Top Division and were relegated
France	2nd place in 2022 World Championship Division I A
Italy	Hosts; 3rd place in 2022 World Championship Division I A
Hungary	4th place in 2022 World Championship Division I A
Norway	5th place in 2022 World Championship Division I A
Austria	1st place in 2022 World Championship Division I B and were promoted

=== Final standings ===
Pos	Team	Pld	W	OTW	OTL	L	GF	GA	GD	Pts	Promotion or relegation
1	Germany	5	3	1	1	0	10	4	+6	12	Promoted to the 2024 Top Division
2	Italy (H)	5	2	1	1	1	8	5	+3	9 (Note: France 0–2 Italy)	
3	France	5	2	1	1	1	11	8	+3	9	
4	Hungary	5	2	1	0	2	11	10	+1	8	
5	Austria	5	0	1	2	2	6	11	−5	4	
6	Norway	5	1	0	0	4	8	16	−8	3	Relegated to the 2024 Division I B

Source: IIHF
Rules for classification: 1) points; 2) head-to-head points; 3) head-to-head goal difference; 4) head-to-head number of goals scored; 5) result against closest best-ranked team outside tied teams; 6) result against second-best ranked team outside tied teams; 7) seeding before tournament.
(H) Host

=== Results ===
9 January 2023; 13:00	Norway	1–3 (0–1, 1–2, 0–0)	Germany	Arena Ritten, Ritten

Game reference

9 January 2023; 16:30	Hungary	1–2 (0–0, 1–0, 0–2)	France	Arena Ritten, Ritten

Game reference

9 January 2023; 20:00	Austria	0–1 OT (0–0, 0–0, 0–0) (0–1)	Italy	Arena Ritten, Ritten

Game reference

10 January 2023; 13:00	Germany	3–1 (1–1, 2–0, 0–0)	Hungary	Arena Ritten, Ritten

Game reference

10 January 2023; 16:30	France	2–3 GWS (1–1, 1–0, 0–1) (0–0, 0–1)	Austria	Arena Ritten, Ritten

Game reference

10 January 2023; 20:00	Italy	4–1 (2–0, 1–0, 1–1)	Norway	Arena Ritten, Ritten

Game reference

12 January 2023; 13:00	Germany	2–0 (0–0, 1–0, 1–0)	Austria	Arena Ritten, Ritten

Game reference

12 January 2023; 16:30	France	0–2 (0–1, 0–1, 0–0)	Italy	Arena Ritten, Ritten

Game reference

12 January 2023; 20:00	Norway	2–3 (1–1, 0–0, 1–2)	Hungary	Arena Ritten, Ritten

Game reference

13 January 2023; 13:00	Italy	0–1 GWS (0–0, 0–0, 0–0) (0–0, 0–1)	Germany	Arena Ritten, Ritten

Game reference

13 January 2023; 16:30	France	5–1 (2–0, 3–0, 0–1)	Norway	Arena Ritten, Ritten

Game reference

13 January 2023; 20:00	Hungary	3–2 OT (1–0, 1–2, 0–0) (1–0)	Austria	Arena Ritten, Ritten

Game reference

15 January 2023; 13:00	Austria	1–3 (0–1, 0–2, 1–0)	Norway	Arena Ritten, Ritten

Game reference

15 January 2023; 16:30	Italy	1–3 (1–1, 0–2, 0–0)	Hungary	Arena Ritten, Ritten

Game reference

15 January 2023; 20:00	Germany	1–2 GWS (0–0, 0–0, 1–1) (0–0, 0–1)	France	Arena Ritten, Ritten

Game reference

== Group B tournament ==
2023 IIHF World Women's U18 Championship Division I B

Tournament details
- Host country: Poland
- City: Katowice
- Venue: 1 (in 1 host city)
- Dates: 10–15 January 2023
- Teams: 5

Official website
- www.iihf.com

The Division I Group B tournament was played in Katowice, Poland, from 10 to 15 January 2023.

=== Participating teams ===
Team	Qualification
Poland	Hosts; 2nd place in 2022 World Championship Division I B
Chinese Taipei	3rd place in 2022 World Championship Division I B
South Korea	4th place in 2022 World Championship Division I B
Denmark	5th place in 2022 World Championship Division I B
Spain	1st place in 2022 World Championship Division II and were promoted
~~China~~	Withdrawn from 2022 World Championship Division I B; withdrawn also from this year's tournament

=== Final standings ===
Pos	Team	Pld	W	OTW	OTL	L	GF	GA	GD	Pts	Promotion or relegation
1	Denmark	4	4	0	0	0	19	3	+16	12	Promoted to the 2024 Division I A
2	Poland (H)	4	3	0	0	1	15	3	+12	9	
3	Spain	4	1	1	0	2	6	9	−3	5	
4	South Korea	4	1	0	1	2	5	12	−7	4	
5	Chinese Taipei	4	0	0	0	4	2	20	−18	0	
–	~~China~~	0	0	0	0	0	0	0	0	0	Withdrawn; relegated to the 2024 Division II A

Source: IIHF
Rules for classification: 1) points; 2) head-to-head points; 3) head-to-head goal difference; 4) head-to-head number of goals scored; 5) result against closest best-ranked team outside tied teams; 6) result against second-best ranked team outside tied teams; 7) seeding before tournament.
(H) Host

=== Results ===
10 January 2023; 16:30	Poland	6–0 (1–0, 2–0, 3–0)	South Korea	Jantor Arena, Katowice

Game reference

10 January 2023; 20:00	Spain	4–1 (1–1, 2–0, 1–0)	Chinese Taipei	Jantor Arena, Katowice

Game reference

11 January 2023; 19:00	Denmark	3–0 (2–0, 0–0, 1–0)	Spain	Jantor Arena, Katowice

Game reference

12 January 2023; 16:30	Denmark	3–1 (1–0, 2–0, 0–1)	Poland	Jantor Arena, Katowice

Game reference

12 January 2023; 20:00	Chinese Taipei	0–3 (0–1, 0–1, 0–1)	South Korea	Jantor Arena, Katowice

Game reference

13 January 2023; 16:30	Spain	0–4 (0–2, 0–0, 0–2)	Poland	Jantor Arena, Katowice

Game reference

14 January 2023; 16:30	Chinese Taipei	1–9 (0–3, 1–1, 0–5)	Denmark	Jantor Arena, Katowice

Game reference

14 January 2023; 20:00	South Korea	1–2 OT (0–0, 0–0, 1–1) (0–1)	Spain	Jantor Arena, Katowice

Game reference

15 January 2023; 16:30	Poland	4–0 (0–0, 2–0, 2–0)	Chinese Taipei	Jantor Arena, Katowice

Game reference

15 January 2023; 20:00	South Korea	1–4 (0–2, 0–1, 1–1)	Denmark	Jantor Arena, Katowice

Game reference
