= Lenka Čurmová =

Slovak ice hockey player

- Born: 8 April 1997 (age 27); Michalovce, Slovakia
- Height: 173 cm (5 ft 8 in)
- Weight: 60 kg (132 lb; 9 st 6 lb)
- Position: Defense
- Shoots: Left
- Played for: Lekands IF; Metropolitan Riveters; Buffalo Beauts; HPK Hämeenlinna; HC ŠKP Bratislava; ŽHK Šarišanka Prešov
- National team: Slovakia
- Playing career: 2009–present

Lenka Čurmová (born 8 April 1997) is a Slovak ice hockey defender. She most recently played in the Swedish Women's Hockey League (SDHL) with Leksands IF during the 2022–23 season.

Čurmová and Slovak national team teammate Iveta Klimášová were the first Slovak players to play in the Premier Hockey Federation (PHF).

== Playing career ==
Čurmová began her career at age twelve, debuting with ŽHK Šarišanka Prešov in the 2009–10 season of the 1.liga žien, Slovakia’s top-tier women’s league. She played with Šarišanka for six seasons, before transferring to HC ŠKP Bratislava of the Elite Women's Hockey League (EWHL). She remained with ŠKP Bratislava until her relocation to North America in 2019 in order to play with the Buffalo Beauts of the National Women's Hockey League (NWHL; renamed PHF in 2021).

The Beauts‘ first game of the 2019–20 season, 5 October 2019 against the Connecticut Whale, was history making; Čurmová became the first Slovak player to ever score a goal in NWHL history when she netted the Beauts‘ opening goal, assisted by MJ Pelletier and Corinne Buie. Later that week, she was the first Slovak player to be named NWHL Player of the Week. She was selected by Team Packer for the 2020 NWHL All-Star Game. In May 2020, she re-signed with the team for the 2020–21 season.

=== International play ===
Čurmová first played with the Slovak national under-18 team at the qualification tournament and final tournament of the 2013 IIHF World Women's U18 Championship – Division I. She went on to play with the team at the 2014 World Women's U18 Championship DI, where she was the highest scoring defenceman, and at the 2014 World Women's U18 Championship DI, where she was the Best Defenceman of the tournament as selected by the directorate.

Čurmová made her first appearance with the senior Slovak national team at age fifteen, playing all five games of the 2013 IIHF Women's World Championship Division I. She has continued to appear internationally with the senior team, including in the qualification tournaments for the 2018 Winter Olympics and 2022 Winter Olympics, and served as team captain during the 2018–19 season.

== Career statistics ==
=== Regular season and playoffs ===
			Regular season					Playoffs
Season	Team	League	GP	G	A	Pts	PIM	GP	G	A	Pts	PIM
2009–10	ŽHK Šarišanka Prešov	1.liga žien	15	0	3	3	16	–	–	–	–	–
2010–11	ŽHK Šarišanka Prešov	1.liga žien	13	0	4	4	6	6	0	1	1	8
2011–12	ŽHK Šarišanka Prešov	1.liga žien	12	0	4	4	16	8	0	2	2	4
2012–13	ŽHK Šarišanka Prešov	1.liga žien	8	0	1	1	2	10	1	3	4	2
2013–14	ŽHK Šarišanka Prešov	1.liga žien	14	1	4	5	10	7	2	3	5	10
2014–15	ŽHK Šarišanka Prešov	1.liga žien	1	0	0	0	2	3	0	0	0	2
2014–15	ŠKP Bratislava	EWHL	19	0	3	3	12	–	–	–	–	–
2015–16	ŽHK Šarišanka Prešov	Extraliga žien	1	0	1	1	2	3	0	2	2	2
2015–16	ŠKP Bratislava	EWHL	13	1	5	6	2	–	–	–	–	–
2016–17	ŠKP Bratislava	EWHL	11	0	7	7	8	–	–	–	–	–
2017–18	ŠKP Bratislava	EWHL	13	0	6	6	8	–	–	–	–	–
2017–18	ŠKP Bratislava	Extraliga žien	13	4	11	15	6	6	2	9	11	6
2019–20	Buffalo Beauts	NWHL	23	3	8	11	28	1	0	0	0	0
2020–21	HPK Hämeenlinna	NSML	2	0	1	1	2	2	0	0	0	0
2020–21	Buffalo Beauts	NWHL	6	0	1	1	10	–	–	–	–	–
2021–22	Metropolitan Riveters	PHF	10	0	0	0	0	1	0	0	0	0
2022–23	Leksands IF	SDHL	5	0	0	0	2	–	–	–	–	–
Extraliga žien totals			77	5	28	33	60	43	5	20	25	34
EWHL totals			56	1	21	22	30	–	–	–	–	–
PHF totals			39	3	9	12	38	2	0	0	0	0

=== International ===
Year	Team	Event	Rank	GP	G	A	Pts	PIM
2012	Slovakia U18	WW18 D1Q	Q	5	0	1	1	2
2013	Slovakia U18	WW18 D1	5th	5	0	0	0	4
2013	Slovakia	WW D1A	3rd	5	0	0	0	0
2014	Slovakia U18	WW18 D1	5th	5	1	2	3	2
2015	Slovakia U18	WW18 D1	3rd	5	1	5	6	8
2015	Slovakia	WW D1B	1st	5	0	0	0	0
2016	Slovakia	WW D1A	6th	5	0	0	0	8
2016	Slovakia	OGQ	DNQ	3	0	0	0	2
2018	Slovakia	WW D1A	6th	5	1	1	2	2
2019	Slovakia	WW D1A	5th	5	0	0	0	4
2021	Slovakia	OGQ	DNQ	3	0	0	0	0
Junior totals				20	2	8	10	16
Senior totals				25	1	1	2	14
