= 2011 IIHF World Women's U18 Championship Division I =

Tournament details
- Host country: Russia
- Venue: 1 (in 1 host city)
- Dates: 28 March – 3 April 2011
- Teams: 6

Tournament statistics
- Games played: 15
- Goals scored: 111 (7.4 per game)
- Scoring leader: Liudmila Belyakova (16 points)

The 2011 IIHF World Women's U18 Championship Division I tournament was played in Dmitrov, Russia, from 28 March to 3 April 2011. The hosts Russia won the tournament and after a year they returned to the top division. There was no relegation per se; both France and Kazakhstan had to enter the qualification tournament for the 2012 Division I championship.

== Final standings ==
Team	Pld	W	OTW	OTL	L	GF	GA	GD	Pts	Promotion or relegation
Russia	5	5	0	0	0	44	2	+42	15	Promoted to the Top Division of the 2012 IIHF World Women's U18 Championship
Slovakia	5	4	0	0	1	19	11	+8	12	
Austria	5	3	0	0	2	19	14	+5	9	
Norway	5	2	0	0	3	16	11	+5	6	
France	5	1	0	0	4	5	25	−20	3	Relegated to the 2012 Qualification Tournament
Kazakhstan	5	0	0	0	5	8	48	−40	0	Relegated to the 2012 Qualification Tournament

Source: IIHF

== Results ==
All times are local (Moscow Time – UTC+04).

28 March 2011; 12:00	Norway	0–1 (0–1, 0–0, 0–0)	Slovakia	Arena, Dmitrov; Attendance: 150

Game reference

28 March 2011; 15:30	Austria	5–0 (2–0, 1–0, 2–0)	France	Arena, Dmitrov; Attendance: 100

Game reference

28 March 2011; 19:00	Kazakhstan	0–19 (0–5, 0–8, 0–6)	Russia	Arena, Dmitrov; Attendance: 2000

Game reference

29 March 2011; 12:00	France	0–5 (0–3, 0–2, 0–0)	Norway	Arena, Dmitrov; Attendance: 100

Game reference

29 March 2011; 15:30	Slovakia	11–3 (5–2, 3–0, 3–1)	Kazakhstan	Arena, Dmitrov; Attendance: 100

Game reference

29 March 2011; 19:00	Russia	6–1 (1–1, 2–0, 3–0)	Austria	Arena, Dmitrov; Attendance: 1000

Game reference

31 March 2011; 12:00	Kazakhstan	0–7 (0–1, 0–3, 0–3)	Austria	Arena, Dmitrov; Attendance: 100

Game reference

31 March 2011; 15:30	France	1–2 (1–1, 0–1, 0–0)	Slovakia	Arena, Dmitrov; Attendance: 56

Game reference

31 March 2011; 19:00	Russia	4–1 (2–0, 0–1, 2–0)	Norway	Arena, Dmitrov; Attendance: 1100

Game reference

1 April 2011; 12:00	France	4–3 (1–1, 1–1, 2–1)	Kazakhstan	Arena, Dmitrov; Attendance: 60

Game reference

1 April 2011; 15:30	Austria	4–3 (1–0, 1–1, 2–2)	Norway	Arena, Dmitrov; Attendance: 70

Game reference

1 April 2011; 19:00	Slovakia	0–5 (0–2, 0–3, 0–0)	Russia	Arena, Dmitrov; Attendance: 1500

Game reference

3 April 2011; 12:00	Norway	7–2 (3–0, 3–1, 1–1)	Kazakhstan	Arena, Dmitrov; Attendance: 65

Game reference

3 April 2011; 15:30	Slovakia	5–2 (2–0, 1–0, 2–2)	Austria	Arena, Dmitrov; Attendance: 75

Game reference

3 April 2011; 19:00	Russia	10–0 (4–0, 3–0, 3–0)	France	Arena, Dmitrov; Attendance: 1850

Game reference

== Scoring leaders ==
List shows the top skaters sorted by points, then goals.

Player	GP	G	A	Pts	+/−	PIM	POS
(Russia) Liudmila Belyakova	5	11	5	16	+13	4	FW
(Russia) Yevgenia Dyupina	5	6	9	15	+11	4	FW
(Russia) Yelena Dergacheva	5	2	11	13	+14	8	FW
(Austria) Victoria Hummel	5	8	4	12	+6	8	FW
(Russia) Valeria Pavlova	5	7	5	12	+10	2	FW
(Austria) Anna Meixner	5	4	8	12	+8	4	FW
(Norway) Martine Henriksen	5	6	4	10	+7	4	FW
(Norway) Madelen Hansen	5	1	9	10	+6	8	FW
(Slovakia) Viktória Ihnaťová	5	7	2	9	+4	2	FW
(Russia) Diana Bulatova	5	3	5	8	+10	2	FW

GP = Games played; G = Goals; A = Assists; Pts = Points; +/− = Plus/minus; PIM = Penalties in minutes; POS = Position

== Leading goaltenders ==
Only the top six goaltenders, based on save percentage, who have played 40% of their team's minutes are included in this list.

Player	TOI	GA	GAA	Sv%	SO
(Russia) Anna Prugova	209:50	2	0.57	96.15	0
(Austria) Paula Marchhart	220:00	12	3.27	90.32	1
(Slovakia) Romana Kiapešová	300:00	11	2.20	89.81	1
(Norway) Toini Veronica Nilsen	299:17	11	2.21	89.81	1
(France) Mathilde Bopp	299:38	25	5.01	89.75	0
(Kazakhstan) Anastasia Ogai	281:36	45	9.59	80.09	0

TOI = Time on ice (minutes:seconds); GA = Goals against; GAA = Goals against average; Sv% = Save percentage; SO = Shutouts
