= 2012 IIHF U18 Women's World Championship Division I =

Tournament details
- Host country: Norway
- Venue: 1 (in 1 host city)
- Dates: 29 December 2011 – 4 January 2012
- Teams: 6

Tournament statistics
- Games played: 15
- Goals scored: 82 (5.47 per game)
- Scoring leader: (Hungary) Alexandra Huszák (10 points)

The 2012 IIHF U18 Women's World Championship Division I tournament was the fourth Division I tournament of the U18 Women's World Championship in ice hockey to be organized by the International Ice Hockey Federation (IIHF). For 2012, Division I comprised two events – a qualification tournament for Division I and the Division I tournament. The qualification tournament represented the lowest competition tier of the 2012 IIHF U18 Women's World Championship and the Division I tournament represented the second tier.

The qualification tournament was played in Asiago, Italy, from 29 November to 4 December 2011. The Division I tournament was played in Tromsø, Norway from 29 December 2011 to 4 January 2012.

Hungary won both the Division I qualification tournament and the Division I tournament itself in what was described as the "biggest success in Hungarian women's hockey." After winning all ten of their games across the qualification and Division I tournament combined, the Hungarians earned the opportunity to compete against the elite hockey nations in the 2013 Top Division tournament, for which more than fifteen of the twenty players from the 2012 roster remained eligible.

== Qualification tournament ==
=== Final standings ===
Team	Pld	W	OTW	OTL	L	GF	GA	GD	Pts	Qualification
Hungary	5	5	0	0	0	37	4	+33	15	Qualified
Great Britain	5	2	1	1	1	19	16	+3	9	Qualified
China	5	2	1	0	2	15	19	−4	8	
Italy	5	2	0	1	2	21	14	+7	7	
France	5	2	0	0	3	10	9	+1	6	
Kazakhstan	5	0	0	0	5	4	44	−40	0	

== Final tournament ==
=== Final standings ===
Team	Pld	W	OTW	OTL	L	GF	GA	GD	Pts	Promotion or relegation
Hungary	5	4	1	0	0	24	10	+14	14	Promoted to the 2013 Top Division
Austria	5	3	1	0	1	16	9	+7	11	
Japan	5	3	0	2	0	14	7	+7	11	
Norway	5	2	0	0	3	13	13	0	6	
Great Britain	5	1	0	0	4	10	14	−4	3	Relegated to the 2013 Division I Qualification
Slovakia	5	0	0	0	5	5	29	−24	0	Relegated to the 2013 Division I Qualification

Source: IIHF

=== Results ===
All times are local (CET – UTC+01).

29 December 2011; 12:30	Great Britain	1–2 (0-0, 1-1, 0-1)	Japan	Tromsø Ishallen, Tromsø; Attendance: 100

Game reference

29 December 2011; 16:00	Hungary	4–3 (1-0, 2-2, 1-1)	Austria	Tromsø Ishallen, Tromsø; Attendance: 63

Game reference

29 December 2011; 19:30	Norway	7–2 (3-0, 3-1, 1-1)	Slovakia	Tromsø Ishallen, Tromsø; Attendance: 121

Game reference

31 December 2011; 10:30	Slovakia	0–7 (0-4, 0-3, 0-0)	Hungary	Tromsø Ishallen, Tromsø; Attendance: 50

Game reference

31 December 2011; 14:00	Austria	4–1 (1-0, 2-1, 1-0)	Great Britain	Tromsø Ishallen, Tromsø; Attendance: 63

Game reference

31 December 2011; 17:30	Japan	3–1 (1-0, 2-1, 0-0)	Norway	Tromsø Ishallen, Tromsø; Attendance: 120

Game reference

1 January 2012; 12:30	Slovakia	2–5 (1-0, 1-4, 0-1)	Austria	Tromsø Ishallen, Tromsø; Attendance: 45

Game reference

1 January 2012; 16:00	Japan	2–3 GWS (1-0, 0-1, 1-1) (OT: 0-0) (SO: 0-1)	Hungary	Tromsø Ishallen, Tromsø; Attendance: 70

Game reference

1 January 2012; 19:30	Great Britain	1–2 (0-2, 1-0, 0-0)	Norway	Tromsø Ishallen, Tromsø; Attendance: 120

Game reference

3 January 2012; 12:30	Austria	2–1 GWS (0-1, 0-0, 1-0) (0-0, 1-0)	Japan	Tromsø Ishallen, Tromsø; Attendance: 36

Game reference

3 January 2012; 16:00	Slovakia	1–4 (0-2, 0-1, 1-1)	Great Britain	Tromsø Ishallen, Tromsø; Attendance: 60

Game reference

3 January 2012; 19:30	Norway	2–5 (1-2, 1-0, 0-3)	Hungary	Tromsø Ishallen, Tromsø; Attendance: 210

Game reference

4 January 2012; 12:30	Hungary	5–3 (0-1, 3-1, 2-1)	Great Britain	Tromsø Ishallen, Tromsø; Attendance: 50

Game reference

4 January 2012; 16:00	Japan	6–0 (1-0, 3-0, 2-0)	Slovakia	Tromsø Ishallen, Tromsø; Attendance: 75

Game reference

4 January 2012; 19:30	Austria	2–1 (0-0, 0-1, 2-0)	Norway	Tromsø Ishallen, Tromsø; Attendance: 300

Game reference

== Awards and statistics ==
=== Awards ===
Best players selected by the directorate

Position	Player
Goaltender	(Japan) Shizuka Takahashi
Defender	(Norway) Victoria Løvdal
Forward	(Hungary) Alexandra Huszák

Source: IIHF

Best player of each team selected by coaches

Team	Player
(Austria)	Martina Kneß
(United Kingdom)	Louise Adams
(Hungary)	Fanni Gasparics
(Japan)	Yui Sawade
(Norway)	Mathea Fischer
(Slovakia)	Nikola Kaliská

Source: IIHF

=== Scoring leaders ===
List shows the top skaters sorted by points, then goals. All players are listed in the event of a tie in points.

GP = Games played; G = Goals; A = Assists; Pts = Points; PIM = Penalties in minutes; +/− = Plus/minus; POS = Position

	Player	GP	G	A	Pts	+/−	PIM	POS
(Hungary)	Alexandra Huszák	5	7	3	10	+6	10	F
(Hungary)	Fanni Gasparics	5	2	8	10	+6	0	F
(Norway)	Mathea Fischer	5	3	5	8	+4	2	F
(Norway)	Jeanett Hjelm	5	2	6	8	+5	8	F
(Austria)	Julia Willenshofer	5	5	1	6	+4	8	F
(Hungary)	Andrea Kiss	5	4	2	6	+7	0	F
(United Kingdom)	Paige Henry	5	3	3	6	–1	0	F
(Hungary)	Jekatyerina Maszlova	5	2	4	6	+5	2	F
(Japan)	Rui Ukita	5	4	1	5	+2	0	D
(United Kingdom)	Katherine Gale	5	3	2	5	+1	4	F
(Norway)	Ramona Wais	5	3	2	5	+6	0	F

=== Leading goaltenders ===
Only the goaltenders who played at least 40% of their team's minutes are included in this list, sorted by save percentage.

TOI = Time on ice (minutes:seconds); SOG = Shots on goal; GA = Goals against; GAA = Goals against average; Sv% = Save percentage; SO = Shutouts

	Player	TOI	SOG	GA	GAA	Sv%	SO
(Austria)	Paula Marchhart	244:44	129	8	1.96	93.80	0
(Norway)	Toini Veronica Nilsen	179:02	102	7	2.35	93.14	0
(Japan)	Shizuka Takahashi	270:00	99	7	1.56	92.93	0
(Hungary)	Anikó Németh	305:00	115	10	1.97	91.30	1
(Norway)	Ingrid Sandven	119:32	50	5	2.51	90.00	0
(United Kingdom)	Beatrice Fletcher	233:49	119	12	3.08	89.92	0
(Slovakia)	Zuzana Štefaniaková	196:40	89	15	4.58	83.15	0
