= 2013 IIHF U18 Women's World Championship Division I =

2013 IIHF World Women's U18 Championship Division I

Tournament details
- Host country: Switzerland
- Venue: 1 (in 1 host city)
- Dates: 2 – 8 January 2013
- Teams: 6

Tournament statistics
- Games played: 15
- Goals scored: 71 (4.73 per game)
- Scoring leader: (Japan) Ayuko Aoki (7 points)

The 2013 IIHF U18 Women's World Championship Division I final tournament was played in Romanshorn, Switzerland, from 2 to 8 January 2013. Japan won the tournament and after two years in Division I they returned to the Top Division.

== Qualification tournament ==
The qualification tournament was played in Dumfries, Great Britain, from 27 October to 1 November 2012. The top two teams, France and Slovakia, were promoted to Division I of this year, but starting in 2014 one team will be promoted from the qualification tournament and will wait until the following year (2015) to play in Division I. Though not indicated at the time of the tournament, the 2014 schedule indicates that Austria was relegated to the qualification level, and Great Britain was promoted.

=== Final standings ===
Team	Pld	W	OTW	OTL	L	GF	GA	GD	Pts	Qualification
France	5	4	0	0	1	14	5	+9	12	Qualified for 2013 Division I
Slovakia	5	4	0	0	1	27	11	+16	12	Qualified for 2013 Division I
Great Britain	5	3	0	0	2	21	9	+12	9	Qualified for 2014 Division I
Italy	5	2	1	0	2	10	9	+1	8	
China	5	1	0	1	3	13	20	−7	4	
Kazakhstan	5	0	0	0	5	3	34	−31	0	

- The game Kazakhstan – Italy was forfeited (0–5) because the Kazakh team arrived too late.

== Final tournament ==
=== Final standings ===
Team	Pld	W	OTW	OTL	L	GF	GA	GD	Pts	Promotion or relegation
Japan	5	4	1	0	0	18	7	+11	14	Promoted to the 2014 Top Division
Switzerland	5	3	0	1	1	17	6	+11	10	
France	5	3	0	0	2	11	11	0	9	
Norway	5	3	0	0	2	10	10	0	9	
Slovakia	5	1	0	0	4	8	12	−4	3	
Austria	5	0	0	0	5	7	25	−18	0	Relegated to the 2014 Division I Qualification

Source: IIHF

=== Results ===
All times are local (CET – UTC+01).

2 January 2013; 13:00	France	0 – 4 (0-1, 0-1, 0-2)	Japan	EZO Eissportzentrum Oberthurgau, Romanshorn; Attendance: 77

Game reference

2 January 2013; 16:30	Norway	4 – 2 (0-1, 2-1, 2-0)	Austria	EZO Eissportzentrum Oberthurgau, Romanshorn; Attendance: 103

Game reference

2 January 2013; 20:00	Slovakia	1 – 2 (0-2, 1-0, 0-0)	Switzerland	EZO Eissportzentrum Oberthurgau, Romanshorn; Attendance: 374

Game reference

3 January 2013; 16:30	Japan	2 – 1 (2-0, 0-0, 0-1)	Slovakia	EZO Eissportzentrum Oberthurgau, Romanshorn; Attendance: 78

Game reference

3 January 2013; 20:00	Switzerland	1 – 2 (0-0, 1-1, 0-1)	Norway	EZO Eissportzentrum Oberthurgau, Romanshorn; Attendance: 388

Game reference

4 January 2013; 19:00	Austria	2 – 3 (1-0, 0-1, 1-2)	France	EZO Eissportzentrum Oberthurgau, Romanshorn; Attendance: 94

Game reference

5 January 2013; 13:00	Slovakia	1 – 2 (1-2, 0-0, 0-0)	Norway	EZO Eissportzentrum Oberthurgau, Romanshorn; Attendance: 103

Game reference

5 January 2013; 16:30	Austria	2 – 6 (0-3, 2-1, 0-2)	Japan	EZO Eissportzentrum Oberthurgau, Romanshorn; Attendance: 95

Game reference

5 January 2013; 20:00	Switzerland	3 – 0 (0-0, 0-0, 3-0)	France	EZO Eissportzentrum Oberthurgau, Romanshorn; Attendance: 391

Game reference

6 January 2013; 16:30	Japan	3 – 2 GWS (1-0, 1-2, 0-0) (0-0, 1-0)	Switzerland	EZO Eissportzentrum Oberthurgau, Romanshorn; Attendance: 403

Game reference

7 January 2013; 15:30	Norway	0 – 3 (0-0, 0-2, 0-1)	France	EZO Eissportzentrum Oberthurgau, Romanshorn; Attendance: 87

Game reference

7 January 2013; 19:00	Austria	1 – 3 (0-2, 0-0, 1-1)	Slovakia	EZO Eissportzentrum Oberthurgau, Romanshorn; Attendance: 62

Game reference

8 January 2013; 13:00	France	5 – 2 (3-0, 0-0, 2-2)	Slovakia	EZO Eissportzentrum Oberthurgau, Romanshorn; Attendance: 187

Game reference

8 January 2013; 16:30	Japan	3 – 2 (0-1, 1-0, 2-1)	Norway	EZO Eissportzentrum Oberthurgau, Romanshorn; Attendance: 143

Game reference

8 January 2013; 20:00	Switzerland	9 – 0 (2-0, 4-0, 3-0)	Austria	EZO Eissportzentrum Oberthurgau, Romanshorn; Attendance: 352

Game reference
