= Kamila Wieczorek =

Polish ice hockey player (born 1997)

- Born: 10 March 1997 (age 29) Oświęcim, Poland
- Height: 169 cm (5 ft 7 in)
- Weight: 59 kg (130 lb; 9 st 4 lb)
- Position: Right wing
- Shoots: Left
- TLHK team Former teams: Naprzód Janów: Metropolis Katowice; Unia Oświęcim; EV Bomo Thun; Malmö Redhawks; Hvidovre IK; Popradské Líšky
- National team: Poland
- Playing career: c. 2013–present

Kamila Wieczorek (born 10 March 1997) is a Polish ice hockey forward and member of the Polish national ice hockey team, currently playing in the Tauron Liga Hokeja Kobiet (TLHK) with the women's representative team of Naprzód Janów.

She has previously played in the Slovak Women's Extraliga with the Popradské líšky (ŽHK Poprad), the Danish KvindeLiga with Hvidovre IK, the Swedish Damettan with the Malmö Redhawks, the Swiss Women's League (SWHL A) with EV Bomo Thun, and the European Women's Hockey League (EWHL) with Silesian Metropolis Katowice.

== International play ==
As a junior player with the Polish national under-18 team, she participated in the Division I Qualification tournaments of the IIHF U18 Women's World Championship in 2014 and 2015.

Wieczorek has represented Poland in the lower divisions at eight IIHF Women's World Championships – the Division II Group A level in 2013, 2014, 2015, and 2016, and the Division I Group B level in 2017, 2018, 2019, and 2022.
