= 2014 IIHF U18 Women's World Championship Division I =

2014 IIHF World Women's U18 Championship Division I

Tournament details
- Host countries: Germany; Poland
- Venues: 2 (in 2 host cities)
- Dates: 29 March – 4 April 2014; 18 – 23 March 2014
- Teams: 11

Tournament statistics
- Scoring leader: (Switzerland) Alina Müller (12 points)

The 2014 IIHF U18 Women's World Championship Division I was a couple of international under-18 women ice hockey competitions organised by the International Ice Hockey Federation. The Division I "A" and Division I Qualification tournaments represent the second and the third tier of the IIHF World Women's U18 Championships.

== Division I "A" ==
The 2014 Division I "A" tournament was played in Füssen, Germany, from 29 March to 4 April 2014.

=== Final standings ===
Team	Pld	W	OTW	OTL	L	GF	GA	GD	Pts	Promotion or relegation
Switzerland	5	4	0	1	0	19	4	+15	13	Promoted to the 2015 Top Division
France	5	3	1	0	1	16	10	+6	11	
Germany	5	3	1	0	1	20	8	+12	11	
Norway	5	2	0	0	3	11	14	−3	6	
Slovakia	5	1	0	1	3	7	10	−3	4	
Great Britain	5	0	0	0	5	4	31	−27	0	Relegated to the 2015 Division I Qualification

Source: IIHF

=== Results ===
All times are local (CET/CEST – UTC+01/UTC+02).

29 March 2014; 12:30	Slovakia	2 – 3 (0-0, 0-1, 2-1) (OT: 0-1)	France	Arena, Füssen; Attendance: 100

Game reference

29 March 2014; 16:00	Great Britain	0 – 10 (0-3, 0-4, 0-3)	Germany	Arena, Füssen; Attendance: 200

Game reference

29 March 2014; 19:30	Norway	1 – 3 (0-2, 0-1, 1-0)	Switzerland	Arena, Füssen; Attendance: 150

Game reference

30 March 2014; 16:00	France	5 – 1 (2-0, 1-0, 2-1)	Great Britain	Arena, Füssen; Attendance: 100

Game reference

30 March 2014; 19:30	Germany	3 – 2 (1-0, 1-0, 1-2)	Norway	Arena, Füssen; Attendance: 100

Game reference

31 March 2014; 19:00	Switzerland	1 – 0 (0-0, 0-0, 1-0)	Slovakia	Arena, Füssen; Attendance: 150

Game reference

1 April 2014; 12:30	Great Britain	2 – 5 (1-2, 0-0, 1-3)	Norway	Arena, Füssen; Attendance: 100

Game reference

1 April 2014; 16:00	Switzerland	5 – 0 (3-0, 1-0, 1-0)	France	Arena, Füssen; Attendance: 100

Game reference

1 April 2014; 19:30	Germany	2 – 1 (1-0, 1-1, 0-0)	Slovakia	Arena, Füssen; Attendance: 150

Game reference

2 April 2014; 19:00	France	3 – 2 (1-1, 0-0, 2-1)	Germany	Arena, Füssen; Attendance: 150

Game reference

3 April 2014; 16:00	Norway	3 – 1 (2-1, 1-0, 0-0)	Slovakia	Arena, Füssen; Attendance: 100

Game reference

3 April 2014; 19:30	Switzerland	8 – 0 (2-0, 3-0, 3-0)	Great Britain	Arena, Füssen; Attendance: 150

Game reference

4 April 2014; 12:30	France	5 – 0 (0-0, 3-0, 2-0)	Norway	Arena, Füssen; Attendance: 100

Game reference

4 April 2014; 16:00	Slovakia	3 – 1 (2-1, 0-0, 1-0)	Great Britain	Arena, Füssen; Attendance: 100

Game reference

4 April 2014; 19:30	Germany	3 – 2 (1-1, 0-0, 1-1) (OT: 1-0)	Switzerland	Arena, Füssen; Attendance: 400

Game reference

== Division I Qualification ==
The 2014 Division I Qualification tournament was played in Krynica-Zdrój, Poland, from 18 to 23 March 2014. Team Poland marked the debut at this level.

=== Final standings ===
Team	Pld	W	OTW	OTL	L	GF	GA	GD	Pts	Promotion
Austria	4	4	0	0	0	21	3	+18	12	Promoted to the 2015 Division I "A"
Poland	4	2	1	0	1	13	8	+5	8	
China	4	1	1	0	2	11	15	−4	5	
Italy	4	0	1	1	2	5	12	−7	3	
Kazakhstan	4	0	0	2	2	5	17	−12	2	

Source: IIHF

=== Results ===
All times are local (CET – UTC+01).

18 March 2014; 13:00	China	1 – 7 (1–3, 0–1, 0–3)	Austria	Krynica Ice Stadium, Krynica-Zdrój; Attendance: 100

Game reference

Liu Yuchan
Zhang Tianyi
Goalies
Nina Prunster
Referee:
(Russia) Elena Ivanova
Linesmen:
(Switzerland) Magali Anex
(Poland) Joanna Pobozniak

	0–1	J. Pesendorfer (J. Schneeberger) – 4:25
	0–2	A. Fazokas – 9:32
12:00 – Xing Lixue	1–2
	1–3	J. Pesendorfer – 15:45
	1–4	S. Volgger (A. Matzka) (PP) – 39:21
	1–5	A. Hanser (A. Fazokas, A. Matzka) (PP2) – 48:00
	1–6	J. Pesendorfer (PP) – 48:43
	1–7	J. Pesendorfer (B. Peer) – 53:31

10 min
Penalties
4 min
23
Shots
53

18 March 2014; 16:30	Poland	2 – 1 GWS (0–0, 1–0, 0–1) (OT: 0–0) (SO: 2–1)	Italy	Krynica Ice Stadium, Krynica-Zdrój; Attendance: 421

Game reference
Katarzyna Fijol	Goalies	Eugenia Pompanin	Referee: (Hungary) Katalin Gernyi; Linesmen: (Latvia) Jana Gerkena (United Kingdom) Amy Lack
38:56 – (PP) K. Wieczorek / 1–0; / 1–1 / C. Rossi (V. Avanzi) – 51:46			Referee: (Hungary) Katalin Gernyi; Linesmen: (Latvia) Jana Gerkena (United Kingdom) Amy Lack
K. Chrapek; (miss) A. Cygan; K. Wieczorek	Shootout	C. Rossi; T. Wild (miss); G. Speranza (miss)	Referee: (Hungary) Katalin Gernyi; Linesmen: (Latvia) Jana Gerkena (United Kingdom) Amy Lack
10 min	Penalties	20 min	Referee: (Hungary) Katalin Gernyi; Linesmen: (Latvia) Jana Gerkena (United Kingdom) Amy Lack
43	Shots	45	Referee: (Hungary) Katalin Gernyi; Linesmen: (Latvia) Jana Gerkena (United Kingdom) Amy Lack

19 March 2014; 16:30	Kazakhstan	1 – 4 (0–2, 0–1, 1–1)	Poland	Krynica Ice Stadium, Krynica-Zdrój; Attendance: 315

Game reference

Tatyana Mozhayeva
Goalies
Katarzyna Fijol
Referee:
(Finland) Maija Kontturi
Linesmen:
(Norway) Rita Rygh
(Hungary) Zsuzsanna Sandor

	0–1	K. Wieczorek (A. Dziedzioch, J. Orawska) – 2:14
	0–2	K. Wieczorek – 5:26
	0–3	J. Gawlik (O. Tomczok) – 27:38
42:40 – E. Bogdashova	1–3
	1–4	K. Wieczorek (J. Gawlik) – 59:15

12 min
Penalties
2 min
28
Shots
70

20 March 2014; 13:00	Italy	1 – 5 (0–1, 1–2, 0–2)	China	Krynica Ice Stadium, Krynica-Zdrój; Attendance: 56

Game reference

Eugenia Pompanin
Goalies
Liu Yuchan
Referee:
(Finland) Maija Kontturi
Linesmen:
(United Kingdom) Amy Lack
(Poland) Joanna Pobozniak

	0–1	R. Zhu (C. Zhang) – 3:50
	0–2	W. Wang – 22:33
27:10 – G. Speranza	1–2
	1–3	X. He (SH) – 37:26
	1–4	Q. Zhao (S. Lu) (PP) – 50:22
	1–5	C. Zhang (R. Zhu) – 53:15

10 min
Penalties
6 min
22
Shots
37

20 March 2014; 16:30	Austria	8 – 1 (3–0, 2–1, 3–0)	Kazakhstan	Krynica Ice Stadium, Krynica-Zdrój; Attendance: 98

Game reference

Hanna Schertler
Goalies
Tatyana Mozhayeva
Referee:
(Hungary) Katalin Gernyi
Linesmen:
(Latvia) Jana Gerkena
(Hungary) Zsuzsanna Sandor

6:52 – (PP) J. Pesendorfer (M. Korotaj, N. Hammerle)	1–0
14:27 – (PP2) B. Peer (A. Hanser)	2–0
18:59 – (PP) A. Fazokas (A. Hanser)	3–0
28:38 – B. Peer (A. Fazokas)	4–0
31:10 – S. Volgger	5–0
	5–1	K.Felzink (X. Bushuyeva) – 37:55
44:19 – S. Volgger	6–1
50:58 – (PP) A. Matzka (A. Hanser)	7–1
58:22 – B. Peer (A. Fazokas)	8–1

8 min
Penalties
16 min
104
Shots
18

21 March 2014; 16:30	Poland	1 – 3 (1–1, 0–1, 0–1)	Austria	Krynica Ice Stadium, Krynica-Zdrój; Attendance: 523

Game reference

Katarzyna Fijol
Goalies
Nina Prunster
Referee:
(Russia) Elena Ivanova
Linesmen:
(Switzerland) Magali Anex
(Norway) Rita Rygh

	0–1	P. Astl (J. Schneeberger) – 8:31
18:57 – K. Wieczorek	1–1
	1–2	A. Fazokas – 24:35
	1–3	A. Hanser (SH) – 54:00

16 min
Penalties
26 min
38
Shots
51

22 March 2014; 13:00	Italy	3 – 2 OT (0–2, 2–0, 0–0) (OT: 1–0)	Kazakhstan	Krynica Ice Stadium, Krynica-Zdrój; Attendance: 73

Game reference

Eugenia Pompanin
Goalies
Tatyana Mozhayeva
Referee:
(Russia) Elena Ivanova
Linesmen:
(Poland) Joanna Pobozniak
(Hungary) Zsuzsanna Sandor

	0–1	V. Sidorenko (M. Tursynova) (PP) – 13:15
	0–2	N. Filimonova (T. Likhaus) – 17:18
31:23 – C. Rossi (G. Battisti)	1–2
37:27 – F. Galtieri (G. Battisti)	2–2
61:06 – (PP) F. Galtieri (N. Zaccherini)	3–2

16 min
Penalties
10 min
40
Shots
33

22 March 2014; 16:30	China	3 – 6 (2–2, 0–1, 1–3)	Poland	Krynica Ice Stadium, Krynica-Zdrój; Attendance: 315

Game reference

Liu Yuchan
Goalies
Katarzyna Fijol
Referee:
(Finland) Maija Kontturi
Linesmen:
(Switzerland) Magali Anex
(United Kingdom) Amy Lack

	0–1	A. Cygan (K. Wieczorek) – 1:05
13:26 – Q. Zhao (K. Fu)	1–1
15:17 – L. Xing (W. Wang)	2–1
	2–2	K. Wieczorek – 19:58
	2–3	D. Szelag (K. Szewczyk) – 29:16
45:40 – (PP) C. Zhang (Y. Hou, Q. Zhao)	3–3
	3–4	K. Wieczorek – 48:18
	3–5	A. Cygan (K. Wieczorek, M. Metyk) – 55:26
	3–6	K. Wieczorek – 58:29

4 min
Penalties
8 min
36
Shots
49

23 March 2014; 13:00	Austria	3 – 0 (1–0, 1–0, 1–0)	Italy	Krynica Ice Stadium, Krynica-Zdrój; Attendance: 85

Game reference

Nina Prunster
Goalies
Eugenia Pompanin
Referee:
(Finland) Maija Kontturi
Linesmen:
(Norway) Rita Rygh
(Hungary) Zsuzsanna Sandor

1:00 – J. Pesendorfer (N. Hammerle)	1–0
36:54 – (SH) A. Hanser	2–0
50:23 – (PP) A. Johann (A. Fazokas, A. Hanser)	3–0

6 min
Penalties
10 min
50
Shots
24

23 March 2014; 16:30	Kazakhstan	1 – 2 GWS (0–0, 0–1, 1–0) (OT: 0–0) (SO: 0–1)	China	Krynica Ice Stadium, Krynica-Zdrój; Attendance: 56

Game reference
Tatyana Mozhayeva	Goalies	Liu Yuchan	Referee: (Hungary) Katalin Gernyi; Linesmen: (Latvia) Jana Gerkena (Poland) Joanna Pobozniak
/ 0–1 / C. Zhang (R. Zhu) – 29:29; 44:47 – K. Felzink (A. Olzhabayeva) / 1–1			Referee: (Hungary) Katalin Gernyi; Linesmen: (Latvia) Jana Gerkena (Poland) Joanna Pobozniak
(miss) E. Ramazanova; (miss) X. Bushuyeva; (miss) M. Aldabergenova	Shootout	R. Zhu (miss); C. Zhang; X. He (miss)	Referee: (Hungary) Katalin Gernyi; Linesmen: (Latvia) Jana Gerkena (Poland) Joanna Pobozniak
6 min	Penalties	8 min	Referee: (Hungary) Katalin Gernyi; Linesmen: (Latvia) Jana Gerkena (Poland) Joanna Pobozniak
18	Shots	41	Referee: (Hungary) Katalin Gernyi; Linesmen: (Latvia) Jana Gerkena (Poland) Joanna Pobozniak
