= Jouanny =

Jouanny is a French surname. Notable people with the surname include:

- Betty Jouanny (born 1992), French ice hockey player
- Bruce Jouanny (born 1978), French racing driver
- Florian Jouanny (born 1992), French para-cyclist
