= 2015 IIHF U18 Women's World Championship Division I =

2015 IIHF World Women's U18 Championship Division I

Tournament details
- Host countries: France; Poland
- Venues: 2 (in 2 host cities)
- Dates: 4 – 10 January 2015; 19 – 25 January 2015
- Teams: 12

The 2015 IIHF U18 Women's World Championship Division I was the two international under-18 women ice hockey tournaments organised by the International Ice Hockey Federation. The Division I 'A' and Division I Qualification tournaments represent the second and the third tier of the IIHF World Women's U18 Championships.

== Division I 'A' ==
The Division I 'A' tournament was played in Vaujany, France, from 4 to 10 January 2015.

=== Final standings ===
Team	Pld	W	OTW	OTL	L	GF	GA	GD	Pts	Promotion or relegation
France	5	4	1	0	0	21	9	+12	14	Promoted to the 2016 Top Division
Norway	5	3	1	1	0	14	9	+5	12	
Slovakia	5	2	0	1	2	18	24	−6	7	
Germany	5	2	0	0	3	20	15	+5	6	
Hungary	5	2	0	0	3	10	13	−3	6	
Austria	5	0	0	0	5	6	19	−13	0	Relegated to the 2016 Division I Qualification

Source: IIHF

=== Results ===
All times are local. (CET – UTC+1)

4 January 2015; 12:00	Austria	0 – 2 (0-0, 0-1, 0-1)	Hungary	Vaujany Arena, Vaujany; Attendance: 70

Game reference

4 January 2015; 15:30	Norway	1 – 2 GWS (0-0, 1-1, 0-0) (0-0, 0-1)	France	Vaujany Arena, Vaujany; Attendance: 422

Game reference

4 January 2015; 19:00	Slovakia	7 – 3 (1-1, 3-0, 3-2)	Germany	Vaujany Arena, Vaujany; Attendance: 95

Game reference

5 January 2015; 15:30	Hungary	0 – 3 (0-0, 0-1, 0-2)	Norway	Vaujany Arena, Vaujany; Attendance: 114

Game reference

5 January 2015; 19:00	France	8 – 3 (2-0, 3-1, 3-2)	Slovakia	Vaujany Arena, Vaujany; Attendance: 438

Game reference

6 January 2015; 19:00	Germany	6 – 2 (1-1, 4-0, 1-1)	Austria	Vaujany Arena, Vaujany; Attendance: 264

Game reference

7 January 2015; 12:00	Hungary	7 – 1 (3-1, 2-0, 2-0)	Slovakia	Vaujany Arena, Vaujany; Attendance: 40

Game reference

7 January 2015; 15:30	Austria	2 – 3 (2-0, 0-0, 0-3)	Norway	Vaujany Arena, Vaujany; Attendance: 74

Game reference

7 January 2015; 19:00	France	4 – 3 (2-0, 1-1, 1-2)	Germany	Vaujany Arena, Vaujany; Attendance: 479

Game reference

8 January 2015; 14:00	Norway	5 – 4 GWS (1-1, 2-2, 1-1) (0-0, 1-0)	Slovakia	Vaujany Arena, Vaujany; Attendance: 173

Game reference

9 January 2015; 15:30	Germany	7 – 0 (1-0, 3-0, 3-0)	Hungary	Vaujany Arena, Vaujany; Attendance: 182

Game reference

9 January 2015; 19:00	France	5 – 1 (3-0, 0-0, 2-1)	Austria	Vaujany Arena, Vaujany; Attendance: 726

Game reference

10 January 2015; 12:00	Germany	1 – 2 (0-0, 0-1, 1-1)	Norway	Vaujany Arena, Vaujany; Attendance: 172

Game reference

10 January 2015; 15:30	Slovakia	3 – 1 (1-0, 2-1, 0-0)	Austria	Vaujany Arena, Vaujany; Attendance: 187

Game reference

10 January 2015; 19:00	Hungary	1 – 2 (1-0, 0-1, 0-1)	France	Vaujany Arena, Vaujany; Attendance: 730

Game reference

=== Tournament awards ===
Best players selected by the directorate:

Best Goalkeeper	(Norway) Emilie Kristiansen
Best Defenseman	(Slovakia) Lenka Čurmová
Best Forward	(France) Estelle Duvin

== Division I Qualification ==
The Division I Qualification tournament was played in Katowice, Poland, from 19 to 25 January 2015. Denmark won all five games in their debut, earning promotion to the Division I 'A' tournament for 2016.

=== Final standings ===
Team	Pld	W	OTW	OTL	L	GF	GA	GD	Pts	Promotion
Denmark	5	5	0	0	0	29	2	+27	15	Promoted to the 2016 Division I
Italy	5	4	0	0	1	11	8	+3	12	
Poland	5	3	0	0	2	21	12	+9	9	
Kazakhstan	5	1	1	0	3	6	14	−8	5	
China	5	1	0	1	3	3	19	−16	4	
Great Britain	5	0	0	0	5	3	18	−15	0	

Source: IIHF

=== Results ===
All times are local. (CET – UTC+1)

19 January 2015; 13:00	Kazakhstan	2 – 1 GWS (1-0, 0-1, 0-0) (0-0, 1-0)	China	Spodek Arena, Katowice; Attendance: 100

Game reference

19 January 2015; 16:30	Denmark	9 – 0 (2-0, 4-0, 3-0)	Great Britain	Spodek Arena, Katowice; Attendance: 100

Game reference

19 January 2015; 20:00	Italy	5 – 1 (4-1, 1-0, 0-0)	Poland	Spodek Arena, Katowice; Attendance: 300

Game reference

21 January 2015; 13:00	Great Britain	0 – 1 (0-1, 0-0, 0-0)	Italy	Spodek Arena, Katowice; Attendance: 100

Game reference

21 January 2015; 16:30	China	0 – 5 (0-3, 0-0, 0-2)	Denmark	Spodek Arena, Katowice; Attendance: 120

Game reference

21 January 2015; 20:00	Poland	6 – 1 (3-0, 0-1, 3-0)	Kazakhstan	Spodek Arena, Katowice; Attendance: 310

Game reference

22 January 2015; 13:00	Denmark	6 – 1 (2-1, 0-0, 4-0)	Italy	Spodek Arena, Katowice; Attendance: 50

Game reference

22 January 2015; 16:30	Poland	9 – 0 (4-0, 3-0, 2-0)	China	Spodek Arena, Katowice; Attendance: 110

Game reference

22 January 2015; 20:00	Great Britain	1 – 2 (0-0, 1-0, 0-2)	Kazakhstan	Spodek Arena, Katowice; Attendance: 40

Game reference

24 January 2015; 13:00	Italy	2 – 1 (0-0, 1-1, 1-0)	Kazakhstan	Spodek Arena, Katowice; Attendance: 50

Game reference

24 January 2015; 16:30	China	2 – 1 (0-0, 1-1, 1-0)	Great Britain	Spodek Arena, Katowice; Attendance: 60

Game reference

24 January 2015; 20:00	Poland	1 – 5 (1-0, 0-2, 0-3)	Denmark	Spodek Arena, Katowice; Attendance: 500

Game reference

25 January 2015; 13:00	China	0 – 2 (0-0, 0-1, 0-1)	Italy	Spodek Arena, Katowice; Attendance: 50

Game reference

25 January 2015; 16:30	Great Britain	1 – 4 (1-2, 0-2, 0-0)	Poland	Spodek Arena, Katowice; Attendance: 350

Game reference

25 January 2015; 20:00	Kazakhstan	0 – 4 (0-1, 0-0, 0-3)	Denmark	Spodek Arena, Katowice; Attendance: 60

Game reference
