= Slovakia women's national under-18 ice hockey team =

Slovak national women's ice hockey team

Slovakia
- The Coat of arms of Slovakia is the badge used on the players jerseys.
- Nickname: Repre; SR Ženy 18
- Association: Slovak Ice Hockey Federation
- General manager: Edita Petrusová (2025)
- Head coach: Michal Kobezda (2025)
- Assistants: Nicol Lucák Čupková; Adam Políček
- Captain: Ema Lacková (2025)
- Most games: Andrea Kollová (25); Petronela Novotná (25)
- Top scorer: Nela Lopušanová (16)
- Most points: Nela Lopušanová (26)
- Team colors
- IIHF code: SVK
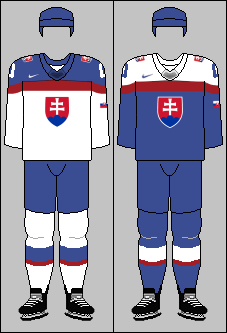

First international
- France 2–1 (SO) Slovakia (Chambéry, France; 28 December 2008)

Biggest win
- Slovakia 10–0 Kazakhstan (Dumfries, Scotland, United Kingdom; 29 October 2012)

Biggest defeat
- United States 13–0 Slovakia (Membertou, Canada; 10 January 2026)

IIHF World Women's U18 Championships
- Appearances: 13 (first in 2009)
- Best result: 6th (first in 2022)

International record (W–L–T)
- 28–26–0

The Slovak women's national under 18 ice hockey team (Slovak: Slovenská ženská hokejová reprezentácia do 18 rokov) is the national under-18 ice hockey team of Slovakia. The team represents Slovakia at the International Ice Hockey Federation's Ice Hockey U18 Women's World Championship.

== U18 Women's World Championship record ==
Year	GP	W	L	GF	GA	Pts	Rank
2009	4	2	2*	11	14	7	11th place (3rd in Division I)
2010	5	3	2	17	9	9	11th place (3rd in Division I)
2011	5	4	1	19	11	12	10th place (2nd in Division I)
2012	5	0	5	5	29	0	14th place (6th in Division I)
2013	10	5	5	35	23	15	13th place (5th in Division I)
2014	5	1	4*	7	10	4	13th place (5th in Division I)
2015	5	2	3*	18	24	7	11th place (3rd in Division I)
2016	5	3	2*	18	9	10	11th place (3rd in Division I)
2017	5	4	1	17	6	12	10th place (2nd in Division I Group A)
2018	5	4^	1	18	11	11	10th place (2nd in Division I Group A)
2019	5	4	1	14	9	12	9th place (1st in Division I Group A)
2020	5	1^	4	8	17	2	8th place
~~2021~~	Cancelled due to the COVID-19 pandemic						
2022	5	1	4	8	20	3	6th place
2023	5	2	3	17	20	6	6th place
2024	5	1^	4	7	20	2	6th place
2025	5	1	4	14	27	3	7th place

*Includes one loss in overtime (in the round robin)
^Includes one win in overtime (in the round robin)

== Team ==
=== Current roster ===
Roster for the 2026 IIHF U18 Women's World Championship.

Head coach: Michal Kobezda
Assistant coach: Nicol Lucák Čupková
Goaltender coach: Adam Políček

No.	Pos.	Name	Height	Weight	Birthdate	Team
1	G	Zuzana Tomečková	1.72 m (5 ft 8 in)	60 kg (130 lb)	19 June 2008 (age 18)	(Slovakia) MHK Martin
2	G	Sofia Hajnalová	1.64 m (5 ft 5 in)	77 kg (170 lb)	8 October 2010 (age 16)	(Slovakia) ŽHKm Zvolen
5	D	Dorota Kubánová	1.59 m (5 ft 3 in)	62 kg (137 lb)	23 September 2009 (age 17)	(Slovakia) MHK Dolný Kubín
6	D	Tamara Rošková	1.63 m (5 ft 4 in)	68 kg (150 lb)	4 May 2011 (age 15)	(Slovakia) HK Brezno
7	F	Dominika Miškovičová	1.60 m (5 ft 3 in)	65 kg (143 lb)	23 May 2009 (age 17)	(Slovakia) ŽHKm Zvolen
8	D	Lilly Laura Lipnická	1.65 m (5 ft 5 in)	59 kg (130 lb)	13 April 2009 (age 17)	(Slovakia) ŽHK 2000 Šarišanka Prešov
9	D	Nina Cellárová	1.65 m (5 ft 5 in)	59 kg (130 lb)	9 September 2009 (age 17)	(Canada) Ontario Hockey Academy
10	F	Nina Ševčíková	1.60 m (5 ft 3 in)	63 kg (139 lb)	4 June 2009 (age 17)	(Slovakia) ŽHK Poprad
11	D	Michaela Letaši	1.68 m (5 ft 6 in)	61 kg (134 lb)	5 December 2009 (age 16)	(Canada) Ontario Hockey Academy
12	F	Nela Lopušanová (C)	1.71 m (5 ft 7 in)	75 kg (165 lb)	26 February 2008 (age 18)	(United States) Bishop Kearney Selects
13	F	Lenka Karkošková	1.58 m (5 ft 2 in)	57 kg (126 lb)	15 April 2008 (age 18)	(Slovakia) HK PSRŽ Bratislava
15	D	Lucia Luptáková	1.69 m (5 ft 7 in)	68 kg (150 lb)	23 May 2010 (age 16)	(Canada) Bourget College Prep
16	D	Nina Rostecká	1.58 m (5 ft 2 in)	67 kg (148 lb)	8 April 2010 (age 16)	(Slovakia) HC Slovan Bratislava
17	F	Alexandra Hirjaková	1.70 m (5 ft 7 in)	63 kg (139 lb)	30 May 2009 (age 17)	(Slovakia) HK PSRŽ Bratislava
18	F	Natália Gerö	1.68 m (5 ft 6 in)	68 kg (150 lb)	30 November 2009 (age 16)	(Slovakia) Barani Banská Bystrica
19	F	Nikita Lilliana Krištofíková	1.70 m (5 ft 7 in)	69 kg (152 lb)	25 November 2008 (age 17)	(Sweden) Södertälje SK
20	F	Lucia Lipčáková	1.66 m (5 ft 5 in)	65 kg (143 lb)	8 October 2011 (age 15)	(Slovakia) ŽHK 2000 Šarišanka Prešov
21	F	Emma Plvanová	1.72 m (5 ft 8 in)	62 kg (137 lb)	14 September 2009 (age 17)	(Slovakia) HC Slovan Bratislava
22	F	Lívia Nogová	1.73 m (5 ft 8 in)	69 kg (152 lb)	29 May 2008 (age 18)	(Slovakia) MHK Martin
23	F	Vanesa Mikulášiková	1.70 m (5 ft 7 in)	70 kg (150 lb)	9 January 2008 (age 18)	(Slovakia) ŽHKm Zvolen
24	D	Gréta Konrádová	1.69 m (5 ft 7 in)	74 kg (163 lb)	11 September 2009 (age 17)	(Slovakia) HC Slovan Bratislava
28	F	Alica Juríková	1.75 m (5 ft 9 in)	70 kg (150 lb)	10 October 2008 (age 18)	(Slovakia) HK Levice
30	G	Mariana Sumegová	1.78 m (5 ft 10 in)	72 kg (159 lb)	9 February 2008 (age 18)	(Canada) Bourget College Volts U18

Team biometrics

- Average age: 16
- Average height: 1.67 m (5 ft 6 in)
- Average weight: 66 kg (146 lb)

=== Head coaches ===
- Miroslav Karafiát, 2008–09
- Igor Andrejkovič, 2009–10
- Stanislav Kubuš, 2010–2012
- Ján Valúch, 2012–2015
- Tomáš Pšenka, 2015–16
- Peter Kúdelka, 2016–2020
- Gabriela Sabolová, 2021–22
- Miroslav Mosnár, 2022–23
- Gabriela Sabolová, 2023–24
- Michal Kobezda, 2024–

=== World Championship player awards ===
Best Forward
Selected by the tournament directorate

- 2023: Nela Lopušanová

Most Valuable Player
Selected by the media

- 2023: Nela Lopušanová (F)
- 2025: Nela Lopušanová (F)

All-Star Team
Selected by the media

- 2023: Nela Lopušanová (F)
- 2025: Nela Lopušanová (F)

Top-3 Players on Team
Selected by the coaches

- 2020: Romana Halušková (F), Júlia Matejková (F), Sofia Vysokajová (D)
- 2022: Nikola Janeková (D), Barbora Kapičáková (F), Laura Medviďová (G)
- 2023: Tatiana Blichová (F), Zuzana Dobiašová (F), Nela Lopušanová (F)
- 2024: Lilien Beňáková (F), Lívia Debnárová (G), Michaela Paulínyová (F))
- 2025: Nela Lopušanová (F), Mariana Sumegová (G), Ema Tóthová (F)

==== Division 1A player awards ====
Best Defenceman
Selected by the tournament directorate

- 2019: Diana Vargová

Best Player on Team
Selected by the coaches

- 2017: Tatiana Ištocyová (D)
- 2018: Lívia Kúbeková (D)
- 2019: Diana Vargová (D)

==== Division 1 player awards ====
Best Defenceman
Selected by the tournament directorate

- 2015: Lenka Čurmová
- 2016: Tatiana Ištocyová

Best Goalkeeper
Selected by the tournament directorate

- 2010: Jana Budajová
- 2011: Romana Kiapešová

Best Player on Team
Selected by the coaches

- 2009: Nicol Čupková (F)
- 2011: Romana Kiapešová (G)
- 2012: Nikola Kaliská (F)
- 2013: Oľga Jablonovská (G)
- 2014: Iveta Klimášová (F)
- 2015: Andrea Kollová (F)
- 2016: Adriána Štofanková (G)

== See also ==
- Slovakia women's national ice hockey team
- European Women's Hockey League
