= Andrea Kiss =

Hungarian ice hockey player

- Born: 4 December 1996 (age 29)
- Height: 163 cm (5 ft 4 in)
- Weight: 55 kg (121 lb; 8 st 9 lb)
- Position: Forward
- Shoots: Left
- EWHL team Former teams: MAC Budapest; MAC/FTC Budapest; Óbudai HA Budapest; SC Weinfelden; Marilyn Budapest; KMH Budapest
- Current DEBL coach: MAC Marilyn Budapest
- National team: Hungary
- Playing career: 2012–present
- Coaching career: 2021–present

Andrea Kiss (born 7 November 1995) is a Hungarian ice hockey player and coach, currently playing in the European Women's Hockey League (EWHL) with the women's team of MAC Budapest and serving as head coach to MAC Marilyn Budapest in the Austrian Women's Ice Hockey Bundesliga (DEBL). During her career with the Hungarian national ice hockey team, which spanned from 2011 to 2021, she participated in nine IIHF Women's World Championship tournaments, including the Top Division tournament in 2021.

== Career statistics ==
=== International ===
Year	Team	Event	Result	GP	G	A	Pts	PIM
2011	Hungary U18	WW18 D1Q	1st	5	1	3	4	2
2012	Hungary U18	WW18 D1	1st	5	4	2	6	0
2012	Hungary	WW D2A	2nd	5	0	1	1	2
2012	Hungary	OGQ	DNQ	3	0	2	2	2
2013	Hungary U18	WW18	6th	5	0	0	0	4
2013	Hungary	WW D2A	1st	5	2	2	4	2
2014	Hungary U18	WW18	8th	5	0	0	0	2
2014	Hungary	WW D1B	3rd	5	1	2	3	2
2015	Hungary	WW D1B	4th	5	0	0	0	12
2016	Hungary	WW D1B	1st	4	1	2	3	2
2016	Hungary	OGQ	DNQ	3	1	1	2	0
2017	Hungary	WW D1A	5th	5	0	0	0	2
2018	Hungary	WW D1A	3rd	5	1	1	2	4
2019	Hungary	WW D1A	1st	5	0	0	0	4
2021	Hungary	WW	9th	4	0	0	0	4
Junior totals				20	5	5	10	10
Senior totals				43	5	8	13	34
