= Nicol Čupková =

Slovak ice hockey player and coach (born 1992)

Nicol Lucák Čupková
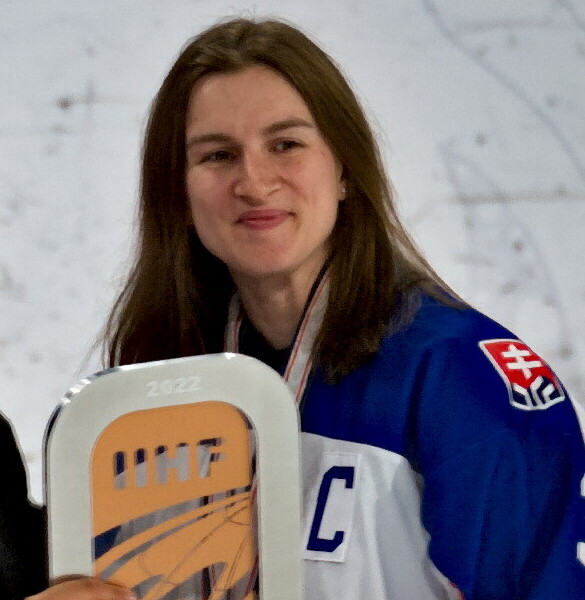
- Lucák Čupková representing Slovakia at the 2022 IIHF World Championship D1A
- Born: 4 November 1992 (age 33) Košice, Czechoslovakia
- Height: 174 cm (5 ft 9 in)
- Weight: 58 kg (128 lb; 9 st 2 lb)
- Position: Forward
- Shot: Left
- Played for: ŽHK Michalovce; Agidel Ufa; HC Slovan Bratislava; Popradské Líšky; ŽHK Šarišanka Prešov
- Current coach: Slovakia U18
- Coached for: Slovakia U16
- National team: Slovakia
- Playing career: 2004–2023
- Coaching career: 2022–present

Nicol Lucák Čupková (born 4 November 1992) is a Slovak ice hockey forward and assistant coach to the Slovak national under-18 team. As a member of the Slovak national ice hockey team, she represented Slovakia at the 2010 Winter Olympics and at six IIHF Women's World Championship tournaments.

== Playing career ==
Lucák Čupková made her senior club debut with ŽHK Šarišanka Prešov in the 2004–05 season of the Slovak Women's Extraliga. She played with ŽHK Šarišanka Prešov through the 2007–08 season, with the exception of fourteen games spent with the Popradské Líšky (lit. 'Poprad Foxes') during the 2006–07 Slovak Women's Extraliga season.

In 2008, she joined the women's team of HC Slovan Bratislava, which played the 2008–09 season in both the Slovak Women's Extraliga and the Elite Women's Hockey League (EWHL). After playing five games of her fourth EWHL season with HC Slovan Bratislava, she signed with Agidel Ufa in the Russian Women's Hockey League (RWHL; replaced by the Zhenskaya Hockey League (ZhHL) in 2015).

Lucák Čupková went on to play nearly eleven seasons with Agidel, during which she was a three-time ZhHL Champion (2018, 2019, 2021). She ranked second on the team for scoring in more than half of her seasons with Agidel and was twice named to the ZhHL All Star Game. After playing 23 games of the 2021–22 season, she left the team in early March, shortly after the Russian invasion of Ukraine began.

Her coaching career began in 2022 and she has not played a full season since 2020–21. In two games with ŽHK Michalovce during the 2022–23 Slovak Women's Extraliga season, Lucák Čupková tallied two goals and six points.

== International play ==
As a junior player with the Slovak national under-18 team, Lucák Čupková competed in two IIHF World Women's U18 Championships, winning Division I bronze medals in the 2009 and 2010. She earned recognition as the top scorer of the 2009 tournament.

Lucák Čupková represented Slovakia in the women's ice hockey tournament at the 2010 Winter Olympics in Vancouver. She played in all five games and tied for the team lead in scoring with three points. She also played in all three games of the 2010 Olympic qualification tournament.

Lucák Čupková also represented Slovakia at six IIHF Women's World Championships across two divisions. Her first appearance came in 2009. She appeared at the Top Division championships in 2011 and 2012.

== Personal life ==
Lucák Čupková is married to Jan Lucák, an ice hockey coach in the Czech national team system.

== Career statistics ==
=== International ===
Year	Team	Event	Result	GP	G	A	Pts	PIM
2008	Slovakia	OG Q	Q	3	0	0	0	2
2009	Slovakia U18	WC18 D1	3rd	4	4	2	6	10
2009	Slovakia	WC D1	1st	5	0	0	0	0
2010	Slovakia U18	WC18 D1	3rd	5	7	2	9	6
2010	Slovakia	OG	8th	5	1	2	3	0
2011	Slovakia	WC	7th	5	0	0	0	0
2012	Slovakia	WC	8th	5	3	3	6	2
2017	Slovakia	WC D1B	1st	5	7	4	11	4
2019	Slovakia	WC D1A	5th	5	0	2	2	2
2021	Slovakia	OG Q	DNQ	3	3	0	3	0
2022	Slovakia	WC D1A	3rd	4	0	2	2	2
Junior totals				9	11	4	15	16
Senior totals				30	14	13	27	12
