= Sabrina Zollinger =

Swiss ice hockey player (born 1993)

- Born: 27 March 1993 (age 33) Zürich, Switzerland
- Height: 1.65 m (5 ft 5 in)
- Weight: 65 kg (143 lb; 10 st 3 lb)
- Position: Defence
- Shoots: Left
- SWHL team Former teams: HV71; ZSC Lions; Rapperswil-Jona Lakers
- National team: Switzerland
- Playing career: 2008–present
Medal record
World Championships
Bronze medal – third place	2012 United States

Sabrina Zollinger (born 27 March 1993) is a Swiss ice hockey player for HV71.

== International career ==
Zollinger was selected for the Switzerland national women's ice hockey team in the 2010 Winter Olympics. She played in all five games, but did not record a point.

Zollinger has also appeared for Switzerland at four IIHF Women's World Championships. Her first appearance came in 2009. She was a member of the bronze medal winning team at the 2012 championships.

Zollinger made three appearances for the Switzerland women's national under-18 ice hockey team, at two levels of the IIHF World Women's U18 Championships. Her first came in 2009.

== Career statistics ==
=== Club ===
			Regular season					Playoffs
Season	Team	League	GP	G	A	Pts	PIM	GP	G	A	Pts	PIM
2007-08	ZSC Lions Frauen	SWHL A	5	0	2	2	10	3	2	0	2	0
2008-09	ZSC Lions Frauen	SWHL A	16	3	6	9	38	3	0	1	1	2
2009-10	ZSC Lions Frauen	SWHL A	5	4	1	5	10	2	0	0	0	0
2010-11	Rapperswil-Jona Lakers Damen	SWHL A	8	4	2	6	12	2	0	0	0	2
2011-12	ZSC Lions Frauen	SWHL A	7	1	3	4	6	6	2	7	9	8
2012-13	ZSC Lions Frauen	SWHL A	19	5	18	23	36	7	0	4	4	10
2013-14	ZSC Lions Frauen	SWHL A	13	8	10	18	10	5	2	0	2	12
2014-15	ZSC Lions Frauen	SWHL A	14	5	8	13	10	8	4	3	7	14
2015-16	ZSC Lions Frauen	SWHL A	17	8	9	17	14	6	2	1	3	14
2015-16	ZSC Lions Frauen	Swiss Women Cup	3	9	3	12	4	-	-	-	-	-
2016-17	ZSC Lions Frauen	SWHL A	13	7	9	16	8	6	0	4	4	2
2016-17	ZSC Lions Frauen	Swiss Women Cup	1	0	0	0	2	-	-	-	-	-
2017-18	HV71	SDHL	36	4	16	20	22	2	0	0	0	2
2018-19	HV71	SDHL	12	1	3	4	14	6	0	0	0	0
2019-20	HV71	SDHL	0	0	0	0	0	-	-	-	-	-
SWHL A totals			117	45	68	113	154	48	12	20	32	64
SDHL A totals			48	5	19	24	36	8	0	0	0	2

=== International ===
Year	Team	Event	GP	G	A	Pts	PIM
2009	Switzerland U18	WJC18	5	0	0	0	8
2009	Switzerland	WC	4	0	0	0	0
2010	Switzerland U18	WJC-18 D1	5	2	3	5	4
2010	Switzerland	OG	5	0	0	0	0
2011	Switzerland U18	WJC-18	6	4	2	6	12
2011	Switzerland	WC	5	0	1	1	10
2012	Switzerland	WC	6	0	1	1	2
2013	Switzerland	WC	5	0	0	0	6
2015	Switzerland	WC	4	0	0	0	4
2016	Switzerland	WC	5	0	0	0	8
2017	Switzerland	WC	6	0	0	0	8
2018	Switzerland	OG	6	1	0	1	6
2019	Switzerland	WC	4	0	0	0	4
Junior totals			16	6	5	11	24
WC totals			39	0	2	2	42
OG totals			11	1	0	1	6

== Honours and achievements ==
=== SWHL-A ===
- 2011-2012 : Champion with ZSC Lions Frauen
- 2012-2013 : Champion with ZSC Lions Frauen
- 2015-2016 : Champion with ZSC Lions Frauen
- 2016-2017 : Champion with ZSC Lions Frauen

=== Swiss Women Cup ===
- 2015-2016 : Cup Winner with ZSC Lions Frauen

=== WJC-18 ===
2010 : Gold Medal in D1 Division

=== WC ===
- 2012 : Bronze Medal
