= Bulbul Kartanbay =

Kazakh ice hockey player

Bulbul Kartanbay Булбул Картанбай
- Born: 30 July 1993 (age 32) Jambyl Region, Kazakhstan
- Height: 164 cm (5 ft 5 in)
- Weight: 60 kg (132 lb; 9 st 6 lb)
- Position: Forward
- Shoots: Left
- SWHL A team Former teams: Neuchâtel Hockey Academy: Tomyris Astana; PWHPA Independent; Metropolitan Riveters; Aisulu Almaty
- National team: Kazakhstan
- Playing career: 2011–present
- Website: Official website

Bulbul Kartanbay or Bulbul Kartanbayeva (Kazakh: Булбул Картанбай, Булбул Картанбаева; born 30 July 1993) is a Kazakh ice hockey forward and a member of the Kazakh national team, currently playing in the Swiss Women's League with Neuchâtel Hockey Academy. Kartanbay is the founder and owner of the first women’s ice hockey academy in Kazakhstan. She was the first player from Kazakhstan to play in the National Women's Hockey League (NWHL; renamed PHF in 2021) and to be affiliated with the Professional Women's Hockey Players Association (PWHPA).

== Playing career ==
Kartanbay was captain of Tomyris Astana in the Kazakh city of Astana (Nur-Sultan) before being drafted 15th overall by the Boston Blades in the 2017 CWHL Draft. In 2018, she moved to North America to tryout for the Calgary Inferno of the Canadian Women's Hockey League (CWHL). She signed her first North American contract with the NWHL's Metropolitan Riveters in 2019. After facing issues getting her visa processed – which delayed receipt of her pay until halfway through the season – she played just ten games with the Riveters before being sidelined due to a concussion sustained in a car accident.

In June 2020, Kartanbay was appointed one of the head coaches for the Princeton Tiger Lilies, an elite girls' minor and junior club in New Jersey. In September, it was announced that she was joining the New Hampshire section of the Professional Women's Hockey Players Association (PWHPA), though she ultimately became affiliated as an independent player rather than joining a regional section.

=== International ===
Kartanbay has played over 30 games for the senior Kazakh women's national team, first making the team as a teenager in 2012 and later serving as captain.

== Personal life ==
Kartanbay has a degree in tourism and hospitality from the International Information Technology University in Almaty. Outside of hockey, she owns a bakery. Also, Bulbul has her hockey brand "Kartanbay brand".

Bulbul was a finalist of "100 new faces of Kazakhstan" on 30 April 2021; "Forbes 30 under 30" 2021 - Sport.

She is a social entrepreneur, working on women's sports development in her country.

== Career statistics ==
			Regular season					Playoffs
Season	Team	League	GP	G	A	Pts	PIM	GP	G	A	Pts	PIM
2019-20	Metropolitan Riveters	NWHL	10	0	0	0	2	–	–	–	–	-–
NWHL totals			10	0	0	0	2	–	–	–	–	-–
