= 2009 IIHF World Women's U18 Championship Division I =

Tournament details
- Host country: France
- Venue: 1 (in 1 host city)
- Dates: 28 December 2008 – 2 January 2009
- Teams: 5

Tournament statistics
- Games played: 10
- Goals scored: 55 (5.5 per game)
- Scoring leader: Nicol Čupková (6 points)

The 2009 IIHF World Women's U18 Championship Division I tournament was held in Chambéry, France, from 28 December 2008 to 2 January 2009. This was the first junior female Division I ice hockey world championship in history.

== Final standings ==
Team	Pld	W	OTW	OTL	L	GF	GA	GD	Pts
Japan	4	4	0	0	0	18	5	+13	12
France	4	2	1	0	1	9	7	+2	8
Slovakia	4	2	0	1	1	11	14	−3	7
Austria	4	1	0	0	3	8	13	−5	3
Norway	4	0	0	0	4	9	16	−7	0

Source: IIHF

Japan is promoted to the Top Division of the 2010 IIHF World Women's U18 Championship.

== Results ==
All times are local (CET – UTC+01:00).

28 December 2008; 17:30	Austria	2–1 (1-0, 0-1, 1-0)	Norway	Buisson Rond Ice Rink, Chambéry

Game reference

28 December 2008; 21:00	France	2–1 GWS (1-0, 0-1, 0-0) (0-0, 1-0)	Slovakia	Buisson Rond Ice Rink, Chambéry

Game reference

29 December 2008; 21:00	Japan	3–1 (0-0, 1-1, 2-0)	Austria	Buisson Rond Ice Rink, Chambéry

Game reference

30 December 2008; 17:30	Slovakia	1–6 (1-0, 0-2, 0-4)	Japan	Buisson Rond Ice Rink, Chambéry

Game reference

30 December 2008; 21:00	France	3–2 (3-1, 0-0, 0-1)	Norway	Buisson Rond Ice Rink, Chambéry

Game reference

31 December 2008; 15:00	Slovakia	5–3 (0-1, 3-1, 2-1)	Austria	Buisson Rond Ice Rink, Chambéry

Game reference

01 January 2009; 14:30	Japan	7–3 (4-1, 2-1, 1-1)	Norway	Buisson Rond Ice Rink, Chambéry

Game reference

01 January 2009; 18:00	France	4–2 (2-1, 0-1, 2-0)	Austria	Buisson Rond Ice Rink, Chambéry

Game reference

02 January 2009; 17:30	Norway	3–4 (0-1, 3-1, 0-2)	Slovakia	Buisson Rond Ice Rink, Chambéry

Game reference

02 January 2009; 21:00	Japan	2–0 (0-0, 1-0, 1-0)	France	Buisson Rond Ice Rink, Chambéry

Game reference
