= Léa Villiot =

French ice hockey player (born 1997)

- Born: 11 February 1997 (age 29) Briançon, France
- Height: 1.65 m (5 ft 5 in)
- Weight: 60 kg (132 lb; 9 st 6 lb)
- Position: Defence
- Shoots: Left
- FFHG FÉ team Former teams: Remparts de Tours; Diables Rouges de Briançon; Pôle France Féminin
- National team: France
- Playing career: 2014–present

Léa Villiot (born 11 February 1997) is a French ice hockey player and member of the French national team. She plays in the FFHG Féminin Élite with the Remparts de Tours.

She represented France at the Top Division tournament of the IIHF Women's World Championship in 2019 IIHF Women's World Championship and at six Division I, Group A tournaments.
