= Nadine Hofstetter =

Swiss ice hockey player

- Born: 21 October 1994 (age 31) Romoos, Lucerne, Switzerland
- Height: 165 cm (5 ft 5 in)
- Weight: 65 kg (143 lb; 10 st 3 lb)
- Position: Defense
- Shoots: Left
- SWHL A team Former teams: SC Reinach; ZSC Lions; SC Rapperswil-Jona Lakers; KSC Küssnacht am Rigi
- National team: Switzerland
- Playing career: 2008–present

Nadine Hofstetter (born 21 October 1994) is a Swiss ice hockey player and member of the Swiss national ice hockey team, currently playing in the Women's League (SWHL A) with the SC Reinach Damen.

Hofstetter represented Switzerland at the 2021 IIHF Women's World Championship. As a junior player with the Swiss national under-18 team, she participated in the IIHF Women's U18 World Championships in 2010 (at the Division I level), 2011, and 2012.
