= International Information Technology University =

Coordinates: 43.23518°N 76.90994°E

International information technologies university
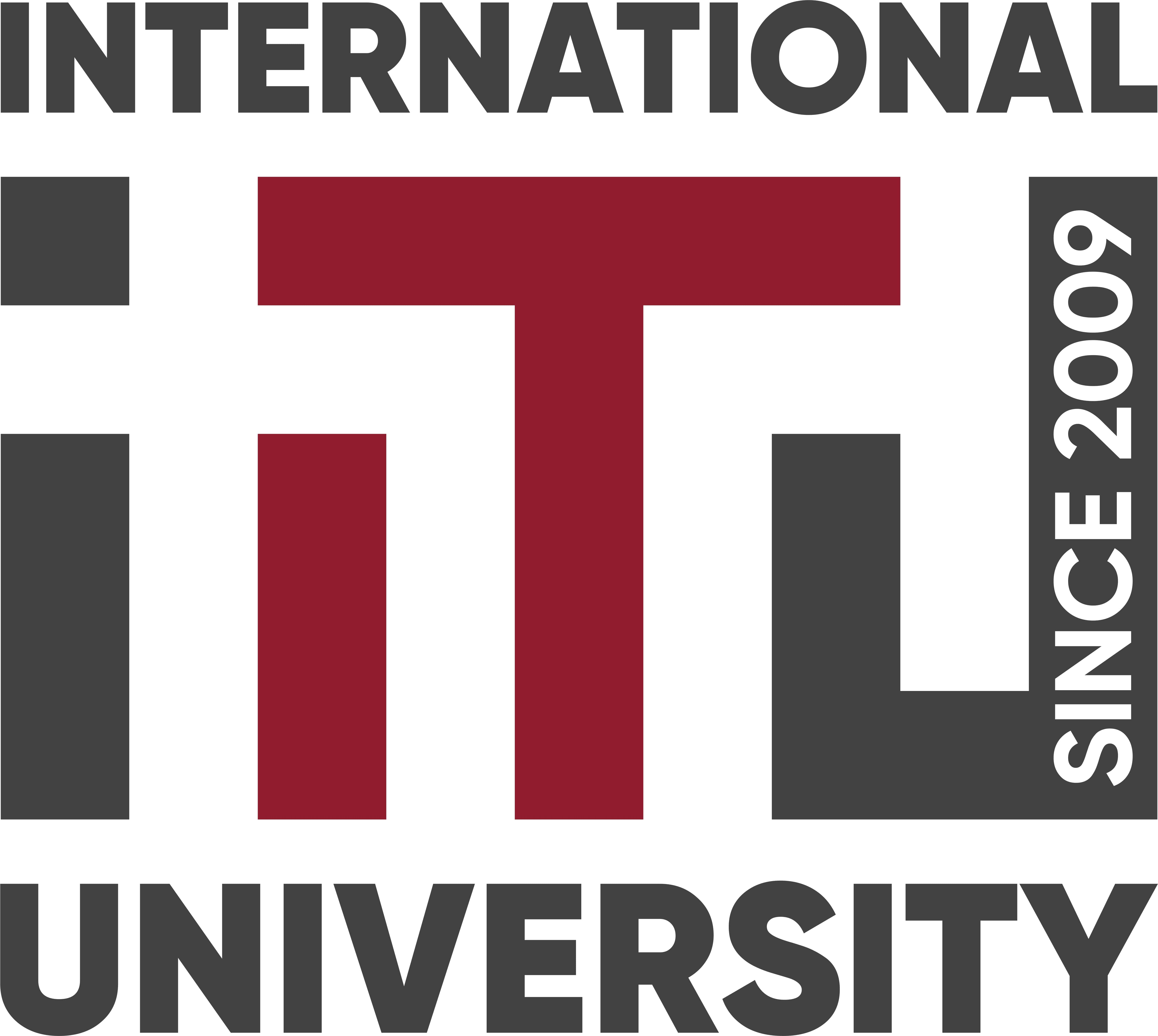
- Халықаралық ақпараттық технологиялар университеті Международный университет информационных технологий
- Motto: Intellectual Elite of Kazakhstan
- Type: Public
- Established: 2009
- President: Erlan Kenzhegalievich Sagadiyev
- Rector: Isakhov Asylbek Abdiashimovich
- Location: 050000—050063, Republic of Kazakhstan, Almaty, Manas street #34А
- Website: Official site of IITU DL system, Service Compiler, Olympiad

International IT University or International university of information technologies (Kazakh: Халықаралық ақпараттық технологиялар университеті, Halyqaralyq aqparattyq tehnologııalar ýnıversıteti) - established in close collaboration with educational organization iCarnegie which represents American IT university Carnegie Mellon in 2009 by order of President of Kazakhstan. Formation of the qualified, international recognized IT specialists in Kazakhstan became the purpose of creation of a higher educational institution of a similar profile. International IT University provided with grants from the government of Kazakhstan and national infocommunication companies, which cover disciplines by Kazakhstan and the U.S. educational systems.

Education at the university is conducted in English.

== Academic activities ==
=== Bachelor specialties ===
1. Information Systems
2. Computer Science and Software Engineering
3. Computer Science
4. Management in IT
5. Finance in IT
6. Electronic Journalism
7. Radio Engineering, Electronics and Telecommunications
8. Mathematical and Computer Modeling

=== Master's specialities ===
1. Information Systems
2. Computer Science and Software Engineering
3. Project Management
4. Mathematical and Computer Modeling

== iCarnegie courses ==
Education in International IT University goes by education programs of iCarnegie - branch enterprise of Carnegie Mellon

Course	Name of module	Qualifications after training
SSD1	Introduction to Information Systems	Web application developer
SSD2	Introduction to Computer Systems	Web support specialist
SSD3	Object Oriented Programming and Design	Junior Java Developer
SSD4	User Centered Design and Testing	User interface developer
SSD5	Data Structures and Algorithms	C++ programmer
SSD6	System-Level Programming	System Programmer
SSD7	Database Systems	Database systems developer
SSD8	Networks & Distributed Computing	Network application developer
SSD9	Software specification, test and maintenance	Senior developer
SSD10	Software projects organization and management	Software project manager

=== High School Program Courses ===
High School Program courses - training courses for applicant's basic knowledge of programming, the main objectives of which are:

- To teach applicants to program in Java
- To teach to use the modern approach of object-oriented programming (OOP)
- To teach to create applications with animations, sounds and control via the keyboard
- Provide certificates of iCarnegie, which will be considered for admission to IITU
- Provide an opportunity to work on interesting projects
- Provide an opportunity to learn from an Honorary Professor with the U.S. on international standards
- To teach how to create web-pages with games.

== International cooperation ==
International cooperation of university is carried by improving the training system in accordance with international standards, professional development of teaching staff, use of new technologies and leading practices in teaching and research activities through collaboration with foreign universities under direct contracts:

No.	Name	Date
1	Memorandum of Agreement with Arkansas State University	5 January 2011
2	Memorandum of Agreement with London Academy of Management Sciences	1 April 2011
3	Agreement with St. Petersburg State University of IT, Mechanics, and Optics	26 March 2010
4	Memorandum of Agreement with University Teknikal Mara SDN BHD	2 March 2010
5	Agreement with Transport and Telecommunication Institute	15 March 2010
6	Memorandum with Universiti Tenaga Nasional	March, 2010
7	Memorandum of Cooperation with Prague Development Center	22 December 2010
8	Memorandum with ALSI (Kazakhstan)	21 October 2009
9	Memorandum with Microsoft	12 November 2009
10	Memorandum with CISCO	12 November 2009
11	Agreement with Alatau IT City Management	24 September 2009
12	Memorandum with Orient Lab, Regional academy CISCO	21 October 2009
13	Memorandum with JSC NIT	16 July 2009
14	Memorandum with Graduate IT Systems Management School, Riga	15 September 2009
15	Agreement with iCarnegie	9 May 2009

== Laboratory ==
=== Huawei Cloud Computing of Innogrid ===
Huawei Cloud Computing of Innogrid - on August 9, 2011 was created the laboratory of open systems and cloud computing in close cooperation between Chinese company Huawei, ICT Holding "Zerde" and International IT University. The main purpose of the laboratory is focused on research in the fields cloud computing, open systems using the technology open source.

=== Apple Training Center ===
iOS Application Development - course introduces students to the programming language Objective-C and application development for mobile devices based on iOS. At the end of the course, students will be able to develop applications and programs in Objective-C for iPhone, iPad, and other iOS devices, as well as working in a development environment Xcode. The course includes an introduction to the language of Objective-C, the application of the concepts of object-oriented programming in the development of the language, study of the development paradigm of MVC, the work of the various components in the development environment Xcode. Before the start of the course the student should be familiar with object-oriented programming, be familiar with the syntax of C-like languages and have a basic knowledge of graphic design tools, compilers and debuggers.

Mac OS X Application development- course will teach students to develop applications for the operating system Mac OS X. At the end of the course the students will experience working with Cocoa Framework and Objective-C. Requires prior knowledge of programming language Objective-C. The course includes an overview of the platform and operating system, Mac OS X, the principles of designing application interfaces for personal computers.

Advanced Apple Development - course is designed for in-depth study of methods and means of developing applications based on Apple technology. The course includes a more detailed study of the language Objective-C, and additional third-party libraries, development environments XCode, the debugger works, methods of combining different languages and technologies with programs in Objective-C, frameworks WebKit, ParseKit, Cocoa, RestKit, writing web applications using Objective-C and XCode, architecture operating systems MacOS, Apple iOS, kernel Darwin, as well as the hardware architecture of devices Apple iPhone/iPad.

Microsoft Laboratory —

== Social projects and activities ==
Hackday Almaty 2011 - in 29–30 April 2011, in the walls of IITU was held IT-event Hackday. The event was attended by more than 500 master class listeners and 396 registered participants of the different projects in the IT sections and sections of Content and Media. In the event was announced 104 projects, of which 88 projects were submitted.

Hackday Almaty 2012 - in 28–29 April 2012, in the walls of IITU was held second IT-event Hackday 2012. In this year there were over 800 participants in different projects took part in the sections IT, Media and Content. In conjunction with IT-university partners of Hackday 2012 were:

- Michael Kechinov's studio
- Samsung
- YourVision
- Xit TV
- Microsoft
- DR Web
- Kivvi.kz
- Nur.kz
- namba.kz

== Management ==
- Rector - Uskenbaeva Raisa Kabievna
- Vice-Rector - Uskenbaeva Raisa Kabievna
- Director of Marketing and PR - Taykenova Mayrash Gomarovna

== University partners ==
:«Cisco Systems»

«Microsoft Corporation»

LUCT Worldwide

International Business Machines

Apple Inc.

== University anthem ==
Anthem of IITU

Шексіз білімге талпынатын
Жетті уақыт алтын
Кең қанат жайып шалқытатын
Ғылым есік ашты
Ашылып арманның жолы
Әлем тұр қызыққа толы
Болашағы жарқын бүл күй
Былым ордасы бұл IT

Chorus:

IT елімнің намысы менің
IT арманның жемісі сенің
IT алғашқы сәулесін шашқан
Көш басшы болатын жастар
IT сеніменен тек алға
IT болашаққа сен жалға
IT жеткізер толық арманға
Көгімде елімнің самға

We meet the world to take one step
The knowledge wait for you
Stream to the high of learning days
You'll see dreams coming true
Everything you need
You can find right here
Don't waste your time and just begin
To get your best in IT

IT - I can touch the sun I can fly
IT - you're the one, you're the brightest light
IT - thank for making me strong and wise
Thank you for being in my life
IT - it's the best way for everyone
IT - you're reliable you're number one
IT - you rise up leaders this is true
I'm so proud of learning with you

Yeah, yeah, клавиатуры, программы и нэт
индустрии надежной, полный букет,
Ваши фантазии - наш ратный труд
Нашему миру ясность и четкость дадут
English поможет быть впереди,
В сайтах есть все что ты хочешь найти
Вместе мы сможем всех обойти
Если ты - лучший, ты нужен в IT

IT - I can touch the sun I can fly
IT - you're the one, you're the brightest light
IT - thank for making me strong and wise
Thank you for being in my life
IT сеніменен тек алға
IT болашаққа сен жалға
IT жеткізер толық арманға
Көгімде елімнің самға
