= Morgane Rihet =

French ice hockey player

- Born: 14 April 1994 (age 30); Paris, France
- Height: 1.54 m (5 ft 1 in)
- Weight: 50 kg (110 lb; 7 st 12 lb)
- Position: Forward
- Shoots: Left
- CFHF team Former teams: SOC Hockey; Pôle France Féminin
- National team: France
- Playing career: 2012–present

Morgane Rihet (born 14 April 1994) is a French ice hockey player for SOC Hockey and the French national team.

She represented France at the 2019 IIHF Women's World Championship.
