= Iveta Klimášová =

Slovak ice hockey player

- Born: 14 January 1998 (age 27); Gelnica, Slovakia
- Height: 173 cm (5 ft 8 in)
- Position: Forward
- Shoots: Right
- SDHL team Former teams: AIK Hockey: HPK Hämeenlinna; Buffalo Beauts; MAC Budapest; SKP Bratislava; HC Spišská Nová Ves
- National team: Slovakia
- Playing career: 2011–present

Iveta Klimášová (born 14 January 1998) is a Slovak ice hockey player, currently playing in the Swedish Women's Hockey League (SDHL) with AIK Hockey. She was a member of the Slovak national ice hockey team during the 2010s.

Klimášová and national team teammate Lenka Čurmová were the first Slovak players to play in the North American Premier Hockey Federation (PHF; called NWHL until 2021).

She wears the number 8 as an homage to Alexander Ovechkin.
