= Jana Budajová =

Slovak ice hockey player

- Born: 16 November 1992 (age 33) Liptovský Mikuláš, Czechoslovakia
- Height: 5 ft 7 in (170 cm)
- Weight: 137 lb (62 kg; 9 st 11 lb)
- Position: Goaltender
- Catches: Left
- National team: Slovakia
- Playing career: 2010–present

Jana Budajová (born 16 November 1992 in Liptovský Mikuláš, Czechoslovakia) is a Slovak ice hockey goaltender.

== International career ==
Budajová was selected for the Slovakia national women's ice hockey team in the 2010 Winter Olympics, but did not play during the tournament.

Budajová also appeared for Slovakia at the 2012 IIHF Women's World Championship, but again, did not play.

She twice represented her country at junior level, playing for the Slovakia women's national under-18 ice hockey team. In 2009, she played in three games, winning two, and in 2010 she played in 4, winning the best goaltender award with a save percentage of 95.42%.

== International events ==
Year	Team	Event	GP	W	L	T	MIN	GA	SO	GAA	SV%
2009	Slovakia	U18	3	2	0	1	185	8	0	2.59	94.24
2010	Slovakia	U18	4	2	2	0	240	7	1	1.75	95.42
