= Betty Jouanny =

French ice hockey player (born 1992)

- Born: 4 January 1992 (age 34) Annecy, France
- Height: 1.59 m (5 ft 3 in)
- Weight: 55 kg (121 lb; 8 st 9 lb)
- Position: Forward
- Shoots: Left
- Played for: HC Fribourg-Gottéron; SC Langenthal; EV Bomo Thun; AIK IF; Leksands IF; Modo Hockey; Djurgårdens IF Hockey; Brynäs IF; Montreal Carabins
- National team: France
- Playing career: 2009–present

Betty Jouanny (born 4 January 1992) is a French ice hockey forward and member of the French national team. She was most recently active in the Swiss Women's League (PFWL) with HC Fribourg-Gottéron Ladies during the 2023–24 season.

== Playing career ==
Jouanny grew up in Chamonix, before leaving France to play and study at the Université de Montréal in Québec. In 2013, she moved to Sweden to sign with Brynäs IF in the Riksserien. She would play 147 with Brynäs, scoring 61 points.

After five seasons with Brynäs, she signed with Djurgårdens IF ahead of the 2018-19 SDHL season. It would prove to be a difficult season for her, however, as she struggled with recovering from two broken feet in her previous two seasons and barely saw any playing time with the club. By November 2018, she had decided to leave Djurgården, heading north to joinDamettan club Björklöven. After scoring 19 points in 7 games with Björklöven, she returned to the SDHL to join Modo Hockey's playoff run.

She spent the 2019-20 SDHL season with Leksands IF, putting up a career high 20 points in 36 games and scoring her first career SDHL playoff goal as the team was eliminated in the quarterfinals. She signed with AIK IF ahead of the 2020-21 season.

=== International ===
Jouanny made her French senior national debut at the IIHF World Championships Division I in 2009. In 2012, she joined the national team on a seven-game tour of Québec.

She scored 3 points in 3 games at the 2018 IIHF Women's World Championship Division I, hosted in France, as France earned promotion from Division IA. She represented France at the 2019 IIHF Women's World Championship, the country's first ever appearance at the top level of the IIHF Women's World Championships. She made her 200th appearance for France at the 2019 Worlds.

== Personal life ==
Jouanny has a bachelor's degree in kinesiology.
