= Norway women's national under-18 ice hockey team =

Norway
- Nickname: Isbjørnene (The Polar Bears)
- Association: Norwegian Ice Hockey Association
- Head coach: Janne Salmela
- Assistants: Marte Carlsson; Magnus Evensen
- Captain: Maren Knudsen
- Most games: Several players (20)
- Top scorer: Andrea Dalen (11); Mathea Fischer (11)
- Most points: Mathea Fischer (22)
- Team colors
- IIHF code: NOR
| Home colours | Away colours |

First international
- Austria 2 – 1 Norway (Chambéry, France; 28 December 2008)

Biggest win
- Norway 15 – 0 Australia (Jaca, Spain; 8 January 2024)

Biggest defeat
- Japan 13 – 0 Norway (Győr, Hungary; 6 April 2022)

IIHF World Women's U18 Championships - Division I A
- Appearances: 14 (first in 2009)
- Best result: 2nd (2015)

International record (W–L–T)
- 27–41–0

The Norway women's national under-18 ice hockey team is the national under-18 ice hockey team in Norway. The team represents Norway at the International Ice Hockey Federation's IIHF World Women's U18 Championships.

== History ==
The inaugural Norway national under-18 participation was on 12–14 December 2008 in Hønefoss. The team would compete at Division I, which were held in Chambéry, France from 28 December 2008 to 2 January 2009. Birger Aaserud og Kjersti Malo Dyb lead the national team.

Their division competition were: Japan, France, Slovakia and Austria. They lost in every match, earned a goal deposit of 9–16 and avoided relegation as there is no placement lower than last team of Division I. Japan earned a promotion.

The 2010 IIHF World Women's U18 Championship – Division I tournament was on 3–9 April in Piešťany, Slovakia. They faced France, Slovakia and Austria, relegated Switzerland, and new team Kazakhstan. They lost four of the matches, won their first match against Kazakhstan, and ended 5th in the Division. Switzerland was promoted

== World Women's U18 Championship record ==
| Year | GP | W | L | GF | GA | Pts | Rank |
|---|---|---|---|---|---|---|---|
| 2009 | 4 | 0 | 4 | 9 | 16 | 0 | 13th place |
| 2010 | 5 | 1 | 4 | 14 | 27 | 3 | 13th place |
| 2011 | 5 | 2 | 3 | 16 | 11 | 6 | 12th place |
| 2012 | 5 | 2 | 3 | 13 | 13 | 6 | 12th place |
| 2013 | 5 | 3 | 2 | 10 | 10 | 9 | 12th place |
| 2014 | 5 | 2 | 3 | 11 | 14 | 6 | 12th place |
| 2015 | 5 | 4^ | 1* | 14 | 9 | 12 | 10th place |
| 2016 | 5 | 2 | 3 | 14 | 12 | 6 | 12th place |
| 2017 | 5 | 2^ | 3 | 14 | 14 | 5 | 11th place |
| 2018 | 5 | 1^ | 4 | 4 | 13 | 2 | 14th place (Relegated to Division I B) |
| 2019 | 5 | 4^ | 1* | 14 | 4 | 12 | 16th place |
| 2020 | 5 | 3 | 2** | 13 | 7 | 11 | 15th place (Promoted to Division 1 A) |
| 2022 | 4 | 0 | 4* | 5 | 26 | 1 | 13th place |
| 2023 | 5 | 1 | 4 | 8 | 16 | 3 | 14th place (Relegated to Division I B) |
| 2024 | 5 | 5 | 0 | 37 | 4 | 15 | 15th place (Promoted to Division 1 A) |

^Includes one win in extra time (in the round robin)
*Includes one loss in extra time (in the round robin)
**Includes two losses in extra time (in the round robin)
