= France women's ice hockey league =

Championnat de France de hockey sur glace féminin
- Upcoming season or competition: 2021–22 FFHG Féminin Élite season
- Sport: Ice hockey
- Founded: 1986
- First season: 1986–87
- No. of teams: 12
- Country: France
- Most recent champion: Remparts de Tours (2022–23)
- Most titles: HC Cergy-Pontoise (19)
- Website: Official website

The France women's ice hockey league (French: Championnat de France de hockey sur glace féminin, lit. 'French Championship in women's ice hockey') or the FFHG Féminin Élite ('FFHG Elite Women') is the top level of women's ice hockey in France. The league is organized by the Fédération Française de Hockey sur Glace (FFHG). The competition began in 1987. In some years, a second-level competition, the Excellence Division, has been held.

== Format ==
The twelve teams in the league are divided into two divisions, North and South. During the regular season, each team plays each of the others in their division twice (once at home and once away), with 3 points being awarded for a win in regulation time, 2 points for a win in overtime or shootouts, 1 point for an overtime/shootout loss, and 0 points for a regulation time loss. The overtime period lasts 5 minutes, and is played 3 vs. 3 sudden-death. The regular season usually takes place from September to March.

The top two teams from each division then go on to play in a three-game playoff tournament (facing each other team once) in a pre-selected host city. The team that finishes with the most points in the playoff tournament is crowned league champions. The playoff tournament usually takes place at the end of March.

=== Current clubs (2021–22) ===
Poule Nord
| Team | City | Arena | Capacity |
|---|---|---|---|
| Gothiques d'Amiens | Amiens | Coliséum | 2882 |
| HC Cergy-Pontoise | Cergy-Pontoise | Aren'ice | 4500 |
| Jets d’Évry-Viry | Essonne | Patinoire des Lacs | 900 |
| Bisonnes de Neuilly-sur-Marne | Neuilly-sur-Marne | Patinoire municipale de Neuilly-sur-Marne | 500 |
| Griz'Louves de Saint-Ouen/Garges | Saint Ouen | Patinoire de Saint Ouen | 700 |
| Remparts de Tours | Tours | Patinoire de Tours | 2316 |

Poule Sud
| Team | City | Arena | Capacity |
|---|---|---|---|
| Aigles de Besançon | Besançon | Patinoire La Fayette | 1300 |
| Déferlantes de Bordeaux/Anglet | Bordeaux | Patinoire de Bordeaux Mériadeck | 3312 |
| Brûleurs de Loups | Grenoble | Patinoire Polesud | 3496 |
| Hockey Féminin 74 | Chamonix | Patinoire Richard-Bozon | 1700 |
| Rafales d'Occitanie | Castres | Patinoire de l'Archipel | |
| Amazones de Marseille-PACA | Marseille | | |

== Champions ==
- 1986–87 : CSG Grenoble
- 1987–88 : CSG Grenoble
- 1988–89 : Gap HC
- 1989–90 : CSG Saint-Ouen
- 1990–91 : HC Cergy-Pontoise
- 1991–92 : HC Cergy-Pontoise
- 1992–93 : HC Cergy-Pontoise
- 1993–94 : HC Cergy-Pontoise
- 1994–95 : Club des Patineurs Lyonnais
- 1995–96 : HC Cergy-Pontoise
- 1996–97 : HC Cergy-Pontoise
- 1997–98 : HC Cergy-Pontoise
- 1998–99 : Lyon Hockey Club
- 1999–2000 : HC Cergy-Pontoise
- 2000–01 : HC Cergy-Pontoise
- 2001–02 : HC Cergy-Pontoise
- 2002–03 : HC Cergy-Pontoise
- 2003–04 : HC Cergy-Pontoise
- 2004–05 : HC Cergy-Pontoise
- 2005–06 : HC Cergy-Pontoise
- 2006–07 : HC Cergy-Pontoise
- 2007–08 : HC Cergy-Pontoise
- 2008–09 : HC Cergy-Pontoise
- 2009–10 : Grenoble Métropole Hockey 38
- 2010–11 : Grenoble Métropole Hockey 38
- 2011–12 : Grenoble Métropole Hockey 38
- 2012–13 : Bisons de Neuilly-sur-Marne
- 2013–14 : Bisons de Neuilly-sur-Marne
- 2014–15 : Bisons de Neuilly-sur-Marne
- 2015–16 : Bisons de Neuilly-sur-Marne
- 2016–17 : HC Cergy-Pontoise
- 2017–18 : Aigles de Besançon
- 2018–19 : Remparts de Tours
- 2019–20 : Not awarded due to COVID-19 pandemic in France
- 2020–21 : Not awarded due to COVID-19 pandemic in France
- 2021–22 : Remparts de Tours
- 2022–23 : Remparts de Tours

Sources: FFHG, Hockey Archives

== Excellence Division Champions ==
- 1999–2000 : HC Caen
- 2000–01 : HC Amiens Somme
- 2008–09 : Bretagne
- 2009–10 : Bretagne
- 2010–11 : Gap Hockey Club
- 2011–12 : HC Cergy-Pontoise
- 2012–13 : HC Cergy-Pontoise
- 2013–14 : HC Cergy-Pontoise
