= France women's national under-18 ice hockey team =

Youth ice hockey team representing France

France
- Association: Fédération Française de Hockey sur Glace
- Head coach: Baptiste Arpin
- Assistants: Morgane Rihet
- Captain: Louise Apertet (2024)
- Most games: Lisa Bauer (25); Maud Pousse (25); Léa Villiot (25)
- Top scorer: Estelle Duvin (19)
- Most points: Estelle Duvin (28)
- Team colors
- IIHF code: FRA

First international
- France 2 – 1 (SO) Slovakia (Chambéry, France; 28 December 2008)

Biggest win
- France 7 – 0 China (Dumfries, Great Britain; 6 January 2019)

Biggest defeat
- Russia 10 – 0 France (Dmitrov, Russia; 3 April 2011); Finland 11 – 1 France (St. Catharines, Canada; 8 January 2016)

IIHF U18 Women's World Championship
- Appearances: 1 (first in 2016)
- Best result: 8th (2016)

International record (W–L–T)
- 30–24–0

The French women's national under 18 ice hockey team is the national under-18 ice hockey team of France. The team is organized by the Fédération Française de Hockey sur Glace (FFHG), a member of the International Ice Hockey Federation (IIHF).

== U18 Women's World Championship record ==
Year	GP	W	L	GF	GA	Pts	Rank
2009	4	3^	1	9	7	8	10th place
2010	5	4	1	16	15	12	10th place
2011	5	1	4	5	25	3	13th place (Relegated to Division I - Qualification)
2012	5	2	3	10	9	6	17th place (Promoted to Division I)
2013	10	7	3	23	25	14	11th place
2014	5	4^	1	16	10	11	10th place
2015	5	5^	0	21	9	14	9th place (Promoted to World Championships)
2016	5	0	5	2	31	0	8th place (Relegated to Division I)
2017	5	0	5*	7	18	1	14th place (Relegated to Division I B)
2018	5	4	1	16	6	12	16th place
2019	5	4	1*	18	2	13	15th place (Promoted to Division I A)

^Includes one win in extra time (in the round robin)
*Includes one loss in extra time (in the round robin)

== Team ==
=== Current roster ===
Roster for the 2024 IIHF U18 Women's World Championship Division I Group A, played 6 to 12 January 2024 in Egna - Neumarkt, Italy.

Head coach: Baptiste Arpin
Assistant coach: Morgane Rihet

No.	Pos.	Name	Height	Weight	Birthdate	Club
1	G	Liv Wegmuller	1.62 m (5 ft 4 in)	53 kg (117 lb)	2 June 2007 (age 19)	(France) Rapaces de Gap
3	D	Domitille Ratto	1.71 m (5 ft 7 in)	63 kg (139 lb)	9 February 2009 (age 17)	(France) Meudon HC
4	D	Noa Diop	1.65 m (5 ft 5 in)	69 kg (152 lb)	17 December 2007 (age 18)	(United States) Windy City Storm
5	F	Marleen Origlio	1.65 m (5 ft 5 in)	65 kg (143 lb)	13 March 2007 (age 19)	(France) Rapaces de Gap
6	D	Maud Tessier Maniere	1.68 m (5 ft 6 in)	60 kg (130 lb)	9 April 2007 (age 19)	(France) Brive HC
7	D	Alison Verleene	1.60 m (5 ft 3 in)	48 kg (106 lb)	17 July 2006 (age 20)	(France) Remparts de Tours
8	F	Ophélie Bontemps	1.60 m (5 ft 3 in)	62 kg (137 lb)	20 June 2006 (age 20)	(France) Évry-Viry Hockey 91
9	F	Louise Apertet – C	1.54 m (5 ft 1 in)	56 kg (123 lb)	30 June 2006 (age 20)	(France) HC 74 Megève
10	F	Maeli Moussier	1.59 m (5 ft 3 in)	52 kg (115 lb)	3 February 2009 (age 17)	(France) Rapaces de Gap
11	F	Leina Quiniou	1.65 m (5 ft 5 in)	70 kg (150 lb)	31 January 2007 (age 19)	(France) CSG Strasbourg-Alsace
12	F	Anaïs Peyne-Dingival	1.67 m (5 ft 6 in)	70 kg (150 lb)	29 May 2007 (age 19)	(France) HC Compiègne
13	F	Jade Bernoussi	1.60 m (5 ft 3 in)	66 kg (146 lb)	13 September 2007 (age 19)	(France) Montpellier Vipers
16	F	Armelle Chabert	1.62 m (5 ft 4 in)	55 kg (121 lb)	28 June 2007 (age 19)	(France) AC Boulogne-Billancourt
17	D	Clara Piazzon – A	1.68 m (5 ft 6 in)	65 kg (143 lb)	24 January 2006 (age 20)	(France) CSG Strasbourg-Alsace
18	D	Agathe Avenel	1.64 m (5 ft 5 in)	58 kg (128 lb)	1 February 2006 (age 20)	(France) CHA Rouen
19	D	Maude Facélina	1.57 m (5 ft 2 in)	64 kg (141 lb)	17 February 2006 (age 20)	(France) Montpellier Vipers
21	F	Emy Fulconis	1.54 m (5 ft 1 in)	53 kg (117 lb)	21 March 2006 (age 20)	(France) Brûleurs de Loups de Grenoble
23	F	Clémence Boudin	1.61 m (5 ft 3 in)	48 kg (106 lb)	1 June 2008 (age 18)	(France) HC 74 St-Gervais
24	F	Jana Poirrier – A	1.63 m (5 ft 4 in)	60 kg (130 lb)	28 February 2006 (age 20)	(France) Brûleurs de Loups de Grenoble
25	G	Violette Pianel Couriaut	1.73 m (5 ft 8 in)	65 kg (143 lb)	9 May 2006 (age 20)	(France) Ours de Villard-de-Lans

== See also ==
- France women's national ice hockey team
- FFHG Féminin Élite
