= Vitaliy Lytvynenko =

Ukrainian ice hockey player

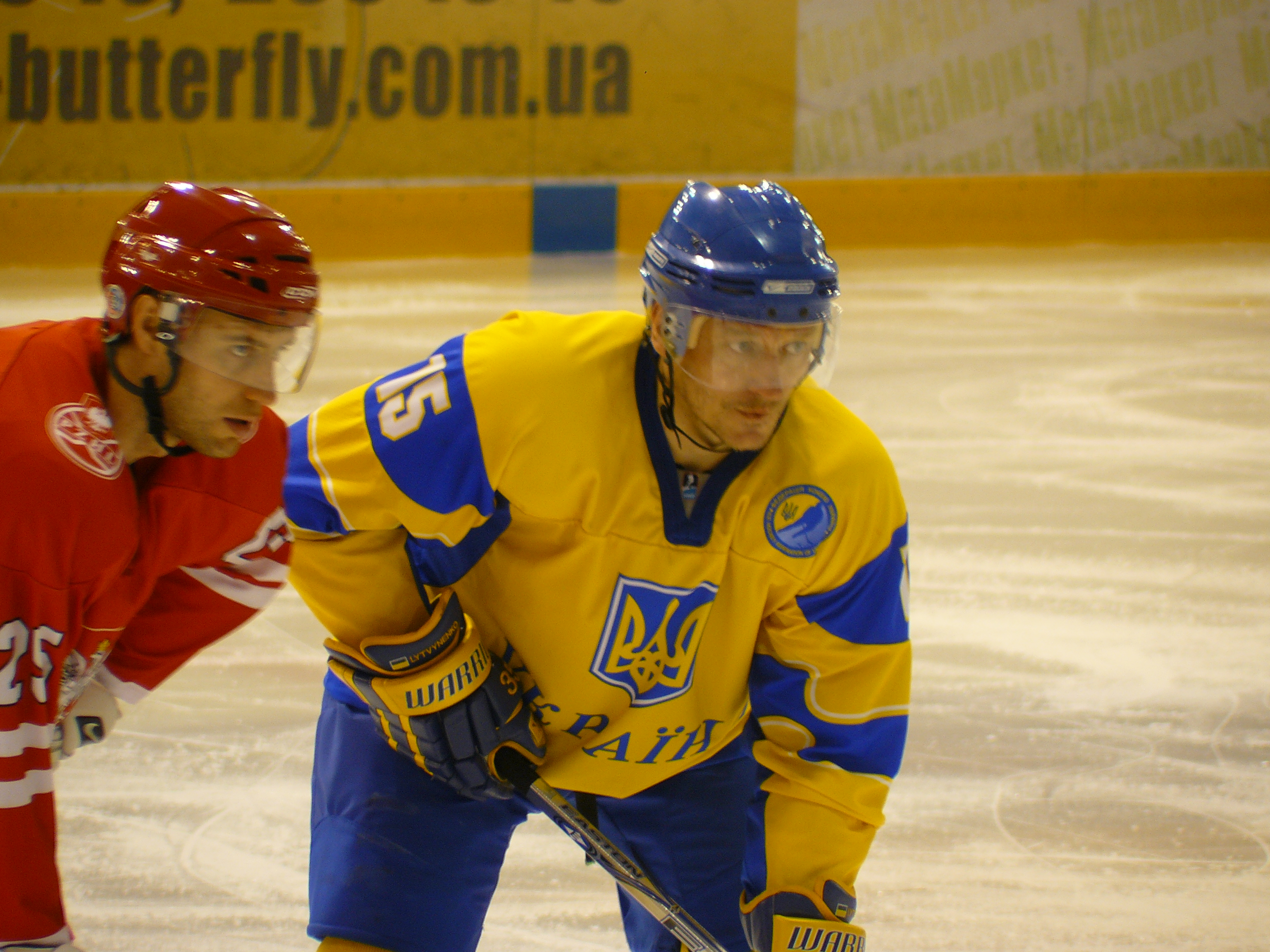
- Born: March 4, 1970 (age 56) Kharkiv, Ukrainian SSR, Soviet Union
- Height: 6 ft 0 in (183 cm)
- Weight: 194 lb (88 kg; 13 st 12 lb)
- Position: Right wing
- Shot: Left
- Played for: Vityaz Kharkiv; Kompanion Kyiv; Bilyi Bars Bila Tserkva; Sokil Kyiv; HK Gomel; Torpedo Nizhny Novgorod; Lada Togliatti; Lokomotiv Yaroslavl; Dynamo Kharkiv
- National team: Ukraine
- Playing career: 1987–2015

Vitaliy Ivanovich Lytvynenko (Ukrainian: Віталій Іванович Литвиненко; born March 3, 1970), is a Ukrainian retired professional ice hockey player. He played for multiple teams in both Ukraine and Russia during his career, which lasted from 1987 until 2015. He played internationally for the Ukrainian national team at several World Championships, as well as the 2002 Winter Olympics.

== Career statistics ==
=== Regular season and playoffs ===
			Regular season					Playoffs
Season	Team	League	GP	G	A	Pts	PIM	GP	G	A	Pts	PIM
1987–88	Dynamo Kharkiv	URS.2	4	0	0	0	0	—	—	—	—	—
1988–89	Dynamo Kharkiv	URS	22	1	1	2	8	—	—	—	—	—
1989–90	Dynamo Kharkiv	URS	28	6	2	8	2	—	—	—	—	—
1990–91	Dynamo Kharkiv	URS.2	64	14	8	22	30	—	—	—	—	—
1991–92	Dynamo Kharkiv	CIS.2	51	19	17	36	20	—	—	—	—	—
1992–93	Sokol Kyiv	IHL	41	9	16	25	14	3	0	1	1	0
1993–94	Sokol Kyiv	IHL	43	16	17	33	12	—	—	—	—	—
1994–95	Sokol Kyiv	IHL	45	13	14	27	8	—	—	—	—	—
1995–96	Torpedo Yaroslavl	IHL	52	17	19	36	10	3	1	1	2	2
1995–96	Torpedo–2 Yaroslavl	RUS.2	1	0	0	0	0	—	—	—	—	—
1996–97	Torpedo Yaroslavl	RSL	42	10	18	28	14	9	2	2	4	4
1997–98	Torpedo Yaroslavl	RSL	46	14	20	34	22	—	—	—	—	—
1998–99	Torpedo Yaroslavl	RSL	22	3	4	7	2	14	2	3	5	8
1998–99	Torpedo–2 Yaroslavl	RUS.2	1	0	0	0	2	—	—	—	—	—
1999–2000	Torpedo Yaroslavl	RSL	37	4	10	14	10	10	1	0	1	4
1999–2000	Torpedo–2 Yaroslavl	RUS.3	1	0	0	0	0	—	—	—	—	—
2000–01	Torpedo Yaroslavl	RSL	44	10	9	19	20	11	2	0	2	2
2000–01	Torpedo–2 Yaroslavl	RUS.3	4	0	0	0	2	—	—	—	—	—
2001–02	Torpedo Yaroslavl	RSL	19	3	4	7	4	—	—	—	—	—
2001–02	Lada Togliatti	RSL	26	6	5	11	12	4	0	0	0	0
2002–03	Torpedo Nizhny Novgorod	RUS.2	46	15	24	39	20	12	4	5	9	2
2002–03	Torpedo–2 Nizhny Novgorod	RUS.3	2	1	2	3	4	—	—	—	—	—
2003–04	Torpedo Nizhny Novgorod	RUS.2	23	1	5	6	0	—	—	—	—	—
2003–04	Torpedo–2 Nizhny Novgorod	RUS.3	10	5	11	16	4	—	—	—	—	—
2004–05	Sokol Kyiv	BLR	41	14	20	34	4	11	3	2	5	12
2004–05	Sokol Kyiv	UKR	—	—	—	—	—	2	4	1	5	0
2005–06	Sokol Kyiv	BLR	52	18	44	62	30	3	2	1	3	6
2005–06	Sokol Kyiv	UKR	—	—	—	—	—	3	0	1	1	6
2006–07	HK Gomel	BLR	50	13	44	57	30	5	0	3	3	6
2007–08	Sokol Kyiv	RUS.2	59	10	40	50	28	3	0	1	1	2
2008–09	Sokol Kyiv	RUS.2	59	12	30	42	16	6	3	3	6	2
2008–09	Sokol–2 Kyiv	UKR	—	—	—	—	—	3	2	2	4	0
2009–10	Sokol Kyiv	BLR	45	11	21	32	36	8	1	2	3	4
2010–11	Sokol Kyiv	BLR	47	10	22	32	16	3	1	1	2	2
2010–11	Sokol–2 Kyiv	UKR	—	—	—	—	—	1	0	0	0	0
2011–12	Sokol Kyiv	UKR	41	8	21	29	18	—	—	—	—	—
2012–13	Bilyy Bars Bila Tserkva	UKR	34	5	14	19	34	—	—	—	—	—
2013–14	HC Kompanion–Naftogaz	UKR	21	8	12	20	4	7	2	3	5	2
2014–15	Vityaz Kharkiv	UKR	10	5	9	14	0	3	2	3	5
IHL totals			181	55	66	121	44	6	1	2	3	2
RSL totals			259	51	75	126	84	48	7	5	12	18
BLR totals			235	66	151	217	116	30	7	9	16	30

=== International ===
Year	Team	Event	GP	G	A	Pts	PIM
1993	Ukraine	WC C	7	6	10	16	2
1994	Ukraine	WC C	6	5	5	10	6
1995	Ukraine	WC C	4	3	2	5	2
1998	Ukraine	WC B	7	3	4	7	2
1999	Ukraine	WC	3	1	0	1	2
1999	Ukraine	WC Q	3	1	1	2	0
2000	Ukraine	WC	6	4	2	6	2
2001	Ukraine	OGQ	3	0	2	2	0
2001	Ukraine	WC	6	1	0	1	2
2002	Ukraine	OG	4	0	1	1	4
2003	Ukraine	WC	6	0	3	3	2
2004	Ukraine	WC	6	0	3	3	2
2005	Ukraine	OGQ	3	0	1	1	0
2005	Ukraine	WC	6	0	0	0	0
2006	Ukraine	WC	6	0	1	1	2
2008	Ukraine	WC D1	5	0	1	1	12
2009	Ukraine	OGQ	3	0	0	0	0
2009	Ukraine	WC D1	5	2	1	3	0
Senior totals			89	26	37	63	40
