= Dmytro Yakushyn =

Ukrainian ice hockey player

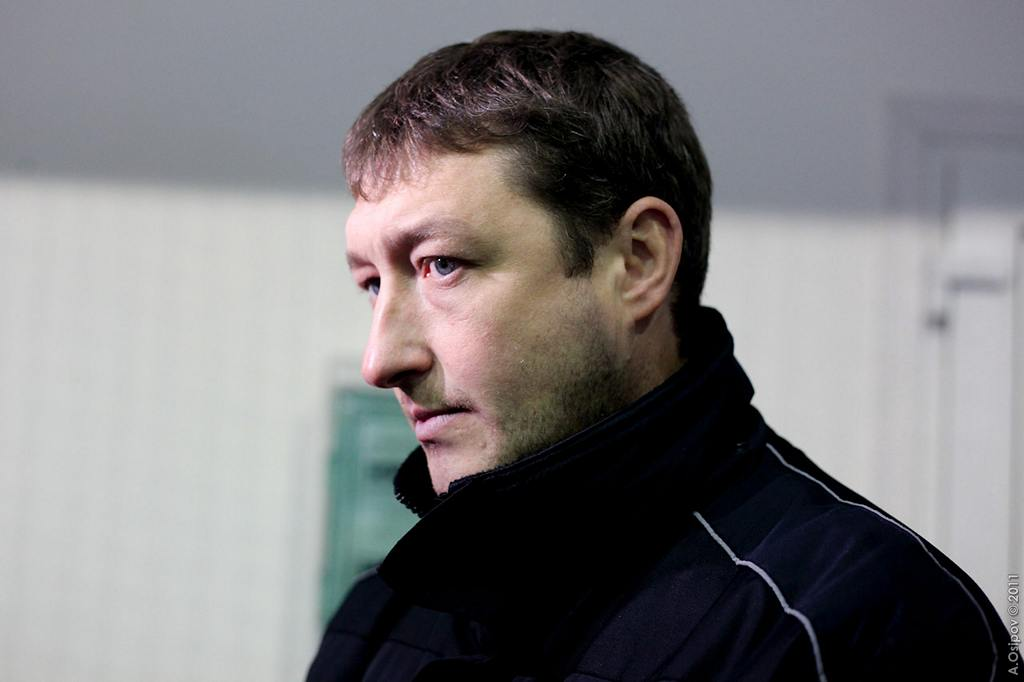
- Yakushyn in 2011
- Born: January 21, 1978 (age 48) Kharkiv, Ukrainian SSR, Soviet Union
- Height: 5 ft 11 in (180 cm)
- Weight: 198 lb (90 kg; 14 st 2 lb)
- Position: Defence
- Shot: Left
- National team: Ukraine
- NHL draft: 140th overall, 1996; Toronto Maple Leafs
- Playing career: 1998–2013

Dmytro Viktorovych Yakushyn (Ukrainian: Дмитро Вікторович Якушин; born January 21, 1978) is a Ukrainian former professional ice hockey player. He also played two games for the Toronto Maple Leafs in the 1999–00 season. The rest of his career, which lasted from 1998 to 2013, was spent in the minor leagues and then later in Europe. Internationally Yakushyn played for the Ukrainian national team in three World Championships. As a youth, he played in the 1992 Quebec International Pee-Wee Hockey Tournament with a team from Kharkiv.

== Career statistics ==
=== Regular season and playoffs ===
			Regular season					Playoffs
Season	Team	League	GP	G	A	Pts	PIM	GP	G	A	Pts	PIM
1994–95	Druzhba-78 Kharkov	UKR U18	—	—	—	—	—	—	—	—	—	—
1995–96	Pembroke Lumber Kings	CJHL	31	8	5	13	62	—	—	—	—	—
1996–97	Edmonton Ice	WHL	63	3	14	17	103	—	—	—	—	—
1997–98	Edmonton Ice	WHL	29	1	10	11	41	—	—	—	—	—
1997–98	Regina Pats	WHL	13	0	14	14	16	9	2	8	10	12
1998–99	St. John's Maple Leafs	AHL	71	2	6	8	65	4	0	0	0	0
1999–00	Toronto Maple Leafs	NHL	2	0	0	0	0	—	—	—	—	—
1999–00	St. John's Maple Leafs	AHL	64	1	13	14	106	—	—	—	—	—
2000–01	St. John's Maple Leafs	AHL	45	2	0	2	61	1	0	0	0	0
2001–02	Sokil Kyiv	UKR	3	1	0	1	4	—	—	—	—	—
2001–02	Donbass Donetsk	UKR	8	3	8	11	6	—	—	—	—	—
2001–02	Sokil Kyiv	EEHL	13	1	3	4	54	—	—	—	—	—
2002–03	St. John's Maple Leafs	AHL	29	1	2	3	23	—	—	—	—	—
2003–04	AaB Ishockey	DEN	13	0	2	2	24	—	—	—	—	—
2004–05	HK Khimvolokno Mogilev	BLR	39	4	3	7	88	9	0	2	2	2
2005–06	AaB Ishockey	DEN	29	1	7	8	40	16	1	2	3	55
2006–07	HK Neman Grodno	BLR	39	4	4	8	129	3	0	1	1	0
2006–07	HK Neman Grodno-2	BLR-2	1	0	1	1	6	—	—	—	—	—
2007–08	HK Keramin Minsk	BLR	48	7	10	17	144	5	0	2	2	39
2008–09	Sokol Kyiv	RUS-2	37	1	8	9	44	4	0	0	0	2
2008–09	Sokol Kyiv-2	UKR	—	—	—	—	—	6	0	0	0	10
2009–10	HK Gomel	BLR	45	2	18	20	110	7	2	3	5	10
2010–11	HK Gomel	BLR	20	2	3	5	53	—	—	—	—	—
2010–11	Metallurg Zhlobin	BLR	13	0	3	3	52	6	2	0	2	18
2012–13	HC Dynamo Kharkiv	UKR	—	—	—	—	—	2	0	0	0	2
AHL totals			209	6	21	27	255	5	0	0	0	0
BLR totals			204	19	41	60	576	30	4	8	12	69
NHL totals			2	0	0	0	0	—	—	—	—	—

=== International ===
Year	Team	Event	GP	G	A	Pts	PIM
2000	Ukraine	WC	6	1	1	2	6
2008	Ukraine	WC-I	5	0	1	1	0
2009	Ukraine	WC-I	5	0	1	1	4
Senior totals			16	1	3	4	10
