= Serhiy Varlamov =

Ukrainian ice hockey player

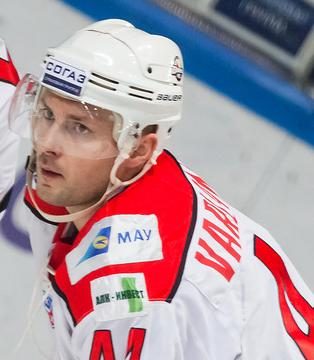
- Born: July 21, 1978 (age 46); Kyiv, Ukrainian SSR, Soviet Union
- Height: 5 ft 10 in (178 cm)
- Weight: 203 lb (92 kg; 14 st 7 lb)
- Position: Left wing
- Shot: Left
- Played for: Calgary Flames; St. Louis Blues; Ak Bars Kazan; HC Sibir Novosibirsk; Severstal Cherepovets; SKA Saint Petersburg; Sokil Kyiv; HC Dinamo Minsk; HC Donbass
- National team: Ukraine
- NHL draft: Undrafted
- Playing career: 1997–2016

Serhiy Volodymyrovych Varlamov (Ukrainian: Сергі́й Володи́мирович Варла́мов; born July 21, 1978) is a Ukrainian former professional ice hockey player. He played for the Calgary Flames and St. Louis Blues of the National Hockey League (NHL).

== Playing career ==
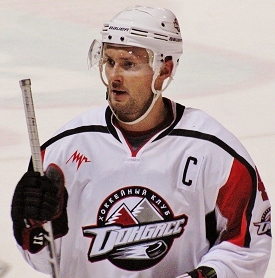
Varlamov in 2012

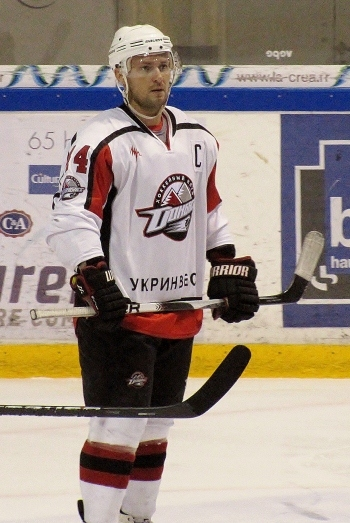
Varlamov in 2012

Known as Sergei Varlamov during his North American career from the Russian-language version of his name, Varlamov came to North America to play junior hockey with the Swift Current Broncos of the Western Hockey League (WHL). In 1998, he won the Bob Clarke Trophy as the WHL's top scorer with 119 points. He was also named the Four Broncos Memorial Trophy winner as the league's player of the year, and won the CHL Player of the Year award. He signed with the Calgary Flames as a free agent in 1996 and spent three seasons in the Flames system from 1999 until 2001 when he was traded to the St. Louis Blues. After spending a year in the Vancouver Canucks organization, Varlamov signed with Ak Bars Kazan of the Russian Super League in 2004 and has also played with HC Sibir Novosibirsk, Severstal Cherepovets, SKA Saint Petersburg and HC Dinamo Minsk.

== International play ==
Internationally, Varlamov played with the Ukraine men's national ice hockey team at the 2002 Winter Olympics and at three World Championships: 2000, 2004 and 2005.

== Career statistics ==
=== Regular season and playoffs ===
			Regular season					Playoffs
Season	Team	League	GP	G	A	Pts	PIM	GP	G	A	Pts	PIM
1994–95	Nelson Leafs	RMJHL	26	11	15	26	56	—	—	—	—	—
1994–95	Fort McMurray Oil Barons	AJHL	5	1	1	2	2	—	—	—	—	—
1995–96	Swift Current Broncos	WHL	55	23	21	44	65	—	—	—	—	—
1996–97	Swift Current Broncos	WHL	72	46	39	85	94	10	3	8	11	10
1996–97	Saint John Flames	AHL	1	0	0	0	2	—	—	—	—	—
1997–98	Swift Current Broncos	WHL	72	66	53	119	132	12	10	5	15	28
1997–98	Calgary Flames	NHL	1	0	0	0	0	—	—	—	—	—
1997–98	Saint John Flames	AHL	—	—	—	—	—	3	0	0	0	0
1998–99	Saint John Flames	AHL	76	24	33	57	66	7	0	4	4	8
1999–2000	Calgary Flames	NHL	7	3	0	3	0	—	—	—	—	—
1999–2000	Saint John Flames	AHL	68	20	21	41	88	3	0	0	0	24
2000–01	Saint John Flames	AHL	55	21	30	51	26	19	15	8	23	10
2001–02	St. Louis Blues	NHL	52	5	7	12	26	1	0	0	0	2
2002–03	St. Louis Blues	NHL	3	0	0	0	0	—	—	—	—	—
2002–03	Worcester IceCats	AHL	72	23	38	61	79	3	2	0	2	0
2003–04	Worcester IceCats	AHL	43	7	16	23	18	—	—	—	—	—
2003–04	Manitoba Moose	AHL	12	4	2	6	10	—	—	—	—	—
2004–05	Ak Bars Kazan	RSL	2	0	0	0	2	—	—	—	—	—
2004–05	Sibir Novosibirsk	RSL	27	2	2	4	55	—	—	—	—	—
2005–06	Novosibirsk Siber	RSL	43	8	8	16	52	4	0	2	2	6
2006–07	Sibir Novosibirsk	RSL	48	13	11	24	70	7	1	0	1	6
2007–08	Sibir Novosibirsk	RSL	55	19	12	31	54	—	—	—	—	—
2008–09	Severstal Cherepovets	KHL	20	0	3	3	8	—	—	—	—	—
2008–09	SKA St. Petersburg	KHL	5	0	1	1	2	3	0	0	0	0
2008–09	HC VMF St. Petersburg	RUS.2	2	0	1	1	4	—	—	—	—	—
2009–10	Sokil Kyiv	BLR	29	11	21	32	58	—	—	—	—	—
2009–10	Dinamo Minsk	KHL	23	7	3	10	4	—	—	—	—	—
2010–11	Dinamo Minsk	KHL	37	8	9	17	12	5	0	0	0	2
2011–12	Donbass Donetsk	VHL	53	19	21	40	24	10	4	4	8	16
2012–13	Donbass Donetsk	KHL	48	8	10	18	18	—	—	—	—	—
2012–13	Donbass–2 Donetsk	PHL	—	—	—	—	—	7	0	3	3	6
2013–14	Donbass Donetsk	KHL	39	3	1	4	10	13	1	0	1	8
2015–16	Donbass Donetsk	UHXL	28	17	32	49	12	7	2	2	4	4
NHL totals			63	8	7	15	26	1	0	0	0	2
RSL totals			175	42	30	72	233	11	1	2	3	12
KHL totals			172	24	29	53	54	21	1	0	1	10

=== International ===
Year	Team	Event	GP	G	A	Pts	PIM
2000	Ukraine	WC	6	0	5	5	42
2002	Ukraine	OG	2	1	0	1	14
2003	Ukraine	WC	5	0	1	1	12
2004	Ukraine	WC	6	0	1	1	18
2005	Ukraine	WC	6	2	0	2	0
2008	Ukraine	WC D1	5	1	4	5	70
2009	Ukraine	OGQ	3	3	0	3	6
2009	Ukraine	WC D1	5	2	2	4	35
2010	Ukraine	WC D1	5	2	4	6	52
2013	Ukraine	OGQ	3	3	3	6	2
2013	Ukraine	WC D1B	5	0	4	4	6
2014	Ukraine	WC D1A	5	0	0	0	4
2015	Ukraine	WC D1A	3	0	1	1	4
Senior totals			59	14	25	39	265

== Awards and achievements ==
- Named to the WHL East First All-Star Team in 1998

Preceded by Alyn McCauley	CHL Player of the Year; 1998	Succeeded by Brian Campbell
Preceded by Todd Robinson	Winner of the Bob Clarke Trophy; 1998	Succeeded by Pavel Brendl
Preceded by Peter Schaefer	Winner of the Four Broncos Memorial Trophy; 1998	Succeeded by Cody Rudkowsky
