= 2013–14 Ukrainian Hockey Championship =

2013–14 Ukrainian Hockey Championship season
- League: Ukrainian Hockey Championship
- Sport: Ice hockey
- Duration: 28 October 2013 – 11 March 2014
- Teams: 6

Regular season
- Regular season winners: HC Kompanion-Naftogaz
- Top scorer: Artem Bondarev (Bilyi Bars)

Playoffs
- Finals champions: HC Kompanion-Naftogaz
- Runners-up: Bilyi Bars

UHC/PHL seasons
- ← 2012–13 2014–15 →

The 2013–14 or XXII Ukrainian Hockey Championship was the 22nd annual edition of the Ukrainian Hockey Championship. Following the 2012–13 PHL season, national championship returned under the authority of Ice Hockey Federation of Ukraine (FHU) after two seasons were held by Professional Hockey League (PHL). The season concluded in a playoff series in March 2014.

== Regular season ==
R		GP	W	OTW	SOW	SOL	OTL	L	GF	GA	Pts
1	HC Kompanion-Naftogaz	24	18	0	0	4	0	2	98	43	58
2	Bilyi Bars	24	13	0	6	0	0	5	116	42	51
3	Sokil Kyiv	24	8	1	1	1	0	13	48	48	29
4	HC Levy	24	7	0	0	0	1	16	44	123	22
5	Generals Kiev	24	5	1	0	2	1	15	51	101	20
6	Vinnytski Haidamaky^{[a]}	0	0	0	0	0	0	0	0	0	0

- ^{a} Vinnytski Haidamaky were withdrawn because of constant failure to appear for their matches due to financial problems. All their results (six games) were canceled.

Points are awarded as follows: *3 Points for a win in regulation ("W") *2 Points for a win in overtime ("OTW") or a penalty shootout ("SOW") *1 Point for a loss in overtime ("OTL") or a penalty shootout ("SOL") *0 Points for a loss in regulation ("L")

== Playoffs ==
=== Bracket ===
Semifinals
1	HC Kompanion-Naftogaz	2
4	HC Levy	0
2	Bilyi Bars	2
3	Sokil Kyiv	0

Final
1	HC Kompanion-Naftogaz	3
2	Bilyi Bars	2

=== Semifinals ===
- HC Levy - HC Kompanion-Naftogaz 0-2 (2:6, 1:6)
- Sokil Kyiv - Bilyi Bars 0-2 (1:2, 1:6)

=== Final ===
- HC Kompanion-Naftogaz - Bilyi Bars 3-2 (3:1, 2:1, 1:3, 1:3, 2:1)
