= Andrei Nikolishin =

Russian ice hockey player

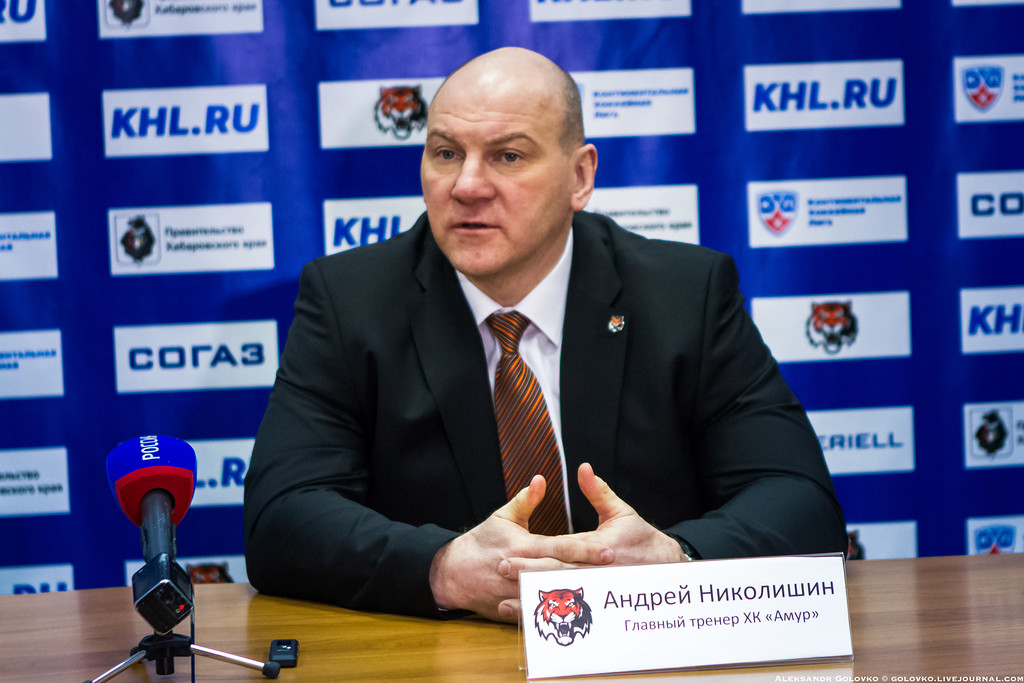
- Born: 25 March 1973 (age 51); Vorkuta, Russian SFSR, Soviet Union
- Height: 6 ft 0 in (183 cm)
- Weight: 213 lb (97 kg; 15 st 3 lb)
- Position: Centre
- Shot: Left
- Played for: NHL; Hartford Whalers; Washington Capitals; Chicago Blackhawks; Colorado Avalanche; RSL; Dynamo Moscow; CSKA Moscow; Lada Togliatti; Avangard Omsk; SKA St. Petersburg; Traktor Chelyabinsk
- National team: Russia
- NHL draft: 47th overall, 1992; Hartford Whalers
- Playing career: 1990–2012

Andrei Vasilievich Nikolishin (Russian: Андре́й Васи́льевич Николи́шин; born 25 March 1973) is a Russian former professional ice hockey player who last played for Sokil Kyiv of the Professional Hockey League of Ukraine. Over his National Hockey League career with the Hartford Whalers, Washington Capitals, Chicago Blackhawks and the Colorado Avalanche he played in 628 games, with 93 goals and 280 points.

== Playing career ==
Nikolishin began his professional career with HC Dynamo Moscow. He played for four years domestically in Russia and was named Russian player of the Year in the 1993–94 season. During this time Andrei also captured a gold medal with the CIS in the 1992 World Junior Championships and represented Russia in the 1993 World Championships, 1994 Winter Olympics and the 1994 World Championships.

Nikolishin was drafted in the second round of the 1992 NHL Entry Draft, picked 47th by the Hartford Whalers. He made his NHL debut in the delayed 1994–95 season with the Whalers and following with 51 points in the 1995-96 season. After representing Russia in the 1996 World Cup, Nikolishin started the 1996-97 season with the Whalers but was shortly traded to the Washington Capitals for Curtis Leschyshyn on November 9, 1996.

In the following 1997-98 campaign, Nikolishin established himself as an important checking and special teams player, recording 13 assists in the playoffs helping the Capitals reach the Stanley Cup finals before falling to champions the Detroit Red Wings. After a brief holdout prior to the 1998–99 season, Nikolishin was a main-stay on the checking line for the Capitals over the next four seasons.

After representing Russia in the 2002 Winter Olympics, Nikolishin was traded from the Capitals, along with Chris Simon, to the Chicago Blackhawks for Michael Nylander and a 2003 third round pick (Steve Werner) on November 1, 2002. Nikolishin played just one season with the Blackhawks before he was again dealt on June 21, 2003, to the Colorado Avalanche prior to the 2003–04 season, his last in the NHL.

Due to the 2004 NHL Lockout, Andrei returned to Russia and signed with HC CSKA Moscow on June 4, 2004. He has since played with Lada Togliatti, Avangard Omsk and SKA St. Petersburg.

On November 5, 2007, Nikolishin was signed by Traktor Chelyabinsk and remained with the team as captain when Traktor joined the newly formed KHL in the 2008–09 season.

== Personal ==
Nikolishin comes from a Ukrainian family. Following the Russian Revolution, the brother of his grandfather went on to serve in the Polish Army, and eventually emigrate the family to Edmonton, Alberta, known for its large Ukrainian Canadian diaspora population.

His father, Vasyl Nikolishin, was a victim of Joseph Stalin's Great Purge, and was exiled from Ukraine to a Gulag forced labor coal mine in Vorkuta, the largest center of the camps in European Russia, for a period of 25 years. His parents did not tell him of this until he was older, out of fear of repressions, jeopardizing his career, and the stigma of being an enemy of the people that would restrict his travel abroad. Upon his death, his father's body was repatriated to Vivnya, Lviv Oblast.

== Career statistics ==
=== Regular season and playoffs ===
			Regular season					Playoffs
Season	Team	League	GP	G	A	Pts	PIM	GP	G	A	Pts	PIM
1990–91	Dynamo Moscow	USSR	2	0	0	0	0	—	—	—	—	—
1990–91	Dynamo–2 Moscow	USSR-3	36	11	8	19	26	—	—	—	—	—
1991–92	Dynamo Moscow	CIS	6	1	0	1	2	6	0	0	0	2
1991–92	Dynamo–2 Moscow	CIS-3	36	22	15	37	40	—	—	—	—	—
1992–93	Dynamo Moscow	RUS	42	5	7	12	30	10	2	1	3	8
1993–94	Dynamo Moscow	RUS	41	8	12	20	30	9	1	3	4	4
1994–95	Dynamo Moscow	RUS	12	7	2	9	6	—	—	—	—	—
1994–95	Hartford Whalers	NHL	39	8	10	18	10	—	—	—	—	—
1995–96	Hartford Whalers	NHL	61	14	37	51	34	—	—	—	—	—
1996–97	Hartford Whalers	NHL	12	2	5	7	2	—	—	—	—	—
1996–97	Washington Capitals	NHL	59	7	14	21	30	—	—	—	—	—
1997–98	Portland Pirates	AHL	2	0	0	0	2	—	—	—	—	—
1997–98	Washington Capitals	NHL	38	6	10	16	14	21	1	13	14	12
1998–99	Dynamo Moscow	RSL	4	0	0	0	0	—	—	—	—	—
1998–99	Washington Capitals	NHL	73	8	27	35	28	—	—	—	—	—
1999–00	Washington Capitals	NHL	76	11	14	25	28	5	0	2	2	4
2000–01	Washington Capitals	NHL	81	13	25	38	34	6	0	0	0	2
2001–02	Washington Capitals	NHL	80	13	23	36	40	—	—	—	—	—
2002–03	Chicago Blackhawks	NHL	60	6	15	21	26	—	—	—	—	—
2003–04	Colorado Avalanche	NHL	49	5	7	12	24	11	0	2	2	4
2004–05	CSKA Moscow	RSL	55	7	19	26	62	—	—	—	—	—
2005–06	Lada Togliatti	RSL	14	2	0	2	36	—	—	—	—	—
2005–06	Avangard Omsk	RSL	19	3	4	7	8	13	1	2	3	32
2006–07	SKA St. Petersburg	RSL	19	2	2	4	26	3	0	0	0	10
2007–08	Traktor Chelyabinsk	RSL	32	11	21	32	30	3	0	0	0	4
2008–09	Traktor Chelyabinsk	KHL	48	10	29	39	108	3	1	0	1	2
2009–10	Traktor Chelyabinsk	KHL	46	7	14	21	77	2	0	0	0	2
2010–11	Traktor Chelyabinsk	KHL	30	5	8	13	22	—	—	—	—	—
2011–12	Sokil Kyiv	UKR	36	16	45	61	32	8	3	5	8	14
RSL totals			142	25	46	71	166	19	1	2	3	46
KHL totals			124	22	52	74	207	5	1	0	1	4
NHL totals			628	93	187	280	270	43	1	17	18	22

=== International ===
Olympic medal record

Representing Russia

Men's ice hockey
Bronze medal – third place	2002 Salt Lake City	Team

Year	Team	Event	Result	GP	G	A	Pts	PIM
1991	Soviet Union	EJC	2nd place, silver medalist(s)	3	3	3	6	10
1992	CIS	WJC	1st place, gold medalist(s)	7	1	2	3	2
1993	Russia	WC	1st place, gold medalist(s)	8	1	3	4	8
1994	Russia	OG	4th	8	2	5	7	6
1994	Russia	WC	5th	6	0	0	0	0
1996	Russia	WC	4th	8	2	3	5	10
1996	Russia	WCH	SF	4	1	3	4	4
1997	Russia	WC	4th	5	0	1	1	6
2000	Russia	WC	11th	4	0	0	0	0
2002	Russia	OG	3rd place, bronze medalist(s)	6	0	1	1	6
Junior totals				10	4	5	9	12
Senior totals				49	6	16	22	38
