= Clay Wilson =

American ice hockey player (born 1983)

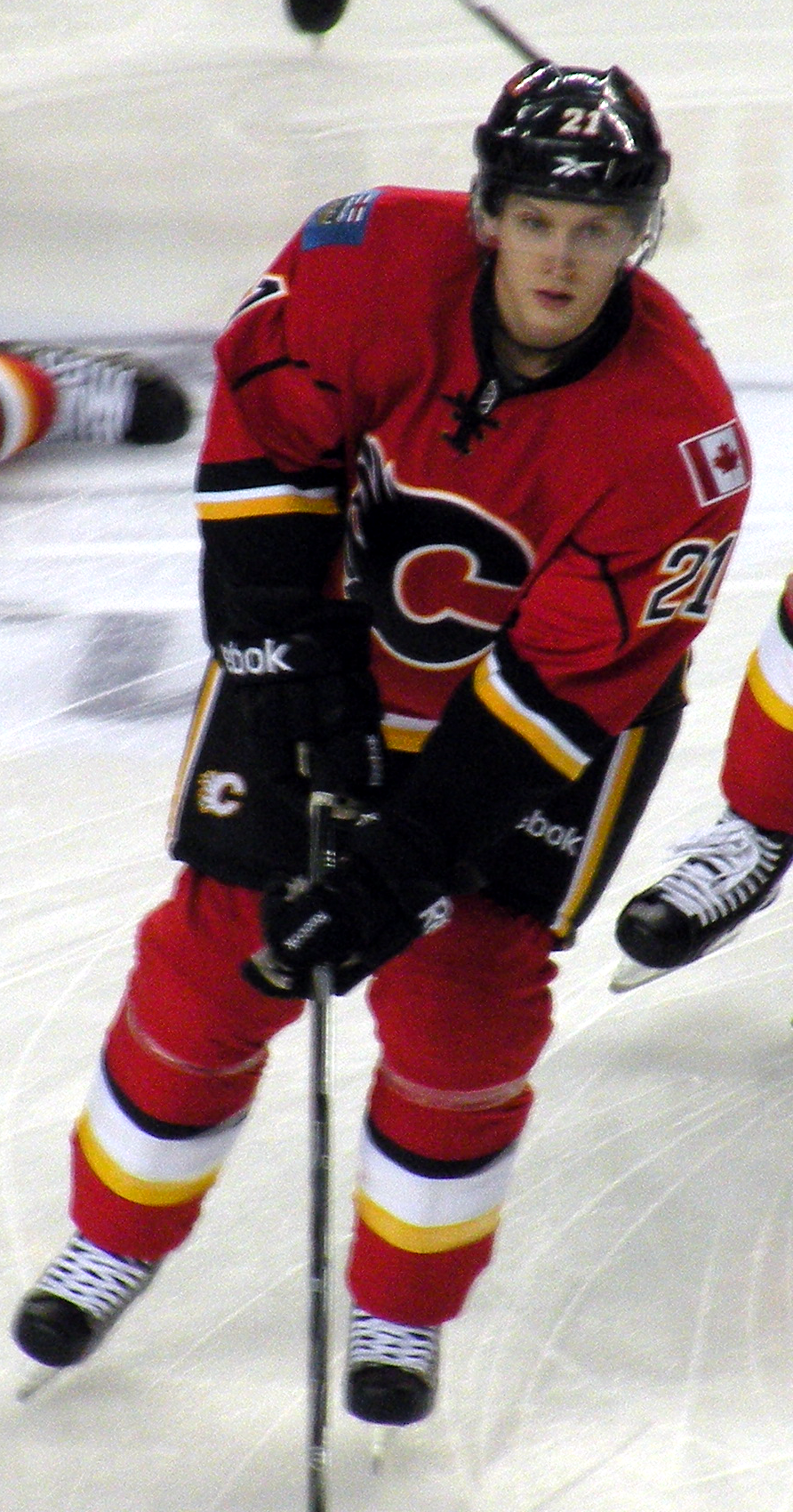
- Wilson with the Calgary Flames in 2012
- Born: April 5, 1983 (age 43) Sturgeon Lake, Minnesota, U.S.
- Height: 6 ft 0 in (183 cm)
- Weight: 195 lb (88 kg; 13 st 13 lb)
- Position: Defense
- Shot: Left
- Played for: Columbus Blue Jackets; Atlanta Thrashers; Florida Panthers; Calgary Flames; HC Donbass; HC Sochi; Severstal Cherepovets; AIK IF
- National team: United States
- NHL draft: Undrafted
- Playing career: 2005–2018

Clay Daniel Wilson (born April 5, 1983) is an American former professional ice hockey defenseman. He played 36 games in the National Hockey League (NHL) for the Columbus Blue Jackets, Atlanta Thrashers, Florida Panthers and Calgary Flames.

== Playing career ==
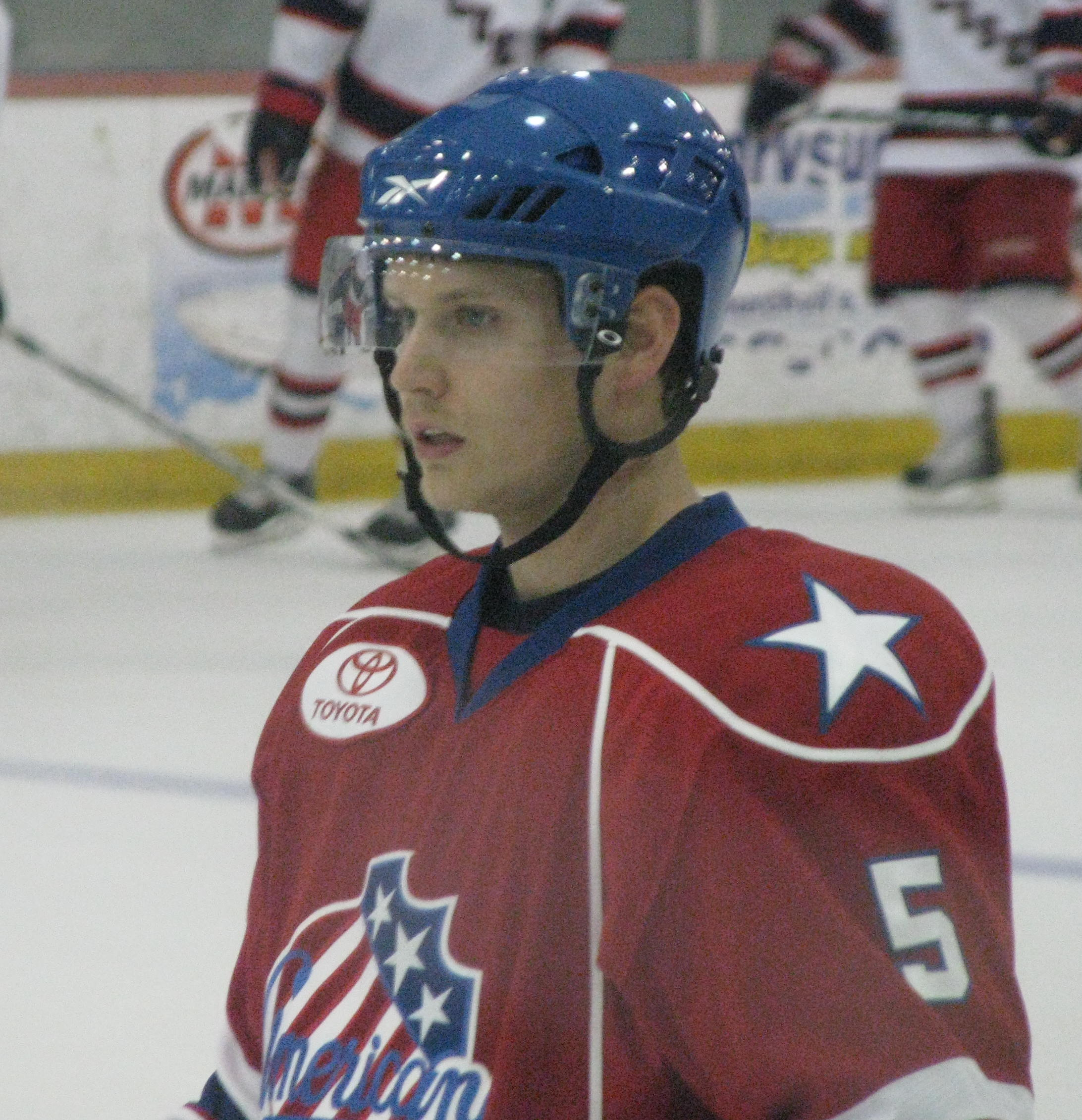
Wilson as a member of the Rochester Americans

Clay Wilson played collegiate hockey for Michigan Tech from 2001 until 2005. After the 2004–05 collegiate season ended, he turned professional with the Muskegon Fury of the UHL. He played parts of two seasons with Muskegon before joining the Grand Rapids Griffins of the AHL. After the 2005–06 season, he was signed as a free agent by the Anaheim Ducks of the NHL. He played for the Ducks' AHL affiliate, the Portland Pirates before being traded to the Columbus Blue Jackets of the NHL in November 2007.

Wilson made his NHL debut with the Blue Jackets on March 25, 2008, against the Nashville Predators. He scored his first NHL goal and assist on March 26, 2008, in a game against the Chicago Blackhawks, earning him first star honors in only his second NHL game. On January 14, 2009, Wilson was traded by the Blue Jackets, along with a 6th round draft pick, to the Atlanta Thrashers for Jason Williams.

Wilson signed a two-year, two-way contract with the Florida Panthers on July 2, 2009. Wilson was then assigned to AHL affiliate, the Rochester Americans, for the majority of the 2009–10 season before making his Panthers debut on April 3, 2010, against the New York Rangers. Although appearing in only two NHL games, Clay scored an impressive 60 points in 75 games with the Americans to be named to the AHL's Second All-Star Team.

The Calgary Flames signed Wilson to a two-way deal for the 2011–12 season. He spent the majority of it with the Abbotsford Heat of the AHL, but appeared in five games with Calgary. He had a one-way deal with the Flames for 2012–13, but was expected to again spend most of the season in Abbotsford. Wilson instead chose to leave the Flames organization, signing with HC Donbass of the Kontinental Hockey League (KHL). The Flames terminated his NHL contract. He won the 2012–13 IIHF Continental Cup with HC Donbass and was named the best defender in the tournament. He was named best defender again in 2014.

Wilson was re-signed by Donbass to a further two-year contract extension, however with civil unrest in Ukraine forcing Donbass to suspend operations for the 2014–15 season, Wilson signed a one-year contract with expansion club, HC Sochi on July 1, 2014. He then had his contract renewed for a second season. Following the 2015-16 campaign, he left Sochi, moving on to fellow KHL outfit Severstal Cherepovets.

After moving to Sweden to play in the HockeyAllsvenskan with AIK IF for the 2017–18 season, Wilson ended his 13-year professional career in accepting an assistant coach role in a return to Donbas, Ukraine, with HC Donbass on October 16, 2018.

== Career statistics ==
=== Regular season and playoffs ===
			Regular season					Playoffs
Season	Team	League	GP	G	A	Pts	PIM	GP	G	A	Pts	PIM
2001–02	Michigan Tech	WCHA	38	4	8	12	18	—	—	—	—	—
2002–03	Michigan Tech	WCHA	38	8	17	25	37	—	—	—	—	—
2003–04	Michigan Tech	WCHA	37	2	11	13	22	—	—	—	—	—
2004–05	Michigan Tech	WCHA	35	3	4	7	42	—	—	—	—	—
2004–05	Muskegon Fury	UHL	14	3	3	6	2	17	0	2	2	8
2005–06	Muskegon Fury	UHL	13	3	9	12	9	—	—	—	—	—
2005–06	Grand Rapids Griffins	AHL	60	10	27	37	40	16	0	3	3	8
2006–07	Portland Pirates	AHL	79	9	34	43	52	—	—	—	—	—
2007–08	Portland Pirates	AHL	14	3	5	8	6	—	—	—	—	—
2007–08	Syracuse Crunch	AHL	57	11	28	39	29	13	2	5	7	4
2007–08	Columbus Blue Jackets	NHL	7	1	1	2	2	—	—	—	—	—
2008–09	Syracuse Crunch	AHL	33	8	12	20	6	—	—	—	—	—
2008–09	Columbus Blue Jackets	NHL	5	0	1	1	0	—	—	—	—	—
2008–09	Chicago Wolves	AHL	37	6	19	25	10	—	—	—	—	—
2008–09	Atlanta Thrashers	NHL	2	0	0	0	0	—	—	—	—	—
2009–10	Rochester Americans	AHL	75	14	46	60	58	7	2	0	2	22
2009–10	Florida Panthers	NHL	2	0	0	0	0	—	—	—	—	—
2010–11	Rochester Americans	AHL	66	12	36	48	24	—	—	—	—	—
2010–11	Florida Panthers	NHL	15	3	2	5	6	—	—	—	—	—
2011–12	Abbotsford Heat	AHL	66	16	27	43	41	8	2	4	6	12
2011–12	Calgary Flames	NHL	5	0	0	0	4	—	—	—	—	—
2012–13	HC Donbass	KHL	51	8	12	20	26	—	—	—	—	—
2013–14	HC Donbass	KHL	54	6	16	22	22	13	1	6	7	11
2014–15	HC Sochi	KHL	60	2	25	27	14	4	0	1	1	4
2015–16	HC Sochi	KHL	45	3	13	16	20	1	0	0	0	4
2016–17	Severstal Cherepovets	KHL	52	6	7	13	26	—	—	—	—	—
2017–18	AIK IF	Allsv	38	3	16	19	16	5	1	2	3	0
NHL totals			36	4	4	8	12	—	—	—	—	—

=== International ===
Year	Team	Event	Result	GP	G	A	Pts	PIM
2011	United States	WC	8th	7	0	2	2	0
Senior totals				7	0	2	2	0
