= 2017–18 Ukrainian Hockey League season =

- League: Ukrainian Hockey Championship
- Sport: Ice hockey
- Number of teams: 6

Regular season
- Regular season winners: HC Donbass

Playoffs

Finals
- Champions: HC Donbass
- Runners-up: HC Kremenchuk

Ukrainian Hockey League seasons
- ← 2016–17 2018–19 →

The 2017–18 Ukrainian Hockey League season was the 26th season of the Ukrainian Hockey Championship. Six teams participated in the league this season, and HC Donbass won the championship.

== Regular season ==
Pos	Team	Pld	W	OTW	OTL	L	GF	GA	GD	Pts	Final Result
1	HC Donbass	40	38	1	0	1	266	67	+199	116	Advance to play-off semi-finals
2	Bilyi Bars	40	27	0	3	10	199	105	+94	84	Advance to play-off semi-finals
3	HC Kremenchuk	40	23	2	2	13	164	120	+44	75	Advance to play-off quarter-finals
4	Dynamo Kharkiv	40	16	1	1	22	155	168	−13	51	Advance to play-off quarter-finals
5	Halytski Levy	40	7	2	0	31	83	211	−128	25	Advance to play-off quarter-finals
6	Vovky Brovary	40	3	0	0	37	98	294	−196	9	Advance to play-off quarter-finals

Source: UHL

== Play-off ==
=== Bracket ===
Quarter-finals
4	Dynamo Kharkiv	6
5	Halytski Levy	5
3	HC Kremenchuk	10
6	Vovky Brovary	4

Semi-finals
1	HC Donbass	3
4	Dynamo Kharkiv	0
2	Bilyi Bars	0
3	HC Kremenchuk	3

Final
1	HC Donbass	4
3	HC Kremenchuk	1

=== Quarter-finals ===
- Dynamo Kharkiv – Halytski Levy 6:5 (2:2, 4:3)
- HC Kremenchuk – Vovky Brovary 10:4 (5:1, 5:3)

=== Semi-finals ===
- HC Donbass – Dynamo Kharkiv 3:0 (6:2, 9:0, 9:2)
- Bilyi Bars – HC Kremenchuk 0:3 (1:2 OT, 3:5, 4:5 OT)

=== Final ===
- HC Donbass – HC Kremenchuk 4:1 (3:0, 6:3, 3:4, 5:2, 3:0)
