= Oleksandr Materukhin =

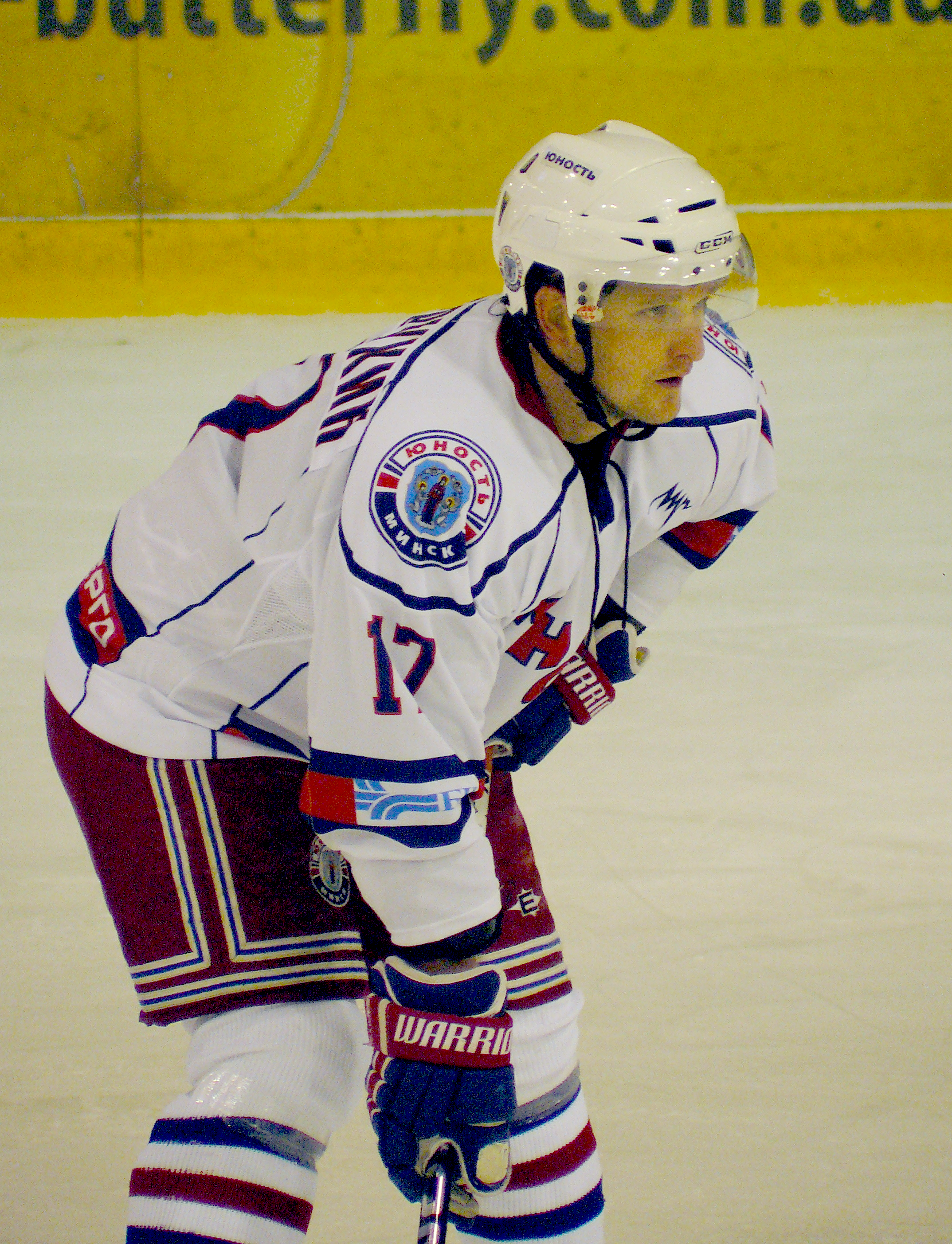
- Born: 17 October 1981 (age 44) Kyiv, Ukrainian SSR, Soviet Union
- Height: 6 ft 0 in (183 cm)
- Weight: 201 lb (91 kg; 14 st 5 lb)
- Position: Right wing
- Shot: Right
- VHL team Former teams: HC Yugra; Houston Aeros; HK Mogilev; Yunost Minsk; HC Donbass; Neman Grodno; Dinamo Minsk; Shakhtyor Soligorsk; Dinamo-Molodechno
- National team: Ukraine and Belarus
- NHL draft: Undrafted
- Playing career: 2002–2021

Oleksandr Ivanovych Materukhin (Ukrainian: Олександр Іванович Матерухін; born 17 October 1981) is a Ukrainian Belarusian professional former ice hockey right winger. He formerly played with Belarusian club, HC Dinamo Minsk of the Kontinental Hockey League (KHL). Internationally he played for both Ukraine and Belarus.

== Career statistics ==
=== Regular season and playoffs ===
			Regular season					Playoffs
Season	Team	League	GP	G	A	Pts	PIM	GP	G	A	Pts	PIM
1998–99	Sokil-Kyiv-2	EEHL	16	5	8	13	8	—	—	—	—	—
1999–00	Acadie-Bathurst Titan	QMJHL	57	21	28	49	47	4	0	1	1	21
2000–01	Acadie-Bathurst Titan	QMJHL	59	25	34	59	127	19	6	11	17	46
2001–02	Des Moines Buccaneers	USHL	59	37	26	63	154	3	2	4	6	6
2002–03	Richmond Renegades	ECHL	69	13	13	26	70	—	—	—	—	—
2003–04	Louisiana IceGators	ECHL	67	27	34	61	128	6	0	3	3	31
2003–04	Houston Aeros	AHL	2	0	0	0	0	—	—	—	—	—
2004–05	Louisiana IceGators	ECHL	28	5	6	11	38	—	—	—	—	—
2004–05	Pensacola Ice Pilots	ECHL	44	11	21	32	54	4	0	0	0	12
2005–06	Khimvolokno Mogilev	Belarus	50	30	15	45	134	9	2	6	8	4
2006–07	Khimvolokno Mogilev	Belarus	48	22	27	49	56	4	2	2	4	6
2007–08	Yunost Minsk	Belarus	52	26	14	40	73	11	3	4	7	20
2008–09	Yunost Minsk	Belarus	51	17	24	41	79	15	7	4	11	14
2009–10	Yunost Minsk	Belarus	52	32	40	72	99	13	6	4	10	14
2010–11	Yunost Minsk	Belarus	51	30	41	71	28	13	8	11	19	18
2011–12	Donbass Donetsk	VHL	53	14	21	35	48	10	1	1	2	33
2012–2013	Donbass Donetsk	KHL	24	10	31	41	14	6	2	5	7	4
2012–13	HC Donbass-2	Ukraine	9	2	5	7	6	11	8	7	15	10
2013–14	Neman Grodno	Belarus	13	15	10	25	36	—	—	—	—	—
2013–14	Dynamo Minsk	KHL	41	14	3	17	16	—	—	—	—	—
2014–15	Dynamo Minsk	KHL	36	11	3	14	8	5	0	0	0	4
2014–15	Shakhter Soligorsk	Belarus	19	20	8	28	41	—	—	—	—	—
2015–16	Dinamo Minsk	KHL	53	6	9	15	34	—	—	—	—	—
2016–17	Dinamo Minsk	KHL	59	22	15	37	65	4	0	2	2	16
2017–18	Dinamo Minsk	KHL	24	0	5	5	20	—	—	—	—	—
2017–18	Dinamo Molodechno	Belarus	8	2	3	5	0	—	—	—	—	—
2017–18	Shakhter Soligorsk	Belarus	14	7	6	13	9	5	4	1	5	2
AHL totals			2	0	0	0	0	—	—	—	—	—
ECHL totals			208	56	74	130	290	10	0	3	3	43
