= HC Donbass-2 =

Donbass-2
- City: Donetsk
- League: Professional Hockey League (2011–2013)
- Founded: 2011
- Folded: 2013
- Home arena: Leader Arena (ЛСК "Лідер") (capacity: 500)
- Colours
- Owner(s): (Ukraine) Borys Kolesnikov
- General manager: (Ukraine) Serhiy Shakurov
- Affiliates: HC Donbass (KHL); Donetsk Bears (junior)
- Website: HCDonbass.com

Franchise history
- Hockey Club Donbass-2

Hockey Club Donbass-2 (Russian: ХК Донбасс-2; Ukrainian: Хокейний Клуб Донбас-2, tr. Khokeinyi Klub Donbas-2), was a Ukrainian Professional Hockey League club based in Donetsk. They were a founding member of the Professional Hockey League of Ukraine, winning the league's first two championships. The team takes its name from its geographic location in the heart of the Donets Basin (Donbas). Donbass-2 was an affiliate of the Kontinental Hockey League (KHL)'s HC Donbass before being replaced by farm teams Bilyi Bars in the PHL and the Molodaya Gvardia in the Minor Hockey League.

== Franchise history ==
Donbass-2 was created following the split of HC Donbass, following its joining of the Russian Major League (VHL) and the creation of the Professional Hockey League (PHL) of Ukraine. In its first season, Donbass-2 acted as a farm team for the parent Donbass club, finishing 2nd in the inaugural PHL regular season, and captured the national championship in the playoffs, defeating Sokil Kyiv in the finals with the aid of Oleksandr Materukhin and Stepan Goryachevskikh from the parent club; who had also defeated Sokil for the national title the prior season. Following HC Donbass' announcement of joining the Kontinental Hockey League, team owner and president Borys Kolesnikov announced that Donbass-2 would continue to act as a farm team for the KHL team. Moreover, the team would place an emphasis on the development of junior ice hockey players, limiting the roster to those under the age of 25, with focus on 17- to 21-year-olds.

The team was dissolved in 2013 following their second PHL championship in a win against HC Kompanion-Naftogaz. Bilyi Bars would assume Donbass-2's role as farm-team affiliate in the PHL, while Molodaya Gvardia would act as HC Donbass' junior affiliate in the MHL.

== Team identity ==
=== Logo ===
The modern Donbass logo features prominently two spoil tips, which represent the city's strong ties to the steel and coal mining industry. The white script is meant to symbolize "a blank page".

Current logo, 2011–Present

== Team awards ==
- (Ukraine) Ukrainian Hockey Championship
  - Winners (2): 2012, 2013

== Players ==
=== Team captains ===
- (Ukraine) Artem Bondarev, 2011–2012
- (Russia) Vitaly Anikeyev, 2012–2013

=== Head coaches ===
- (Russia) Sergei Petrov, 2011
- (Belarus) Aleh Mikulchik, 2011–2013
