= Haydamaky =

Haydamaky may refer to:

- Haydamaks, 18th-century Ukrainian rebels against the Polish nobility
- Haydamaky (band), a Ukrainian folk-rock band formed in 1991
- "Haydamaky" (poem), an 1841 poem by Taras Shevchenko
- Vinnytski Haidamaky, Ukrainian ice hockey team
