= Ukrainian Championship =

Ukrainian Championship may refer to:

- Ukrainian Chess Championship, a Ukrainian national chess competition
- Ukrainian Premier League, a Ukrainian football league
- Ukrainian Hockey Championship, the national championship tournament of Ukrainian ice hockey
- Professional Hockey League, a Ukrainian hockey league
