= HC Donbass =

Donbass
- Nickname: The Red & Black; Donbas Donetsk
- City: Druzhkivka (2015-22); Donetsk (2005–14)
- League: Ukrainian Hockey League
- Founded: December 2005
- Home arena: Altajir Drużkiwka Arena (capacity: 400)
- Colours
- Owner: (Ukraine) Borys Kolesnikov
- General manager: (Ukraine) Aleksei Braga
- Head coach: (Ukraine) Serhiy Viter
- Captain: (Ukraine) Artyom Bondarev
- Website: HCDonbass.com

Franchise history
- Hockey Club Donbass

Hockey Club Donbass (Ukrainian: Хокейний Клуб Донбас, romanized: Hokeinyi Klub Donbas) is a Ukrainian professional ice hockey team based in Druzhkivka, that played in the Ukrainian Hockey League and briefly the KHL.

HC Donbass is a six time Ukrainian champion (2011, 2012, 2013, 2016, 2017, 2018). The team was a member of the Kontinental Hockey League (KHL) during the 2012–13 and 2013–14 seasons, and was the sole representative from Ukraine competing at the elite international level. Due to the war in Donbas, the team did not compete in the 2014–15 KHL season.

Borys Kolesnikov, a prominent Ukrainian politician and businessman, purchased the team in 2010, and from then until 2014 it was the most successful hockey club in Ukraine. The team takes its name from its geographic location in the heart of the Donets Basin (Donbas).

The club was founded in 2005 as Hockey Club Kolbiko-Donetsk and took part in the XIV Ukrainian Championship by competing in the First League. After three years of competing only in tournament play, the club returned to the Ukrainian Hockey Championship, and ascended to the Ukrainian Major League. In its fourth seasons of national competition beginning in 2008, the franchise won its first national title in 2011, before joining the Supreme Hockey League (VHL). The team also won the 2012–13 IIHF Continental Cup, becoming the first team from Ukraine to do so. Following the 2010–11 season, Donbass split into two teams with their affiliate, Donbass-2, representing the organization in the Professional Hockey League of Ukraine. Donbass-2 won its first title in 2012 during the inaugural PHL season, and its second title the following season for the organization. In 2013, Bilyi Bars began acting as HC Donbass's PHL affiliate, dissolving Donbass-2.

Their second arena, in Druzhkivka, was bombed by Russia on 2 January 2023.

== Franchise history ==
=== Origins ===
The Donbass Hockey Club founded as a successor to the original Donbass team formed in June 2001 in Sievierodonetsk. This original team, in turn, was a spiritual successor to previous Donetsk teams KOOPERATOR (from 1990) and NORD (from 1993). Players from Kharkiv and Kyiv were invited to the team, among them there were D. Pashinsky, D. Gnyt'ko, A. Kalitka, D. Klyuchko, O. Timchenko. The original Donbass club made its first appearance in 2001, participating in Belarus' entry division and the Major League of the Ukrainian Hockey Championship, earning bronze medals in each league's finals. However, shortly thereafter, the team would dissolve. Following the team's dissolution, most former Donbass players would go on to join Khimik Sievierodonetsk of the Ukrainian Major League.

=== Founding and competitions (2005–2009) ===
In December 2005 the team was re-founded by a group of local Donetsk players, then playing in Sievierodonetsk, who wanted to represent Donetsk within the league. The club was created under the name HC Donetsk-Kolbiko (Ukrainian: Донецьк-Колбіко), (after the team's sponsor, Kolbiko Meats), and applied for participation as a professional team in the First League, a division of the annual Ukrainian Hockey Championship. A lack of artificial ice in Donetsk forced the team to practice on a lake in Yasynuvata. The two-game competition took place between January 31 and February 3, 2006, and on only three weeks of practice, the team still managed to top its respective division, and win the finals match against the Kharkiv Olympic Reserve Sports School (SDYuSShOR). Donbass would lose to ATEK Kyiv in the following playoff, failing to earn promotion to Major League. Between 2006 and 2008, First League play was cancelled, but the team did compete in a series of tournaments and re-adopted the original Donbass club name, crest, and colours.

During the autumn of 2007, the new ice arena "Leader" was built in Donetsk. The team had practice and home games there. Under the guidance of G. Kravchenko (later D. Gordyushin) children's sports school restarted its work. This year HC Donbass took part in Ukraine Hockey Cup and took up the 5th place among 6 teams. The same year in May HC "Donbass" got the invitation to take part in "Trade Point" tournament, which was held in Dnipropetrovsk.

In 2008 the team returned to competition in the Ukrainian Hockey Championship, participating in the Eastern Division of the Ukrainian Major League; finishing 1st and leading the division in all offensive categories. Donbass was able to sweep HC Verony in the qualifying round, and Ekspres Lviv due to forfeiture, but were themselves swept by HC Kharkiv 2–0.

=== Kolesnikov ownership and the Major League (2009–2011) ===
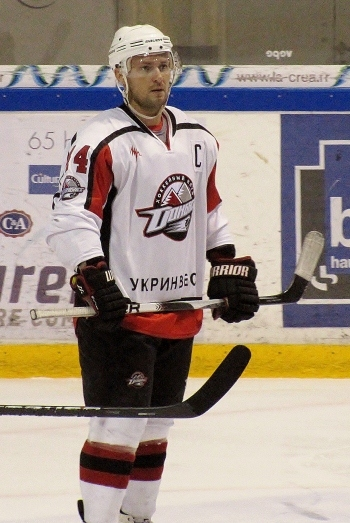
Serhiy Varlamov was named to the 2012 All-Ukrainian All Star Team for his play with Donbass

In 2009 the club's management invited Andrey Ovchinnikov (a former player of Sokil Kyiv) to the position of head coach. The team finished in 5th place at the Ukrainian championship, and Ovchinnikov's contract wasn't extended.

Fortunes for the club changed in 2010 when owner and prominent Ukrainian businessman Borys Kolesnikov gained full control of the team, making them the most financially secure team in the history of Ukrainian hockey. The first influential addition to the club after this change in management was former Sokil Kyiv head coach, Aleksandr Kulikov, in the summer of 2010. He came with Anatoliy Dyomin, his partner from Sokil Kyiv, and Sergey Viter from Donetsk. Under the leadership of this coach trio, HC Donbass began to play in a new way, surpassing all expectations with a record-breaking 27 wins in the Ukrainian Hockey Championship. Under Kulikov, the team broke the previous record for most consecutive wins in the Ukrainian championship as well. This year, Donbass was capable of sweeping HC Kharkiv in the first round of the best-of-three playoff series, and would go on to upset Sokil by sweeping them in the finals, with scores of 1–0 and 3–2. With the win, Donbass became the first non-Kyiv-based team to win the national title and began a new era of Donetsk as the epicentre of Ukrainian hockey.

Following the 2011 Ukrainian League season, Donbass applied for and was given membership to the Russian Major League. A vast majority of the championship winning roster from the 2010–11 season were cut from the team as it rebuilt for its first year in the VHL. While the primary team would compete in Russia, Donbass also iced a team in the newly formed Professional Hockey League of Ukraine, Donbass-2. Like its parent club the year prior, Donbass-2 secured the second consecutive national title for the franchise, again defeating Sokil in the final.

In July 2011, Donbass trained for the upcoming season in Ontario and held an exhibition game against the Ontario Hockey League all-star team. Donbass won the fight-filled game 4–1 and was reported to have garnered overwhelming fan support from the local Ukrainian diaspora, accounting for approximately 500 of the 550 in attendance.

The title also secured the club's entry into the 2011–12 IIHF Continental Cup, the third round of which was hosted in Donetsk. Donbass secured a place in the Super Final, falling to the host Dragons de Rouen in the final game 5–2. Vladimir Malevich of Donbass took home honors as the best defenseman of the tournament.

=== Supreme Hockey League (2011–12 season) ===
The Supreme Hockey League (VHL) accepted HC Donbass to a non-commercial partnership in the league on May the 31st 2011. HC Donbass became the first domestic club in independent Ukraine history to have full-fledged days-long training sessions abroad, at the "Tin Ranch" center in Ontario, Canada. There, HC Donbass has won against the Ontario HL all-star team twice. A month later, in Donetsk, the club organized and held an international tournament, the "Donbass Open Cup", where three KHL clubs took part.

On September 23, 2011, owner Borys Kolesnikov elevated his role to that of team president over Serhiy Shakurov, who had held the role with the club since its inception. The year the club played in the VHL resulted in a third-place finish in the regular season and a semifinal loss against Toros Neftekamsk who went on to become the champions.

=== Kontinental Hockey League (2012–2014) ===
On April 23, Slovak specialist Július Šupler became the head coach of HC Donbass. In July 2012 the management of the KHL accepted HC Donbass. Because of lockout NHL-2012, Ukrainian players Ruslan Fedotenko, Alexey Ponikarovsky and Anton Babchuk replenished the club's membership. Afterwards twice Stanley Cup winner Ruslan Fedotenko became the captain of the team.

Donbass played its first KHL game on September 6, 2012, at Slovan Bratislava, winning 4–2. Evgeny Belukhin scored the first goal in Donbass's KHL history. Following the season the team hosted the 2013 KHL junior draft.

In January 2013, HC Donbass won the 2012–13 IIHF Continental Cup as first Ukrainian club. Within the super final in Donetsk on the January 11 to 13, the champions of Ukraine HC Donbass beat Metallurg Zhlobin from Belarus with a score of 1–0, Bolzano Foxes from Italy with a score of 3–0, and Dragons de Rouen from France with a score of 7–1 and got a total of 9 points. As a result of its first regular season in KHL the club got the 9th stage in the West and fetched up to play-off.

In the 2013-14 KHL season, Donbass moved from the Bobrov to the Tarasov division. The Russian specialist Andrey Nazarov was in charge of Donetsk team. On September 10, 2013, Alexey Braga was assigned to the position of the HC Donbass GM. At the end of the regular season Donbass finished 4th in the Western Conference, and qualified to the playoffs of the Gagarin Cup for the first time. Donbass also set a KHL record for the fewest goals against in a regular season with 99. In the first round, Donbass defeated Dinamo Riga 4 games to 3 before falling to Lev Prague in the Western Conference Semi-finals 4 games to 2. In the second game of the series with Lev, the teams set a record for the longest game in the history of the Kontinental Hockey League. The game was won 4–3 by Donbass, and lasted for 126 minutes and 13 seconds before Evgeny Belukhin scored the winning goal. Due to political events occurring in Ukraine at the time, the third and fourth games of the series, scheduled for Donetsk, were played in Bratislava. The series returned to Donetsk for Game 6, which Lev won 1–0 to finish Donbass's season. At the end of the season HC Donbass was named the 2013 Best Sports Club of Ukraine at the Heroes of Sports Year awards.

On the night of May 26, 2014, because of the armed conflict in eastern Ukraine, the home arena of the club was looted, vandalized and set on fire. Windows and equipment were destroyed. HC Donbass initially expected the arena to be reconditioned within 90 days and fully restored by the start of the KHL season, which never happened. The arena was subsequently condemned.

=== Suspension of operations (2014–15 season) ===
On June 18, 2014, the KHL President Alexander Medvedev met with the management of Donbass to discuss the team's situation. The parties agreed that HC Donbass would take a one-year "stop-out" from operations. The team bought an equity stake in the league and, as a result, would theoretically be guaranteed a place in the competition for the 2015–16 season, although the ongoing War in Donbass combined with the league's financial situation leave the future uncertain. In order to ensure the team's ability to compete upon its return, all rosters and contracts have been frozen. Players and coaches affected by the suspension were permitted to sign one-year contracts with other clubs but otherwise remain under contract to Donbass. Donbass's new home, Kalmius Arena, would contain 12,800 of spectators for hockey. It was initially expected to be operational by the 2014–15 season, which never happened too although the project is currently on hold.

=== Resumed operation (2015–16 season) ===
Instead of rejoining the KHL, the club and the Ice Hockey Federation of Ukraine (FHU) signed a contract about the participation of the team in the Ukrainian Hockey Extra League in the 2015–16 season. The team now plays their home games at the Altair Arena, in Druzhkivka, 90 km from Donetsk. Anatoliy Stepanischev became the head coach of the club and Evgeniy Brul' the coach of goalkeepers. Sergey Petrov became the general manager of the team.

After pre-season training session in Svyatogorsk (Donetsk region), the team arrived to Druzhkivka for preparation prior to the Ukrainian Hockey Extra League 2015–16 season. The pre-season tournament Donbass Open Cup was organized for the 4th in the club history. Among the players in the team during the pre-season tournament, were Sergey Varlamov, Denis Kochetkov and Viktor Zaharov. Donbass won the Cup, by winning over the teams HC Bilyi Bars, HC Vityaz Kharkiv and HC Kremenchuk.

Prior to the 2015–16 Ukrainian Hockey Extra League season, Donbass had conducted three sparrings in Latvia, playing towards local teams HC Mogo, HC Zemgale and Kurbads, winning two out of three games. On September 26 the club held its first match within the scope of the national championship, which also involved another seven teams this season. Before the New Year Anatoliy Stepanichev's team also held two unofficial games abroad in Belarus and finished that year being in the top of the Ukrainian championship table.

HC Donbass continued to lead in the regular season, and at the same time having renewed club record of the greatest wins. Within the scope of away game, HC Yunost Kharkiv was beaten with a score of 27–1. The club won the regular season, with the nearest competitor 7 points behind. The semi-final playoff series against HC Vityaz Kharkiv, Donbass completed for the minimum three games (5–2, 6–1 and 3–1). In the final of season Donetsk team had to play against the second team of the regular season – HC Generals Kiev. In the final, Donbass won in four straight games (2–1, 3–2, 2–1 and 3–1) and became champions of the year.

=== 2016–17 season ===
Within the pre-season training session HC Donbass took part in some domestic and international competitions. Within the period from 11 until August 13 the team played on Kremenchuk Open Cup, from 18 until 20 – on the Pavel Zaboynik Memorial and on August 25–28 it held the traditional domestic competition Donbass Open Cup in Druzhkovka.

5 Ukrainian clubs took part in this fifth draw of Donbass Open Cup – HC Biliy Bars, HC Vityaz, HC Kremenchuk, HC Krivbass and HC Donbass. Teams played 10 games in total.

With 12 points gained in four games HC Donbass became the winner and saved the cup at home.

In the season 2016–17 HC "Donbass" takes part in Ukrainian Hockey League championship. The starting match of the season took place on September 9, 2016. On the ice of Altair arena in Druzhkovka the champion of the last season HC Donbass met silver medalists – HC Generals, Kyiv. The match ended with the score 4–0 in favor of the Donetsk "Donbass".

On June 6, 2016, in Budapest a meeting of representatives of the teams participating in the 20th draw of the IIHF Continental Cup was held. Due to this meeting HC Donbass learned their first opponents. "Donbass" started with a semi-final round, which was held in Denmark from November 18 to 20. French "Ange", Danish "Odense" and champion of the British elite league season 2015/16 "Nottingham Panthers" was the opponents of HC Donbass.Performance in the group D «Donbass" finished in third place.

On December 21, 2016 "Donbass" became the first club UHL, which guaranteed itself place in the play-off round of the championship. On February 5, 2017, the contract between HC "Donbass" and the coaching staff, who led the 56-year-old Anatoly Stepanishev, was to terminate by mutual agreement of the parties.

On February 12, 48-year-old Igor Chibirev entered the coaching staff, and on February 21, a 54-year-old specialist from Latvia Andrejs Matzins. They became assistants to the acting head coach Serhiy Viter. On March 6, Serhiy Viter became the head coach of the hockey club "Donbass". The contract with the 42-year-old Ukrainian specialist was concluded for two years.

On March 9, "Donbass" began the semifinal series of the playoffs UHL against "Kryvbas" Krivoy Rog. In a series of four wins, "Donbass" took 5 matches to beat the club from Krivoy Rog (4–0, 3–2 OT, 3–4, 3–0, 5–2). The opponents of Donetsk in the final was "Kremenchuk". In a tense confrontation with the team from the Poltava region, "Donbass" with a total score 4–2 (3–1, 3–4 OT, 3–1, 2–1, 1–4, 2–1) became five-time champions of Ukraine, and Serhiy Viter first tried on a gold medal as head coach.

== Ice hockey school ==
Children's ice hockey and figure skating sports school was opened on September 22, 2008, after Ice Sports Complex "Leader". On December 29, 2011, the Ice Sports Complex Almaz was opened. The goals of the children's ice hockey and figure skating sports school are to attract children and youth to winter sports activities, to hold their sports events and to train high performing sportsmen for different teams. On June 19, 2013, Donbass youth team Molodaya Gvardia was admitted into the Junior Hockey League and, starting from 2013 to 2014 season the team plays in Junior Hockey League Championship. Due to the aggravation of the conflict in the East of Ukraine, Molodaya Gvardia went on vacation, which lasted at least for one year.

In 2014–15 season HC Donbass children's sports school has started work in Altair ice arena (Druzhkivka). Since September 1, 2014, more than 900 children from 5 to 12 years old from Sloviansk, Kramatorsk, Druzhkivka and Kostiantynivka have been involved with the sports school. They start at the school for figure skating and ice hockey without payment. The club provided each of the young sportsmen with the necessary equipment, qualified coaching staff and comfortable buses that bring and take away children to ice arena "Altair" and back to their communities. The intake of children was going on in 2015.

In the 2015–16 season, three teams of HC Donbass children's sports school were moved to "Terminal" ice arena base to Brovary. Such a change in the permanent training places was due to the participation of the Donbass 2003, Donbass 2004 and Donbass 2005 teams in Belarus championships and respective budget reduction for visiting the out matches of the tournament. The biggest part of Ice hockey school continuing its activity in Druzhkivka, with adding more than 300 pupils to the hockey and figure skating groups.

In season 2015/16 Youth Sports School HC "Donbass" has done a lot of work, aimed at the education of children, their high-quality professional development. During the year teams of the Youth Sports School HC "Donbass" held more than 250 official matches on the domestic and international arena. They took part in 25 tournaments, 12 of which came out victorious.

Older teams of the youth sports school of Donetsk club "Donbass 2003", "Donbass 2004" won the championship in Ukraine, "Donbass 2005" – Open Championship of Kyiv, also they won the group "B" in the championship of Belarus. The sportsman of the section of figure skating Youth Sports School HC "Donbass" Valery Karasev won the Open Cup of Ukraine.

In the season 2016/17 years Youth Sports School HC "Donbass" continues its work on the basis of the ice arena "Altair" (Druzhkovka), and Arena "Terminal" in Brovary.

The season 2016/17 was a new round of school club. After last year's victory in the championship of Belarus in group B "Donbass 2003" and "Donbass 2004" started in the competition in Group A. "Donbass 2005", debuted in the championship U-12 in Ukraine. In Belarus Gorki "Donbass 2007" in the final match with a score of 4:2 beat compatriots from "Legion." At the international figure skating tournament Vinnitsa Trophy 2016 was attended by 12 of our students under the direction of Natalia Gordeeva, Tatiana and Igor Vystavkin malaria. From Vinnitsa our skaters brought four medals - three gold and one bronze. In 2017, Ice Hockey School has expanded its geography. Jan. 22 children of Bakhmut made the first steps on the ice. And on February 5 were joined by young athletes of the Pokrovsk and Myrnohrad. The end of the season turned out to be especially successful for the team of Children's Sports School "Donbass" in 2004 - Donbass 2004 became the champion of Ukraine, and also the bronze medalist of the Open Championship of Belarus.

== Team identity ==
=== Logo ===
The team's original colours of 2001 were blue and grey and featured a logo representing a hockey puck, with a hockey stick overlain. On November 14, 2008, the club changed their logo and team colours to the current scheme of red, black, and white. As part of this change, the team's name was changed from the Ukrainian spelling (Хокейний Клуб Донбас, Khokeinyi Klub Donbas) to Russian (Хоккейный Клуб Донбасс, Khokkeynyi Klub Donbass). The team again altered its logo in 2010, where it remains currently. The modern Donbass logos feature prominently two spoil tips, which represent the city's strong ties to the steel and coal mining industry. The change from a metallic script to white is meant to symbolize "a blank page".

Original Donbass logo, in English, 2001–02, 2006–08

Second Donbass logo, in Russian, 2008–11

Current logo, 2011–present

== Honours ==
=== Ukraine ===
- (Ukraine) Ukrainian Hockey Championship Regular Season
  - Winners (4): 2010–11, 2015–16, 2017–18, 2018–19
- (Ukraine) Ukrainian Hockey Championship Trophy
  - Winners (8): 2011, 2012*, 2013*, 2016, 2017, 2018, 2019, 2021

*The 2012 and 2013 titles were won as HC Donbass-2.

=== Europe ===
- (Europe) IIHF Continental Cup
  - Winners (1): 2012–13
  - Runners-up (1): 2013–14
  - Third place (1): 2011–12

=== Individual honours ===
Ukrainian Ice Hockey Player of the Year

- (Ukraine) Oleksandr Materukhin(2011)
- (Ukraine) Ruslan Fedotenko (2012)

Slovak Goalkeeper of the Year

- (Slovakia) Ján Laco (2012)

== Team roster ==
As of the 30 June 2017

Goalkeepers
#	Country	Player	Date of birth
30	Ukraine	Bogdan Dyachenko	October 6, 1998
31	Ukraine	Vladislav Gurko	June 23, 2000
72	Ukraine	Maxim Duve	February 18, 2000
Defencemen
#	Country	Name	Date of birth
2	Ukraine	Alexander Firsov	June 27, 1999
5	Ukraine	Kiril Zhovnir	March 7, 1997
7	Ukraine	Alexander Vlad	April 20, 1997
29	Ukraine	Aleksandr Alexandrov	April 22, 1997
57	Ukraine	Filipp Matviyenko	October 21, 1997
70	Ukraine	Andrey Grigoriev	February 7, 1998
71	Ukraine	Stanislav Ordynskyi	July 26, 1998
Forwards
#	Country	Name	Date of birth
3	Ukraine	Vladislav Luhovyi	August 1, 1995
6	Ukraine	Nikita Kovalenko	February 4, 1998
8	Ukraine	Ivan Savchenko	March 19, 1993
10	Ukraine	Vadim Mazur	February 17, 1998
17	Ukraine	Sergei Kuzmik	June 17, 1995
18	Ukraine	Denis Mostovyi	September 22, 1998
19	Ukraine	Olexei Vorona	August 17, 1997
22	Ukraine	Yaroslav Svishchev	March 12, 1997
45	Ukraine	Viktor Zakharov	January 8, 1994
55	Belarus	Ilya Korenchuk	January 13, 1995
78	Ukraine	Anton Ruban	August 7, 1998

=== Team captains ===
- (Ukraine) Vitaliy Bychkov, 2008–2010
- (Ukraine) Oleh Novikov, September 2010
- (Ukraine) Dmytro Isayenko, 2010–2011
- (Ukraine) Serhiy Varlamov, 2011–2012
- Rotating captains, 2012–13
  - (Ukraine) Serhiy Varlamov, August–October 2012
  - (Slovakia) Jaroslav Obšut, October–November 2012
  - (Ukraine) Ruslan Fedotenko, November 2012 – January 2013
  - (Czech Republic) Václav Nedorost, January–April 2013
- (Russia) Oleg Piganovich, August–October 2013 (Interim)
- (Ukraine) Ruslan Fedotenko, 2013–2014

=== Head coaches ===
- (Ukraine) Mykola Timko, 2001–2002
- (Ukraine) Ivan Polischuk, 2008–2009
- (Ukraine) Andriy Ovchinnikov, 2009–2010
- (Russia) Aleksandr Kulikov, 2010–12
- (Slovakia) Július Šupler, 2012–2013
- (Russia) Andrei Nazarov, 2013–2014
- (Ukraine) Anatoli Stepanischev, 2015–2017
- (Ukraine) Serhiy Viter, 2017–present

=== KHL draft picks ===
	Player	Hometown	Origin	Drafted from	Year	Round	Overall	Ref
D	Hampus Lindholm	Helsingborg	Sweden	Rögle BK	2012	1	30	
C	Erik Karlsson	Lerum	Sweden	Frölunda HC	2012	2	68	
C	Egor Morozov	Tolyatti	Russia	HC Lada	2012	3	104	
C	Henri Ikonen	Savonlinna	Finland	KalPa	2012	4	131	
D	Vladimir Abashkin	Izhevsk	Russia	HC Metallurg Mg.	2012	5	165	
D	Roman Khalikov	Oskemen	Kazakhstan	Irbis Kazan	2013	1	15	
F	Ulib-Gleb Berezovskyy	Kyiv	Ukraine	Mannheim U18	2013	4	115	
F	Pavel Zacha	Brno	Czech Republic	HC Bílí Tygři Liberec	2014	2	82	
