= 2012 Professional Hockey League All-Star Game =

2012 PHL All-Star Game
	1	2	3	Total
Foreign Stars	5	5	2	12
Ukrainian Stars	4	5	5	14
- Date: 22 January 2012 13:00 UTC
- Arena: Palace of Sports
- City: Kyiv, Ukraine

The 2012 Professional Hockey League All-Star Game (Ukrainian: Матч Зірок, romanized: Match Zirok) was the first All-star game for the 2011–12 season of the Professional Hockey League (PHL). It took place on 22 January 2012 13:00 UTC at the Palace of Sports in Kyiv, Ukraine.

== See also ==
- Professional Hockey League
