= Ján Laco =

Slovak ice hockey goaltender (born 1981)

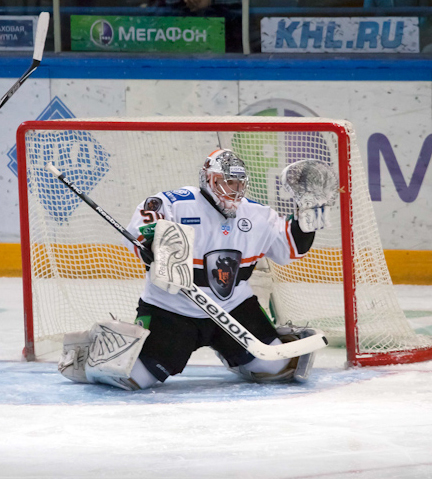
- Ján Laco with Lev Poprad in 2012
- Born: 1 December 1981 (age 44) Liptovský Mikuláš, Czechoslovakia
- Height: 6 ft 0 in (183 cm)
- Weight: 190 lb (86 kg; 13 st 8 lb)
- Position: Goaltender
- Catches: Left
- Played for: MHk 32 Liptovský Mikuláš; HKm Zvolen; HK Nitra; Lev Poprad; Donbass Donetsk; Barys Astana; Piráti Chomutov; HC Sparta Praha; HC Košice
- National team: Slovakia
- NHL draft: Undrafted
- Playing career: 2000–present

Ján Laco (Slovak pronunciation: [ˈjaːn ˈlatsɔ]; born 1 December 1981) is a former Slovak ice hockey goaltender.

== Career ==
He won the 2012–13 IIHF Continental Cup with HC Donbass and was named the best goaltender in the tournament. On June 30, 2014, Laco signed one-year contract with Barys Astana.

== International play ==
Medal record

Ice hockey

Representing Slovakia

World Championships
Silver medal – second place	2012 Finland/Sweden	

He played for Slovakia at the 2012 Ice Hockey World Championships where he won a silver medal and was named the tournament's top goaltender. Laco was named Slovak goaltender of the year in 2012 and best World Championship 2012 Goalie. Laco was also chosen to the Slovak squad for the Ice hockey at the 2014 Winter Olympics, and took part in one group stage game, the last group stage game against Russia. Slovakia lost the game on penalties, but Laco got a lot of positive comments for his game and the big number of saves he made. Laco also took part in the 5-3 loss game to the Czech Republic.
