= 2011–12 IIHF Continental Cup =

The Continental Cup 2011–12 was the 15th edition of the IIHF Continental Cup. The season started on September 30, 2011, and finished on January 15, 2012.

The Super Final was played in Rouen, France on the 13–15 January 2012.

The points system used in this tournament was: the winner in regular time won 3 points, the loser 0 points; in case of a tie, an overtime and a penalty shootout is played, the winner in penalty shootouts or overtime won 2 points and the loser won 1 point.

== First Group Stage ==
=== Group A ===
(Ankara, Turkey)

Team #1	Score	Team #2
Başkent Yıldızları (Turkey)	1:16	(Belgium) White Caps Turnhout
Başkent Yıldızları (Turkey)	2:11	(Estonia) Tartu Kalev-Välk
White Caps Turnhout (Belgium)	5:2	(Estonia) Tartu Kalev-Välk

=== Group A standings ===
Rank	Team	Points
1	(Belgium) White Caps Turnhout	6
2	(Estonia) Tartu Kalev-Välk	3
3	(Turkey) Başkent Yıldızları	0

- Note: HC Metulla of Israel was scheduled to compete, however they decided to retire from the tournament.

== Second Group Stage ==
=== Group B ===
(Dunaújváros, Hungary)

Team #1	Score	Team #2
White Caps Turnhout (Belgium)	7:3	(Spain) CH Jaca
DAB-Docler (Hungary)	1:3	(Netherlands) HYS The Hague
White Caps Turnhout (Belgium)	5:3	(Netherlands) HYS The Hague
DAB-Docler (Hungary)	7:1	(Spain) CH Jaca
HYS The Hague (Netherlands)	11:1	(Spain) CH Jaca
DAB-Docler (Hungary)	9:4	(Belgium) White Caps Turnhout

=== Group B standings ===
Rank	Team	Points
1	(Hungary) DAB-Docler	6 (+3)
2	(Netherlands) HYS The Hague	6 (0)
3	(Belgium) White Caps Turnhout	6 (-3)
4	(Spain) CH Jaca	0

=== Group C ===
(Miercurea Ciuc, Romania)

Team #1	Score	Team #2
HK Liepājas Metalurgs (Latvia)	3:2 (SO)	(Kazakhstan) Beibarys Atyrau
HSC Csíkszereda (Romania)	8:3	(Slovenia) HDD Olimpija Ljubljana
HK Liepājas Metalurgs (Latvia)	11:1	(Slovenia) HDD Olimpija Ljubljana
HSC Csíkszereda (Romania)	1:5	(Kazakhstan) Beibarys Atyrau
Beibarys Atyrau (Kazakhstan)	13:3	(Slovenia) HDD Olimpija Ljubljana
HSC Csíkszereda (Romania)	0:6	(Latvia) HK Liepājas Metalurgs

=== Group C standings ===
Rank	Team	Points
1	(Latvia) HK Liepājas Metalurgs	8
2	(Kazakhstan) Beibarys Atyrau	7
3	(Romania) HSC Csíkszereda	3
4	(Slovenia) HDD Olimpija Ljubljana	0

== Third Group Stage ==
=== Group D ===
(Herning, Denmark)

Team #1	Score	Team #2
HC Asiago (Italy)	4:3 (SO)	(United Kingdom) Sheffield Steelers
Herning Blue Fox (Denmark)	1:3	(Hungary) DAB-Docler
HC Asiago (Italy)	3:2	(Hungary) DAB-Docler
Herning Blue Fox (Denmark)	3:0	(United Kingdom) Sheffield Steelers
DAB-Docler (Hungary)	6:3	(United Kingdom) Sheffield Steelers
Herning Blue Fox (Denmark)	3:2 (OT)	(Italy) HC Asiago

=== Group D standings ===
Rank	Team	Points
1	(Italy) HC Asiago	6 (+1)
2	(Hungary) DAB-Docler	6 (-1)
3	(Denmark) Herning Blue Fox	5
4	(United Kingdom) Sheffield Steelers	1

=== Group E ===
(Donetsk, Ukraine)

Team #1	Score	Team #2
Rubin Tyumen (Russia)	6:1	(Poland) KS Cracovia
HC Donbass (Ukraine)	6:2	(Latvia) HK Liepājas Metalurgs
Rubin Tyumen (Russia)	4:3	(Latvia) HK Liepājas Metalurgs
HC Donbass (Ukraine)	3:1	(Poland) KS Cracovia
KS Cracovia (Poland)	3:1	(Latvia) HK Liepājas Metalurgs
HC Donbass (Ukraine)	3:1	(Russia) Rubin Tyumen

=== Group E standings ===
Rank	Team	Points
1	(Ukraine) HC Donbass	9
2	(Russia) Rubin Tyumen	6
3	(Poland) KS Cracovia	3
4	(Latvia) HK Liepājas Metalurgs	0

== Final stage ==
=== Final Group ===
(Rouen, France)

Team #1	Score	Team #2
HC Donbass (Ukraine)	2:1	(Belarus) Yunost Minsk
Dragons de Rouen (France)	6:0	(Italy) HC Asiago
HC Donbass (Ukraine)	6:2	(Italy) HC Asiago
Dragons de Rouen (France)	2:4	(Belarus) Yunost Minsk
Yunost Minsk (Belarus)	4:1	(Italy) HC Asiago
Dragons de Rouen (France)	5:2	(Ukraine) HC Donbass

=== Final Group standings ===
Rank	Team	Points
1	(France) Dragons de Rouen	6 (+1) GF:7
2	(Belarus) Yunost Minsk	6 (+1) GF:5
3	(Ukraine) HC Donbass	6 (-2)
4	(Italy) HC Asiago	0
