= 2011–12 Professional Hockey League season =

- League: Professional Hockey League
- Sport: Ice hockey
- Number of teams: 8

Regular season
- Regular season winners: HC Sokil

Playoffs
- Finals champions: HC Donbass-2
- Runners-up: HC Sokil

UHC/PHL seasons
- ← 2010–11 2012–13 →

The 2011–12 Professional Hockey League season was the 20th annual edition of the Ukrainian Hockey Championship held in 2011–12. The season marked the first season of the Professional Hockey League and first time the national title was administered and awarded independently of the Ice Hockey Federation of Ukraine (FHU). Eight teams participated in the league, which was won by HC Donbass-2.

== Regular season ==
| | Club | GP | W | OTW | OTL | L | Goals | Pts |
|---|---|---|---|---|---|---|---|---|
| 1. | HC Sokil | 42 | 32 | 5 | 2 | 3 | 175:70 | 108 |
| 2. | HC Donbass-2 | 42 | 32 | 2 | 3 | 5 | 180:77 | 103 |
| 3. | HC Berkut | 42 | 26 | 3 | 3 | 10 | 183:106 | 87 |
| 4. | HC Kompanion-Naftogaz | 42 | 22 | 1 | 2 | 17 | 163:120 | 70 |
| 5. | HC Levy | 42 | 15 | 2 | 6 | 19 | 143:142 | 55 |
| 6. | HC Kharkivski Akuly | 42 | 10 | 8 | 2 | 22 | 141:177 | 48 |
| 7. | HSK Bilyi Bars | 42 | 6 | 1 | 3 | 32 | 84:196 | 23 |
| 8. | Vinnytski Haidamaky | 42 | 2 | 1 | 2 | 37 | 69:250 | 10 |

== Playoffs ==
Semifinals
1 | Sokil | 4
4 | Kompanion-Naftogaz | 2
2 | Donbass-2 | 4
3 | Berkut-Kyiv | 0

Final
1 | Sokil | 2
2 | Donbass-2 | 4
