= Oleg Piganovich =

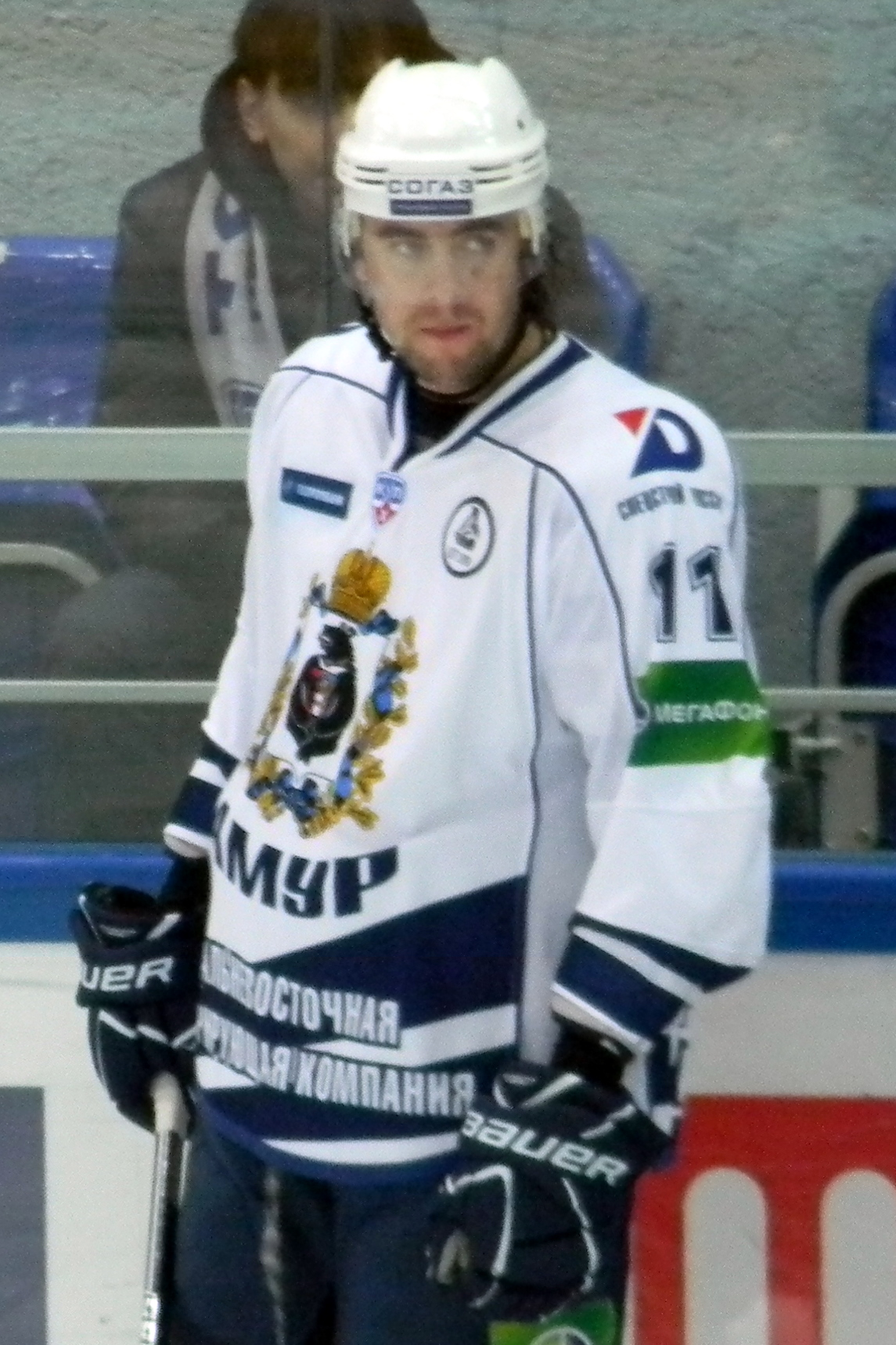
- Born: May 12, 1985 (age 40) Yaroslavl, Russian SFSR, Soviet Union
- Height: 6 ft 6 in (198 cm)
- Weight: 229 lb (104 kg; 16 st 5 lb)
- Position: Defence
- Shoots: Left
- Played for: Traktor Chelyabinsk; Spartak Moscow; Amur Khabarovsk; Avangard Omsk; HC Donbass; Torpedo Nizhny Novgorod; Neftekhimik Nizhnekamsk; Sibir Novosibirsk; Kunlun Red Star
- Playing career: 2005–present

Oleg Piganovich (born May 12, 1985) is a Russian former professional ice hockey defenseman.

== Playing career ==
Piganovich originally played with HC Dmitrov of the second tier, Russian Major League to start the 2005–06 season before he was traded to fellow league team Khimik Voskresensk.

Piganovich signed with Russian Superleague team, Traktor Chelyabinsk prior to the 2007–08 season and made his top level debut scoring 22 goals in 56 games.

After playing the 2013–14 season with HC Donbass, Piganovich was unable to fulfill his second year of his contract with the club, due to civil unrest suspending the teams involvement in the KHL. As a result, Piganovich returned to hometown club, Traktor Chelyabinsk on a one-year deal on June 30, 2014.

Piganovich after a years hiatus, returned to the KHL, playing as captain for HC Neftekhimik Nizhnekamsk in the 2017–18 season. He established new KHL career marks with 9 goals and 23 points in 53 regular season games.

On 20 July 2018, Piganovich agreed to a one-year contract as a free agent with HC Sibir Novosibirsk.

== Career statistics ==
			Regular season					Playoffs
Season	Team	League	GP	G	A	Pts	PIM	GP	G	A	Pts	PIM
2005–06	HC Dmitrov	RUS-2	10	2	1	3	12	—	—	—	—	—
2005–06	Khimik Voskresensk	RUS-2	32	4	7	11	88	5	0	0	0	12
2006–07	Khimik Voskresensk	RUS-2	29	2	10	12	46	9	0	1	1	16
2007–08	Traktor Chelyabinsk	RSL	56	22	7	29	173	3	0	0	0	2
2008–09	Traktor Chelyabinsk	KHL	47	2	18	20	117	3	0	0	0	8
2009–10	Traktor Chelyabinsk	KHL	53	4	9	13	93	4	0	0	0	14
2010–11	Spartak Moscow	KHL	51	5	13	18	82	4	1	1	2	2
2011–12	Spartak Moscow	KHL	14	2	2	4	18	—	—	—	—	—
2011–12	Amur Khabarovsk	KHL	19	2	3	5	8	4	0	0	0	4
2012–13	Amur Khabarovsk	KHL	17	1	1	2	28	—	—	—	—	—
2012–13	Avangard Omsk	KHL	23	3	4	7	10	4	0	0	0	2
2013–14	HC Donbass	KHL	52	6	14	20	62	8	1	1	2	16
2014–15	Traktor Chelyabinsk	KHL	55	3	8	11	45	6	0	0	0	4
2015–16	Torpedo Nizhny Novgorod	KHL	29	1	4	5	24	—	—	—	—	—
2015–16	HC Sarov	VHL	2	0	0	0	0	—	—	—	—	—
2017–18	Neftekhimik Nizhnekamsk	KHL	53	9	14	23	28	5	2	0	2	14
2018–19	Sibir Novosibirsk	KHL	35	1	7	8	47	—	—	—	—	—
2019–20	Sibir Novosibirsk	KHL	27	1	0	1	6	1	0	0	0	0
2020–21	Kunlun Red Star	KHL	1	0	0	0	0	—	—	—	—	—
KHL totals			476	40	97	137	568	39	4	2	6	62
