= Igor Gongalsky =

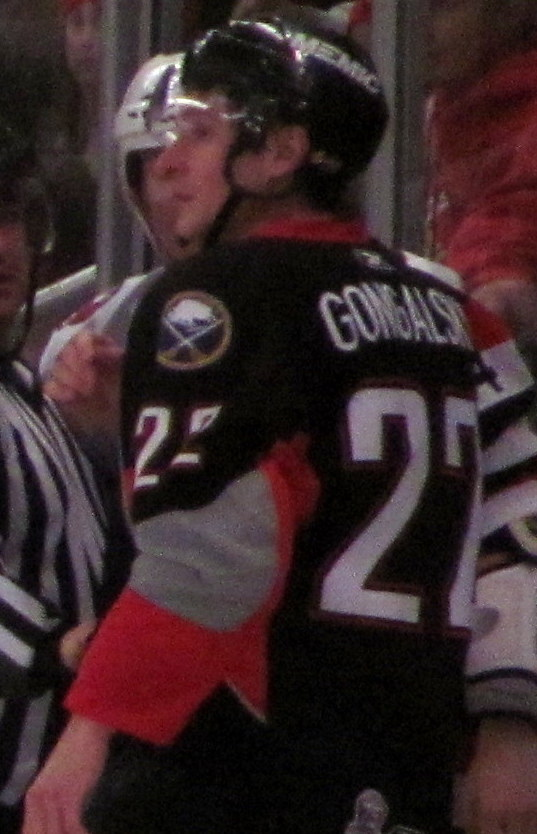
- Born: November 5, 1986 (age 39) Kiev, Ukrainian SSR, Soviet Union
- Height: 6 ft 0 in (183 cm)
- Weight: 225 lb (102 kg; 16 st 1 lb)
- Position: Left wing
- Shot: Left
- Played for: San Antonio Rampage; Portland Pirates; Rochester Americans; HC Berkut; Dundee Stars
- NHL draft: Undrafted
- Playing career: 2007–2015

Igor Gongalsky (born November 5, 1986) is a Ukrainian former professional ice hockey player who last played with the Dundee Stars of the Elite Ice Hockey League (EIHL). Igor Gongalsky is a Doctor of Chiropractic (GMG Chiropractic) in Toronto now (Canada).

== Playing career ==
Gongalsky played junior hockey in the Ontario Hockey League for the Owen Sound Attack and the Oshawa Generals. In 192 OHL games, he scored 31 goals and 40 assists for 71 points while racking up 270 penalty minutes.

After his junior career ended, Gongalsky signed with the Fresno Falcons of the ECHL for the 2007–08 season.

Gongalsky re-signed with the Falcons for the 2008–09 season and played 28 games before being released; however, he was signed by the Stockton Thunder on December 30, 2008.

During his time with the Thunder, Gongalsky earned a tryout with the San Antonio Rampage of the American Hockey League (AHL) and played 6 games before being returned to Stockton. The Thunder re-signed Gongalsky for the 2009–10 season during which he put up 31 points in 55 games.

Before the start of the 2010–11 season the Thunder traded Gongalsky to the Greenville Road Warriors for Jim McKenzie.

On November 27, 2010, Gongalsky was signed by the Portland Pirates of the AHL to a professional tryout contract and then signed an AHL standard player contract on March 4, 2011. Gongalsky was invited to the Pirates training camp the following season but was not successful in making the team and was returned to the ECHL on December 12, 2011, where his rights were held by the Gwinnett Gladiators at that time. Just 9 days later, he was signed to a professional tryout contract by the Rochester Americans of the AHL. On February 24, 2012, it was announced that the Americans had signed Gongalsky to a contract, and he played out the rest of the season with them.

For the 2012-13 season, Gongalsky returned to his home country of Ukraine by signing with HC Berkut of the Professional Hockey League of Ukraine. Gongalsky played 33 games with HC Berkut, scoring 29 points.

Gongalsky returned to North America for the 2013–14 season by signing a contract with the South Carolina Stingrays of the ECHL. He was invited to the Providence Bruins training camp on September 22, 2013 but was unsuccessful in making the team and returned to the Stingrays.

On August 15, 2014, Gongalsky left North America and moved to the United Kingdom signing a one-year contract with the Dundee Stars of the EIHL. After the season, Gongalsky announced his retirement from the professional game.

== Career statistics ==
			Regular season					Playoffs
Season	Team	League	GP	G	A	Pts	PIM	GP	G	A	Pts	PIM
2003–04	St. Michael's Buzzers	OPJHL	37	6	11	17	100	—	—	—	—	—
2004–05	Owen Sound Attack	OHL	61	7	7	14	93	7	2	1	3	4
2005–06	Owen Sound Attack	OHL	64	6	12	18	65	11	1	1	2	19
2006–07	Owen Sound Attack	OHL	11	2	0	2	22	—	—	—	—	—
2006–07	Oshawa Generals	OHL	56	16	21	37	90	—	—	—	—	—
2007–08	Fresno Falcons	ECHL	63	18	25	43	140	—	—	—	—	—
2008–09	Fresno Falcons	ECHL	28	6	6	12	54	—	—	—	—	—
2008–09	Stockton Thunder	ECHL	25	4	14	18	84	—	—	—	—	—
2008–09	San Antonio Rampage	AHL	6	0	0	0	9	—	—	—	—	—
2009–10	Stockton Thunder	ECHL	55	14	17	31	71	14	2	7	9	21
2010–11	Greenville Road Warriors	ECHL	7	2	1	3	16	—	—	—	—	—
2010–11	Portland Pirates	AHL	54	4	6	10	77	6	0	0	0	8
2011–12	Portland Pirates	AHL	13	0	0	0	29	—	—	—	—	—
2011–12	Gwinnett Gladiators	ECHL	4	1	2	3	9	—	—	—	—	—
2011–12	Rochester Americans	AHL	37	2	1	3	78	3	0	0	0	0
2012–13	HC Berkut	PHL	33	11	18	29	32	—	—	—	—	—
2013–14	South Carolina Stingrays	ECHL	44	7	16	23	63	4	0	2	2	8
2014–15	Dundee Stars	EIHL	57	14	15	29	172	—	—	—	—	—
AHL totals			110	6	7	13	193	9	0	0	0	8
