= Molodaya Gvardia =

- City: Donetsk
- League: Minor Hockey League (2013–present)
- Founded: 2013
- Home arena: Druzhba Arena (capacity: 4,130)
- Colours
- Owner: Borys Kolesnikov
- General manager: Serhiy Shakurov
- Head coach: Alexander Godynyuk
- Affiliates: HC Donbass (KHL); Bilyi Bars (PHL); Donbass-98 (junior)
- Website: gvardia.hcdonbass.com

Franchise history
- Molodaya Gvardia

Molodaya Gvardia (Russian: Молодая Гвардия; Ukrainian: Молода Гвардія, tr. Moloda Hvardiya, English: Young Guard) is a Ukrainian junior ice hockey team based in Donetsk. The team is an affiliate of the Kontinental Hockey League's HC Donbass, and is a member of the Minor Hockey League (MHL), joining in the 2013–14 season. They are the sole representative from Ukraine competing at the major-junior level. Borys Kolesnikov, a prominent Ukrainian politician and businessman, owns the organization. The team takes its name from the World War II Soviet resistance group the Young Guard, who consisted mainly of local youths and also operated in the Donbass region.

== History ==
On April 2, 2013, HC Donbass announced official negotiations had taken place regarding the inclusion of a Ukrainian minor hockey team in the KHL's Minor Hockey League system for the 2013–14 season. Ukrainian former NHL player Alexander Godynyuk was named head coach on a three-year contract. The team's name and logo were chosen by a 45% popular vote among fans, with finalist names being the 'Donetsk Scythians', and 'Donbass Flames'. On June 19, 2013, the team officially joined the MHL.
