= 2012–13 Professional Hockey League season =

- League: Professional Hockey League
- Sport: Ice hockey
- Duration: 11 September 2012 – 25 March 2013
- Teams: 7

Regular season
- Regular season winners: HC Berkut
- Top scorer: Dmytro Hnitko (Levy)

Playoffs
- Finals champions: HC Donbass-2
- Runners-up: HC Kompanion-Naftogaz

UHC/PHL seasons
- ← 2011–12 2013–14 →

The 2012–13 Professional Hockey League season was the 21st annual edition of the Ukrainian Hockey Championship, and the second season of the Professional Hockey League (PHL). Seven teams participated in season, with HC Donbass-2 becoming national champions for second year in a row.

== Regular season ==
R		GP	W	OTW	SOW	SOL	OTL	L	GF	GA	Pts
1	HC Berkut	36	25	0	5	1	0	5	148	55	86
2	HC Kompanion-Naftogaz	36	16	1	5	0	3	11	111	86	63
3	HC Dynamo Kharkiv	36	16	0	4	1	3	12	98	88	60
4	HC Donbass-2	36	15	2	2	0	4	13	110	108	57
5	Sokil Kyiv	36	14	1	2	2	4	13	85	86	54
6	HC Levy	36	10	0	4	1	2	19	97	125	41
7	Bilyi Bars	36	4	0	0	3	2	27	57	158	17

Points are awarded as follows:

- 3 Points for a win in regulation ("W")
- 2 Points for a win in overtime ("OTW") or a penalty shootout ("SOW")
- 1 Point for a loss in overtime ("OTL") or a penalty shootout ("SOL")
- 0 Points for a loss in regulation ("L")

== Group stage ==
=== Group A ===
R		GP	W	OTW	SOW	SOL	OTL	L	GF	GA	Pts
1	HC Kompanion-Naftogaz	4	2	0	1	0	0	1	11	9	8
2	Sokil Kyiv	4	2	0	0	1	0	1	10	7	7
3	HC Levy	4	1	0	0	0	0	3	6	11	3

=== Group B ===
R		GP	W	OTW	SOW	SOL	OTL	L	GF	GA	Pts
1	HC Donbass-2	4	4	0	0	0	0	0	14	5	12
2	HC Dynamo Kharkiv	4	2	0	0	0	0	2	11	11	6
3	Bilyi Bars^{[a]}	4	0	0	0	0	0	4	6	15	0

- ^{a} Berkut, the winners of the regular championship, were disqualified for not fulfilling their financial obligations to the PHL. Bilyi Bars took their place

== Playoffs ==
=== Bracket ===
Semifinals
1	HC Donbass-2	3
4	HC Dynamo Kharkiv	0
2	HC Kompanion-Naftogaz	3
3	Sokil Kyiv	2

Final
1	HC Donbass-2	4
2	HC Kompanion-Naftogaz	0
3rd place
3	Sokil Kyiv	1
4	HC Dynamo Kharkiv	0

=== Semifinals ===
- HC Dynamo Kharkiv – HC Donbass-2 0-3 (3:4 OT, 1:6, 0:3)
- HC Kompanion-Naftogaz – Sokil Kyiv 3-2 (2:0, 3:4 SO, 4:2, 2:3, 2:1 SO)

=== 3rd place ===
- Sokil Kyiv – HC Dynamo Kharkiv 3:2

=== Final ===
- HC Kompanion-Naftogaz – HC Donbass-2 0-4 (2:4, 0:3, 0:5, 2:3 SO)

== Player statistics ==
=== Top scorers ===
The following players lead the league by points at the end of the regular season

	Player	Team	G	A	Pts
1	(Ukraine) Dmytro Hnytko	HC Levy	15	23	38
2	(Ukraine) Olexander Toryanik	HC Berkut	16	20	36
3	(Ukraine) Roman Blagoy	HC Donbass-2	15	16	31
4	(Ukraine) Andriy Mikhnov	HC Berkut	12	19	31
5	(Ukraine) Igor Gongalsky	HC Berkut	11	18	29

=== Leading goaltenders ===
The following goaltenders led the league by save percentage at the end of the regular season

	Player	Team	SV%
1	(Slovakia) Jan Chovan	HC Berkut	.947
2	(Latvia) Dmitrijs Žabotinskis	HC Dynamo Kharkiv	.928
3	(Slovenia) Andrej Hočevar	Sokil Kyiv	.922
4	(Russia) Sergei Zavyalov	HC Kompanion-Naftogaz	.922
5	(Belarus) Vitaliy Trus	HC Dynamo Kharkiv	.910
