= 2012–13 IIHF Continental Cup =

Ice Hockey competition

The Continental Cup 2012–13 was the 16th edition of the IIHF Continental Cup. The season started on 28 September 2012, and finished on 13 January, 2013.

The Super Final was played in Donetsk, Ukraine on the 11–13 January 2013.

The points system used in this tournament was: the winner in regular time won 3 points, the loser 0 points; in case of a tie, an overtime and a penalty shootout is played, the winner in penalty shootouts or overtime won 2 points and the loser won 1 point.

== First Group Stage ==
=== Group A ===
(Miercurea Ciuc, Romania)

Team #1	Score	Team #2
HK Vitez (Serbia)	15:0	(Israel) Maccabi Metulla
HSC Csíkszereda (Romania)	15:0	(Turkey) Başkent Yıldızları
Başkent Yıldızları (Turkey)	6:1	(Serbia) HK Vitez
HSC Csíkszereda (Romania)	15:0	(Israel) Maccabi Metulla
Başkent Yıldızları (Turkey)	13:1	(Israel) Maccabi Metulla
HSC Csíkszereda (Romania)	6:0	(Serbia) HK Vitez

=== Group A standings ===
Rank	Team	Points
1	(Romania) HSC Csíkszereda	9
2	(Turkey) Başkent Yıldızları	6
3	(Serbia) HK Vitez	3
4	(Israel) Maccabi Metulla	0

== Second Group Stage ==
=== Group B ===
(Landshut, Germany)

Team #1	Score	Team #2
Belfast Giants (United Kingdom)	11:1	(Netherlands) Geleen Eaters
Landshut Cannibals (Germany)	2:0	(Romania) HSC Csíkszereda
Geleen Eaters (Netherlands)	3:2	(Romania) HSC Csíkszereda
Landshut Cannibals (Germany)	7:1	(United Kingdom) Belfast Giants
Belfast Giants (United Kingdom)	4:0	(Romania) HSC Csíkszereda
Landshut Cannibals (Germany)	4:2	(Netherlands) Geleen Eaters

=== Group B standings ===
Rank	Team	Points
1	(Germany) Landshut Cannibals	9
2	(United Kingdom) Belfast Giants	6
3	(Netherlands) Geleen Eaters	3
4	(Romania) HSC Csíkszereda	0

=== Group C ===
(Vaasa, Finland)

Team #1	Score	Team #2
Beibarys Atyrau (Kazakhstan)	5:3	(Latvia) HK Liepājas Metalurgs
Vaasan Sport (Finland)	11:1	(Hungary) Miskolci Jegesmedvék
HK Liepājas Metalurgs (Latvia)	7:4	(Hungary) Miskolci Jegesmedvék
Vaasan Sport (Finland)	4:5	(Kazakhstan) Beibarys Atyrau
Beibarys Atyrau (Kazakhstan)	4:0	(Hungary) Miskolci Jegesmedvék
Vaasan Sport (Finland)	4:3 (OT)	(Latvia) HK Liepājas Metalurgs

=== Group C standings ===
Rank	Team	Points
1	(Kazakhstan) Beibarys Atyrau	9
2	(Finland) Vaasan Sport	5
3	(Latvia) HK Liepājas Metalurgs	4
4	(Hungary) Miskolci Jegesmedvék	0

== Third Group Stage ==
=== Group D ===
(Bolzano, Italy)

Team #1	Score	Team #2
Toros Neftekamsk (Russia)	2:1	(Germany) Landshut Cannibals
Bolzano Foxes (Italy)	3:2	(Denmark) Herning Blue Fox
Herning Blue Fox (Denmark)	1:3	(Russia) Toros Neftekamsk
Bolzano Foxes (Italy)	2:0	(Germany) Landshut Cannibals
Herning Blue Fox (Denmark)	4:0	(Germany) Landshut Cannibals
Bolzano Foxes (Italy)	3:2 (OT)	(Russia) Toros Neftekamsk

=== Group D standings ===
Rank	Team	Points
1	(Italy) Bolzano Foxes	8
2	(Russia) Toros Neftekamsk	7
3	(Denmark) Herning Blue Fox	3
4	(Germany) Landshut Cannibals	0

=== Group E ===
(DNB Arena, Stavanger, Norway)

Team #1	Score	Team #2
Metallurg Zhlobin (Belarus)	3:0	(Kazakhstan) Beibarys Atyrau
Stavanger Oilers (Norway)	7:4	(Poland) KH Sanok
Metallurg Zhlobin (Belarus)	5:3	(Poland) KH Sanok
Stavanger Oilers (Norway)	3:2 (OT)	(Kazakhstan) Beibarys Atyrau
KH Sanok (Poland)	1:5	(Kazakhstan) Beibarys Atyrau
Stavanger Oilers (Norway)	3:4 (SO)	(Belarus) Metallurg Zhlobin

=== Group E standings ===
Rank	Team	Points
1	(Belarus) Metallurg Zhlobin	8
2	(Norway) Stavanger Oilers	6
3	(Kazakhstan) Beibarys Atyrau	4
4	(Poland) KH Sanok	0

== Final stage ==
=== Final Group ===
(Donetsk, Ukraine)

Team #1	Score	Team #2
Dragons de Rouen (France)	6:1	(Italy) Bolzano Foxes
HC Donbass (Ukraine)	1:0	(Belarus) Metallurg Zhlobin
Dragons de Rouen (France)	1:3	(Belarus) Metallurg Zhlobin
HC Donbass (Ukraine)	3:0	(Italy) Bolzano Foxes
Metallurg Zhlobin (Belarus)	1:0 (SO)	(Italy) Bolzano Foxes
HC Donbass (Ukraine)	7:1	(France) Dragons de Rouen

=== Final Group standings ===
Rank	Team	Points
1	(Ukraine) HC Donbass	9
2	(Belarus) Metallurg Zhlobin	5
3	(France) Dragons de Rouen	3
4	(Italy) Bolzano Foxes	1
