= MHC Dynamo Kharkiv =

Ukrainian ice hockey club

Dynamo Kharkiv
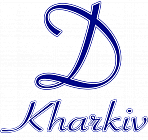
- Nickname: "kharkivyane", "kharkovchane"
- City: Kharkiv
- League: Ukrainian Hockey Championship (2018–2019)
- Founded: 1979 (2008 as Kharkivski Akuly)
- Home arena: LA Saltovsky Ice (capacity: 500)
- President: (Ukraine) Valeriy Seredenko
- Head coach: (Ukraine) Olexander Kulikov
- Website: dynamo.kharkiv.ua

Franchise history
- MHC Dynamo Kharkiv

Hockey Club Dynamo Kharkiv (Ukrainian: МХК «Динамо» Харків) is a Ukrainian ice hockey club based in Kharkiv. The team was founded in 1979 and ceased to exist in 1992. Kharkiv Sharks (founded in 2008) were a founding member of the Professional Hockey League of Ukraine, were renamed to Dynamo Kharkiv in 2012 and disbanded in 2014. In 2017 the team re-formed again as MHC Dynamo Kharkiv.

== History ==
Founded in 1979 on the base of the junior HC Dynamo Moscow team, enforced with juniors from Voskresensk, Kiev, Minsk, Ufa, Penza, and Novokuznetsk. After three seasons in the third tier of Soviet leagues, Dynamo was promoted into the second one, where it played 6 years. 1988-89 and 1989-90 seasons remained the highest achievement of Dynamo in the Soviet period. In 1992, the team was disbanded.

The Kharkivski Akuly were established in 2008 as an amateur ice hockey club, taking part in the Open Championship of Kharkiv and Kharkiv Oblast, winning the local championship itself in 2011. Following this, the team became a founding member of the Professional Hockey League of Ukraine, placing 6th in the eight-team inaugural season. Following the season, the team opted to revert to amateur play and focus on acting as a junior hockey team; acting as a farm team for HC Dynamo Kharkov.

In April 2018, club juniors Vladislav Hurko, Danylo Babchuk, Alexei Sirotenko, Dmytro Khalin played for the Ukraine men's national under-18 ice hockey team (2018 IIHF World U18 Championship Division I B). Sirotenko showed better result (1 goal and 2 assists). Babchuk has 1 goal and 1 assist, Khalin has 2 assists. Vladislav Hurko hit the top 5 goaltenders of the Division I B (4th position, 93.03 Sv%).

In 2017 the team was resurrected as MHC Dynamo Kharkiv. In the first 2017-18 season it was the 4th in the regular championship and the 3rd in play-offs.

== Players ==
=== Team captains ===
- (Ukraine) Andriy Lupandin, 2011–2012

=== Head coaches ===
- (Ukraine) Oleh Panasenko, 2011–11
- (Ukraine) Yevhen Hladchenko, 2011–2012
- (Ukraine) Dmytro Yakushyn, 2012
