= Vinnytski Haidamaky =

Ukrainian ice hockey team

- City: Vinnytsia
- League: Ukrainian Hockey Championship (2013–Present); Professional Hockey League (2011–2012)
- Founded: 2008
- Home arena: Ice Avenue (capacity: 500)
- President: (Ukraine) Valery Lukyanets

Franchise history
- Vinnytski Haidamaky

Vinnytski Haidamaky (Ukrainian: Вінницькі Гайдамаки, English: Vinnytsia Haidamaks) are a Ukrainian ice hockey club based in Vinnytsia. They were a founding member of the Professional Hockey League of Ukraine and currently compete in the nation's Ukrainian Hockey Championship. The team takes its name from the 18th-century haidamak movement, with their logo consisting of a cossack. The team's principal sponsor is the Ukrainian political party, Svoboda.

== History ==
The team was founded in the fall of 2008 as an amateur ice hockey team by V.O. Tchaikovsky and V.V. Lukianets. While competing in the city championships, the team would place 3rd in their inaugural season and 2nd the following year, while also playing in tournaments across the country, and winning the Regional Hockey League championship in 2010 and 2011. The team suspended operations for the 2012-13 PHL season, and returned in 2013-14.

== Head coaches ==
- (Ukraine) Anatoliy Stepanishchev, 2011–2012
