= HC Levy =

HC Halytski Levy
- Nickname: "Lions"
- City: Novoiavorivsk
- League: Professional Hockey League (2011–present)
- Founded: August 31, 2011
- Home arena: Novoiavorivsk Ice Palace (capacity: 600)
- Owner(s): (Ukraine) LAZ (Igor Churkin, chairman) (Ukraine) Markiyan Lubkivsky
- President: (Russia) Igor Churkin
- General manager: Mykhailo Chykantsiev
- Head coach: (Belarus) Denis Bulgakov
- Captain: (Ukraine) Dmytro Hnitko
- Affiliate: Halychyna Hockey School
- Website: HC.Lviv.ua

Franchise history
- HC Halytski Levy

Hockey club Halytski Levy (since 2017), known before 2017 as Hockey club Levy (Ukrainian: ХК Леви, English: Lions HC) is a Ukrainian Professional Hockey League club based in Novoiavorivsk, Lviv Oblast. They are a founding member of the Professional Hockey League of Ukraine.

== Seasons and records ==
=== Season-by-season results ===
Note: GP = Games played, W = Wins, OTW = Overtime wins, OTL = Overtime Losses, L = Losses, Pts = Points, GF = Goals for, GA = Goals against

Season	League	GP	W	OW	OL	L	GF	GA	Pts	Finish	Playoffs
2011-12	PHL	42	15	2	6	19	143	144	55	5th of 8	Did not qualify

== Players ==
=== Team captains ===
- (Ukraine) Dmytro Hnitko, 2011– present

=== Head coaches ===
- (Belarus) Denis Bulgakov, 2011–2012
- (Belarus) Vladislav Ershov, 2012– present
