= Bilyi Bars =

- Nickname: "Bilyi Bars"
- City: Bila Tserkva (2012 — present); Brovary (2007—2012)
- League: Ukrainian Championship / FHU (2008—2011); Professional Hockey League (2011—2013); Ukrainian Championship / FHU (2013—2016); Ukrainian Hockey League (since 2016)
- Founded: 2008
- Home arena: Ice Arena “Bilyi Bars” (capacity: 450)
- Colours
- President: (Ukraine) Kostyantyn Efymenko
- General manager: (Ukraine) Konstantin Butsenko
- Head coach: (Ukraine) Konstantin Butsenko
- Captain: (Ukraine) Ruslan Romaschenko
- Affiliates: Bilyy Bars Bila Tserkva U20; Bilyy Bars Bila Tserkva U17; Bilyy Bars Bila Tserkva U16; Bilyy Bars Bila Tserkva U15
- Website: HC-BBars.com.ua

Franchise history
- HC Bilyi Bars Bila Tserkva: HSK Bilyi Bars 2008—2012; Bars Brovary 2007—2008

Hockey Club Bilyi Bars Bila Tserkva (Ukrainian: ХК Білий Барс Біла Церква, lit. 'White Leopard of Bila Tserkva') is a Ukrainian professional ice hockey team based in Bila Tserkva, Ukraine. The club was a founding member of the Professional Hockey League of Ukraine and now playing in the Ukrainian Hockey League.

== History ==
The Bilyi Bars were founded in 2008. They began play in Brovary (Kyiv Oblast).

Twice that team won the silver of the Ukrainian Hockey Championship (2008, 2009)

In 2012, the club found a new sponsor. The team moved permanently to Bila Tserkva on October 28, 2012 from Brovary, the city where they were founded. Following this, the team changed its name from HSK Bilyi Bars (Ukrainian: ХСК Білий Барс) to HC Bilyi Bars Bila Tserkva.

The home arena was opened on December 7, 2012.

During the 2013–14 season, the club were acting as a farm team to HC Donbass, that was playing in the Kontinental Hockey League at that time.

In 2014 the club won the third silver at the Ukrainian Championship. The name of the team playing up to the last minute has been assigned to Bilyi Bars.

The hockey club actively participates in the Ukrainian hockey Movement. 25 July 2011 Bilyi Bars were at a meeting of the ice hockey teams that created The Professional Hockey League. In the 2011–12 season, Bilyi Bars took the 7th place out of eight participants.

In the 2014–15 season, the team did not participate in the Ukrainian Hockey Championship.

3 June 2016 "Bilyi Bars" co-founded Ukrainian Hockey League that reorganized the Ukrainian Hockey Championship.

Since the beginning of its activity, Bilyi Bars HC relies on young Ukrainian hockey players, and in particular on youth from Bila Tserkva. Many hockey players who defended the colors of the junior and youth national teams of Ukraine passed the school team. In particular, the champions in the second division junior championship (U18) in 2011 were three former players of the club, and in the youth championship (U20) in 2012 - two former players. Therefore, the club received the informal title of Forge of personnel, which is his main achievement.

The 2017/2018 season has so far been the best in the history of the club - it finished 2nd in the standings (repeating the result of the 2013/2014 season) and scored 84 points.

September 5, 2019 Oleksandr Bobkin (assistant head coach) Becomes Senior Coach of the Junior National Team of Ukraine (U-18).

== Present ==
=== The Bilyi Bars Juniors ===
The Bilyi Bars pays much attention to youngsters. The young hockey players graduated from the sports school of the team, who played for the national team of Ukraine (Minor league). For example, in 2011 three Bilyi Bars became champions in the second division (U18). In 2012, two Leopards became champions (U20).

The HC "Bilyi Bars" owns the affiliate junior teams: U20, U17, U16, U15. Also the hockey club takes younger children to his school.

In April 2018, club juniors Mikhail Vasilyev, Bogdan Gritsyuk, Dmytro Danylenko, Sergei Logach, Feliks Morozov played for the Ukraine men's national under-18 ice hockey team (2018 IIHF World U18 Championship Division I B). Danilenko showed better result (3 goals and 5 assists). Morozov has 4 goals and 3 assists, Logach has 1 assist, Vasiliev has 1 assist. Danilenko has taken 2nd position, Morozov has taken 4th position in the overall rating of Division I B. Logach and Vasiliev took the 13th position in the ranking of defencemans.

Now Bilyi Bars recruit children in a sports school that were born in 2002—2003, 2005—2006, 2007—2008 and 2009—2011. Children's teams from Bila Tserkva go to the Ukrainian championships and specialized tournaments.

In the 2018/2019 season, the Bilyi Bars youth team became the junior champion of Ukraine.

=== Coaching staff ===
==== Konstantin Butsenko ====
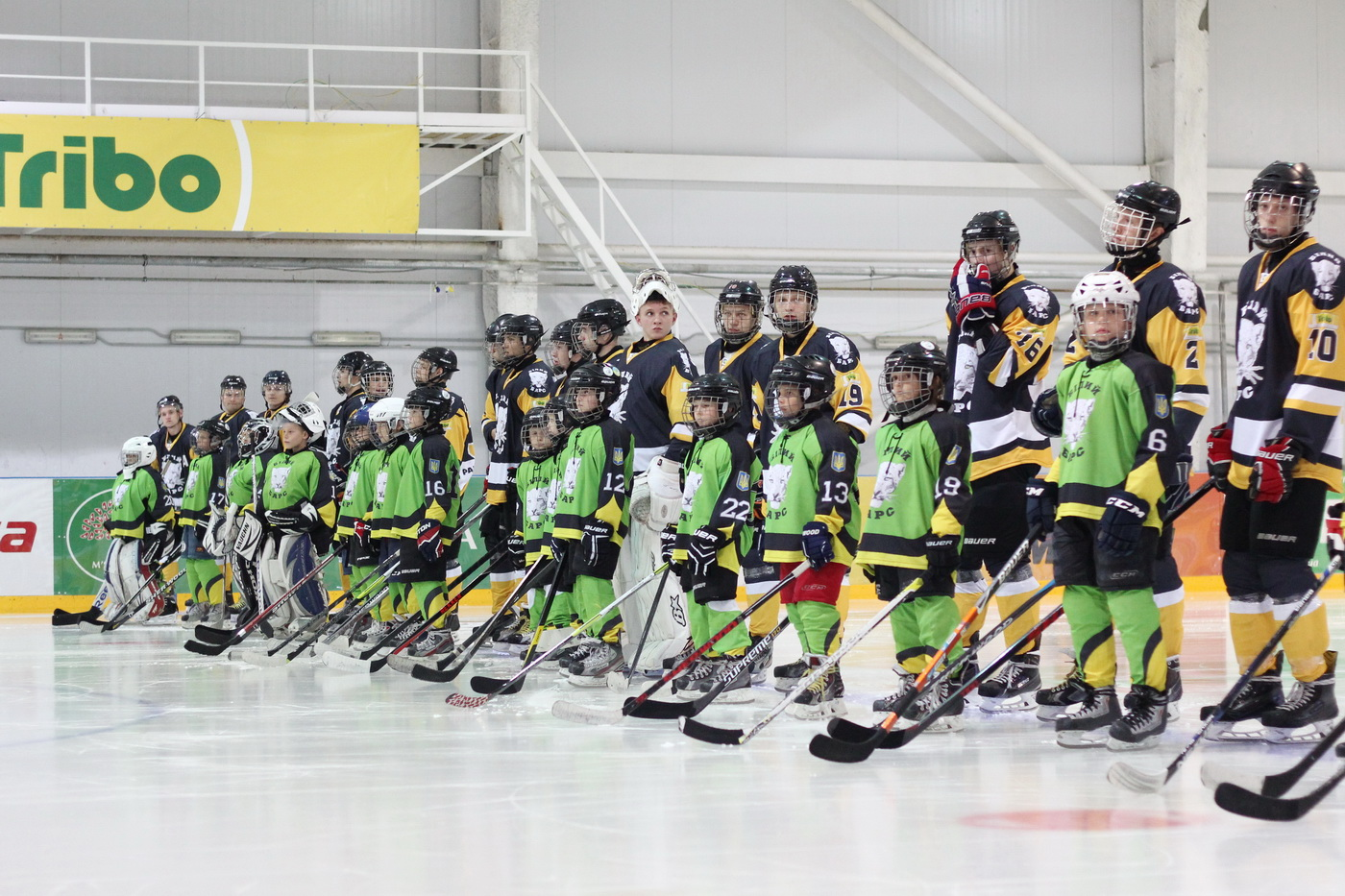
Juniors of the HC "Bilyi Bars" (September 2016)

Mr. Butsenko is the sport master of the international class. It is permanent head coach of team (except for 2013–14 season). He played for Dynamo Kharkov, Sokil Kyiv, Avangard Omsk, Spartak Moscow, Neftekhimik Nizhnekamsk, SKA Saint Petersburg etc.

He played in the Ukrainian national team in 1993, 1994, 1998, 1999. At the world championships he got the result: 23 games played, 14 goals, 20 assists.

==== Olexandr Bobkin ====
Olexander Bobkin is assistant coach since 2015. He is the sport master of the international class, ex player of the Ukrainian national team. Mr. Bobkin played for Lokomotiv Yaroslavl, Berkut-Kyiv, Neftekhimik Nizhnekamsk, Sibir Novosibirsk, Neftyanik Almetyevsk, Sokil Kyiv, Donbass, ATEK etc.

He played in the Ukrainian national team: 29 games played, 9 goals, 12 assists. Mr. Bobkin is champion of Ukraine (2006, 2007, 2008, 2011, 2015).

On September 5, 2019 he became the senior coach of the U-18 junior team of Ukraine.

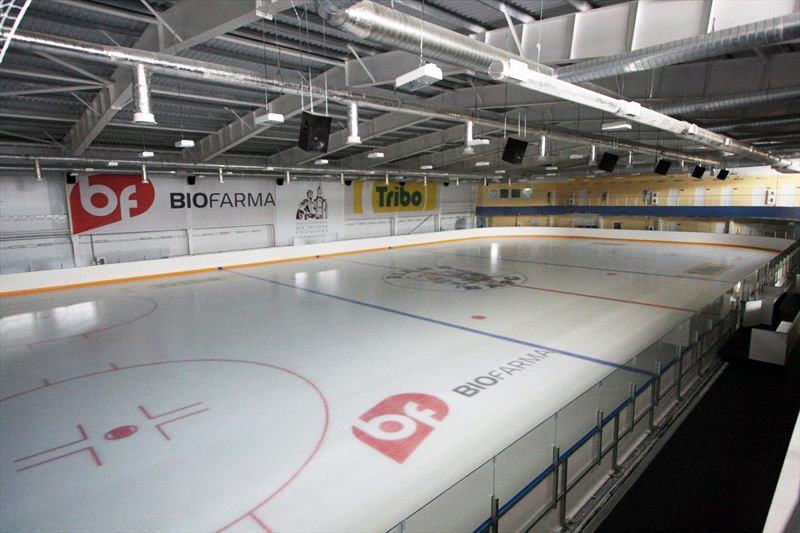
Ice Arena “Bilyi Bars”

==== Vitaliy Litvinenko ====
Vitali Litvinenkoy is assistant coach since 2017. He is played for Dynamo Kharkov, Sokil Kyiv, Bilyi Bars, Lokomotiv Yaroslavl, Lada Togliatti, Torpedo Nizhny Novgorod, Gomel etc.

Mr. Litvinenko played in the Ukrainian national team: 154 games played, 43 goals, 61 assists. He played at the 2002 Winter Olympics etc.

== Ice hockey statistics ==
Note: GP = Games played, W = Wins, OTW = Overtime wins, OTL = Overtime Losses, L = Losses, GF = Goals for, GA = Goals against, Pts = Points

Season	Team	League	GP	W	OTW	OTL	L	GF	GA	Pts	Finish	Playoffs
2008–2009	"Bilyi Bars" (Brovary)	FHU	29	16	2	2	9	163	117	54	2nd of 5	Final loss
2009–2010	"Bilyi Bars" (Brovary)	FHU	20	11	1	1	7	97	73	36	4th of 6	Bronze game loss
2010–2011	"Bilyi Bars" (Brovary)	FHU	24	6	1	0	17	65	137	20	5th of 7	Quarterfinal loss
2011–2012	"Bilyi Bars" (Brovary)	PHL	42	6	1	3	32	84	196	23	7th of 8	Did not make playoffs
2012–2013	"Bilyi Bars" (Bila Tserkva)	PHL	36	4	0	5	27	57	158	17	7th of 7	Did not make playoffs
2013–2014	"Bilyi Bars" (Bila Tserkva)	FHU	24	13	6	0	5	116	42	51	2nd of 5	Final loss
2015–2016	"Bilyi Bars" (Bila Tserkva)	FHU	42	19	0	1	22	150	214	58	5th of 8	Did not make playoffs
2016–2017	"Bilyi Bars" (Bila Tserkva)	UHL	40	8	2	1	29	96	192	29	5th of 6	Did not make playoffs
2017–2018	"Bilyi Bars" (Bila Tserkva)	UHL	40	27	0	3	10	199	105	84	2nd of 6	Semifinal loss
2018-2019	"Bilyi Bars" (Bila Tserkva)	UHL	40	13	1	1	25	100	164	42	4-е з 6	Semifinal loss

== The current team roster ==
Updated March 5, 2018

Goaltenders
#	Nation	Player	Catches	Birthday	Birthplace
1	(Ukraine)	Alexei Loginov	left	25 November 1999	Kyiv, Ukraine
20	(Ukraine)	Alexander Kachula	left	10 July 2000	Kharkiv, Ukraine
30	(Ukraine)	Sergey Liulchuk	left	30 March 1994	Kyiv, Ukraine

Defenceman
#	Nation	Player	Catches	Birthday	Birthplace
2	(Ukraine)	Mikhail Vasilyev	left	21 November 2000
3	(Ukraine)	Daniil Gritsenko	left	19 June 1999	Kyiv, Ukraine
5	(Ukraine)	Sergei Logach	left	22 June 2000	Kyiv Ukraine
11	(Ukraine)	Maxim Yadlovski	right	10 November 1996	Zolochiv, Ukraine
17	(Ukraine)	Vladislav Gertsik	right	19 June 2000	Brovary, Ukraine
23	(Ukraine)	Nikita Tabashnik	left	18 February 2000	Kharkiv, Ukraine
24	(Ukraine)	Bogdan Gritsyuk	right	1 March 2000	Vinnytsia, Ukraine
26	(Ukraine)	Alexander Voronin	left	22 October 1999	Donetsk, Ukraine
28	(Ukraine)	Bogdan Savchenko	right	18 July 2000

Forward
#	Nation	Player	Catches	Birthday	Birthplace
4	(Ukraine)	Maxim Romakhin	left	28 September 2000	Kyiv, Ukraine
9	(Ukraine)	Nikita Lesnikov	left	6 October 1999	Brovary, Ukraine
10	(Ukraine)	Alexander Naydyonov	left	26 October 1999	Brovary, Ukraine
13	(Ukraine)	Danil Vedmedev	left	14 May 2001
14	(Ukraine)	Artyom Kozienko	right	6 November 1998	Kyiv, Ukraine
16	(Ukraine)	Danil Netesa	left	17 August 2001
19	(Ukraine)	Rinat Durdyiev	right	30 June 2000
21	(Ukraine)	Ivan Panov	right	6 February 2000	Donetsk, Ukraine
22	(Ukraine)	Oleg Gumenyuk	left	25 December 2000
25	(Ukraine)	Daniil Pecherskikh	left	25 October 1999	Donetsk, Ukraine
29	(Ukraine)	Maxim Razumov	left	2 June 1999	Brovary, Ukraine

Centre
#	Nation	Player	Catches	Birthday	Birthplace
7	(Ukraine)	Dmytro Danylenko	left	10 April 2000	Kyiv, Ukraine
8	(Ukraine)	Vladislav Kutsevich	left	8 April 1994	Kyiv, Ukraine
15	(Ukraine)	Ruslan Romaschenko (team captain)	left	2 February 1993	Kharkiv, Ukraine

Right wing
#	Nation	Player	Catches	Birthday	Birthplace
18	(Ukraine)	Kirill Bondarenko	right	15 February 1996	Kyiv, Ukraine
27	(Ukraine)	Feliks Morozov	left	7 March 2000	Kharkiv, Ukraine

Left wing
#	Nation	Player	Catches	Birthday	Birthplace
12	(Ukraine)	Yevgeni Timchenko	left	24 May 1996	Kyiv, Ukraine

== Honors ==
=== Champions ===
- IHFU Federation Cup: (1) 2008

=== Awards ===
- (bronze) (2018) — the play off of the UHL.
