= Professional Hockey League =

Ukrainian former hockey league

- "Professional Hockey League of Ukraine"
- Formerly: Ukrainian Major League
- Sport: Ice hockey
- Founded: 25 July 2011, in Kyiv, Ukraine
- First season: 2011–12
- Folded: 2013
- CEO: Vadym Sysiuk
- Director: Dmitri Khristich
- No. of teams: 7
- Country: Ukraine
- Continent: Europe
- Last champion: Donbass-2 (2nd title)
- Broadcasters: XSPORT (Ukraine); Pershyi Natsionalnyi (Ukraine)
- Website: PHL-UA.com.ua

The Professional Hockey League (PHL) (Ukrainian: Професіональна хокейна ліга (ПХЛ), romanized: Profesionalna khokeina liha) was an ice hockey league in Ukraine, founded in 2011 and folded in 2013. The country's national title, the Ukrainian Championship, was awarded annually to the league champion following a 4-team, 2-round playoff at the end of the 41-game regular season. Runners-up received silver and bronze medals. This format ended after the 2012–13 season, whereupon the FHU reclaimed administration of the title. The winner of the Ukrainian/PHL Championship was also guaranteed qualification into the Champions Hockey League season. The PHL is shown on the First National TV channel and the Hockey channel to broadcast regular season and playoff games. Many of the PHL's games are also broadcast online.

The league was formed on 25 July 2011, in Kyiv, Ukraine, to reflect its fully professional status, apart from its predecessor organisation, the Major League (Ukrainian: Вища ліга, Vyscha Liha), which was controlled and operated by the Ice Hockey Federation of Ukraine (FHU) as part of the Ukrainian Hockey Championship, inaugurated in 1992. In obtaining the rights to the Championship, the FHU maintains a supervisory role, and reserves the right to intervene in league matters.

Naturally, Ukrainians constitute a large majority of the players in the PHL. Expatriates account for 25% of the league's players, most of which come from Russia and Belarus, but also Lithuania, Latvia, the Czech Republic, Slovakia and the United States.

== Seasons ==
- 2011–12 (winner: HC Donbass-2)
- 2012–13 (winner: HC Donbass-2)

== History ==
Original league logo used in 2011–12

Following the collapse of the Soviet Union, subsequent dissolution of the Soviet Championship League, and Ukrainian independence, the Ice Hockey Federation of Ukraine established the country's first national league, the Ukrainian Hockey Championship, in 1992. The league was known as the Major League (Ukrainian: Вища ліга, Vyscha Liha) until 2009–10, when it reverted to its original role as a division of the Ukrainian Championship. Following the 2010–11 season, the league dissolved. The top division, Division A (also known as the Central Division), became the PHL; Division B (the Western Division) became the Western Ukrainian Amateur Hockey League.

Following the 2012–13 season, and financial turmoil, the FHU retook control of awarding the Ukrainian Hockey Championship.

=== Uniforms ===
League uniforms consist of a jersey, short pants, socks, gloves, and a helmet. Most PHL jerseys display the team's primary logo in the centre of the chest, while some also display secondary logos on the shoulders. Each player in a team's line-up for a game must have a different number displayed on the back of their jersey, as well as the player's surname above their number on the back of their jersey, which according to league regulations must be written in the Ukrainian language. Bilyi Bars and Kompanion-Naftogaz drew criticism during the 2011–12 season for violating this rule and using the Russian language instead. While not required, teams typically place their numbers on each upper arm as well. Team captains and alternate captains wear the letters "C" or "K" (Ukrainian: Капіта́н), and "A" respectively on the front of their jerseys.

== Teams ==
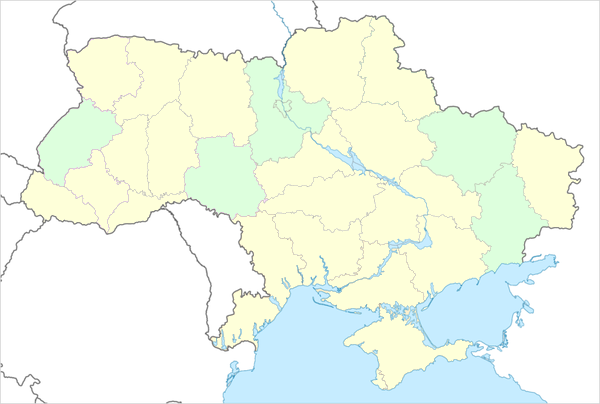

The PHL was founded with 8 professional teams from across Ukraine. Prior to its inaugural season, the league was initially slated to ice 9 teams, while considering 11 applicants, and aspires to increase to 12 teams in the future. The league has stated intent to expand to Sumy, Dnipropetrovsk, Luhansk, Kherson, Kalush, Severodonetsk, Ivano-Frankivsk, Kryvyi Rih, and Zakarpattia. Of the league's original 8 teams, 4 were based within the Kyiv region. Sokil Kyiv is the only team in the PHL to have iced a team in every prior Ukrainian league season since its beginnings in 1992. Five of the league's original 8 teams competed in the final Major League season.

Following the inaugural season, the league contracted to 7 teams, as Vinnytski Haidamaky lacked the funding and proper infrastructure to continue. Kharkiv's team, Akuly, withdrew as well to make way for Dynamo Kharkiv. Bilyi Bars relocated from Brovary to Bila Tserkva, another city still within Kyiv Oblast.

Later, during the 2012–13 season, HC Berkut was expelled from the league, Dynamo Kharkiv folded, and HC Donbass-2 dissolved following their championship at seasons-end.

The league has been in discussions to create a junior affiliate league. In 2013–14, it was planned that a new team, Patriot Vinnytsia, will join the league, along with a team playing jointly in Ivano-Frankivsk & Kalush. The league has held negotiations to include a team from Dniprodzerzhynsk, and expected immediate expansion to include Sevastopol, Simferopol, Kremenchuk, Druzhkivka, and Luhansk; the latter two of which will have new arenas constructed.

=== Names ===
PHL team names reflect the general culture of European ice hockey naming conventions. Club names may reflect historical, geographical, cultural, or political affiliations – or simply be the brand name of a club's primary sponsor. Because of the prevalence of the Russian language in Ukraine, some teams present their club name and logo solely in the Russian language (specifically, Donbass and Kharkovskiye Akuly).

A club's name is usually composed of the prefix "Hockey Club" to describe the team's organizational status and its associated sport. The suffix is generally a proper name or mascot in either the singular or plural form ("White Leopard" or "Lions"), a geographical indicator (Donbas), or team sponsor ("Companion", "Naftogaz"). Team names have also taken on the North American form of following the city name with a mascot ("Kharkiv Sharks")

In both Ukrainian and Russian leagues, misconceptions about the official name of a club are often present following English translation, whereby the "HC" prefix is dropped and the city name is added as a suffix (i.e. HC Sokil is often written as Sokil Kyiv).

=== List of teams ===
| Division | Team | City/Area | Arena | Capacity | Founded | Joined | Team Captain |
|---|---|---|---|---|---|---|---|
| Professional League | Sokil | Kyiv | Kyiv Sports Palace | 7,200 | 1963 | 2011 | |
| Professional League | Berkut | Kyiv / Brovary | Ice Palace TEC Terminal | 1,500 | 2004 | 2011 | Serhiy Klymentiev |
| Professional League | Kompanion-Naftogaz | Kyiv | SK ATEK | 600 | 2006 | 2011 | |
| Professional League | Bilyi Bars | Bila Tserkva | Ice Arena TEC Terminal | 1500 | 2007 | 2011 | Vitaliy Lytvynenko |
| Professional League | Levy | Novoyavorivsk | Novoyavorivsk Ice Palace | 600 | 2011 | | Dmytro Hnitko |

== Ukrainian Championship ==
Ukrainian Championship
- Founded: 1992
- Region: Ukraine
- Current champions: Donbas-2 (2)
- Most championships: Sokil Kyiv (12)
- Website: www.fhu.com.ua

The Ukrainian Hockey Championship is an annual ice hockey award and national title, bestowed to the ice hockey organisation judged to have the best performing team in Ukraine, founded in 1992. Prior to the formation of the PHL, the Ice Hockey Federation of Ukraine (FHU) administered and handed out the award, allowing both amateur and professional teams to compete in an annual regular season, then playoff for the title. On 25 July 2011, the FHU transferred the rights of the event to the PHL. The championship is currently awarded in the PHL following a 4-team playoff at the end of the 41-game regular season. The playoffs are decided in a best-of-seven series. Teams that miss the finals will enter into a best-of-five format playoff to determine final positioning. In addition to the title, winning team is given a cash prize by the league, $1,000,000 USD, shared by all of the players. National finalists receive silver and bronze medals. The winner of the Ukrainian Championship is also guaranteed qualification into the IIHF Continental Cup season.

== See also ==
- Ukrainian Hockey Championship
- Ice Hockey Federation of Ukraine
- 2012 Professional Hockey League All-Star Game
