= Ukrainian Hockey Championship =

National championship of Ukrainian professional ice hockey

Ukrainian Championship
- Current season, competition or edition: 2025–26 Ukrainian Hockey Championship
- UHC emblem, 2009–12
- Sport: Ice Hockey
- Founded: 1992
- No. of teams: 6
- Country: Ukraine
- Most titles: Sokil Kyiv (15)
- Current shield: 2024-2025: HC Kremenchuk
- Website: FHU.com.ua

The Ukrainian Hockey Championship (Ukrainian: Чемпіонат України з хокею, romanized: Chempionat Ukrayiny z khokeiu) is an annual ice hockey award and national title, bestowed to the ice hockey organization judged to have the best performing team in Ukraine, founded in 1992. Prior to the 2015–16 season, the league playing for the title took the name Ukrainian Hockey Extra League. In 2016, the new Ukrainian Hockey League was created instead, which folded in 2021, after which the Ukrainian Hockey Championship was re-instated.

== History ==
First ice hockey teams in the territory of modern Ukraine emerged during the 1920s in Lviv and Chernivtsi. After 1946 ice hockey spread to central and eastern regions, and many players from Ukrainian teams were incorporated into the Soviet Union team. First Ukrainian hockey competitions were conducted in February 1949.

Prior to the formation of the Professional Hockey League (PHL), the Ice Hockey Federation of Ukraine (FHU) administered and handed out the award, allowing both amateur and professional teams to compete in an annual regular season, then playoff for the title. On July 25, 2011, the FHU transferred the rights of the event to the PHL.

In 2011–12, the championship was awarded in the PHL following a 4-team playoff at the end of the 41-game regular season. The finals were determined though a best-of-seven playoff. Teams that miss the finals participate in a best-of-five playoff to determine final positioning. In addition to the title, the winning team was given a cash prize by the league, US$1,000,000, shared by all of the players. National finalists receive silver and bronze medals.

== Teams ==
Location of teams in 2020–21 Ukrainian Hockey League

== Teams in 2024-25 ==
Team	Home city	Founded	Arena	Capacity
Dnipro Kherson	Kherson	1999	Favorit Arena	400
HC Kremenchuk	Kremenchuk	2010	Aisberg Arena	900
HC Kryzhynka Kyiv	Kyiv	1994	Kryzhynka Ice Stadium	500
HC Storm Odesa	Odesa	2024	Palace of Sports, Odesa	5000
Kyiv Capitals	Kyiv	2023	Palace of Sports, Kyiv	7000
Sokil Kyiv	Kyiv	1963 (reestablished in 2020)	Palace of Sports, Kyiv	7000

=== Former teams ===
- ATEK Kyiv
- Berkut
- Berkut-Kyiv
- Dniprovski Vovky Dnipro
- Dnipro Kherson
- Donbass-2
- Druzhba-78
- Ekspres Lviv
- Generals Kyiv
- Halytsky Levy
- Jupiter
- Kharkiv
- Kharkivski Akuly
- Kryvbas
- Kryzynka Kyiv
- Kryzhynka-Kompanion
- Legion Simferopol
- Lutsk
- NORD
- Odesa
- Olimpiya Kalush
- OUFK Kharkiv
- Patriot Vinnytsia
- Politekhnik Kyiv
- Rapid
- Salamandra Kharkiv
- SDYuShOR Sokil-89 Kyiv
- SDYuShOR Sokil-90 Kyiv
- SDYuSShOR-Misto Kharkiv
- ShVSM Kyiv
- Sokil Kyiv
- Vatra Ivano-Frankivsk
- VIM-Berkut
- Vinnytski Haidamaky
- Vityaz Kharkiv
- Vorony Sumy
- Yavir Yavoriv
- Yunist Kharkiv

== Winners by season ==
- 1992–93: Sokil Kyiv
- 1993–94: ShVSM Kyiv
- 1994–95: Sokil Kyiv
- 1995–96: not contested
- 1996–97: Sokil Kyiv
- 1997–98: Sokil Kyiv
- 1998–99: Sokil Kyiv
- 1999–2000: HC Berkut-Kyiv
- 2000–01: HC Berkut-Kyiv
- 2001–02: HC Berkut-Kyiv
- 2002–03: Sokil Kyiv
- 2003–04: Sokil Kyiv
- 2004–05: Sokil Kyiv
- 2005–06: Sokil Kyiv
- 2006–07: ATEK Kyiv
- 2007–08: Sokil Kyiv
- 2008–09: Sokil Kyiv
- 2009–10: Sokil Kyiv
- 2010–11: HC Donbass
- 2011–12: HC Donbass-2
- 2012–13: HC Donbass-2
- 2013–14: HC Kompanion-Naftogaz
- 2014–15: ATEK Kyiv
- 2015–16: HC Donbass
- 2016–17: HC Donbass
- 2017–18: HC Donbass
- 2018–19: HC Donbass
- 2019–20: HC Kremenchuk
- 2020–21: HC Donbass
- 2021–22: no winner
- 2022–23: Sokil Kyiv
- 2023–24: Sokil Kyiv
- 2024–25: HC Kremenchuk
- 2025–26: Sokil Kyiv

=== Statistics by club ===
Club	Winners	Winning years
Sokil Kyiv	15	1993, 1995, 1997, 1998, 1999, 2003, 2004, 2005, 2006, 2008, 2009, 2010, 2023, 2024, 2026
HC Donbass / HC Donbass-2	8	2011, 2012, 2013, 2016, 2017, 2018, 2019, 2021
Berkut-Kyiv	3	2000, 2001, 2002
HC Kremenchuk	2	2020, 2025
ATEK Kyiv	2	2007, 2015
HC Kompanion-Naftogaz	1	2014
ShVSM Kyiv	1	1994

=== Winners by season (Soviet period) ===
Soviet emblem

- 1941: Spartak Lviv
- 1948: DO Kyiv
- 1949: Locomotive Kharkiv
- 1950: Locomotive Kharkiv
- 1951: Locomotive Kharkiv
- 1952: Locomotive Kharkiv
- 1953: Dynamo Kyiv
- 1954: Zenit Kyiv
- 1955: ODO Kyiv
- 1956: ODO Kyiv
- 1957: no championship due to weather
- 1958: Torpedo-KhTZ Kharkiv
- 1959: Dynamo Kyiv
- 1960: Krasny Excavator Kyiv
- 1961: Avangard Kyiv
- 1962: Avangard Kyiv
- 1963: ?
- 1964: Avangard Kyiv
- 1965: Dynamo Kyiv
- 1966: Krasny Excavator Kyiv
- 1967: Krasny Excavator Kyiv
- 1968: Dynamo Kyiv
- 1969: Dnipropetrovsk Oblast
- 1970: Krasny Excavator Kyiv
- 1971: Dynamo Kyiv
- 1972: Krasny Excavator Kyiv
- 1973: Krasny Excavator Kyiv
- 1974: Krasny Excavator Kyiv
- 1975: Krasny Excavator Kyiv
- 1976: Krasny Excavator Kyiv
- 1977: ?
- 1978: Krasny Excavator Kyiv
- 1979: ?
- 1980: ?
- 1981: Kyiv City
- 1982: ?
- 1983: ?
- 1984: ?
- 1985: ?
- 1986: ?
- 1987: ?
- 1988: ?
- 1989: ?
- 1990: ?
- 1991: ?

== Awards ==
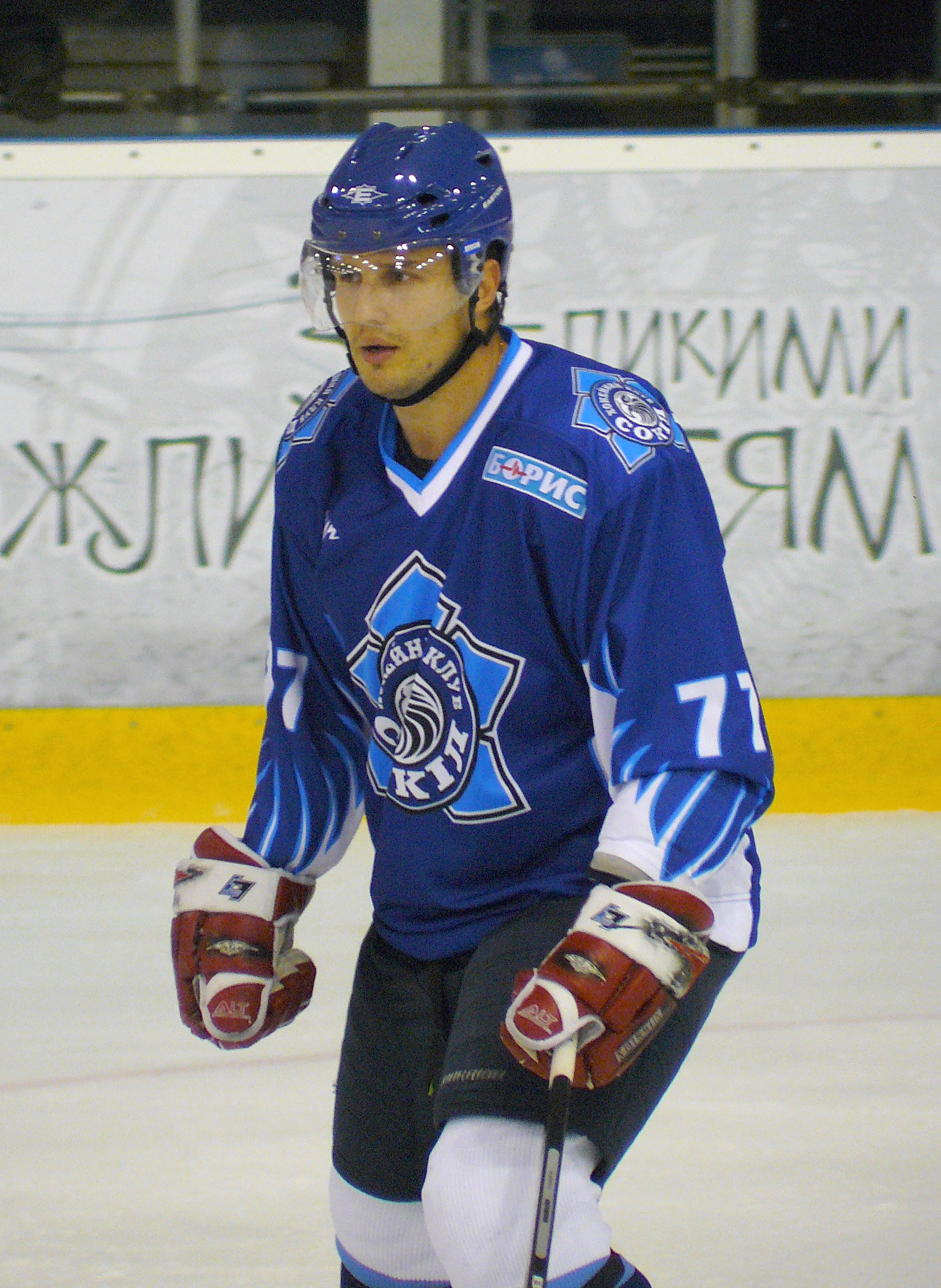
Kostiantyn Kasianchuk

=== Ukraine Player of the Year ===
- 2002: Vasyl Bobrovnikov
- 2003: Borys Protsenko
- 2004: Ruslan Fedotenko
- 2005: Kostiantyn Simchuk
- 2006: Serhiy Klymentiev
- 2007: Vyacheslav Zavalnyuk
- 2009: Ruslan Fedotenko
- 2010: Kostiantyn Kasianchuk
- 2011: Oleksandr Materukhin
- 2012: Ruslan Fedotenko
- 2013: Kostiantyn Kasianchuk

== See also ==
- Professional Hockey League
- Ice Hockey Federation of Ukraine
- 2012 Professional Hockey League All-Star Game
