= List of HC Donbass seasons =

HC Donbass is a professional ice hockey team based in Donetsk, a city in the Donets Basin region of Ukraine. The only Ukrainian club playing outside of the Professional Hockey League (PHL), Donbass plays in Kontinental Hockey League (KHL). Borys Kolesnikov, a prominent Ukrainian politician and businessman, purchased the team in 2010, and since this time the organization has become the most successful in Ukraine.

Donbass played home games at Leader Arena from 2006 to 2010. In 2011, the team permanently moved to the Druzhba Palace of Sports after its renovations were complete.

The club was founded in 2005 as Hockey Club Donetsk-Kolbyko and took part in the XIV Ukrainian Championship by competing in the First League. After 3 years of competing only in tournament play, the club returned to the Ukrainian Hockey Championship. In its 4 seasons of national competition beginning in 2008, the franchise won its first title in 2011, before joining the VHL. It was at this time that the organization founded a subsidiary club, Donbass-2, to compete in the Ukrainian Championship in its place. Donbass-2 won its first title in 2012 during the inaugural PHL season.

== Season by season ==
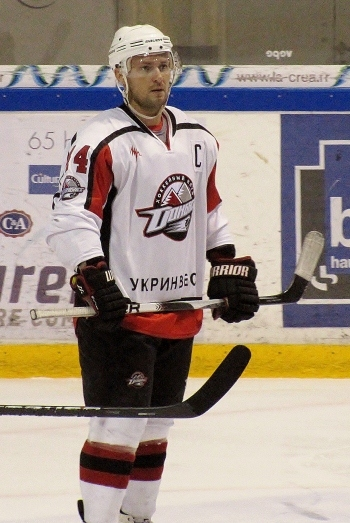
Serhiy Varlamov, captain of Donbass, played on the 2011 Ukrainian Championship winning roster, and was named to the 2012 All-Ukrainian All Star Team

=== Ukrainian Championship (2006-2011) ===
Ukrainian Champion	League leader	Division Leader

Season	League	Division	Regular season^{[a]}											Postseason						Awards
Season	League	Division	Div. Finish	League; Finish	GP	W	OTW	T	OTL	L	Pts	GF	GA	GP	W	L	GF	GA	Result	Awards
2005–06	First	B	1st	2nd	2	2	0	0	0	0	6	20	3	1	1	0	2	1	Won First League, 1–0 (SDYUSSHOR Kharkiv)	—
2005–06	Major	–												2	0	2	5	7	Lost promotion series, 0–2 (ATEK)	—
2006–07	First	First League season cancelled												XV Ukrainian Championship playoff not held						
2007–08	First	First League season cancelled																		
2008–09	Major	Eastern	1st	6th	19	14	0	–	0	5	6	134	66	6	4	2	21^{[b]}	13^{[b]}	Won first qualifying round, 2–0 (Vorony Sumy); Won second qualifying round, 2–0 (Ekspres Lviv)^{[b]} Lost quarterfinal, 0–2 (HC Kharkiv)	—
2009–10	Major	A	5th	–	20	5	0	–	1	14	16	52	100	5	2	3	9	15	Won qualifying round, 2–1 (Vatra Ivano-Frankivsk)^{[c]} Lost quarterfinals, 0–2 (Bilyi Bars)	—
2010–11	Major	–		1st	24	22	1	–	0	1	68	179	32	4	4	0	20	7	Bye for quarterfinals Won semifinals, 2-0 (HC Kharkiv); Won Championship, 2–0 (Sokil Kyiv)	—
First League totals					2	2	0	0	0	0	6	20	3	1	1	0	2	1	1 Playoff Appearance	
Major League totals					63	41	1	–	1	20	90	365	198	17	10	7	55	42	4 Playoff Appearances	

=== Russian Major League (2011–12) ===
Conference Leader

Season	League	Conference	Regular season^{[a]}												Postseason						Awards^{[d]}
Season	League	Conference	Conf. Finish	League; Finish	GP	W	OTW	SOW	OTL	SOL	L	Pts	GF	GA	GP	W	L	GF	GA	Result	Awards^{[d]}
2011–12	VHL	Western	1st	3rd	53	31	3	4	2	2	11	111	179	112	3	3	0	29	17	Won conference quarterfinals, 3–0 (Titan Klin); Won conference semifinals, 3–0 (Neftyanik Almetyevsk); Lost league semi-finals, 0–4 (Toros Neftekamsk)	Oleksandr Materukhin (FHU-POY, FHU-AST); Oleksandr Pobedonotsev (FHU-AST); Serhiy Varlamov (FHU-AST)
VHL totals					53	31	3	4	2	2	11	111	179	112	3	3	0	29	17	1 Playoff Appearance	

== Tournaments ==
Note: GP = Games played, W = Wins, OTW = Overtime wins, OTL = Overtime Losses, L = Losses, Pts = Points, GF = Goals for, GA = Goals against

Won Tournament	Tournament Leader	Group Leader

=== Cup of Ukraine ===
Year	GP	W	OTW	T	OTL	L	GF	GA	Pts	Finish	Finals
2007	2	0	0	0	0	5	28	0	0	3rd, Group A	Did not qualify

=== Westa-Neftek International Cup ===
Year	GP	W	T	L	GF	GA	Pts	Finish	Finals
2007	3	3	0	0	38	7	6	1st, Group B	Won finals, 5:3 (Dnipro-Meteor Dnipropetrovsk)

=== Dnipro Cup ===
Year	GP	W	T	L	GF	GA	Pts	Finish	Finals
2008	3	2	0	1	35	11	6	2nd, Group B	Lost 3rd place match, 6:4 (Piraty Dnipropetrovsk)

=== Federation Cup ===
Year	GP	W	OTW	OTL	L	GF	GA	Pts	Finish
2010	3	1	0	1	1	9	11	4	3rd

=== Donbass Open Cup ===
Year	GP	W	OTW	T	OTL	L	GF	GA	Pts	Finish
2011	3	0	0	0	0	3	4	10	0	4th
2012	4	2	0	0	1	1	8	9	7	3rd

=== IIHF Continental Cup ===
Year	GP	W	OTW	OTL	L	GF	GA	Pts	Finish	Awards
2011–12	3	3	0	0	0	12	4	9	1st, Group E	Vladimir Malevich (D)
2011–12	3	2	0	0	1	10	8	6	3rd, Super Final	Vladimir Malevich (D)
2012–13	3	3	0	0	11	1	9	4	1st, Super Final	Ján Laco (G); Clay Wilson (D)

== Notes ==
- ^{a} GP = Games played, W = Wins, OTW = Overtime wins, T = Tie, OTL = Overtime Losses, L = Losses, Pts = Points, GF = Goals for, GA = Goals against
- ^{b} Ekspres Lviv withdrew from the tournament and did not play due to a loss of sponsorship, forfeiting both matches.
- ^{c} Vatra Ivano-Frankivst withdrew from the tournament, forfeiting game 3.
- ^{d} FHU-AST = FHU All Star Team, FHU-POY = FHU Player of the Year
