= Dmytro Tolkunov =

Ukrainian ice hockey player

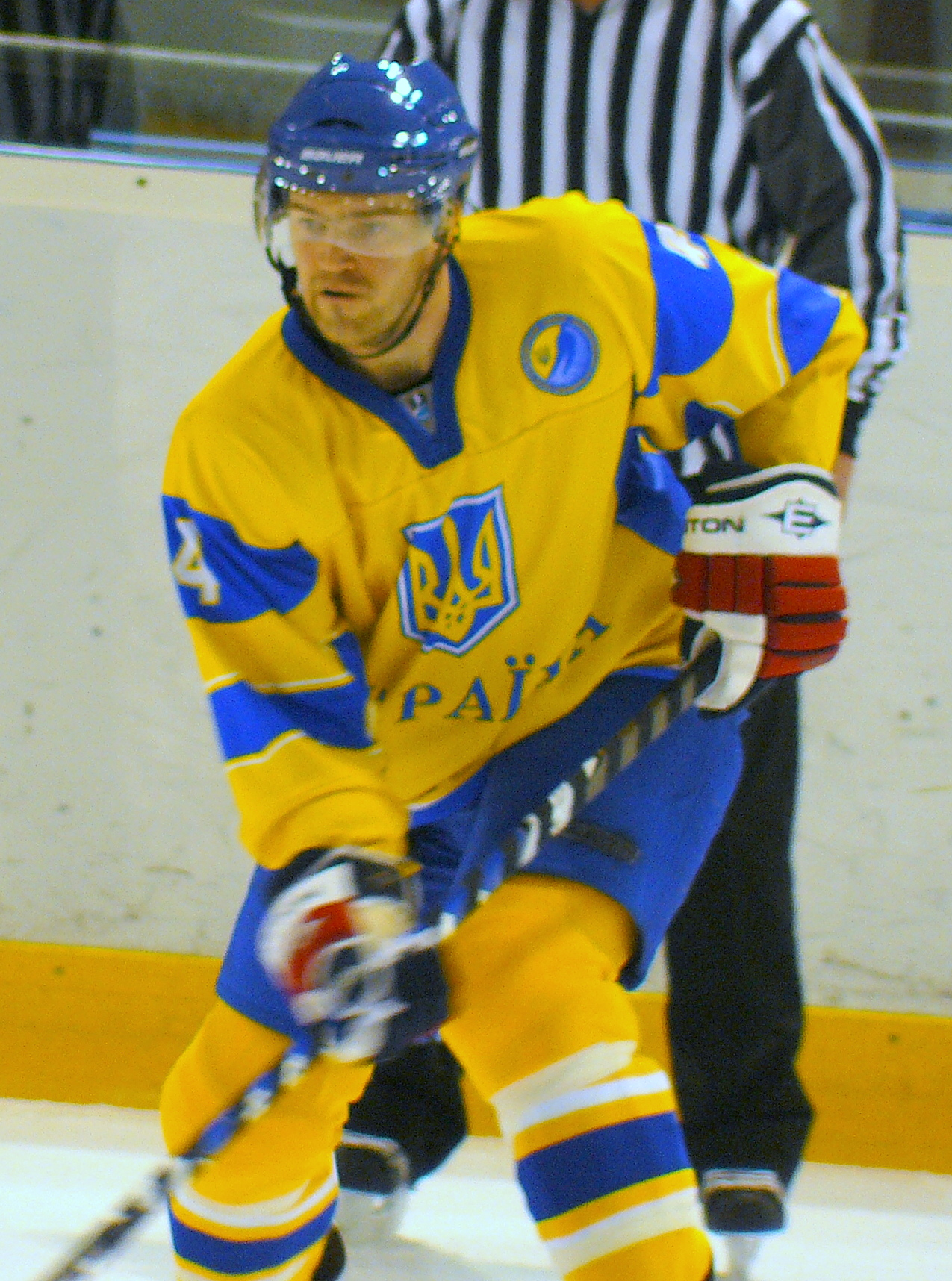
- Tolkunov in 2010

Personal information
- Born: 27 May 1979 (age 47) Kyiv, Ukrainian SSR, Soviet Union
- Height: 190 cm (6 ft 3 in)
- Weight: 92 kg (203 lb)

Sport
- Sport: Ice hockey

Dmytro Mykolaiovych Tolkunov (Ukrainian: Дмитро Миколайович Толкунов, born 27 May 1979) is a Ukrainian ice hockey defender who competed at the 2002 Winter Olympics and at the 2002, 2004, 2005, 2009 and 2010 world championships. He played for Ukrainian, Russian, Belarusian, Hungarian, Canadian and American clubs, and won the Ukrainian national title in 2011, 2012 and 2015.

== Career statistics ==
=== Regular season and playoffs ===
			Regular season					Playoffs
Season	Team	League	GP	G	A	Pts	PIM	GP	G	A	Pts	PIM
1994–95	Sokil–2 Kyiv	RUS.2	2	0	1	1	0	—	—	—	—	—
1995–96	Sokil Kyiv	RUS	1	1	0	1	0	—	—	—	—	—
1995–96	Sokil Kyiv	EEHL	18	2	2	4	12	—	—	—	—	—
1995–96	Dynamo–2 Moscow	RUS.2	1	0	1	1	4	—	—	—	—	—
1996–97	Hull Olympiques	QMJHL	34	3	8	11	39	—	—	—	—	—
1996–97	Beauport Harfangs	QMJHL	27	3	7	10	18	4	0	1	1	4
1997–98	Québec Remparts	QMJHL	66	10	25	35	81	14	3	9	12	22
1998–99	Québec Remparts	QMJHL	69	11	57	68	110	13	2	7	9	22
1999–2000	Cleveland Lumberjacks	IHL	65	3	12	15	54	8	0	0	0	2
2000–01	Norfolk Admirals	AHL	78	5	18	23	93	9	0	1	1	4
2001–02	Norfolk Admirals	AHL	51	1	18	19	20	4	0	0	0	2
2002–03	Norfolk Admirals	AHL	47	1	17	18	39	—	—	—	—	—
2003–04	Lokomotiv Yaroslavl	RSL	6	0	0	0	4	—	—	—	—	—
2003–04	Lokomotiv–2 Yaroslavl	RUS.3	15	4	3	7	39	—	—	—	—	—
2003–04	Amur Khabarovsk	RSL	27	1	2	3	28	—	—	—	—	—
2004–05	Sibir Novosibirsk	RSL	3	0	0	0	2	—	—	—	—	—
2004–05	Amur Khabarovsk	RSL	29	2	8	10	32	9	1	0	1	12
2005–06	Metallurg Novokuznetsk	RSL	43	3	7	10	73	3	0	0	0	4
2006–07	Dinamo Minsk	BLR	25	6	5	11	18	6	0	1	1	4
2006–07	HC Berkut	UKR	6	4	6	10	0	—	—	—	—	—
2007–08	Dinamo Minsk	BLR	29	2	9	11	40	8	1	1	2	14
2007–08	Bilyy Bars Brovary	UKR	10	2	5	7	2	—	—	—	—	—
2008–09	Sokil Kyiv	RUS.2	61	8	20	28	66	2	0	0	0	2
2008–09	Sokil–2 Kyiv	UKR	—	—	—	—	—	2	2	1	3	0
2009–10	Sokil Kyiv	BLR	7	1	2	3	8	—	—	—	—	—
2009–10	Yunost Minsk	BLR	22	2	4	6	4	12	1	2	3	10
2010–11	Ferencvárosi TC	MOL	9	0	1	1	4	—	—	—	—	—
2010–11	Donbass Donetsk	UKR	16	4	7	11	6	—	—	—	—	—
2011–12	Donbass Donetsk	VHL	22	0	2	2	14	—	—	—	—	—
2011–12	Donbass–2 Donetsk	UKR	16	1	6	7	6	—	—	—	—	—
2012–13	Sokil Kyiv	UKR	33	3	8	11	18	9	2	1	3	4
2013–14	Bilyy Bars Bila Tserkva	UKR	24	5	5	10	6	7	0	0	0	6
2014–15	ATEK Kyiv	UKR	4	0	3	3	0	5	0	4	4	4
2015–16	General Kyiv	UKR	31	5	17	22	45	9	0	1	1	16
2016–17	General Kyiv	UKR	14	1	2	3	8	—	—	—	—	—
2016–17	Bilyy Bars Bila Tserkva	UKR	20	2	6	8	8	—	—	—	—	—
2017–18	Progym Gheorgheni	ROU	10	2	6	8	4	—	—	—	—	—
AHL totals			176	7	53	60	152	13	0	1	1	6
RSL totals			79	4	9	13	107	3	0	0	0	4
UKR totals			174	27	65	92	99	32	4	7	11	30

=== International ===
Year	Team	Event	GP	G	A	Pts	PIM
1995	Ukraine	EJC C1	4	0	0	0	6
1996	Ukraine	WJC	6	0	2	2	10
1997	Ukraine	WJC B	7	0	5	5	0
1997	Ukraine	EJC	6	1	0	1	10
2002	Ukraine	OG	4	0	0	0	4
2002	Ukraine	WC	6	0	1	1	8
2004	Ukraine	WC	6	2	1	3	0
2005	Ukraine	WC	6	0	0	0	6
2009	Ukraine	OGQ	3	0	0	0	4
2010	Ukraine	WC D1	5	2	2	4	0
Junior totals			23	1	7	8	26
Senior totals			30	4	4	8	22

"Dmytro Tolkunov". Elite Prospects.
