= Anatolii Brezvin =

Ukrainian businessman, politician and ice hockey executive (born 1956)

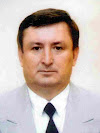
- Brezvin in 2006

Member of the Kyiv City Council
- In office 1998–2014

Personal details
- Born: 8 January 1956 (age 70) Holoby, Ukrainian Soviet Socialist Republic
- Party: People's Party of Ukraine
- Education: PhD economics (2002)
- Alma mater: Kyiv Institute of National Economy; Ukrainian Academy of Foreign Trade
- Occupation: Businessman, politician
- Known for: State Tax Administration of Ukraine; Ice Hockey Federation of Ukraine
- Awards: Order of Merit; Order of Prince Yaroslav the Wise; Honored Economist of Ukraine; Paul Loicq Award

Anatolii Ivanovych Brezvin (Ukrainian: Анатолій Іванович Брезвін) (born 8 January 1956) is a Ukrainian former businessman, politician, and ice hockey executive. He earned an industrial accounting degree from Kyiv Institute of National Economy, a degree in international law and a Doctor of Philosophy in economics from Ukrainian Academy of Foreign Trade. He worked as a senior economist for the Kyiv City State Administration, and was head of the financial department for the Podilskyi District and Minskyi District councils. He later worked various positions in the State Tax Administration of Ukraine, and was chairman of the Ukrgasbank board of directors. In politics, he served on the Minskyi District Council, and on the Kyiv City Council as a member of the People's Party of Ukraine. Honors received include the Order of Merit first class, the Order of Prince Yaroslav the Wise V degree, and being named an Honored Economist of Ukraine.

As president of the Ice Hockey Federation of Ukraine from 2006 to 2020, Brezvin oversaw establishment of a national youth hockey championship and the Ukrainian Cup, then its replacement by the Ukrainian Federation Cup. He endeavored to open 60 ice rinks to grow hockey in Ukraine, although only 12 new rinks and two refurbishments were completed. He transferred hosting duties for the Ukrainian Hockey Championship to the Professional Hockey League, but saw a decline in success of the Ukraine men's national team at the Ice Hockey World Championships which he attributed to the best players being absent due to commitments to professional leagues. He created a Ukrainian women's championship, entered the Ukraine women's national team into the World Women's Championship, and oversaw hosting 17 International Ice Hockey Federation (IIHF) events in Ukraine. He was awarded the Paul Loicq Award from the IIHF in 2024, for his contributions to international ice hockey.

== Early life and education ==
Anatolii Ivanovich Brezvin was born on 8 January 1956, in Holoby, Volyn Oblast, and grew up in a working class family. He worked at a fruit canning facility in Golobsky from 1973 to 1974, operated by the government procurement department of the Volyn Oblast. Late in 1974, he worked two months at a sugar beet processing facility in Volodymyr-Volynsky operated by the Ministry of Food Industry of the Ukrainian Soviet Socialist Republic. He served in the Soviet Army from 1974 to 1976, as an instructor of Military Unit 27898.

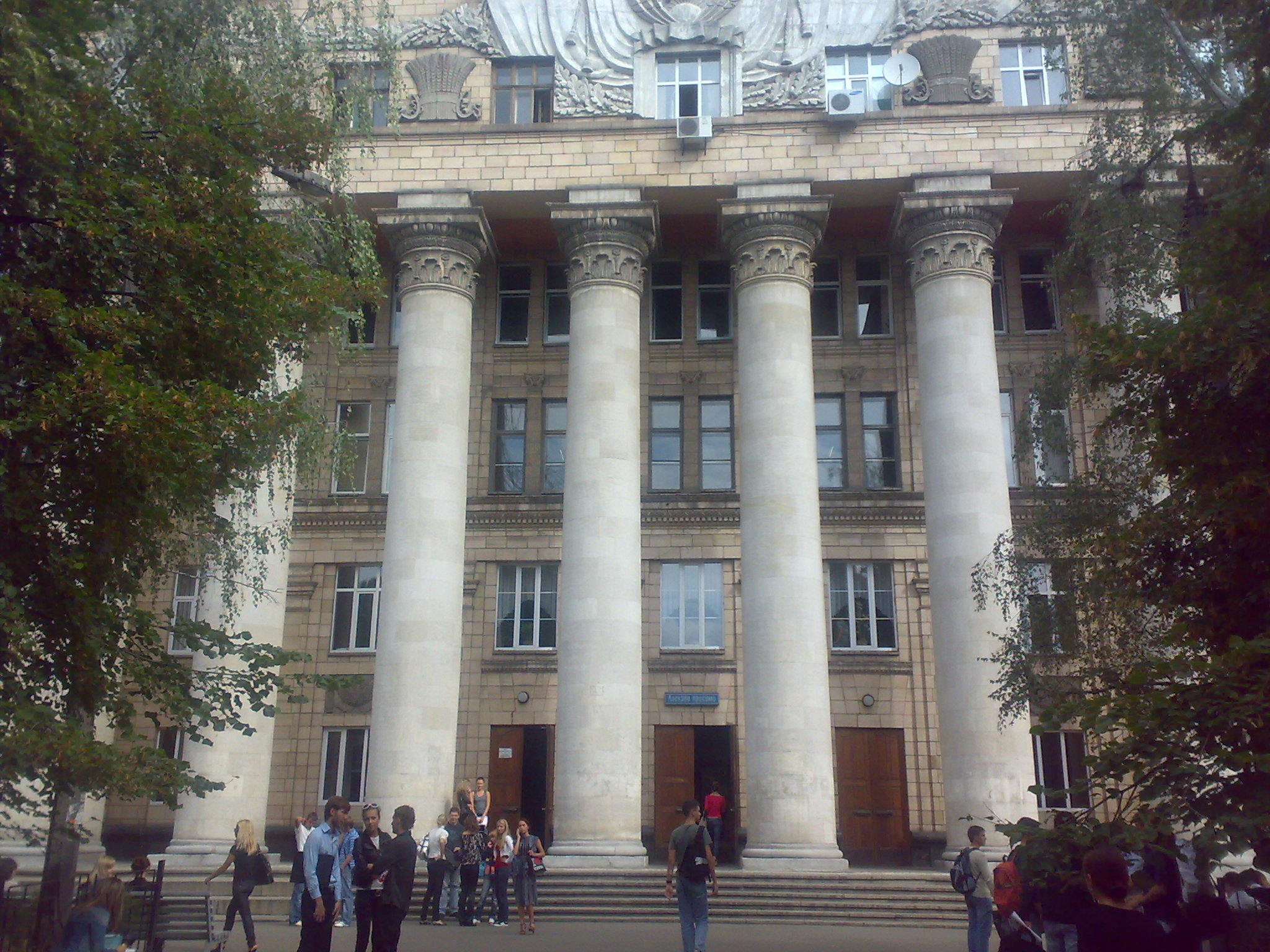
Main building of the Kyiv Institute of National Economy

Brezvin studied at the Kyiv Institute of National Economy from 1977 to 1981, graduating with an industrial accounting degree. He earned a degree in international law from the Ukrainian Academy of Foreign Trade in 2001, followed by a Doctor of Philosophy in economics with the dissertation "Economic Methods of Regulation of Industrial Processing of Agricultural Products" in 2002.

== Business career ==
From 1981 to 1984, Brezvin was a senior economist for the Kyiv City State Administration financial department. He served as the deputy head, then head of the Podilskyi District Council financial department from 1984 to 1987. He was subsequently head of the Minskyi District Council financial department from 1987 to 1990.

Brezvin later worked various positions in the State Tax Administration of Ukraine. He was head of the Minskyi District tax administration from 1990 to 1996, and the Kyiv City tax administration from 1996 to 2005. He also served as deputy head of the State Tax Administration of Ukraine from December 1998 to April 2005.

After the Orange Revolution in 2005, Brezvin was replaced at the national tax administration while remaining at the city-level position until September. He returned to the State Tax Administration in August 2006, when Viktor Yanukovych led the national government. Brezvin resigned in December 2007, shortly after the formation of the Yulia Tymoshenko government.

When Brezvin was appointed chairman of the Ukrgasbank board of directors in June 2010, the decision was criticized as contrary to the law of Ukraine which required this position be filled by a person with three years of experience operating a bank. Kommersant reported that stock market investors called Brezvin a "creature" of Ukrainian prime minister Mykola Azarov. Upon becoming chairman, Brezvin claimed that Ukrgasbank would grow faster than the market, and planned to expand clientele by offering payroll and other services. He was also tasked with restoring the bank's reputation, increasing profitability, and managing non-performing loans. In 2011, Brezvin was replaced as chairman by Sergey Mamedov.

== Political career ==
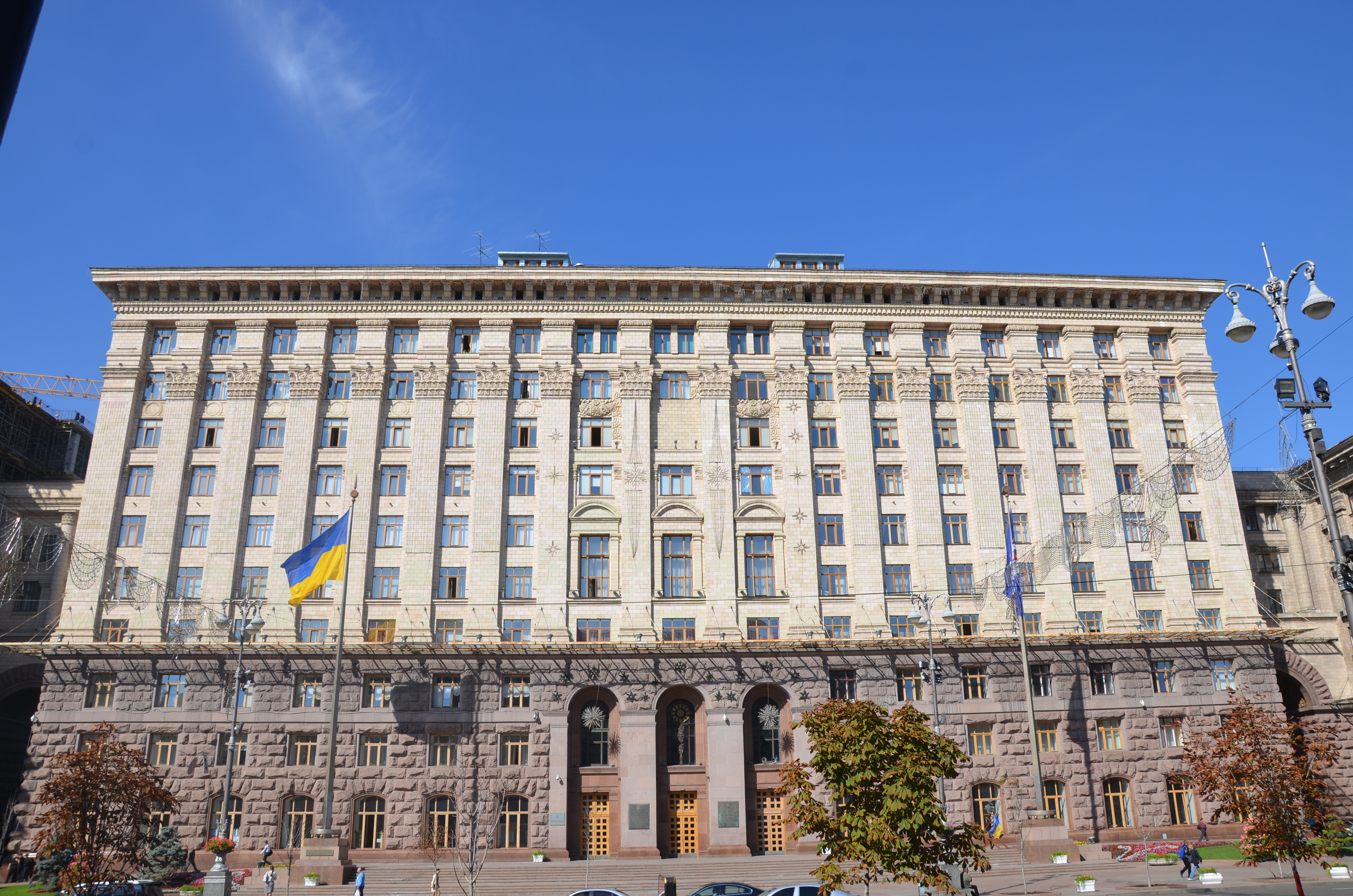
Kyiv City Council building

Brezvin was an elected member of the Minskyi District Council from 1987 to 1998. He was elected to the Kyiv City Council in 1998, where he served as deputy chairman of the standing committee for the budget and socio-economic development. From 2002 to 2014, he sat on the Kyiv City Council as a member of the People's Party of Ukraine, and was part of an alliance with the Lytvyn's People's Bloc from 2008 onward.

== Ice hockey career ==
Brezvin was elected president of the Ice Hockey Federation of Ukraine (FHU) on 8 December 2006. During his tenure, the FHU established partnerships to provide equipment to schools and youth hockey programs to make playing more affordable, but noted a lack of ice rinks for games.

In 2007, Brezvin began a program to open 60 ice rinks in the country within five years. Each rink was intended to become the base for development of sports in its region. According to Brezvin in 2008, implementing the program was problematic in some cities due to the lack of public funds and land allocated for rinks, and lack of investors. The program was extended by four years in 2012, when only 12 new rinks and two refurbishments were completed. Kyiv had a shortage of ice rinks, and only one stadium for hockey as of 2012. Brezvin promised four additional rinks for Kyiv within 18 months, and eventually 10 ice rinks in the city. Despite the Russo-Ukrainian War that began in 2014, Brezvin urged the federal government to follow the example of private investors into hockey.

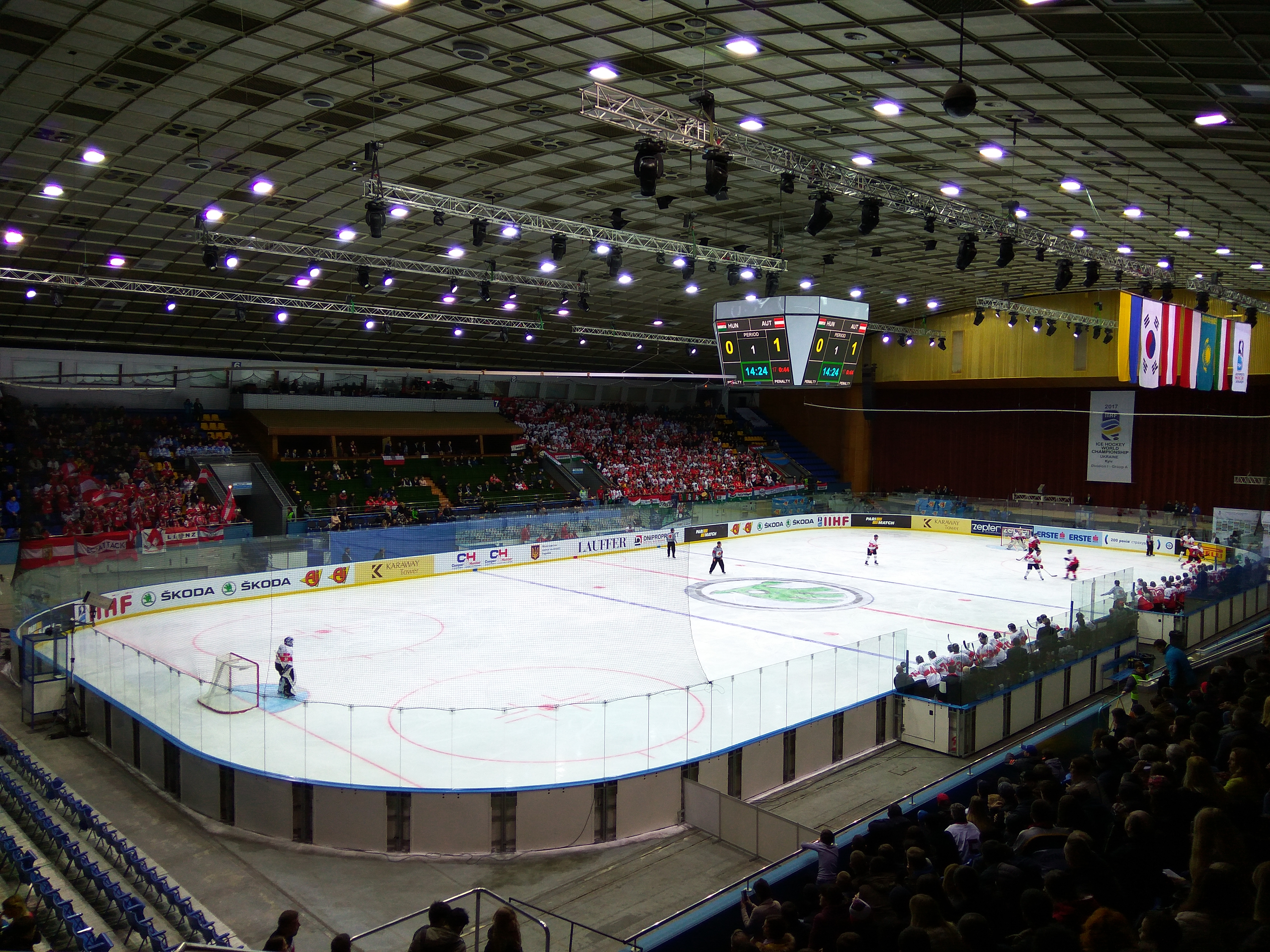
Palace of Sports, Kyiv, during the 2017 IIHF World Championship

During Brezvin's tenure as president, he helped establish a national youth hockey championship, then established the Ukrainian Cup in 2007, and its replacement by the Ukrainian Federation Cup in 2008. In 2011, he agreed to transfer host duties of the Ukrainian Hockey Championship to the Professional Hockey League. He oversaw Ukraine hosting 17 International Ice Hockey Federation (IIHF) events at various levels, including several junior ice hockey tournaments, and division 1-B tournaments for the 2011 Men's World Championships and the 2013 Men's World Championships. He also created a Ukrainian women's championship, and entered the Ukraine women's national team into the IIHF World Women's Championship.

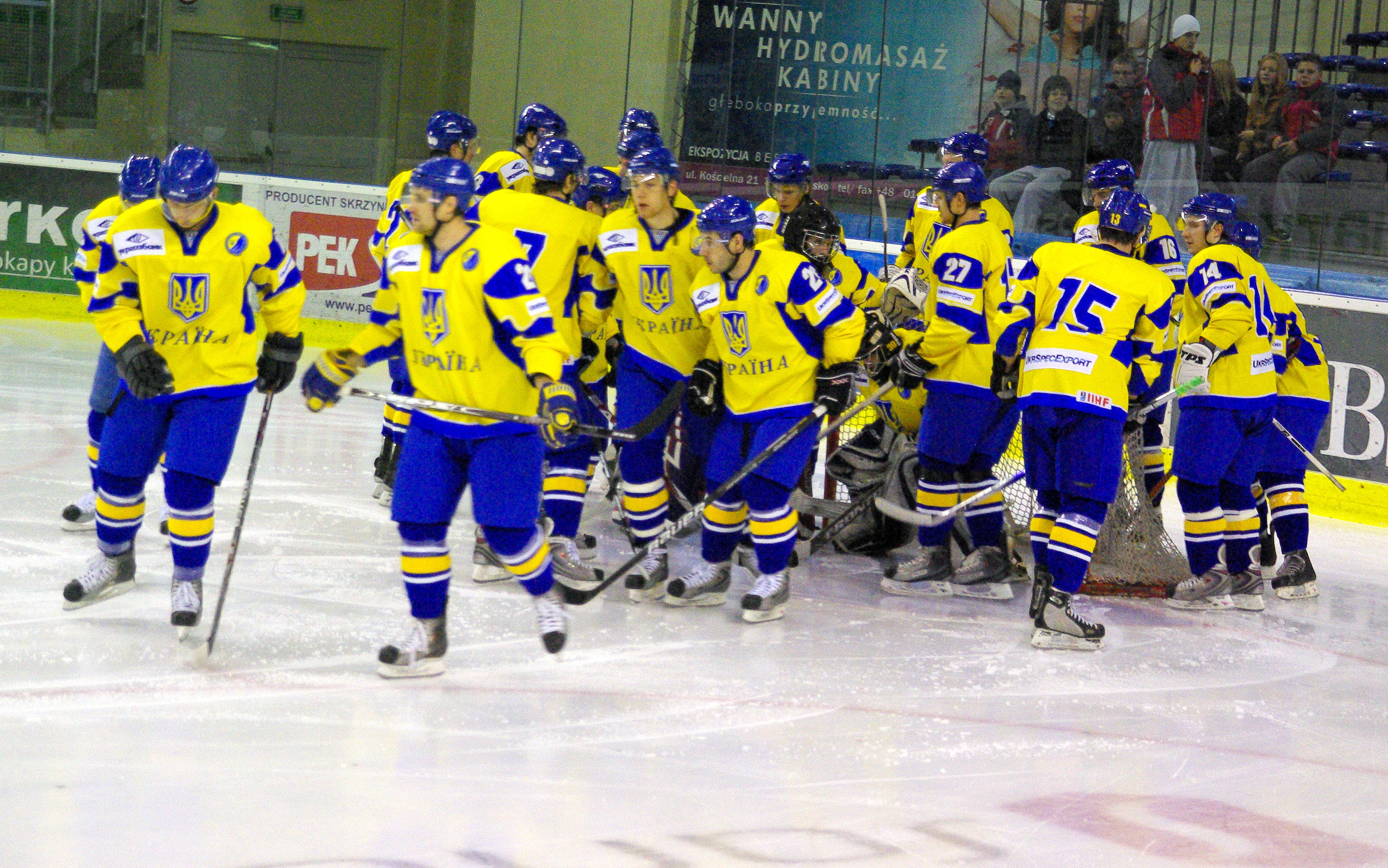
Ukraine men's national team in 2010

In Brezvin's first year as president, the Ukraine men's national team placed 16th at the 2007 World Championship, and was relegated to Division I. When placing second at the 2008 World Championship Division I, the national team did not regain its place in the top tier. Brezvin expected five to seven years to develop the necessary talent, and did not consider it a failure. When the national team placed last at the 2015 World Championship Division I and was relegated to Division II, he felt the result was due to the best Ukrainian players being absent from the national team since they played instead in professional leagues. He also noted that the Russo-Ukrainian War aborted an attempt to give naturalized-citizen status to Russian players in Ukraine, and disrupted development of the Ukraine men's national junior team. By 2019, the Ukraine national team ranking had fallen to 27th overall, from 12th overall in 2006.

In September 2020, 67 Ukrainians including national team members and National Hockey League players, sent a letter to the president of Ukraine, the prime minister of Ukraine, and the National Olympic Committee of Ukraine chairman, calling attention to the actions of Brezvin, and the regression of Ukrainian hockey and the national team since he became president. Grievances included needed upgrades to the Palace of Sports in Kyiv, lack of success at international competitions, and a general lack of trust of confidence in the FHU.

Brezvin did not stand for re-election as president at the 2020 general meeting. He was subsequently named honorary president of the FHU, and credited by the IIHF for "[playing] a role in ensuring the safety of more than 2,500 players" during the Russian invasion of Ukraine in 2022. He stated in 2024, "As our beloved Ukraine is enduring the worst ... the game of hockey is especially important for our children. It helps to preserve their physical and mental health while facing the horrors of war".

In 2024, Channel 24 News reported that Brezvin wanted to return pro-Russian persons to senior positions within the FHU, and that he "unreasonably disrupted" the general meeting. Channel 24 News opined that "Brezvin did not work for the benefit of Ukrainian sports", which included his appointment of pro-Russian persons as vice-presidents of the FHU in 2008.

== Honors and awards ==
Brezvin was awarded the Order of Merit third class in 1997. It was upgraded to second class in 1999, and to first class in 2004. He was made an Honored Economist of Ukraine for contributions to the development of the tax service. Other honors include the Order of Prince Yaroslav the Wise V degree, the order "For the Development of Ukraine" IV degree in 2001, and the medal "For Labor Distinction" in 2002.

In recognition of developing international ice hockey, Brezvin received the Paul Loicq Award from the IIHF in 2024. The award was presented during the IIHF Hall of Fame induction ceremony.

== Personal life ==
Brezvin has served as chairman of the board of the non-governmental organization Наш вибір [Our Choice]. His hobbies include swimming, fishing, and hunting. He is married, and has two sons and one daughter.
