= 2008–09 Ukrainian Hockey Championship =

- League: Ukrainian Hockey Championship
- Sport: Ice hockey
- Number of teams: 13

Regular season
- Regular season winners: HK ATEK Kyiv

Playoffs
- Finals champions: Sokil Kyiv
- Runners-up: Bilyi Bars Brovary

Ukrainian Hockey Championship seasons
- ← 2007–08 2009–10 →

The 2008–09 Ukrainian Hockey League season was the 17th season of the Ukrainian Hockey League, the top level of ice hockey in Ukraine. 13 teams participated in the league, and HC Sokil Kyiv won the championship.

== Vyscha Liha regular season ==
=== Central Division ===
	Club	GP	W	OTW	OTL	L	GF:GA	Pts
1.	HK ATEK Kyiv	29	18	0	2	9	143:73	56
2.	Bilyi Bars Brovary	29	16	2	2	9	163:116	54
3.	HC Kharkiv	29	16	2	1	10	147:77	53
4.	HK Kompanion Kyiv	29	13	3	2	11	153:95	47
5.	Sokil Kyiv	29	12	2	2	13	128:109	42

=== West Division ===
	Club	GP	W	OTW	OTL	L	GF:GA	Pts
1.	Vatra Ivano-Frankivsk	16	8	0	1	7	103:121	25
2.	Ekspres Lviv	16	6	1	0	9	112:145	20
3.	Patriot Vinnytsia	14	3	0	0	11	72:139	9

=== East Division ===
	Club	GP	W	OTW	OTL	L	GF:GA	Pts
1.	Donbas Donetsk	19	14	0	0	5	134:66	42
2.	Prydniprovsk Dnipropetrovsk	19	12	0	1	6	104:90	37
3.	SDYuSShOR-Misto Kharkiv	19	7	1	1	10	86:132	24
4.	Vorony Sumy	19	5	1	0	13	88:133	17
5.	Zaporizki Morzhi Zaporizhia	19	1	0	0	18	65:202	3

== Ukrainian Championship playoffs ==
=== First Qualification Round ===
- Vorony Sumy - Donbas Donetsk 0:2
- Patriot Vinnytsia - Ekspres Lviv 0:2
- SDYuSShOR-Misto Kharkiv - Prydniprovsk Dnipropetrovsk 1:2

=== Second Qualification Round ===
- Prydniprovsk Dnipropetrovsk - Vatra Ivano-Frankivsk 2:0
- Ekspres Lviv - Donbas Donetsk 0:2

=== Quarterfinals ===
- Vatra Ivano-Frankivsk - HK ATEK Kyiv 0:2
- Prydniprovsk Dnipropetrovsk - Bilyi Bars Brovary 0:2
- Sokil Kyiv - HK Kompanion Kyiv 2:0
- Donbas Donetsk - HC Kharkiv 0:2

=== Semifinals ===
- Sokil Kyiv - HK ATEK Kyiv 2:0
- HK Kompanion Kyiv - Bilyi Bars Brovary 1:2

=== 3rd place ===
- HC Kharkiv - HK ATEK Kyiv 1:2

=== Final ===
- Sokil Kyiv - Bilyi Bars Brovary 2:0
