= 2009–10 Ukrainian Hockey Championship =

- League: Ukrainian Championship
- Sport: Ice hockey
- Duration: 2009–10
- Teams: 15

Regular season
- Regular season winners: HC Berkut
- Runners-up: HC Kharkiv

Playoffs
- Finals champions: Sokil Kyiv
- Runners-up: HC Berkut

Ukrainian Hockey Championship seasons
- ← 2008–09 2010–11 →

The 2009–10 or XVIII Ukrainian Hockey Championship was the 18th annual edition of the Ukrainian Hockey Championship, and final season for the Ukrainian Major League. It took place from October 18, 2009, April 9, 2010. 6 teams participated in Division A, three teams in Division B, and six teams in Division C. HC Sokil Kyiv won the championship.

== First round ==
=== Division A - Central ===
	Club	GP	W	OTW	OTL	L	GF:GA	Pts
1.	Berkut Kyiv	20	15	0	1	4	134:76	46
2.	HC Kharkiv	20	14	0	0	6	105:66	42
3.	Sokil Kyiv	20	12	1	0	7	115:58	38
4.	Bilyi Bars Brovary	20	11	1	1	7	97:73	36
5.	Donbas Donetsk	20	5	0	1	14	52:100	16
6.	Vorony Sumy	20	0	1	0	19	37:167	2

=== Division B - Southern ===
	Club	GP	W	OTW	OTL	L	GF:GA	Pts
1.	Dnipro Kherson	8	8	0	0	0	75:25	24
2.	HC Odesa	8	2	0	0	6	26:50	6
3.	Lehion Simferopol	8	2	0	0	6	37:63	6

=== Division C - Western ===
	Club	GP	W	OTW	OTL	L	GF:GA	Pts
1.	Vatra Ivano-Frankivsk	10	9	0	0	1	25:15	27
2.	Olimpiya Kalush	10	6	0	0	4	53:27	18
3.	Ekspres Lviv	10	6	0	0	4	44:21	18
4.	HC Lutsk	10	5	0	0	5	42:17	15
5.	Yavir Yavoriv	10	3	0	0	7	34:40	9
6.	VIM-Berkut Lviv	10	0	0	0	10	5:83	0

== Playoffs ==
=== Qualification ===
- Dnipro Kherson - Vorony Sumy 2:14/1:6
- Vatra Ivano-Frankivsk - HC Donbass 4:3 OT/1:4/0:5 Forfeit

=== Quarterfinals ===
- Vorony Sumy - HC Sokil Kyiv 0:5/1:15
- HC Donbass - Bilyi Bars Brovary 0:4/2:6

=== Semifinals ===
- Bilyi Bars Brovary - HC Berkut-Kyiv 1:3/0:7
- HC Sokil Kyiv - HC Kharkiv 4:1/3:2

=== 3rd place ===
- Bilyi Bars Brovary - HC Kharkiv 2:3 OT/3:6

=== Final ===
- HC Sokil Kyiv - HC Berkut-Kyiv 5:2/3:2 OT
