= Ice Hockey Federation of Ukraine =

Sports governing body in Ukraine

Ukraine
- Association name: Ice Hockey Federation of Ukraine
- IIHF Code: UKR
- Founded: February 20, 1992
- IIHF membership: May 6, 1992
- President: Gennadiy Zubko
- IIHF men's ranking: 19

The Ice Hockey Federation of Ukraine (Ukrainian: Федерація хокею України, Federatsiya khokeyu Ukrayiny, FHU) is the official governing body for ice hockey in Ukraine. It became a member of the International Ice Hockey Federation (IIHF) on May 6, 1992.

== Presidents ==
- 1992–1997: Anatoli Khorozov
- 1997–2006: Oleksandr Omelchenko
- 2006–2020: Anatolii Brezvin
- 2020–present: Heorhiy Zubko

== National teams ==
- Ukraine men's national ice hockey team
- Ukraine men's national junior ice hockey team
- Ukraine men's national under-18 ice hockey team
- Ukraine women's national ice hockey team

== Competitions ==
- Ukrainian Hockey Championship
- Professional Hockey League, a failed attempt of establishing a self-governing professional competition among men's ice hockey clubs
- Extra competitions, beside of regular format competitions the federation organized several other competitions: 2007 Ukrainian Cup, 2008 Ukrainian Federation Cup, and 2010 Ukrainian Federation Cup
- Amateur competitions (Western Ukrainian Amateur Hockey League, others)

=== Professional hockey clubs ===
- HC Donbass

Former

- HC Dynamo (Kharkiv), a Soviet team out of Kharkiv
- Sokil Kyiv
- HC Berkut-Kyiv, initially a farm team of Sokil Kyiv
- hockey team of the School of Higher Sport Master (Kyiv)
