= Yavir Yavoriv =

- City: Yavoriv, Ukraine
- League: Western Ukrainian Amateur Hockey League
- Founded: 2009
- Colours: Green, red, white

Franchise history
- 2009-present: Yavir Yavoriv

Yavir Yavoriv is an ice hockey team in Yavoriv, Ukraine, that is currently playing in the Western Ukrainian Amateur Hockey League. During the 2009-10 season, the club participated in Division C (the Western Group) of the Ukrainian Hockey League. They finished in fifth place in the group with a record of three wins and seven losses, with 34 goals for and 40 against.

== Achievements ==
- WUAHL champion (1): 2012.
