= Yunost Kharkiv =

Yunist' Kharkiv
- City: Kharkiv, Ukraine
- League: Ukrainian Hockey League (2016–present); Ukrainian Hockey Extra League (2015–2016)
- Founded: 2015
- Operated: 2015–present
- Home arena: Saltivs’kyỹ Lid Ice Arena(Capacity 500)
- Head coach: (Ukraine) Valeri Plyashechnik

Yunist' Kharkiv (Ukrainian: Юність Харків) is an ice hockey team based in Kharkiv, Ukraine, playing in the Ukrainian Hockey League.

== History ==
The club formed in 2015, and joined the Ukrainian Hockey Extra League prior to the 2015-16 season. The first season, the club ended up at the eight and final place in the regular season.
