= HC Vityaz Kharkiv =

HK Vytyaz' Kharkiv
- City: Kharkiv, Ukraine
- League: Ukrainian Hockey League (2016–present)
- Founded: 2001
- Operated: 2001-02, 2014–present
- Home arena: Arena SDJuSSzOR
- Head coach: (Ukraine) Vitalij Lytvynenko
- Captain: (Ukraine) Olexei Lazarenko

HK Vytyaz' Kharkiv (Ukrainian: Витязь Харків) is an ice hockey team based in Kharkiv, Ukraine, playing in the Ukrainian Hockey League.

== History ==
The club was formed in 2001 and played the 2001–02 season in the second division of the Eastern European Hockey League.

After some years of inactivity, the club joined the Ukrainian League prior to the 2014–15 season. The first year in the league, the team ended at fourth and last place in the regular season. However, as all team reached the playoffs, the team played in semifinals where they lost to HK Kremenchuk.

Prior to the 2015–16 Ukrainian season, the league in Ukraine took the name Ukrainian Hockey Extra League. Several new and old teams joined the league to a total number of eight. Vityaz reached the playoffs by ending up at the fourth place in the regular season even this year. Well in the playoffs, the team lost in the semifinal to HK Donbass (who later became the champions) in three straight games.
