= HC Lutsk =

- City: Lutsk, Ukraine
- Founded: 2005
- Colours: Blue, white, red

HC Lutsk is an ice hockey team in Lutsk, Ukraine. The club was founded in 2005.

== Overview ==
They took part in Division C (the Western Group) of the Ukrainian Hockey League during the 2009-10 season. Lutsk finished in fourth place in the group with a record of five wins and five losses, with 42 goals for and 17 against.

The club played in the Western Ukrainian Amateur Hockey League during the 2010-11 season.
