= 2024–25 Ukrainian Hockey Championship =

2024–25 Ukrainian Hockey League
- League: Italian Hockey League
- Sport: Ice hockey
- Duration: 1 November 2024 – 11 April 2025
- Games: Regular season: 90; Postseason: 17
- Teams: 6

Regular season
- Season champions: Sokil Kyiv
- Runners-up: Kyiv Capitals

Playoffs
- Finals champions: HK Kremenchuk
- Runners-up: Kyiv Capitals

Ukrainian Hockey Championship seasons
- ← 2023–24 2025–26 →

The 2024–25 Ukrainian Hockey Championship was the 33rd year of professional ice hockey in Ukraine. The regular season ran from 1 November 2024 to 20 March 2025 with Sokil Kyiv finishing atop the standings. The Postseason ran from 7 March to 11 April 2025. HK Kremenchuk defeated Kyiv Capitals 4 games to 3 for the league championship.

== Bombed arenas ==
- Shortly after the end of the season, the Favorit Arena in Kherson was destroyed by a Russian guided aerial bomb. The attack came during a Russian assault against civilian targets that also damaged a supermarket, apartment buildings and private property, a common occurrence during the Russo-Ukrainian War.
- Several months later, the Palace of Sports, Odesa was hit by Shahed drone. While the building wasn't destroyed, it was damaged heavily and forced Storm Odesa to relocate to a new home arena.

== Teams ==
2024–25 Ukrainian Hockey Championship teams.

Team	City	Arena	Coach
Dnipro Kherson	Kherson	Favorit Arena	(Ukraine) Konstantin Butsenko
HK Kremenchuk	Kremenchuk	Aysberh Arena	(Ukraine) Andrei Sryubko
Kyiv Capitals	Kyiv	Palace of Sports, Kyiv	(Ukraine) Vadym Shakhraychuk
Sokil Kyiv	Kyiv	Palace of Sports, Kyiv	(Ukraine) Oleg Shafarenko
Kryzhynka Kyiv	Kyiv	Kryzhynka Ice Stadium	(Ukraine) Olexander Seukand
Storm Odesa	Odesa	Palace of Sports, Odesa	(Ukraine) Olexander Bobkin

== Standings ==
=== Regular season ===
Pos	Team	Pld	W	OTW	OTL	L	GF	GA	GD	Pts	Qualification
1	Sokil Kyiv	30	21	2	1	6	131	64	+67	68	Advanced to Semifinals
2	Kyiv Capitals	30	20	2	3	5	151	57	+94	67	Advanced to Semifinals
3	Storm Odesa	30	18	2	2	8	169	69	+100	60	Advanced to Semifinals
4	HK Kremenchuk	30	18	1	1	10	136	57	+79	57	Advanced to Semifinals
5	Dnipro Kherson	30	6	0	0	24	86	177	−91	18	
6	Kryzhynka Kyiv	30	0	0	0	30	23	272	−249	0	

Source: Alps Hockey League
Rules for classification: 1) Points; 2) Head-to-head points.

=== Statistics ===
==== Scoring leaders ====
Player	Team	Pos	GP	G	A	Pts
(Ukraine) Yaroslav Panchenko	Kyiv Capitals	F	28	24	17	41
(Ukraine) Viktor Zakharov	Sokil Kyiv	C	23	27	13	40
(Latvia) Deniss Berbniks	Kyiv Capitals	D	27	10	30	40
(Ukraine) Sevastian Karpenko	Kyiv Capitals	C	25	23	14	37
(Ukraine) Vitalii Lialka	HK Kremenchuk	LW/RW	25	22	15	37
(Ukraine) Nikita Sidorenko	Storm Odesa	F	23	21	14	35
(Ukraine) Ilya Kriklya	Storm Odesa	C	25	11	24	35
(Ukraine) Nikita Oleynik	Kyiv Capitals	F	25	6	25	31
(Ukraine) Andrei Krivonozhkin	Kyiv Capitals	F	25	15	15	30
(Ukraine) Denis Borodai	Sokil Kyiv	W	22	13	17	30

== Playoffs ==
=== Bracket ===
Semifinals (best-of-7)
1	Sokil Kyiv	1	0	3	3	2*	1	-
4	HK Kremenchuk	3	3	5	1	1	2	-
2	Kyiv Capitals	4	5*	5	2	-	-	-
3	Storm Odesa	2	4	3	1	-	-	-

Championship (best-of-7)
4	HK Kremenchuk	2	4	3	1	3	3*	2*
2	Kyiv Capitals	3*	1	4	3	2	2	1

Note: * denotes overtime period(s)
