= Daria Chubata =

Ukrainian physician, author, and social activist

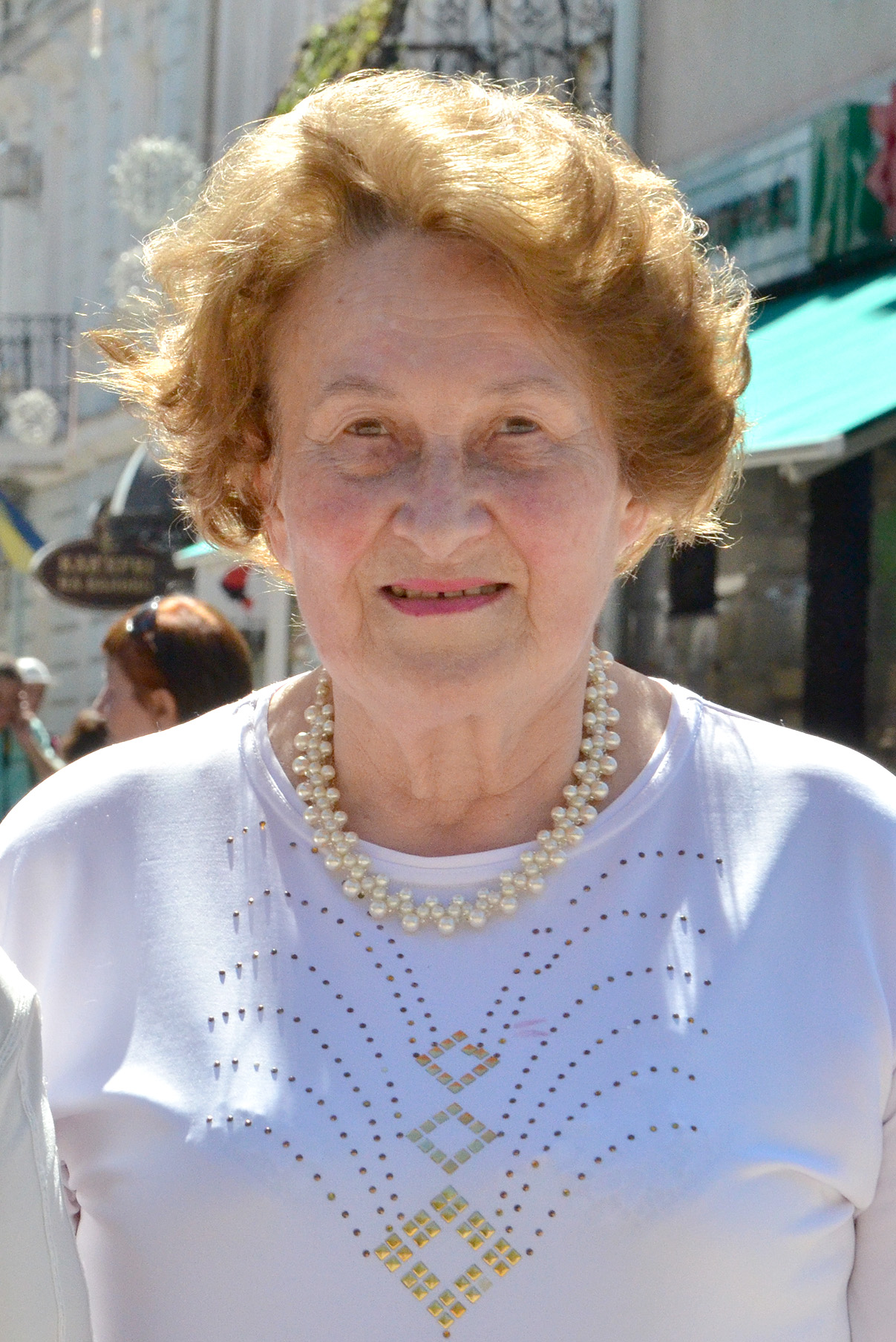
- Daria Chubata (2016)
- Born: Чубата Дарія Дмитрівна; July 27, 1940 (age 85); Ternopil, Ukrainian SSR, Soviet Union
- Education: Ternopil National Medical University
- Occupations: physician; author; social activist

Daria Dmytrivna Chubata (Ukrainian: Чубата Дарія Дмитрівна; born July 27, 1940) is a Ukrainian physician, author, and social activist. She became a member of the National Union of Journalists of Ukraine in 2003, and twice served as a member of the Ternopil Oblast Council (1998-2002, 2002-2006). In 1980, she was awarded the Distinguished Healthcare Worker of the USSR.

== Biography ==
Daria Dmytrivna Chubata was born on July 27, 1940, in Ternopil, Ukraine.

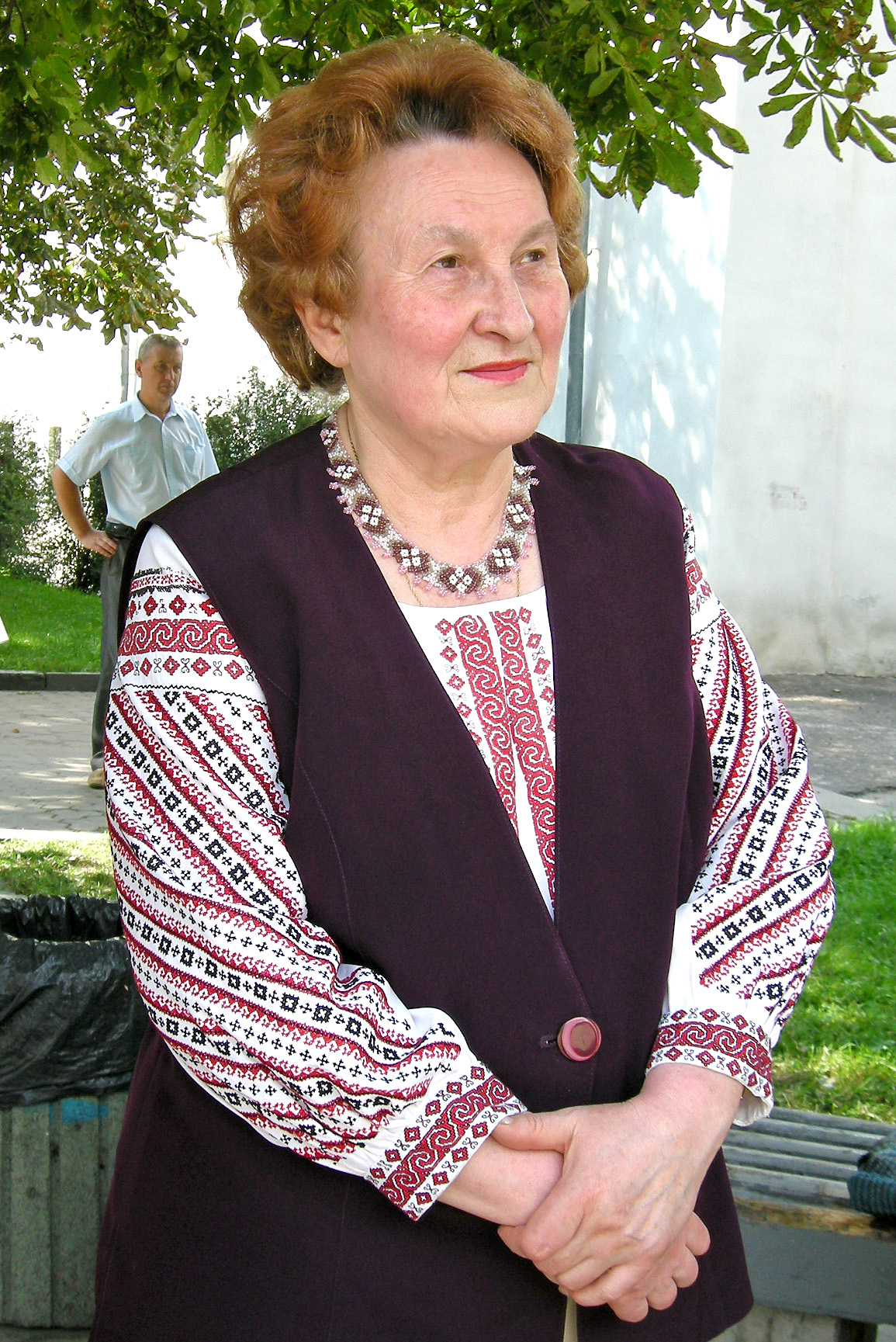
2007

She graduated from Ternopil Medical Institute (1965, now Ternopil National Medical University). She worked as a district therapist in the village of Zalozhka; served as the head of the medical health centers "Elektroarmatura", "Sewing Factory", in the first city hospital. She was the head of the youth's office (1967-1975); from 1975, Deputy Chief doctor; 1996 to present day, rehabilitation specialist of the second city clinical hospital (all in Ternopil). She headed the schools of best practices for doctors of the region who specialized in adolescent (1968-1995), as well as deputy chief physicians of the region on the examination of temporary disability. During the period of 1977–89, she was a freelance Deputy Head of the Ternopil City Health Department. Chubata was a teacher of therapy and health care organization of Ternopil Medical Institute in 1986–90).

Her other activities include chair of the city association "Prosvita" (1997); organizer and chair of the regional Association of Women; participant in the international congress "Women on the threshold of the 21st century." (1998); member of the regional Coordinating Women's Council at the Ternopil Regional State Administration; and co-founder of the Club of Ukrainian Greek Catholic Intelligentsia in Ternopil. She is a member of the editorial board of TPP, and she collaborated with the editorial board of Rada magazine. She became a member of the Lemkivshchyna Society in 2000, and is a member of the Board of the Association of Alumni of Ternopil State Medical University named after I. Gorbachevsky.

Chubata is the author of books, articles in the press, as well as the author or co-author of more than 50 scientific and practical works. Her poems have been set to music by composers Mykola Bolotny, Ivan Vyspinsky, Ihor Vovchak, Vasyl Dunets, Yuriy Kitsyla, Zinovia Prysukhina, and others. Mykola Kryvetsky translated some of Chubata's poems into Esperanto. Her awards include Order of Prince Yaroslav the Wise 5th degree (2009).

== Family ==
Her husband is Oleg Chubaty.

== Selected works ==
=== Books ===
- Триєдність (1999)
- Трилисник (2001)
- Веселі каруселі (2001)
- Три дороги (2003)
- Перелуння (2006)
- Мелодійні грона (2011)
- Просвітянські будні і свята (2012)
- Українську святиню — українському народові (2012, as one of the editors of international scientific conferences with A. Hudyma)

== Awards ==
- Order of Merit, 3rd class (2005).
- Order of Prince Yaroslav the Wise, 5th class (2009).
