= Olimpiya Kalush =

Olimpiya Kalush is an ice hockey team in Kalush, Ukraine. They were founded in 2002

Kalush participated in Division C (the Western group) of the Ukrainian Hockey League during the 2009-10 season. They finished in second place in the group with a record of six wins and four losses, with 53 goals for and 27 against.

They played in the Western Ukrainian Amateur Hockey League during the 2010-11 season.
