= 1993–94 Ukrainian Hockey Championship =

- League: Ukrainian Hockey Championship
- Sport: Ice hockey
- Number of teams: 6

Regular season
- Champions: ShVSM Kyiv
- Runners-up: HC Sokil Kyiv

Ukrainian Hockey Championship seasons
- ← 1992–93 1994–95 →

The 1993–94 Ukrainian Hockey League season was the second season of the Ukrainian Hockey League, the top level of ice hockey in Ukraine. Six teams participated in the league, and ShVSM Kyiv won the championship.

== First round ==
| | Club | GP | W | T | L | GF:GA | Pts |
|---|---|---|---|---|---|---|---|
| 1. | ShVSM Kyiv | 4 | 4 | 0 | 0 | 28:7 | 8 |
| 2. | Sokil-2 | 4 | 3 | 0 | 1 | 16:18 | 6 |
| 3. | Salamandra Kharkiv | 4 | 2 | 0 | 2 | 11:13 | 4 |
| 4. | Politekhnik Kyiv | 4 | 1 | 0 | 3 | 22:14 | 2 |
| 5. | HK Kryzhynka Kyiv | 4 | 0 | 0 | 4 | 11:36 | 0 |

== Final round ==
| | Club | GF:GA | Pts |
|---|---|---|---|
| 1. | ShVSM Kyiv | 11:4 | 4 |
| 2. | HC Sokil Kyiv | 13:6 | 2 |
| 3. | HC Sokil Kyiv | 3:17 | 0 |
