= Tolkunov =

Tolkunov (Russian: Толкунов) is a Russian masculine surname, its feminine counterpart is Tolkunova. It may refer to

- Dmytro Tolkunov (born 1979), Ukrainian Olympic ice hockey player
- Irina Tolkunova (born 1971), Russian/Kazakhstani water polo player
- Valentina Tolkunova (1946–2010), Russian singer
