= 1994–95 Ukrainian Hockey Championship =

- League: Ukrainian Hockey Championship
- Sport: Ice hockey
- Number of teams: 7

Regular season
- Champions: HC Sokil Kyiv
- Runners-up: HK ATEK Kyiv

Ukrainian Hockey Championship seasons
- ← 1993–94 1996–97 →

The 1994–95 Ukrainian Hockey League season was the third season of the Ukrainian Hockey League, the top level of ice hockey in Ukraine. Seven teams participated in the league, and HC Sokil Kyiv won the championship.

== First round ==
	Club	GP	W	T	L	GF:GA	Pts
1.	ShVSM Kyiv	5	4	1	0	36:10	9
2.	HK ATEK Kyiv	5	3	1	1	21:17	7
3.	Politekhnik Kyiv	5	3	0	2	21:17	6
4.	Salamandra Kharkiv	5	1	1	3	17:29	3
5.	HK Kryzhynka Kyiv	5	1	1	3	16:30	3
6.	HC Sokil Kyiv II	5	1	0	4	13:33	2

== Final round ==
	Club	GP	W	T	L	GF:GA	Pts
1.	HC Sokil Kyiv	2	2	0	0	12:1	4
2.	HK ATEK Kyiv	2	1	0	1	2:7	2
3.	ShVSM Kyiv	2	0	0	2	0:6	0
