= Ukrainian State University of Finance and International Trade =

University in Ukraine

Coordinates: 48.3042°N 38.0181°E

- Український державний університет фінансів та міжнародної торгівлі
- Active: 2007–2015
- Rector: Olexandr Pokreshchuk
- Students: 2228
- Location: Kyiv, Odesa, Kharkiv, Donetsk, Ukraine

Ukrainian State University of Finance and International Trade is a Ukrainian university.

Post address: Chygorin Street 57, Kyiv, Ukraine 01601

== History ==
USUFIT was created on March 14, 2007 by the Order of Cabinet of Ministers of Ukraine No 98, by unification of Ukrainian Academy of Foreign Trade (Kyiv), and Ukrainian State University of Economics and Finance (Kyiv). According to the Decree of the Cabinet of Ministers of Ukraine dated November 25, 2015 №1223-р. "On the reorganization of the Ukrainian State University of Finance and International Trade" and the Order of the Ministry of Education and Science of Ukraine dated December 17, 2015 № 1309 "On the reorganization of the Ukrainian State University of Finance and International Trade" Ukrainian State University of Finance and International Trade is affiliated with Kyiv National University of Trade and Economics with the formation of the University's structural unit at its base.

== Campuses and buildings ==
- Administrative building – Chygorin Street 57
- Studying building – Chygorin Street 57-A
- Studying building – Raievskiy Street 36
- Faculty of Finance and Economics – Glushkov Street 42 B

== Institutes and faculties ==
- Faculty of Finance and Economics
- Faculty of Law and International Relations
- Faculty of International Economics and Management

== International partners ==
- ICN Business School (France)
- Wroclaw University of Economics (Poland);
- International Business School Solbridge of Woosong University (Korea);
- Mogilev State A. Kuleshov University (Belarus);
- Altai State University (Russia);
- Magnitogorsk State Technical University named after G.I. Nosov (Russia);
- University of Indianapolis, Athens Campus (Greece).

== Notable alumni ==
- Anatolii Brezvin, Ukrainian businessman, politician, ice hockey executive
