= Order of Europe (Ukraine) =

Ukrainian national honour established in 2026

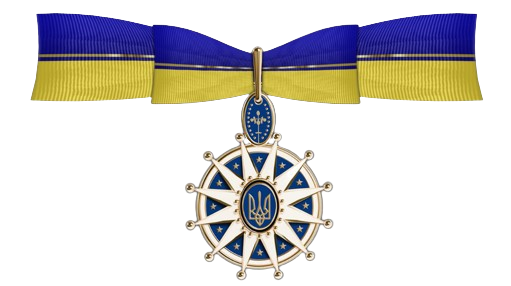
- Medal of the Order of Europe

Awarded by the President of Ukraine
- Type: National order
- Established: 14 July 2026
- Motto: Nobiscum stetit. Historia meminit. (Latin: "Stood with us. History remembers.")
- Eligibility: citizens of Ukraine, foreigners
- Status: Active
- Grades: Knight

Statistics
- First induction: 15 July 2026

Precedence
- Next (higher): Order of Prince Yaroslav the Wise
- Next (lower): Order of Merit
- Ribbon bar of the Order of Europe

The Order of Europe (Ukrainian: Орден Європи, romanized: Orden Yevropy) is a national honour of Ukraine. It was first announced by President Volodymyr Zelenskyy on June 28, 2026 to be awarded to citizens of Ukraine and foreigners for:

- contributions to Ukraine's bid for Accession to the European Union
- contributions to resilience, security and independence of Ukraine and Europe as a whole
- contributions to international cooperation for democracy and peace

The order was proposed to mark the 30th anniversary of the current Constitution of Ukraine. The proposal was submitted as a draft law to the Verkhovna Rada to amend Article 7 of the Law "On State Awards of Ukraine". The bill was approved on 14 July 2026.

A person awarded the Order of Europe is presented with the Order of Europe badge, the Order of Europe star, a miniature Order of Europe badge, the Order of Europe bar, and an order book in a case. A recipient of the order is described as a Knight of the Order of Europe.

== Recipients ==
- Ursula von der Leyen (2026)
