= HC Rapid =

HK Rapid
- City: Kyiv, Ukraine
- League: Not active
- Founded: 2015
- Operated: 2015–2016
- Home arena: Kyiv Sports Palace
- General manager: (Ukraine) Anatoli Davydov
- Head coach: (Ukraine) Oleg Islamov
- Captain: (Russia) Ilya Yelovikov
- Website: www.hc-rapid.com.ua

HK Rapid (Ukrainian: XK Рапид) is a former ice hockey team based in Kyiv, Ukraine.

== History ==
The club was formed in 2015, first by the name Generals Kyiv-2, as the team was planned to act as a farm team for Generals Kyiv. The company Prag Car (official dealer of Škoda in Ukraine) won a tender for the right to name the team, giving the name HK Rapid to the team.

The only season (2015-16) of the club ended with a sixth place (out of eight teams) during the regular season. The team thereby missed the playoffs.
