= HC Kryvbas =

HK Kryvbas
- City: Kryvyi Rih, Ukraine
- League: Ukrainian Hockey League
- Founded: 2016
- Colours
- Head coach: Oleksandr Kulykov

HK Kryvbas (Ukrainian: ХК Кривбас) is an ice hockey club from Kryvyi Rih, Ukraine, that joined the Ukrainian Hockey League prior to the 2016–17 season.
