= Order of Prince Yaroslav the Wise =

Ukrainian order

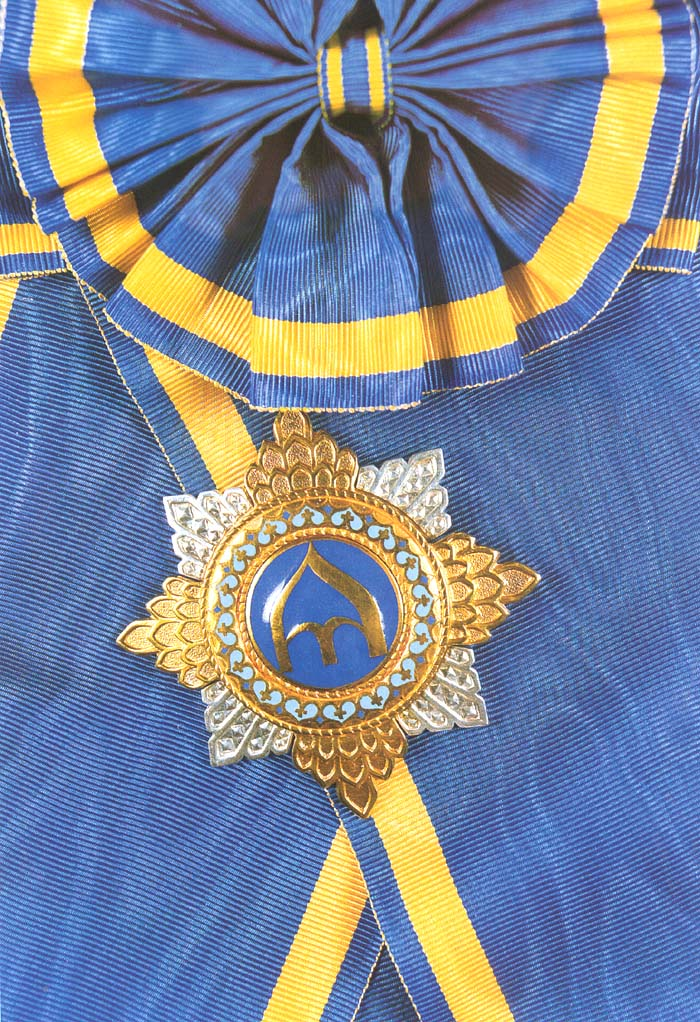
- Star of the Order of Prince Yaroslav the Wise on a shoulder sash

Awarded by the President of Ukraine
- Type: Five-grades order
- Established: 23 August 1995
- Status: Active
- Grades: First Class; Second Class; Third Class; Fourth Class; Fifth Class

Statistics
- First induction: 23 August 1995 (5th Class)

Precedence
- Next (higher): Order of Liberty
- Next (lower): Order of Europe
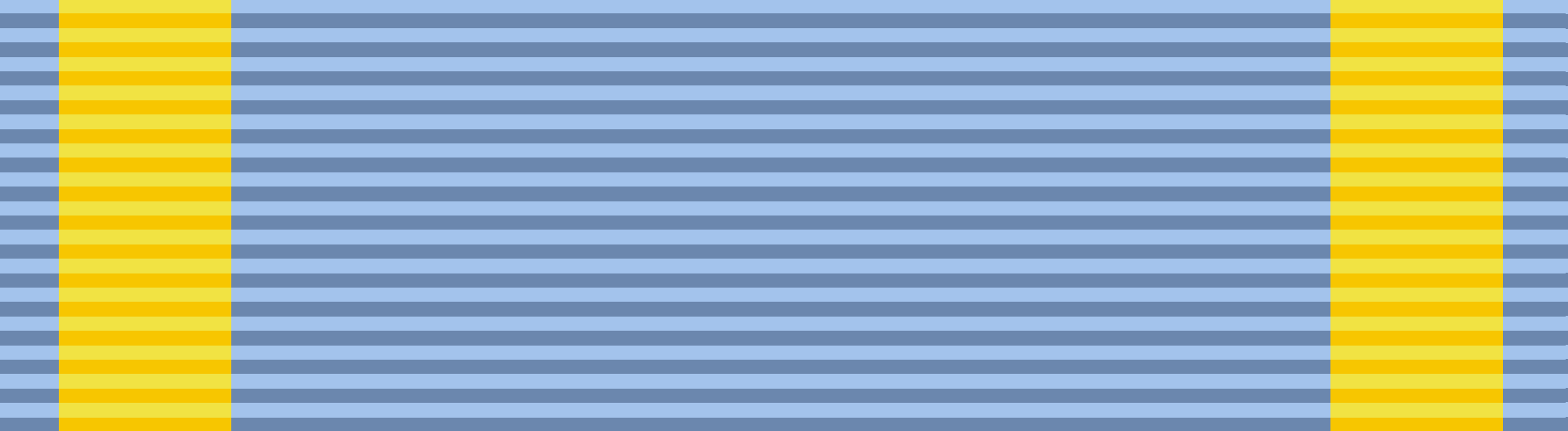
- Ribbon bar of the Order of Prince Yaroslav the Wise

The Order of Prince Yaroslav the Wise (Ukrainian: орден князя Ярослава Мудрогo, romanized: orden kniazia Yaroslava Mudroho) is a Ukrainian award. It is awarded for distinguished services to the state and people of the Ukrainian nation in the field of state building, strengthening the international prestige of Ukraine, development of economy, science, education, culture, art, health care, for outstanding charitable, humanistic and public activities. The Order is named for Yaroslav I Vladimirovich (c. 978–1054), better known as Yaroslav the Wise, a Grand Prince of Kyiv 1019–1054. It was instituted on 23 August 1995 by the Ukrainian President, Leonid Kuchma.

Since its founding in 1995, the Order has been the highest order of Ukraine for awarding citizens of Ukraine, foreigners and stateless persons; since 1998, the highest award for citizens of Ukraine is the title of Hero of Ukraine (with the award of the Order of the Golden Star or the Order of the State); for foreigners and stateless persons, the Order of Prince Yaroslav the Wise continued to be the highest order of Ukraine until the establishment of the Order of Liberty in 2008.

The insignia of the order was designed by sculptor and professor of the National Academy Of Fine Arts And Architecture Valeriy Shvetsov.

The Order is awarded in five classes and has a blue ribbon with a yellow stripe on each edge.

== History of the foundation ==
On 23 August 1995, the Decree of the president of Ukraine Leonid Kuchma No. 766/95 established the award of the President of Ukraine "Order of Prince Yaroslav the Wise" I, II, III, IV and V degree. The Decree also approved the Statute of the award and the description of the badge of the Order of the V degree; was commissioned by the Commission on State Awards of Ukraine under the president of Ukraine on a competitive basis to develop a project and description of the insignia of the Order of Prince Yaroslav the Wise I, II, III and IV degree.

On 19 June 1998, the Decree of the President of Ukraine No. 662/98 approved the description of the insignia of the President of Ukraine "Order of Prince Yaroslav the Wise" I, II, III, IV degree; it is determined that the awarding of the Order of Prince Yaroslav the Wise of the next degree is possible not earlier than 3 years after the awarding of the Order of the previous degree (in the previous Decree – in 5).

On 16 March 2000, the Verkhovna Rada of Ukraine adopted the Law of Ukraine "State Awards of Ukraine", which established the state award of Ukraine – the Order of Prince Yaroslav the Wise I, II, III, IV, V degree. It was established that the effect of this law extends to legal relations related to the awarding of persons awarded honors of the president of Ukraine before the entry into force of this Law; recommended to the president of Ukraine to bring his decrees in line with this Law.

== Statute of the Order of Prince Yaroslav the Wise ==
1. The Order of Prince Yaroslav the Wise is awarded to citizens of Ukraine, foreign citizens, stateless persons.
2. Awarding the Order of Prince Yaroslav the Wise is carried out by the Decree of the President of Ukraine.
3. The highest degree of the order is the first degree.
4. He was awarded the Order of Prince Yaroslav the Wise of any degree and is called a Knight of the Order of Prince Yaroslav the Wise.
5. The motto of the Order of Prince Yaroslav the Wise – "Wisdom, honor, glory."
6. The Order of Prince Yaroslav the Wise is awarded to citizens of Ukraine who have been awarded one of the state awards of Ukraine or honors of the President of Ukraine.
7. Awarding the Order of Yaroslav the Wise is carried out consistently, starting with the V degree. Awarding the Order of Prince Yaroslav the Wise of the next degree is possible not earlier than 3 years after the award of the Order of the previous degree.
8. Awarding the Order of Prince Yaroslav the Wise can be carried out posthumously.
9. No one has the right to deprive a knight of the Order of Prince Yaroslav the Wise of his award.
10. Foreign citizens and stateless persons are awarded:
  - Order of Prince Yaroslav the Wise of the 1st degree – the head of sovereign states;
  - Order of Prince Yaroslav the Wise of the II degree – heads of governments and parliaments of sovereign states, prominent statesmen and public figures;
  - Order of Prince Yaroslav the Wise III degree – Ministers of Foreign Affairs, heads of other foreign ministries, ambassadors of foreign states to Ukraine;
  - Order of Prince Yaroslav the Wise IV and V degree – famous scientists, artists, writers, religious figures, businessmen, human rights activists, athletes and others.
11. The Order of Prince Yaroslav the Wise of all degrees is usually awarded by the President of Ukraine.
12. The awarded Order of Prince Yaroslav the Wise is awarded a set of attributes of the award:
  - to the first degree – a badge of the Order, two stars of the Order, a shoulder award ribbon with a bow, a miniature of the badge of the Order, a diploma of awarding;
  - to the second degree – the sign of the order, the star of the order, the miniature of the sign of the order, the order book;
  - to III, IV, V degree – the sign of the order, the miniature of the sign of the order, the order book.
13. In case of loss (damage) of the attributes of the Order of Prince Yaroslav the Wise, duplicates are usually not issued.
14. Duplicates of the insignia, stars of the order, miniatures of the insignia of the Order of Prince Yaroslav the Wise and the Order Book are issued by the Commission of State Awards and Heraldry under the president of Ukraine at its discretion at the expense of the recipient or free of charge.

== Medals, star and ribbons ==
The Order of Prince Yaroslav the Wise of the I and II degree has the sign of the order and the star of the order. III, IV and V degrees – only the sign of the order.

=== Order of Prince Yaroslav the Wise I degree ===
The badge of the Order of Prince Yaroslav the Wise I degree is worn on the chain of the Order, one star of the Order – on the left side of the chest, the other – on the ribbon over the right shoulder below the bow.

The insignia of the Order of the I degree is made of silver and is an equilateral cross with rounded ends, topped with miniature crosses. The sides of the cross are covered with white and blue enamel, between them diverge curly rays. At the upper end of the sign is a bracket in the shape of a wreath of oak leaves, on which is superimposed the Old Slavic letter "U" (Ukraine) of blue enamel. In the middle of the sign there is a round enamel dark blue medallion with a gilded relief image of the profile of Prince Yaroslav the Wise. The medallion is framed by two rims, between which in a circle covered with white enamel, the inscription "Yaroslav the Wise". Rims, inscription, crosses, rays, gilded bracket. The reverse side of the sign is flat, with the engraved number of the sign and the words "Wisdom, honor, glory." The size of the sign is 60 mm.

The insignia of the Order with a bracket and two rings is attached to the chain of the Order, which is worn around the neck. The chain of medals consists of 17 medallions (four – oval with the image of the State Emblem and the State Flag of Ukraine, five – round with the image of the stylized Old Slavic letter "small yus" (the official description erroneously indicates the letter "yat"), eight – round with floral ornament), connected in a certain sequence. The medallions are connected by rings. The chain of the Order is made of gilded silver, covered with blue, blue and yellow enamel. The bar of the order is made of gilded silver.

=== Stars of the Order ===
The star of the Order of Prince Yaroslav the Wise is made of silver and has the shape of an octagonal convex star with gilded and silver diverging rays. In the middle of the star there is a round medallion and the image on a dark blue enamel background of the Old Slavic letter "small jus" (in the official description the letter "yat" is incorrectly indicated). The medallion is framed by two rims, between which on the gilding – a decorative ornament of blue and dark blue enamel. Rim, ornament, letter – gilded, embossed. On the reverse side of the star – a clasp for attaching the star to clothing (shoulder strap). The size of the star between the opposite ends: 80 mm – for wearing on the chest, 65 mm – for wearing on a bandage. Bandage ribbon – silk moire, with a bow at the thighs, 100 mm wide, blue with yellow stripes at the edges.

=== Order of Prince Yaroslav the Wise II and III degree ===
The sign of the order is the same as the sign of the order of the first degree. In the upper part of the cross, a figured ring is attached to the bracket, through which a ribbon is stretched to wear the badge of the Order on the neck.

=== Order of Prince Yaroslav the Wise IV degree ===
The sign of the order is the same as the sign of the order of the first degree, but the relief image of the profile of Prince Yaroslav the Wise is silver. In the center of the pad is a silver relief image of an oak branch. The pad frame is gilded. On the reverse side of the pad – a clasp for attaching the insignia to the clothes.

=== Order of Prince Yaroslav the Wise V degree ===
The badge of the Order is made of silver, the reverse side of the badge is flat, with the engraved number of the badge and the words "Wisdom, honor, glory".

	First Class	Second Class	Third Class	Fourth Class	Fifth Class
Badges					
Stars					
Ribbons					

== Sequence of placement of signs of state awards of Ukraine ==
- Badge of the Order of Prince Yaroslav the Wise I degree – on the chain of orders;
- the sign of the Order of Prince Yaroslav the Wise II, III degrees – on the neckband after the sign of the Order of Liberty;
- the badge of the Order of Prince Yaroslav the Wise IV, V degrees – on the left side of the chest below the badges of the Order of the Golden Star and the State of the title Hero of Ukraine and in front of other state awards;
- star of the Order of Prince Yaroslav the Wise I, II degrees – on the left side of the chest below the awards on pads (ribbons);
- star of the Order of Prince Yaroslav the Wise I degree for wearing on the shoulder strap – on the shoulder award ribbon over the right shoulder.

== Knights of the Order of Prince Yaroslav the Wise ==
The first citizens of Ukraine to be awarded the Order of Prince Yaroslav the Wise on 23 August 1995 were the well-known jurist Fyodor Burchak (Decree No. 768/95) and music stars Olga Basystyuk (Decree No. 767/95) and Anatoliy Mokrenko (Decree No. 769/95 ).

As of 1 January 2011, the Order of Prince Yaroslav the Wise I degree awarded at least 46 people, II st. – 20, III st. – 55, IV st. – 107, the largest number of persons was awarded the Order of the V degree (according to the Decrees of the president of Ukraine, listed on the official website of the Verkhovna Rada of Ukraine).

=== Full Knights of the Order of Prince Yaroslav the Wise ===
As of 16 July 2020, six people have been awarded all five degrees of the Order:

1. Metropolitan Volodymyr (Sabodan) (5th class: 1999, 4th class: 2000, 3rd class: 2002, 2nd class: 2005, 1st class: 2008)
2. Patriarch Filaret (Denysenko) (5th class: 1999, 4th class: 2002, 3rd class: 2004, 2nd class: 2006, 1st class: 2008)
3. Tatsiy Vasyl Yakovych (5th class: 1995, 4th class: 1998, 3rd class: 2009, 2nd class: 2015, 1st class: 2018)
4. Horbulin Volodymyr Pavlovych (5th class: 1997, 4th class: 2004, 3rd class: 2009, 2nd class: 2017, 1st class: 2019)
5. Smoliy Valeriy Andriyovych (5th class: 1999, 4th class: 2004, 3rd class: 2011, 2nd class: 2014, 1st class: 2019)
6. Kravchuk Leonid Makarovych (5th class: 1996, 4th class: 1999, 3rd class: 2004, 2nd class: 2007, 1st class: 2020)

=== Rewarding with skipping classes ===
The statute of the award stipulates that the awarding of the Order of Prince Yaroslav the Wise is carried out sequentially, starting with the V degree (for citizens of Ukraine; foreign citizens and stateless persons are awarded depending on the status or type of activity with the Order of the appropriate degree).

At the same time, the President of the Academy of Sciences of Ukraine Borys Paton in 2008 was awarded the highest degree of the Order of Prince Yaroslav the Wise with a pass of two degrees (II and III degree); in 2018 he was awarded the Order of the II degree. Also, only decrees on awarding orders of the I and II degrees were published as for Mykola Vasyliovych Plavyuk – President of the Ukrainian People's Republic in exile in 1988–1992.

== Notable recipients ==
- Antony Blinken, United States Secretary of State.
- Jiang Zemin, former General Secretary of the Chinese Communist Party and President of China
- Carl XVI Gustaf, King of Sweden since 1973
- Raúl Castro, the First Secretary of the Communist Party of Cuba and former President of the Council of State and Council of Ministers of Cuba
- Atamyrat Niyazov, a Red Army soldier from Soviet Turkmenistan who was the father of the first post-Soviet President of Turkmenistan Saparmurat Niyazov
- Suharto, the Second President of Indonesia from March 1968 to May 1998
- Heydar Aliyev, the third President of Azerbaijan from October 1993 to October 2003.
- Valdas Adamkus, the president of Lithuania from 1998 to 2003 and from 2004 to 2009.
- Jacques Chirac, President of France from 1995 to 2007.
- Daria Chubata, Ukrainian physician, author, social activist
- Sauli Niinistö, President of Finland from 2012 to 2024.
- Donald Tusk, President of European Council from 2014 to 2019 and Prime Minister of Poland.
- Jean-Claude Juncker, President of the European Commission from 2014 to 2019.
- Recep Tayyip Erdoğan, President of Turkey since 2014
- Vassily Ivanchuk, Ukrainian chess grandmaster.
- Iryna Melnykova, Ukrainian historian.
- Mariya Orlyk, Ukrainian teacher and politician.
- Maia Sandu, President of Moldova since 2020
- Sheikh Khalifa bin Zayed Al Nahyan, former president of the United Arab Emirates and Emir of Abu Dhabi.
- Ben Wallace, Secretary of State for Defence of the United Kingdom from 2019 to 2023.
- Andrzej Duda, President of Poland from 2015 to 2025.
- Ursula von der Leyen, President of the European commission since 2019.
- Kersti Kaljulaid, the fifth President of Estonia from 2016 to 2021.
- Masud Gharahkhani, President of the Norwegian Parliament since 2021.
- Mark Daly Senator and Cathoirleach of the Irish Seanad since 2020
- Petr Fiala, Prime Minister of the Czech Republic since 2022.
- Wopke Hoekstra, Deputy Prime Minister and Minister of Foreign Affairs of the Netherlands since 2022.
- Mateusz Morawiecki, Prime Minister of Poland from 2017 to 2023.
- Jarosław Kaczyński, Prime Minister of Poland from 2006-2007. returned award in 2026
- Kaja Kallas, Prime Minister of Estonia from 2021 to 2024.
- Hun Sen, Prime minister of Cambodia (from 1985 to 1993 and from 1998 to 2023) since 2022
- Edi Rama, Prime minister of Albania since December 2023.
- Muhammad bin Salman-Crown Prince, Prime Minister of the Kingdom of Saudi Arabia Since December 2023.
- Pedro Sánchez-Prime Minister of the Kingdom of Spain since December 2023.
- Annalena Baerbock-Federal Minister for Foreign Affairs of Germany (from 2021 to 2025) since January 2024.
- Zuzana Čaputová, President of Slovakia (from 2020 to 2024), since May 2024
- Alar Karis, President of Estonia, since August 2024.
- Ulf Kristersson, Prime Minister of Sweden, since 26 August 2024.
- Anatolii Brezvin, Ukrainian businessman, politician, and ice hockey executive
- Fumio Kishida,Prime Minister of Japan from October 2021 to September 2024
- Mark Rutte, former Prime Minister of the Kingdom of the Netherlands, Secretary General of NATO, since 27 January 2023
- Alexander Stubb, President of Finland, since 11 September 2025
- Petr Pavel, President of the Czech Republic, since 23 August 2025
