= VIM-Berkut =

Ukrainian ice hockey team

VIM-Berkut is an ice hockey team in Lviv, Ukraine. They played in Division C (the Western group) of the Ukrainian Hockey League during the 2009-10 season, finishing in sixth and last place after going winless with 5 goals for and 83 goals against.

During the 2010-11 season, the club took part in the Western Ukrainian Amateur Hockey League.
