= SDYuShOR Sokil-89 Kyiv =

- City: Kyiv, Ukraine
- League: Ukrainian Hockey Championship
- Founded: 2005

Franchise history
- 2005-2006: SdYuShOR Sokil-89 Kyiv

SDYuShOR Sokil-89 Kyiv (Ukrainian: СДЮШОР Сокіл-89 Київ) was an ice hockey team in Kyiv, Ukraine. They participated in the Ukrainian Hockey Championship during the 2005–06 season. The team was made up solely of players born in 1989 or later.

They finished with a record of 3 wins and 17 losses, with 25 goals for and 125 goals against during the 2005–06 season.
