= Iryna Melnykova =

Ukrainian historian (1918–2010)

- Ірина Миколаївна Мельникова
- Born: 24 October 1918; Mena, Sosnitsky Uyezd, Ukrainian SSR
- Died: 3 November 2010 (aged 92)
- Education: University of Kyiv
- Known for: Research on Czechoslovakia, political and economic history of Central and Eastern Europe
- Spouse: Andrii Likholat
- Awards: Honored Worker of Science and Technology of Ukraine (2002)
- Scientific career
- Fields: History, Czechoslovak studies, Central and Eastern European studies
- Workplaces: Institute of History of the Academy of Sciences of the Soviet Union (Kyiv)
- Doctoral advisor: A. Vvedensky

Notes
- Corresponding Member of the National Academy of Sciences of Ukraine

Iryna Mykolaivna Melnykova (Ukrainian: Ірина Миколаївна Мельникова; 24 October 1918 – 3 November 2010) was a Soviet and Ukrainian historian of Czechoslovakia. Doctor of Historical Sciences. Corresponding Member of the National Academy of Sciences of Ukraine. Her research interests also include the political and economic history of Central and Eastern Europe, with a particular focus on the interwar period.

== Life ==
Iryna Melnykova was born in Mena, Sosnitsky Uyezd. Melnykova graduated from the University of Kyiv (1940). With the beginning of the German-Soviet military conflict as part of World War II she was evacuated to Kazakhstan, to the city of Shymkent. She began teaching history in forced emigration at the South Kazakh Institute of Teaching (1941-1942).

She studied at the graduate school of the United Ukrainian State University in Kzyl-Orda (Tuva). In Kyiv she defended her dissertation "The Russian Government's Policy on Ukraine in 1725-1740" (supervisor A. Vvedensky) (1946), but after that she left Ukrainian studies to devote herself to bohemianism and Western Slavic studies.

She was a wife of a Ukrainian historian Andrii Likholat.

== Research ==
From 1947 to 1959 Melnykova was a senior researcher at the Institute of Slavonic Studies of the Academy of Sciences of the Soviet Union. It was there that she began to study the political history of the Czechoslovakia and Transcarpathia, which had just been annexed in favor of the USSR.

From 1957 she worked in Kyiv, at the Institute of History of the Academy of Sciences of the Soviet Union. There, in 1961, she defended her doctoral dissertation on "The class struggle in Czechoslovakia during the period of temporary partial stabilization of capitalism (1924-1929)." To this day, this work remains the most complete in the history of Czech political parties of the 1920s, which were written in Ukraine.

In 1965-1988 she was the head of the Department of Socialist History of International Relations, since 1988 - Chief Research Fellow. In 1973 she was elected a corresponding member of the Academy of Sciences of the Soviet Union (1973).

In the 1970s she was a leading scholar on the history of European countries, one of the few in the history of Czechoslovakia. She established cooperation with relevant historical institutions of the Academy of Sciences of Bulgaria, Czechoslovakia and Poland. After the restoration of Ukrainian independence, she formed an agenda for studying the history of Ukraine's international relations in modern times. In 2002 she was awarded the honorary title of "Honored Worker of Science and Technology of Ukraine".

== Awards ==
- Order of the Red Banner of Labour (1967)
- Prize named after D. Manuilsky Academy of Sciences of the Soviet Union (1976)
- Diploma of the Presidium of the Verkhovna Rada of the USSR (1976)
- Order of Friendship of Peoples (1978)
- Diploma of the Presidium of the Verkhovna Rada of the USSR (1982)
- Order of the October Revolution (1986)
- Breastplate of the Ministry of Education and Science of Ukraine "Excellence in Education of Ukraine" (1996)
- Order of Prince Yaroslav the Wise, 5th class (2008)
- Ludovit Stur Order of the Slovak Academy of Sciences

== Main works ==
- Ukraine's foreign policy in the context of globalization, 2004 (co-author)
- Ukraine and Europe (1990–2000), 2001 (co-author)
- Ukrainian-Czechoslovak international holidays, 1989 (co-author)
- Activities of friendship societies with the USSR in the countries of the socialist commonwealth, 1987 (co-author)
- Cooperation of public organizations of socialist countries, 1983 (co-author)
- For friendship with the country of Great October. Activities of friendship societies with the USSR in European socialist countries, 1977 (co-author)
- 3 histories of foreign socialist countries, 1971 (co-author)
- Foreign internationalists in the ranks of fighters for Soviet power in Ukraine, 1967 (co-author)
- Ukrainian SSR and foreign socialist countries, 1965 (co-author)
- The class struggle in Czechoslovakia in 1924–1929, 1962
- History of Czechoslovakia, 1960 (co-author).
