= Salamandra Kharkiv =

Salamandra Kharkiv was an ice hockey team in Kharkiv, Ukraine. They participated in the Ukrainian Hockey Championship during the 1993-94 and 1994-95 seasons. In 1994, they finished in third place in the first round with a record of two wins and two losses. They failed to qualify for the final round as only the top two teams from the first round advanced to it. Salamandra finished in fourth place in the first round in 1995, and again failed to qualify for the final round.
