= HC Odesa =

- City: Odesa
- League: 2009–10 Ukrainian Hockey Championship
- Founded: 2008
- Captain: (Ukraine) Dmytro Derkach

HC Odesa (Ukrainian: ХК Одеса) is an ice hockey team in Odesa, Ukraine. They played in Division B (the Southern group) of the Ukrainian Hockey League during the 2009–10 season. The club finished in second place in the group, with a record of two wins and six losses, with 26 goals for and 50 against.

They won the Black Sea Cup in 2010.
