= HC Kremenchuk =

- City: Kremenchuk, Ukraine
- League: Ukrainian Hockey League (2016-present); Ukrainian Hockey Extra League (2015–2016); Ukrainian Championship (2014–2015); Vysshaya Liga (2013–2014)
- Founded: 2010
- Operated: 2010–present
- Home arena: Aisberg Arena
- General manager: Alexander Savitsky
- Head coach: Dmitri Pidgursky
- Captain: Volodymyr Romanenko
- Website: HCKremenchuk.com.ua

Championships
- Regular season titles: 1 (2014–15)

HC Kremenchuk (Ukrainian: ХК Кременчук) is an ice hockey team based in Kremenchuk, Ukraine, playing in the Ukrainian Hockey Extra League that was formed prior to the 2016–17 season. The club was founded in 2010 and initially competed in Ukrainian amateur championships before joining the Belarusian Vysshaya Liga for 2013–14 season. After finishing the regular 2013–14 season Kremenchuk was forced to withdraw from the league prior to the playoffs due to the political situation in Ukraine. The team then joined the Ukrainian Championship for the 2014–15 season, winning the regular season and finishing as runners-up in the playoffs. Kremenchuk has also qualified for the IIHF Continental Cup on one occasion.

== History ==
HC Kremenchuk was founded in June 2010 and initially competed in Ukrainian amateur championships where they won three titles. In February 2012 the club moved into the newly built Aisberg Arena which has a seating capacity of 3100. Before the start of the 2012–13 season Kremenchuk put together a team of under-18 players to compete in the Belarusian under-18 league. HK Kremenchuk U18 finished their debut season in second place, 15 points off league winners RCOP Raubichi U18. In 2013 HK Kremenchuk joined the Belarusian Vysshaya Liga for the start of the 2013–14 season. The team finished the regular season in sixth place however in February 2014 they were forced to withdraw from the league due to the political situation in Ukraine. Their under-18 club withdrew from the Belarusian under-18 league for the same reasons.

After withdrawing from the Vysshaya Liga HK Kremenchuk was admitted to the Ukrainian Hockey Championship for the start of the 2014–15 season. The team finished the regular season in first place, 15 points ahead of the second placed Generals Kiev. Going into the playoffs HK Kremenchuk was drawn against Vityaz Kharkiv for the semifinals. Kremenchuk won the series two games to one and advanced to the finals against ATEK Kiev. They opened the three game finals series with a 4–2 win over ATEK Kiev however lost the second and third game to be defeated one to game to two. In May 2015 it was announced that HK Kremenchuk had applied to participate in the 2015–16 IIHF Continental Cup after ATEK Kiev declined the invitation. Their application was accepted and the team were scheduled to enter in the third round. HK Kremenchuk was drawn in Group E of the third round against Dragons de Rouen, GKS Tychy and Shakhtyor Soligorsk. Kremenchuk finished the round-robin Group E tournament in fourth place and failed to qualify for the super final round of the tournament. Prior to the start of the 2015–16 season Kremenchuk joined the newly formed Ukrainian Hockey Extra League which replaced the Ukrainian Hockey Championship. Kremenchuk ended the regular season in third place, and was defeated by Generals Kiev in the semifinals.

In April 2018, club junior Gleb Krivoshapkin played for the Ukraine men's national under-18 ice hockey team (2018 IIHF World U18 Championship Division I B). He scored 2 goals against the Austrians. The next game he was injured.

== Season-by-season results ==
Season	GP	W	OTW	OTL	L	GF	GA	PTS	Finish	Playoff	Ref
2013–14 Vysshaya Liga	46	25	6	2	13	177	98	89	6th	Withdrew due to political situation in Ukraine	
2014–15 Ukrainian Championship	12	9	1	1	1	52	28	30	1st	Lost final, 1–2 (ATEK Kiev)	
2015–16 Ukrainian Hockey Extra League	42	33	2	1	6	335	70	104	3rd	Lost semi-final, 2-3 (Generals Kiev)	

=== Tournaments ===
- 2015–16 IIHF Continental Cup – 4th in Group E of the Third Round. Failed to advance.

== Honours ==
=== Ukraine ===
- (Ukraine) Ukrainian Hockey Championship Regular Season
  - Winners (2): 2016–17, 2019–20
- (Ukraine) Ukrainian Hockey Championship Trophy
  - Winners (2): 2020, 2025

== Affiliated teams ==
=== HK Kremenchuk U18 ===
In 2012 HK Kremenchuk put together a team of under-18 players to compete in the Belarusian under-18 league. HK Kremenchuk U18 finished their debut season in second place, 15 points off league winners RCOP Raubichi U18. Part way through their second season the Belarusian clubs announced they would no longer travel to matches in Ukraine due to the ongoing political situation. As a result, HK Kremenchuk U18 was forced to withdraw from the league and their remaining 14 games were counted as losses. The final standings saw the team finish in eighth place with 40 points. The team is currently not active after leaving the Belarusian under-18 league.

Season by season results

Season	GP	W	OTW	OTL	L	GF	GA	PTS	Finish	Ref
2012–13 Belarusian U18	40	28	2	2	8	195	97	90	2nd	
2013–14 Belarusian U18	40	10	4	2	24	91	82	40	8th	

== See also ==
- Ukraine men's national junior ice hockey team
