= 2010–11 Ukrainian Hockey Championship =

- League: Ukrainian Championship
- Sport: Ice hockey
- Duration: 2010–11
- Teams: 7

Regular season
- Regular season winners: HC Donbass
- Runners-up: Sokil Kyiv

Playoffs
- Finals champions: HC Donbass
- Runners-up: Sokil Kyiv

Ukrainian Hockey Championship seasons
- ← 2009–10 2011–12 →

The 2010–11 or XIX Ukrainian Hockey Championship was the 19th annual edition of the Ukrainian Hockey Championship. It took place from 2010 to 2012.

== Regular season ==
=== Division A ===
	Club	GP	W	OTW	OTL	L	GF:GA	Pts
1.	HC Donbass	24	22	1	0	1	179:32	68
2.	Sokil Kyiv	24	16	0	3	5	122:65	51
3.	HC Kompanion	24	15	0	0	9	88:68	45
4.	HC Kharkiv	24	14	1	0	9	121:89	44
5.	Bilyi Bars	24	6	1	0	17	65:137	20
6.	HC Podil	24	6	0	0	18	61:72	18
7.	Vorony Sumy	24	2	0	0	22	33:206	6

== Playoffs ==
=== Quarterfinals ===
- Bilyi Bars - HC Kharkiv 1:2
- Vorony Sumy - HC Kompanion 0:2

=== Semifinals ===
- HC Kharkiv - HC Donbass 0:2
- HC Kompanion - Sokil Kyiv 1:2

=== 3rd place ===
- HC Kharkiv - HC Kompanion 1:2

=== Final ===
- Sokil Kyiv - HC Donbass 0:2
