= Holoby =

Rural locality in Volyn Oblast, Ukraine

Holoby Голоби
- Rural settlement
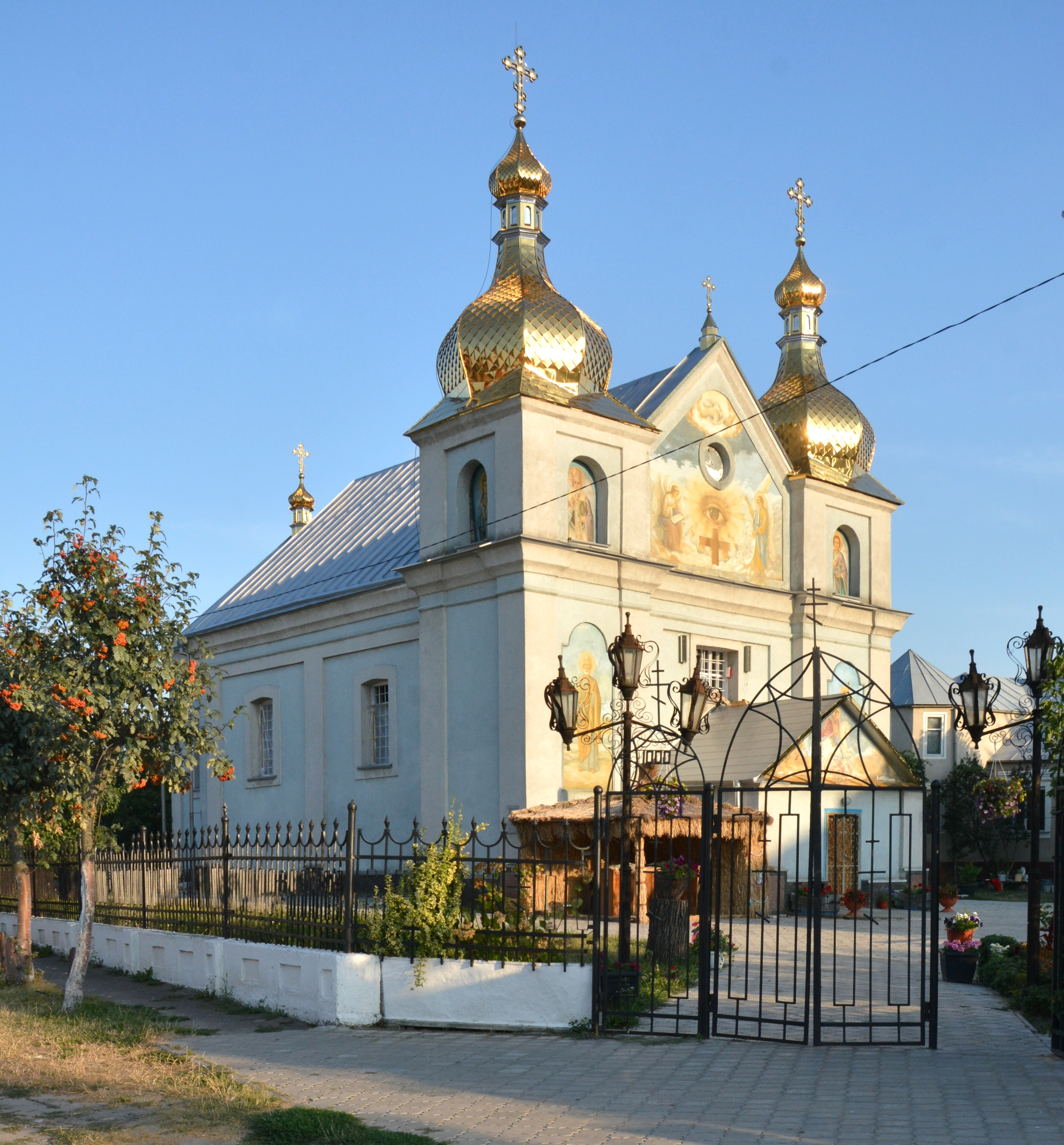
- Church of Saint George

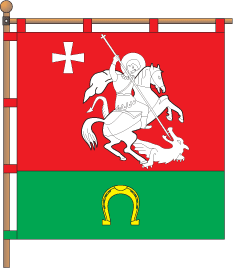
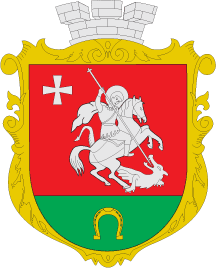
- Flag Coat of arms

- Location in Volyn Oblast Location in Ukraine
- Coordinates: 51°05′03″N 25°00′55″E
- Country: Ukraine
- Oblast: Volyn Oblast
- Raion: Kovel Raion
- Hromada: Holoby settlement hromada

Population (2024)
  - Total: ▼3,792
- Time zone: UTC+2 (EET)
  - Summer (DST): UTC+3 (EEST)

Holoby (Ukrainian: Голоби; Polish: Hołoby) is a rural settlement in Kovel Raion, Volyn Oblast, north-western Ukraine. It is located in the center of the oblast, approximately 30 kilometres (19 mi) southeast of the city of Kovel. Population: 3,871 (2022 estimate).

== Economy ==
=== Transportation ===
Holoby railway station is on a railway connecting Rivne and Kovel. There is intensive passenger traffic.

The settlement to Highway M19 connecting Chernivtsi via Ternopil and Lutsk with Kovel.

== History ==
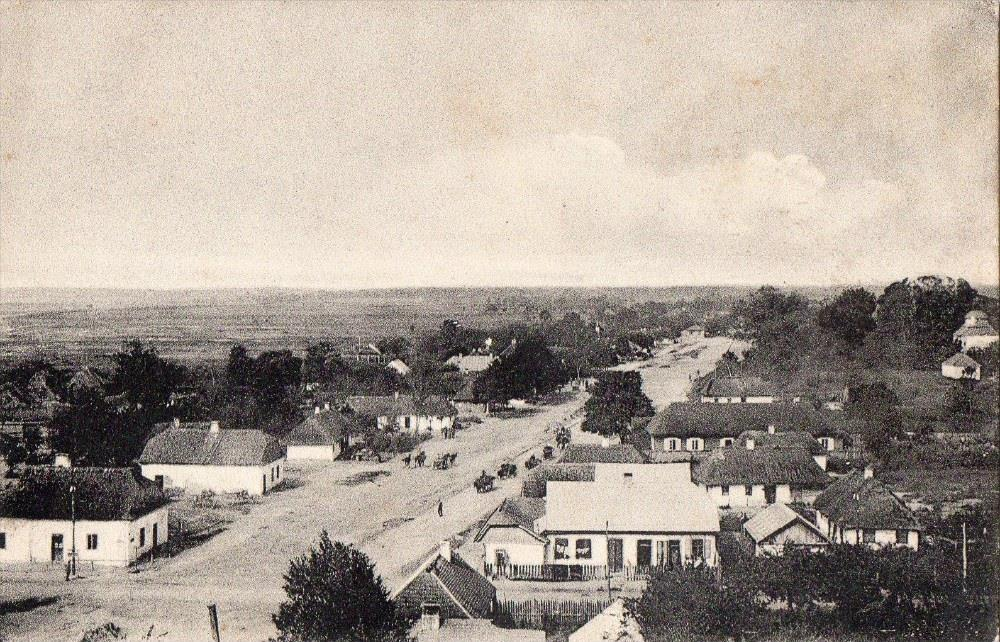
Hołoby in 1916

In the interwar period, it was the seat of a gmina, administratively located in the Kowel County in the Wołyń Voivodeship of Poland.

=== World War II ===
Following the joint German-Soviet invasion of Poland, which started World War II in September 1939, it was initially occupied by the Soviet Union, then by Nazi Germany from 1941, and then once again by the Soviets from 1944, and eventually annexed from Poland in 1945.

Between 1941 and 1944, Jewish life in Holoby and the surrounding villages was eradicated by the German occupiers and the local auxiliary police under their command.

On 29 June 1941, Nazi troops occupied these areas and began the brutal murder of the Jewish population. In spring or summer 1942, a ghetto was created in Holoby, which further worsened the situation of the Jews.

At the end of August 1942, a ghetto was formed in Melnytsia, and the Jews of Holoby were ordered to gather in the main square near the synagogue. After hearing about this order, some of the Jews fled to the forest or hid with peasants they knew. Those who turned up were assembled at the fire station and at Holoby prison and later escorted to the Melnytsia ghetto. Probably on 3 September 1942, 1,200 to 1,500 Jews were taken to a sand quarry near Melnytsia and killed. These terrible events affected the Jews of Melnytsia, Holoby and about 30 Jews from Ratne who worked nearby on the construction of the Łuck-Kowel road. Jews who fled from the Holoby ghetto and managed to escape the first murder “Aktion”, gradually returned to the town. Probably on 24 November 1942, all of them – about 250 people – were shot at this site. About 94 Jews are known to have survived the German occupation in Holoby rayon.

=== Recent period ===
Until 26 January 2024, Holoby was designated urban-type settlement. On this day, a new law entered into force which abolished this status, and Holoby became a rural settlement.

== Notable people ==
- Anatolii Brezvin, Ukrainian businessman, politician, and ice hockey executive
