= Anatoli Khorozov =

Ukrainian ice hockey administrator (1925–2011)

- Born: 25 June 1925; Korsun-Shevchenkivskyi, Ukrainian Soviet Socialist Republic
- Died: 27 September 2011 (aged 86); Kyiv, Ukraine
- Education: Odessa Higher Engineering Marine School
- Occupation: Hotel manager
- Known for: Ice Hockey Federation of Ukraine
- Awards: Order of the Patriotic War; IIHF Hall of Fame

Anatoli Nikolaevich Khorozov (Ukrainian: Анатолій Миколайович Хорозов; 25 June 1925 – 27 September 2011) was a Ukrainian ice hockey administrator and businessman. He served as president of the Ice Hockey Federation of Ukraine from 1965 to 1997. He also served in the Eastern Front of World War II and was a hotel manager. He received the Order of the Patriotic War, is credited with building ice hockey infrastructure and programs, and is referred to as the father of ice hockey in Ukraine. His career in hockey was recognized with induction into the IIHF Hall of Fame in 2006.

== Early life ==
Khorozov was born on 25 June 1925, in Korsun-Shevchenkivskyi, Ukrainian Soviet Socialist Republic. He graduated from the Odessa Higher Engineering Marine School in an electromechanics program. He participated in the Eastern Front of World War II, and was awarded the Order of the Patriotic War of the first degree.

== Hockey career ==
Khorozov served as president of the Ice Hockey Federation of Ukraine, and its forerunner federation from 1965 to 1997. He became involved in ice hockey by organizing a team at his son's school. He was introduced to Dmitry Boginov in 1963, who was the first coach of the new Dynamo Sports Club hockey team, which later became Sokil Kyiv. Boginov invited Khorozov into the national hockey workings, and Khorozov became president of the federation in 1965.

Khorozov focused on creating schools across Ukraine to teach hockey, and recruited reputable coaches to develop skills. He secured funding from the State Committee for Construction in the 1970s and led the construction of ice hockey rinks for youths. He also negotiated support from the trade unions in Ukraine to sponsor teams at all ages to play in the new rinks. He was aided by political friends including Vitaliy Masol and Vitold Fokin, and fought to increase wages for successful players, and aimed to reduced their housing costs. Players referred to Khorozov as a "public president" in the sense that he was approachable by all, and wanted to include and encourage everyone.

Khorozov championed the cause of youth being healthy both physically and spiritually. He brought in strong competition for teams in Ukraine by using his contacts in Russia. By the middle 1980s, local-grown talent began to mature, and play on Sokil Kyiv and the Soviet Union national ice hockey team. By 1985, Sokil Kyiv won the bronze medal in the Soviet Championship League, and became one of the more popular teams in the Soviet Union. This success led Khorozov to assist in the development of sports tourism, and the Olympic training center in Koncha-Zaspa.

Khorozov was succeeded as president of the Ice Hockey Federation of Ukraine by Oleksandr Omelchenko. In a 2006 interview, Khorozov said that choosing Omelchenko as his successor was a mistake, since state funding for hockey was ended, and its development structure was abandoned.

Ice hockey in Ukraine

"After perestroika, ice hockey survived only because of the efforts of Anatoli Khorozov."

— Vladislav Tretiak, 2006.

== Personal life ==
Khorozov was seriously injured during the war, but later played football, tennis, and enjoyed water skiing. Despite his work in promoting ice hockey, he never played the sport, and was a hotel manager in his professional career. He died on 27 September 2011, in Kyiv, Ukraine.

== Honors ==
Khorozov was inducted into the IIHF Hall of Fame as a builder in 2006. The announcement was made during the 2006 Men's World Ice Hockey Championships in Riga, and on 11 May 2006, he became the first Ukrainian in the IIHF Hall of Fame, and as of 2019 is the only representative from his country. Khorozov is referred to as the father of ice hockey in Ukraine, and was made an honorary president of the Ukrainian Ice Hockey Federation.
