= 2016–17 Ukrainian Hockey League season =

- League: Ukrainian Hockey Championship
- Sport: Ice hockey
- Number of teams: 6

Regular season
- Regular season winners: HK Kremenchuk

Playoffs

Finals
- Champions: HC Donbass
- Runners-up: HK Kremenchuk

Ukrainian Hockey League seasons
- ← 2015–16 (Extra League) 2017–18 →

The 2016–17 Ukrainian Hockey League season was the 25th season of the Ukrainian Hockey Championship. Six teams participated in the league this season, and HC Donbass won the championship.

== Regular season ==
Pos	Team	Pld	W	OTW	OTL	L	GF	GA	GD	Pts	Final Result
1	HK Kremenchuk	40	32	0	3	5	195	67	+128	99	Advance to Playoffs
2	HC Donbass	40	32	1	1	6	213	59	+154	99	Advance to Playoffs
3	HK Kryvbas	40	21	5	0	14	141	97	+44	73	Advance to Playoffs
4	Generals Kiev	40	13	2	4	21	102	152	−50	47	Advance to Playoffs
5	Bilyi Bars	40	8	2	1	29	96	192	−96	29	
6	Vityaz Kharkiv	40	3	1	2	34	80	260	−180	13	

Source: UHL

== Play-off ==
Semifinals
1	HK Kremenchuk	4
4	Generals Kiev	0
2	HC Donbass	4
3	HK Kryvbas	1

Final
1	HK Kremenchuk	2
2	HC Donbass	4
