= Patriot Vinnytsia =

Patriot Vinnytsia is an ice hockey team in Vinnytsia, Ukraine. They played in the Ukrainian Hockey League during the 2008-09 season, finishing third in the West Division with a record of 3 wins and 11 losses, with 72 goals for and 139 goals against.
