= 2014–15 Ukrainian Hockey Championship =

- League: Ukrainian Hockey Championship
- Sport: Ice hockey
- Duration: 12 February 2015 - 4 April 2015
- Number of teams: 4

Regular season
- Regular season winners: HK Kremenchuk

Playoffs
- Finals champions: HK ATEK Kyiv
- Runners-up: HK Kremenchuk

UHC/PHL seasons
- ← 2013–14 2015–16 →

The 2014–15 Ukrainian Hockey Championship was the 23rd season of the Ukrainian Hockey Championship. Only four teams participated in the league this season, because of the instability in Ukraine and that most of the clubs had economic issues. Generals Kiev was the only team that participated in the league the previous season, and the season started first after the year-end of 2014. The regular season included just 12 rounds, where all the teams went to the semifinals. In the final, HK ATEK Kyiv defeated the regular season winner HK Kremenchuk.

== Regular season ==
R		GP	W	OTW	OTL	L	GF	GA	Pts
1	HK Kremenchuk	12	9	1	1	1	52	28	30
2	Generals Kiev	12	5	0	0	7	41	47	15
3	HK ATEK Kyiv	12	4	1	0	7	49	55	14
4	HK Vityaz Kharkiv	12	4	0	1	7	42	54	13

== Play-off ==
Semifinals
1	HK Kremenchuk	2
4	Vityaz Kharkiv	1
2	Generals Kiev	0
3	HK ATEK Kyiv	2

Final
1	HK Kremenchuk	1
2	HK ATEK Kyiv	2
