= 2015–16 Ukrainian Hockey Extra League season =

- League: Ukrainian Hockey Extra League
- Sport: Ice hockey
- Duration: September 25, 2015 - March 31, 2016
- Number of teams: 8

Regular season
- Regular season winners: HK Donbass

Playoffs
- Finals champions: HK Donbass
- Runners-up: Generals Kiev

UHC/PHL seasons
- ← 2014–15 2016–17 →

The 2015–16 Ukrainian Hockey Extra League season was the 24th season of the Ukrainian Hockey Championship, and the first since the league was named Ukrainian Hockey Extra League. Eight teams participated in the league this season, but it was long uncertain which teams that would participate because of the instability in Ukraine and that some of the clubs have economic issues. HK Donbass won both the regular season and the playoffs.

== Regular season ==
Below is the regular season table.

		GP	W	OTW	OTL	L	GF	GA	Pts
1	HK Donbass	42	36	2	1	3	461	44	113
2	Generals Kiev	42	34	1	2	5	348	53	106
3	HK Kremenchuk	42	33	2	1	6	335	70	104
4	Vitjaz Kharkiv	42	21	1	1	18	220	148	66
5	Bilyi Bars	42	19	0	1	22	150	214	58
6	HK Rapid	42	7	1	1	33	89	385	24
7	HK Kryzhynka Kompanion	42	5	2	2	33	51	359	21
8	Yunost Kharkiv	42	2	2	2	36	78	459	12

== Play-off ==
Play-off schedule and results are shown below.

Semifinals
1	HC Donbass	3
4	Vitjaz Kharkiv	0
2	Generals Kiev	3
3	HK Kremenchuk	2

Final
1	HC Donbass	4
2	Generals Kiev	0
