= Vatra Ivano-Frankivsk =

Vatra Ivano-Frankivsk is an ice hockey team in Ivano-Frankivsk, Ukraine. The club was founded in 2007.

They played in the Western Division (also known as Division C in 2009-10) of the Ukrainian Hockey League during the 2008-09 and 2009-10 seasons. They finished first in the Western Division and made it to the second round of the playoffs in 2009. They again finished first in their group in 2010, but this time lost in the first round of the playoffs to HC Donbass.
