= Legion Simferopol =

Ukrainian ice hockey team

Legion Simferopol is an ice hockey team in Simferopol, Ukraine. The club was founded in 2008, and played in Division B (South) of the Vyscha Liha during the 2009-10 season. They finished in third and last place in the group, with a record of two wins and six losses, with 37 goals for and 63 against.
