= SDYuSShOR-Misto Kharkiv =

Ukrainian international youth ice-hockey team

- Nickname: "Kharkiv City"
- City: Kharkiv
- Founded: 2008
- Head coach: (Ukraine) Oleksandr Kobykov

Franchise history
- SDYuSShOR-Misto Kharkiv 2008-Present

SDYuSShOR-Misto Kharkiv (Ukrainian: СДЮСШОР-Місто Харків; tr. Spetsializovana Dytyache-Yunats'ka Sportyvna Shkola Olimpiys'kogo Rezervu; English: Kharkiv City Olympic Reserve Specialized Child-Youth School) are an ice hockey team based in Kharkiv, Ukraine.

== History ==
SDYuSShOR logo 2001-08

SDYuSShOR-Misto Kharkiv was founded in 2008 upon the merger of two teams: the Kharkiv hockey school SDYuSShOR-92, and the top regional amateur club Misto Kharkiv. The merger was designed so as to amplify the development of the Olympic Reserve team's youth with the injection of the better skilled Misto players.

In May 2008, the two teams were finalists in the annual Open Championship of Kharkiv hockey tournament, with Misto eventually sweeping the two-legged match finals. In the following Dnipro Cup (Tradepoint Cup-7), Misto finished 2nd, losing in the finals to Russian Major League team HC Belgorod. This achievement made Misto the de facto top amateur club in Ukraine, and by virtue of the unification of the Ukrainian League divisions, the informal champion of the First League.
