= Ukrainian Federation Cup (ice hockey) =

Ice Hockey Cup Competition

The Federation Cup was an ice hockey cup competition in Ukraine that was contested in 2008 and 2010. It was won by Bilyi Bars Brovary in 2008 and Sokil Kyiv in 2010.

== Champions ==
- 2008: Bilyi Bars Brovary
- 2010: Sokil Kyiv
