= Order of Merit (Ukraine) =

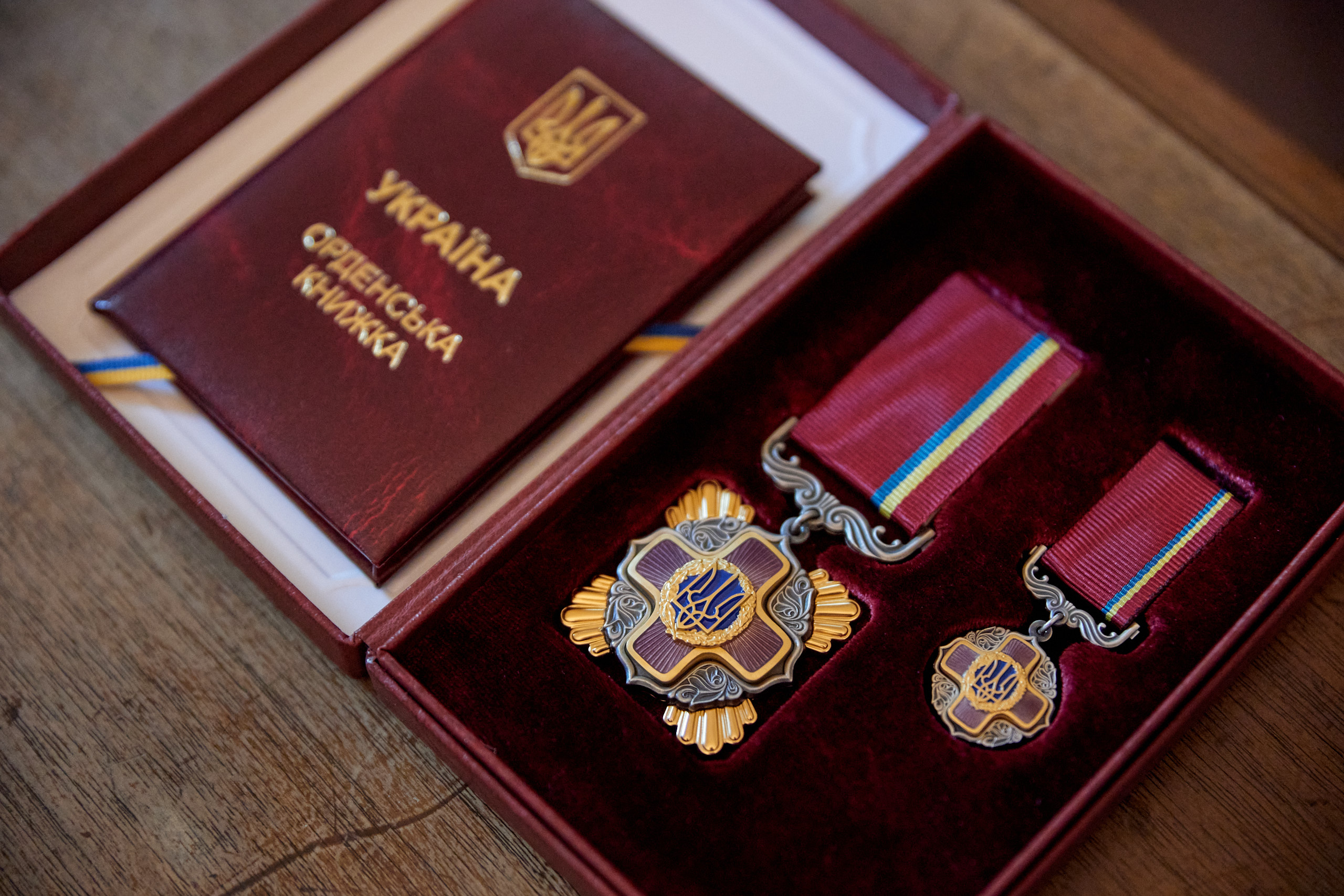
- За заслуги Україна. (Ukrainian) (For achievements Ukraine)
- Type: 3 grade order of merit
- Awarded for: given to citizens for outstanding achievements in economics, science, culture, military or political spheres of activity
- Presented by: Ukraine
- Eligibility: any individual
- Status: issued
- Established: September 22, 1996
- First award: October 12, 1996 (3rd Class)
- Ribbon of the Order of Merit

Precedence
- Next (higher): Order of Europe
- Next (lower): Order of Bohdan Khmelnytsky

The Order of Merit (Ukrainian: Орден «За заслуги») is the Ukrainian order of merit, given to individuals for outstanding achievements in economics, science, culture, military or political spheres of activity. It was first established by Ukrainian president Leonid Kuchma on September 22, 1996.

There are 3 grades, the highest being the first grade honours. Those who are awarded the Order of Merit have the official title Chevalier of the Order of Merit.

The order is granted by the president of Ukraine. It can also be granted posthumously.

== The Honorary Award of the President of Ukraine ==
The Order of Merit originates from the Honorary Award of the President of Ukraine, the first decoration of independent Ukraine. The Honorary Award was instituted by Ukrainian president Leonid Kravchuk on August 18, 1992. On September 22, 1996, it was transformed into three classes of the Order of Merit. Recipients of the Honorary Award of the President of Ukraine are considered to be equal to the recipients of the Order of Merit and they are recognised as holders of the Order of Merit 3rd Class retaining the right to wear decorations that have been granted. Granting the Honorary Award of the President of Ukraine was discontinued following the institution of the Order of Merit.

the Honorary Award of the President of Ukraine
(1992—1996)
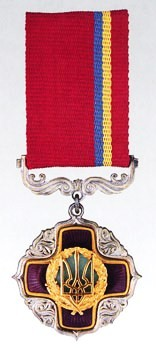
Ribbon

== Medals, star and ribbons of the Order of Merit ==
Awards to serving members of the armed forces bear crossed swords.

First Class	Second Class	Third Class
Ribbon
