= Ukrainian Cup (ice hockey) =

Ice hockey competition in Ukraine

The Ukrainian Cup was the national ice hockey cup competition in Ukraine. It was only held in 2007, and was won by HC Sokil Kyiv.

== 2007 tournament ==
Six teams participated in the competition. They were divided into two groups, with the top team in each group qualifying for the final.

=== First round ===
==== Group A ====
	Club	GP	W	OTW	T	OTL	L	GF:GA	Pts
1.	HC Sokil Kyiv	2	2	0	0	0	0	27:3	6
2.	HK ATEK Kiev	2	1	0	0	0	1	11:12	3
3.	Donbass Donetsk	2	0	0	0	0	2	5:28	0

==== Group B ====
	Club	GP	W	OTW	T	OTL	L	GF:GA	Pts
1.	HC Berkut	2	1	1	0	0	0	26:8	5
2.	HK Kompanion Kiev	2	1	0	0	1	0	17:5	4
3.	HK Lviv	2	0	0	0	0	2	6:36	0

=== Final ===
- HC Berkut - HC Sokil Kyiv 3:7 (1:4, 0:2, 2:1)
