= HC Kharkiv =

- City: Kharkiv
- League: Ukrainian Hockey League
- Founded: 2007
- Folded: 2011
- Home arena: SDUShOR Ice Rink
- Colours: White, Yellow

HC Kharkiv was an ice hockey team based in Kharkiv, Ukraine. They participated in Division-A of the former semi-professional Ukrainian Major League. They dissolved in 2011.
