= HC Generals Kyiv =

- City: Kyiv
- League: Ukrainian Hockey League
- Founded: 2011
- Folded: 2017
- Home arena: Kyiv Sports Palace
- General manager: (Ukraine) Anatolij Davydov
- Head coach: (Ukraine) Vadim Shakhraitjuk
- Website: www.hc-generals.com

The HC Generals Kyiv (Ukrainian: XK Дженералз Київ) was a Ukrainian ice hockey club from Kyiv, participant of the Ukrainian Hockey League.

== History ==
The club was founded in 2011 and folded in 2017. They were playing in the Ukrainian championship the 2013–14 season, finishing on the fifth place and missing the playoffs.

In the 2014–15 season, the team finished on the second place during the regular season. In the playoffs, they were losing in two straight games in the semi-final towards ATEK Kyiv.

In the 2015–16 season, the team finished on the second place during the regular season. In the playoffs, they were winning in the semi-final over HK Kremenchuk (3-2 in games). In the final, they were beaten by HC Donbass in four straight games.
