= Western Ukrainian Amateur Hockey League =

- Formerly: Ukrainian Major League
- Sport: Ice hockey
- Founded: 2011
- No. of teams: 10
- Country: Ukraine

The Western Ukrainian Amateur Hockey League (ZUHL) (Ukrainian: Західно Українська аматорська хокейна ліга (ЗУХЛ), Zakhidno Ukrayinska amatorska khokeina liha) is an ice hockey league in Ukraine. Following the XVIII Ukrainian Championship in 2010, Division C (formerly the Western Division) was removed from the national championships. With the transfer of the Championship to the Professional Hockey League (PHL) in 2011, these teams became incorporated into the ZUHL on a permanent basis.

== Teams ==
Team	City/Area	Founded	Joined
HC Yavir	Yavoriv		
HC Kalush	Kalush		
HC Chervonohrad	Chervonohrad		
HC Express	Lviv		
HC Favoryt	Rivne		
HC Lviv	Lviv		
HC Vedmedi	Uzhhorod		
HC Enei	Drohobych		
HC Liubart	Lutsk		
VIM-Berkut	Lviv		
