= Vorony Sumy =

- City: Sumy, Ukraine
- League: Ukrainian Hockey League
- Founded: 2002

Vorony Sumy (Ukrainian: Ворони Суми) is a semi-professional ice hockey team in Sumy, Ukraine. The club was founded in 2002 as Sums’ki Vorony Sumy, and played in the Ukrainian Hockey League in the 2010/2011 season.
