= Ekspres Lviv =

- City: Lviv
- League: ZUHL
- Division: Western
- General manager: (Ukraine) Volodymyr Cherneha
- Head coach: (Ukraine) Mykhaylo Chykantsev
- Captain: (Ukraine) Oleg Srebrykov
- Website: HCExpress.Lviv.ua

Franchise history
- Ekspres Lviv

Hockey Club Express (Ukrainian: Експрес, Ekspres) are an ice hockey team based in Lviv, Ukraine. They are currently playing in the Western Ukrainian Amateur Hockey League.
