= Ukrainian Hockey Extra League =

- Sport: Ice hockey
- Founded: 2015
- First season: 2015–16
- Folded: 2016
- No. of teams: 8
- Country: Ukraine
- Continent: Europe
- Last champion: HC Donbass
- Most titles: HC Donbass (1)
- Website: www.hel.net.ua

The Ukrainian Hockey Extra League was the name of the highest ice hockey league in Ukraine during the 2015–16 season, playing for the Ukrainian Hockey Championship. After only one season, the league was disbanded.

== Seasons ==
- 2015–16 (winner: HC Donbass)
