= Ukrainian Hockey League =

Ice hockey league in Ukraine

- Sport: Ice hockey
- Founded: 2016
- First season: 2016–17
- Folded: 2021
- No. of teams: 8
- Country: Ukraine
- Continent: Europe
- Last champion: HC Donbass (2020–21)
- Most titles: HC Donbass (4)
- Website: uhl.com.ua

The Ukrainian Hockey League was the name of the highest ice hockey league in Ukraine since the 2016–17 season, playing for the Ukrainian Hockey Championship. The league was created in June 2016 and folded in 2021.

== Seasons ==
- 2016–17 (winner: Donbas)
- 2017–18 (winner: Donbas)
- 2018–19 (winner: Donbas)
- 2019–20 (winner: Kremenchuk)
- 2020–21 (winner: Donbas)

== Teams ==
Location of teams in 2020–21 Ukrainian Hockey League

Team	Home city	Founded	Arena	Capacity
Bilyi Bars	Bila Tserkva	2008	Ice Arena Bila Tserkva	500
Dnipro Kherson	Kherson	2018	Favorite Arena	400
Donbas	Druzhkivka	2005	Altair Arena	400
Kramatorsk	Kramatorsk	2020	KOVZANKA named after S. Petrov	430
Kremenchuk	Kremenchuk	2010	Aisberg Arena	300
Kryzhani Vovky	Brovary	2017	Ice Arena Terminal	1,500
Mariupol	Mariupol	2020	Mariupol Ice Center	300
Sokil Kyiv	Kyiv	1963 (reestablished in 2020)	ATEK	500

== See also ==
- Professional Hockey League
- Ukrainian Hockey Extra League
