= List of Olympic men's ice hockey players for Ukraine =

Men's ice hockey tournaments have been staged at the Olympic Games since 1920. The men's tournament was introduced at the 1920 Summer Olympics, and permanently added to the Winter Olympic Games in 1924. Ukraine has participated in one tournament, the 2002 Winter Olympics, sending 3 goaltenders and 20 skaters. They played three preliminary-round games and one classification game, finishing tenth of the fourteen nations competing. Prior to 1991, Ukraine participated as a member of the Soviet Union, competing in every Winter Olympics from 1952 until 1992 (the country competed as part of the Unified Team in 1992).

Four players – Igor Chybirev, Valentyn Oletsky, Dmytro Khristich, and Vadym Shakhraychuk – tied for the most goals, two, while Roman Salnikov had the most assists, three. Chybirev, Oletsky, and Salnikov had the most points, three.

== Goaltenders ==
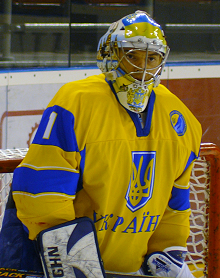
Kostyantyn Simchuk appeared in three games for Ukraine.

Abbreviation	Definition	Abbreviation	Definition
W	Wins	Min	Minutes played
L	Losses	SO	Shutouts
T	Ties	GA	Goals against
		GAA	Goals against average

Goaltenders
Player	GP	W	L	T	Min	SO	GA	GAA	Ref(s)
Oleksandr Fedorov	0	—N/a	—N/a	—N/a	—N/a	—N/a	—N/a	—N/a	
Igor Karpenko	3	1	1	0	65	0	5	4.58	
Kostyantyn Simchuk	3	1	1	0	174	0	9	3.10	

== Skaters ==
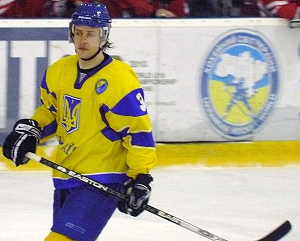
Sergii Klymentyev recorded one assist and eight penalty minutes in four games.

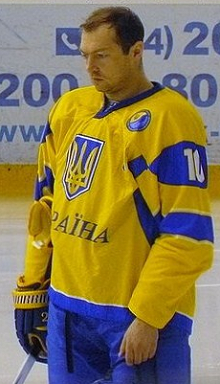
Vadym Shakhraychuk was one of four players who scored two goals.

Abbreviation	Definition	Abbreviation	Definition
G	Goals	P	Points
A	Assists	PIM	Penalty minutes

Skaters
Player	GP	G	A	P	PIM	Ref(s)
Vasyl Bobrovnikov	4	0	1	1	2	
Igor Chybirev	4	2	1	3	2	
Ruslan Fedotenko	1	1	0	1	4	
Yuriy Gunko	4	0	1	1	4	
Dmytro Khristich	2	2	0	2	0	
Sergii Klymentyev	4	0	1	1	8	
Vitaliy Lytvynenko	4	0	1	1	4	
Valentyn Oletsky	4	2	1	3	4	
Oleksiy Ponikarovsky	4	1	1	2	6	
Roman Salnikov	4	0	3	3	8	
Bogdan Savenko	4	0	1	1	2	
Vadym Shakhraychuk	4	2	0	2	4	
Valeriy Shyryaev	4	0	2	2	0	
Vladislav Sierov	4	0	1	1	0	
Vadym Slivchenko	4	0	0	0	0	
Andriy Sryubko	4	0	1	1	6	
Vyacheslav Timchenko	4	0	0	0	8	
Dmytro Tolkounov	4	0	0	0	4	
Sergey Varlamov	2	1	0	1	14	
Vyacheslav Zavalnyuk	4	0	0	0	4	
