= Ukraine at the 2002 Winter Olympics =

- IOC code: UKR
- NOC: National Olympic Committee of Ukraine
- Website: www.noc-ukr.org (in Ukrainian and English)

in Salt Lake City
- Competitors: 68 (46 men, 22 women) in 11 sports
- Flag bearer: Olena Petrova (biathlon)
- Medals: Gold 0 Silver 0 Bronze 0 Total 0

Winter Olympics appearances (overview)
- 1994; 1998; 2002; 2006; 2010; 2014; 2018; 2022; 2026

Other related appearances
- Czechoslovakia (1924–1936); Poland (1924–1936); Romania (1924–1936); Soviet Union (1956–1988); Unified Team (1992)

Ukraine competed at the 2002 Winter Olympics in Salt Lake City, United States.

== Alpine skiing ==
Men

Athlete	Event	Race 1	Race 2	Total	
Athlete	Event	Time	Time	Time	Rank
Mykola Skriabin	Downhill			1:47.65	49
Mykola Skriabin	Super-G			1:27.84	29
Mykola Skriabin	Giant Slalom	1:18.57	1:17.70	2:36.27	45
Mykola Skriabin	Slalom	56.76	DNF	DNF	–

Men's combined

Athlete	Downhill	Slalom		Total	
Athlete	Time	Time 1	Time 2	Total time	Rank
Mykola Skriabin	1:44.80	55.03	1:01.23	3:41.06	25

Women

Athlete	Event	Race 1	Race 2	Total	
Athlete	Event	Time	Time	Time	Rank
Yuliya Siparenko	Giant Slalom	1:25.73	1:21.89	2:47.62	43
Yuliya Siparenko	Slalom	59.63	1:00.87	2:00.50	30

== Biathlon ==
Men

Event	Athlete	Misses ^{1}	Time	Rank
10 km sprint	Roman Pryma	3	29:16.1	76
10 km sprint	Ruslan Lysenko	2	27:43.1	53
10 km sprint	Andriy Deryzemlia	1	27:11.1	38
10 km sprint	Vyacheslav Derkach	1	27:05.3	36
12.5 km pursuit ^{2}	Vyacheslav Derkach	3	36:56.8	40

Event	Athlete	Time	Misses	Adjusted time ^{3}	Rank
20 km	Oleksandr Bilanenko	55:34.4	4	59:34.4	68
20 km	Andriy Deryzemlia	54:14.8	1	55:14.8	27
20 km	Ruslan Lysenko	53:02.1	2	55:02.1	24
20 km	Vyacheslav Derkach	54:01.3	1	55:01.3	23

Men's 4 × 7.5 km relay

Athletes	Race		
Athletes	Misses ^{1}	Time	Rank
Vyacheslav Derkach; Oleksandr Bilanenko; Roman Pryma; Ruslan Lysenko	2	1'27:02.2	7

Women

Event	Athlete	Misses ^{1}	Time	Rank
7.5 km sprint	Olena Zubrilova-Ohurtsova	4	24:33.2	59
7.5 km sprint	Olena Petrova	2	23:40.9	48
7.5 km sprint	Nina Lemesh	1	23:37.4	47
7.5 km sprint	Tetiana Vodop'ianova	2	23:03.8	31
10 km pursuit ^{4}	Tetiana Vodop'ianova	4	34:23.0	26

Event	Athlete	Time	Misses	Adjusted time ^{3}	Rank
15 km	Olena Zubrilova-Ohurtsova	49:10.7	3	52:10.7	34
15 km	Oksana Khvostenko	51:34.4	0	51:34.4	29
15 km	Oksana Yakovlieva	49:22.2	2	51:22.2	27
15 km	Olena Petrova	50:05.7	1	51:05.7	24

Women's 4 × 7.5 km relay

Athletes	Race		
Athletes	Misses ^{1}	Time	Rank
Olena Zubrilova-Ohurtsova; Olena Petrova; Nina Lemesh; Tetiana Vodop'ianova	1	1'32:00.6	10

^{1} A penalty loop of 150 metres had to be skied per missed target.
^{2} Starting delay based on 10 km sprint results.
^{3} One minute added per missed target.
^{4} Starting delay based on 7.5 km sprint results.

== Bobsleigh ==
Men

Sled	Athletes	Event	Run 1		Run 2		Run 3		Run 4		Total	
Sled	Athletes	Event	Time	Rank	Time	Rank	Time	Rank	Time	Rank	Time	Rank
UKR-1	Oleksandr Ivanyshyn; Oleksandr Streltsov	Two-man	49.47	32	49.43	33	49.77	34	49.75	35	3:18.42	34

Sled	Athletes	Event	Run 1		Run 2		Run 3		Run 4		Total	
Sled	Athletes	Event	Time	Rank	Time	Rank	Time	Rank	Time	Rank	Time	Rank
UKR-1	Oleh Polyvach; Bohdan Zamostianyk; Oleksandr Ivanyshyn; Yuriy Zhuravskiy	Four-man	48.03	26	48.09	26	48.76	23	48.89	23	3:13.77	22

== Cross-country skiing ==
Men

Sprint

Athlete	Qualifying round		Quarter finals		Semi finals		Finals	
Athlete	Time	Rank	Time	Rank	Time	Rank	Time	Final rank
Roman Leybyuk	3:03.21	45	did not advance					

Pursuit

Athlete	10 km C		10 km F pursuit^{1}	
Athlete	Time	Rank	Time	Final rank
Roman Leybyuk	26:37.5	7 Q	24:16.2	11

Event	Athlete	Race	
Event	Athlete	Time	Rank
15 km C	Roman Leybyuk	39:50.9	32
30 km F	Roman Leybyuk	1'18:52.3	50
50 km C	Roman Leybyuk	2'15:50.9	22

^{1} Starting delay based on 10 km C. results.
C = Classical style, F = Freestyle

Women

Sprint

Athlete	Qualifying round		Quarter finals		Semi finals		Finals	
Athlete	Time	Rank	Time	Rank	Time	Rank	Time	Final rank
Vita Yakymchuk	3:28.94	41	did not advance					
Iryna Taranenko-Terelia	3:23.47	29	did not advance					

Pursuit

Athlete	5 km C		5 km F pursuit^{2}	
Athlete	Time	Rank	Time	Final rank
Maryna Pestriakova	14:41.0	57	did not advance	
Olena Rodina	14:37.8	56	did not advance	
Valentina Shevchenko	13:48.7	15 Q	13:13.2	21
Iryna Taranenko-Terelia	13:43.7	12 Q	12:35.4	10

Event	Athlete	Race	
Event	Athlete	Time	Rank
10 km C	Olena Rodina	31:07.4	41
10 km C	Valentina Shevchenko	29:42.7	12
10 km C	Iryna Taranenko-Terelia	29:35.8	11
15 km F	Vita Yakymchuk	45:26.7	44
15 km F	Valentina Shevchenko	42:16.0	21
15 km F	Iryna Taranenko-Terelia	40:39.4	9
30 km C	Maryna Pestriakova	DNF	–
30 km C	Olena Rodina	1'46:51.2	38
30 km C	Iryna Taranenko-Terelia	1'37:32.9	18
30 km C	Valentina Shevchenko	1'33:03.1	5

^{2} Starting delay based on 5 km C. results.
C = Classical style, F = Freestyle

== Figure skating ==
Men

Athlete	Points	SP	FS	Rank
Dmitri Dmitrenko	28.5	21	18	18

Women

Athlete	Points	SP	FS	Rank
Elena Liashenko	21.0	16	13	14
Galina Maniachenko	18.5	15	11	12

Pairs

Athletes	Points	SP	FS	Rank
Tatiana Chuvaeva; Dmitri Palamarchuk	23.5	15	16	16
Aliona Savchenko; Stanislav Morozov	22.0	16	14	15

Ice Dancing

Athletes	Points	CD1	CD2	OD	FD	Rank
Julia Golovina; Oleg Voiko	43.4	22	22	21	22	21
Elena Grushina; Ruslan Goncharov	19.0	10	10	10	9	9

== Freestyle skiing ==
Men

Athlete	Event	Qualification		Final	
Athlete	Event	Points	Rank	Points	Rank
Enver Ablaev	Aerials	156.84	22	did not advance	
Stanislav Kravchuk	Aerials	225.68	11 Q	246.30	5

Women

Athlete	Event	Qualification		Final	
Athlete	Event	Points	Rank	Points	Rank
Tetiana Kozachenko	Aerials	151.23	15	did not advance	

== Ice hockey ==
=== Men's tournament ===
==== Preliminary round - Group B ====
Top team (shaded) advanced to the first round.

Team	GP	W	L	T	GF	GA	GD	Pts
Belarus	3	2	1	0	5	3	+2	4
Ukraine	3	2	1	0	9	5	+4	4
Switzerland	3	1	1	1	7	9	−2	3
France	3	0	2	1	6	10	−4	1

All times are local (UTC-7).

9 February 2002; 14:00	Belarus	1 – 0 (0–0, 0–0, 1–0)	Ukraine	Peaks Ice Arena, Provo; Attendance: 6,294

11 February 2002; 16:00	Ukraine	5 – 2 (2–1, 2–1, 1–0)	Switzerland	E Center, West Valley City; Attendance: 8,387

12 February 2002; 19:00	France	2 – 4 (0–2, 2–2, 0–0)	Ukraine	Peaks Ice Arena, Provo; Attendance: 6,019

==== Consolation round ====
9th place match

14 February 2002; 20:00	Ukraine 10th	2 – 9 (0–6, 2–3, 0–0)	Latvia	E Center, West Valley City; Attendance: 8,449

==== Team roster ====
Contestants; Vasyl Bobrovnikov; Igor Chibirev; Ruslan Fedotenko; Yuri Gunko; Igor Karpenko; Dmitri Khristich; Serhiy Klymentiev; Vitaliy Lytvynenko; Valentyn Oletsky; Alexei Ponikarovsky; Roman Salnikov; Bogdan Savenko; Vadym Shakhraychuk; Valeri Shyriaiev; Vladyslav Serov; Kostiantyn Simchuk; Vadim Slivchenko; Andriy Sriubko; Viacheslav Tymchenko; Dmytro Tolkunov; Serhiy Varlamov; Viacheslav Zavalniuk

== Luge ==
Men's doubles

Athletes	Run 1		Run 2		Total	
Athletes	Time	Rank	Time	Rank	Time	Rank
Danylo Panchenko; Oleh Avdeev	43.727	13	43.600	12	1:27.327	11

Women

Athlete	Run 1		Run 2		Run 3		Run 4		Total	
Athlete	Time	Rank	Time	Rank	Time	Rank	Time	Rank	Time	Rank
Oryslava Chukhlib	44.274	22	43.942	17	44.060	23	44.005	21	2:56.281	20
Liliya Ludan	43.800	9	43.623	7	43.565	6	43.511	6	2:54.499	6

== Short track speed skating ==
Men

Athlete	Event	Round one		Quarter finals		Semi finals		Finals	
Athlete	Event	Time	Rank	Time	Rank	Time	Rank	Time	Final rank
Volodymyr Hryhor'iev	500 m	1:10.431	4	did not advance					
Volodymyr Hryhor'iev	1000 m	DSQ	–	did not advance					
Volodymyr Hryhor'iev	1500 m	2:25.316	5	did not advance					

== Ski jumping ==
Athlete	Event	Qualifying jump			Final jump 1			Final jump 2		Total	
Athlete	Event	Distance	Points	Rank	Distance	Points	Rank	Distance	Points	Points	Rank
Volodymyr Hlyvka	Normal hill	73.5	72.0	47	did not advance						
Volodymyr Hlyvka	Large hill	90.5	54.9	49	did not advance						

== Speed skating ==
Men

Event	Athlete	Race 1		Race 2		Total	
Event	Athlete	Time	Rank	Time	Rank	Time	Rank
500 m	Andriy Fomin	36.26	27	36.38	34	72.64	29
1000 m	Andriy Fomin					1:11.04	37
1500 m	Andriy Fomin					1:51.02	43

Women

Event	Athlete	Race	
Event	Athlete	Time	Rank
1000 m	Olena Miahkykh	1:20.13	35
1500 m	Olena Miahkykh	2:05.32	38
3000 m	Olena Miahkykh	4:24.64	31
