= Bogdan Savenko =

Ukrainian ice hockey player

- Born: 20 November 1974 (age 50); Kiev, Ukrainian SSR, Soviet Union
- Height: 6 ft 2 in (188 cm)
- Weight: 205 lb (93 kg; 14 st 9 lb)
- Position: Right wing
- Shot: Right
- National team: Ukraine
- NHL draft: 54th overall, 1993; Chicago Blackhawks
- Playing career: 1990–2011

Bogdan Volodimirovich Savenko (Ukrainian: Богдан Володимирович Савенко; born 20 November 1974), is a Ukrainian retired professional ice hockey player. He played for multiple teams during his career, though primarily with Sokil Kyiv, which lasted from 1990 until 2011. He played internationally for the Ukrainian national team at several World Championships, as well as the 2002 Winter Olympics.

== Career statistics ==
=== Regular season and playoffs ===
			Regular season					Playoffs
Season	Team	League	GP	G	A	Pts	PIM	GP	G	A	Pts	PIM
1990–91	ShVSM Kyiv	URS.3	8	2	1	3	0	—	—	—	—	—
1991–92	Sokil Kyiv	CIS	25	3	1	4	4	—	—	—	—	—
1991–92	ShVSM Kyiv	CIS.3	17	6	3	9	18	—	—	—	—	—
1992–93	Niagara Falls Thunder	OHL	51	29	19	48	15	2	1	0	1	2
1993–94	Niagara Falls Thunder	OHL	62	42	49	91	22	—	—	—	—	—
1994–95	Indianapolis Ice	IHL	62	18	17	35	49	—	—	—	—	—
1995–96	Syracuse Crunch	AHL	69	16	20	36	68	14	2	4	6	20
1996–97	Syracuse Crunch	AHL	38	7	9	16	24	—	—	—	—	—
1996–97	Québec Rafales	IHL	14	2	1	3	4	9	2	0	2	0
1997–98	Port Huron Border Cats	UHL	3	0	0	0	2	—	—	—	—	—
1997–98	Lukko	SM-l	8	1	1	2	6	—	—	—	—	—
1997–98	Sport	FIN.2	2	0	1	1	0	—	—	—	—	—
1997–98	KalPa	SM-l	18	4	2	6	34	—	—	—	—	—
1998–99	HC Opava	ELH	42	8	9	17	16	—	—	—	—	—
1999–2000	HC Femax Havířov	ELH	26	3	6	9	10	—	—	—	—	—
1999–2000	Sokil Kyiv	EEHL	15	4	6	10	6	—	—	—	—	—
2000–01	Sokil Kyiv	EEHL	11	7	4	11	12	—	—	—	—	—
2000–01	SKA St. Petersburg	RSL	4	0	1	1	0	—	—	—	—	—
2001–02	Spartak Moscow	RSL	46	2	16	18	30	—	—	—	—	—
2002–03	Sokil Kyiv	EEHL	34	7	13	20	33	—	—	—	—	—
2002–03	Sokil Kyiv	UKR	—	—	—	—	—	1	1	0	1	0
2003–04	Sokil Kyiv	EEHL	12	8	4	12	2	—	—	—	—	—
2003–04	Sokil Kyiv	UKR	—	—	—	—	—	2	3	3	6	0
2004–05	Sokil Kyiv	BLR	37	9	14	23	14	11	1	2	3	4
2004–05	Sokil Kyiv	UKR	—	—	—	—	—	2	0	0	0	0
2005–06	Sokil Kyiv	BLR	20	2	11	13	6	2	0	0	0	0
2005–06	Sokil Kyiv	UKR	—	—	—	—	—	3	1	0	1	2
2006–07	HC Berkut	UKR	28	27	28	55	32	—	—	—	—	—
2007–08	Bilyi Bars	UKR	23	14	15	29	18	2	1	1	2	2
2008–09	Bilyi Bars	UKR	16	7	16	23	14	—	—	—	—	—
2008–09	Kompanion Kyiv	UKR	15	7	14	21	10	2	0	0	0	34
2009–10	HC Berkut	UKR	15	9	14	23	8	—	—	—	—	—
2010–11	HC Podil	UKR	15	5	6	11	20	—	—	—	—	—
AHL totals			107	23	29	52	92	14	2	4	6	20
UKR totals			112	69	93	162	102	12	6	4	10	38

=== International ===
Year	Team	Event	GP	G	A	Pts	PIM
1999	Ukraine	WC Q	3	0	1	1	0
2000	Ukraine	WC	6	0	0	0	2
2001	Ukraine	OGQ	3	0	1	1	0
2001	Ukraine	WC	6	0	0	0	2
2002	Ukraine	OG	4	0	1	1	2
2002	Ukraine	WC	6	0	3	3	2
2003	Ukraine	WC	6	0	0	0	2
2005	Ukraine	WC	6	2	1	3	2
Senior totals			40	2	7	9	12
