= Vasyl Bobrovnikov =

Ukrainian ice hockey player

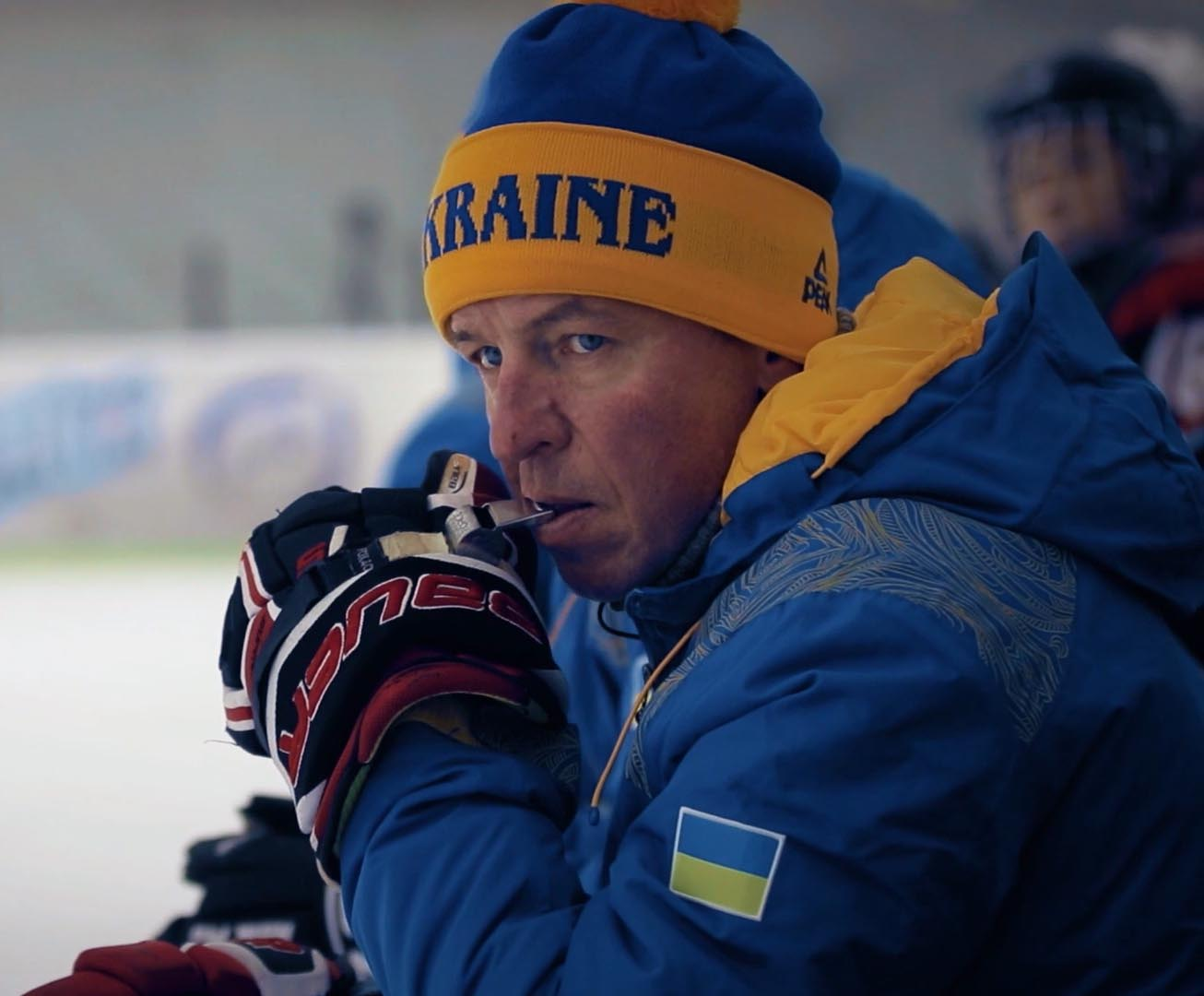
- Born: 8 November 1971 (age 54) Kyiv, Ukrainian SSR, Soviet Union
- Height: 5 ft 9 in (175 cm)
- Weight: 174 lb (79 kg; 12 st 6 lb)
- Position: Left wing
- Shot: Left
- Played for: Sokil Kyiv; ATEK Kyiv; Berkut Kyiv; Torpedo Nizhny Novgorod; ShVSM Kyiv
- National team: Ukraine
- Playing career: 1988–2008
Medal record
Men's ice hockey
Representing Ukraine
Winter Universiade
Gold medal – first place	1999 Poprad	Team

Vasyl Valentinovich Bobrovnikov (Ukrainian: Василь Валентинович Бобровников, born 8 November 1971) is a Ukrainian retired professional ice hockey player. He mainly played for Sokil Kyiv in Ukraine. He played internationally for the Ukrainian national team at several World Championships, as well as the 2002 Winter Olympics.

== Career statistics ==
=== Regular season and playoffs ===
			Regular season					Playoffs
Season	Team	League	GP	G	A	Pts	PIM	GP	G	A	Pts	PIM
1988–89	ShVSM Kyiv	URS.2	6	0	1	1	8	—	—	—	—	—
1989–90	Sokil Kyiv	URS	1	0	1	1	0	—	—	—	—	—
1989–90	ShVSM Kyiv	URS.3	50	1	1	2	24	—	—	—	—	—
1990–91	ShVSM Kyiv	URS.3	63	4	3	7	20	—	—	—	—	—
1991–92	Sokil Kyiv	CIS	27	2	1	3	8	—	—	—	—	—
1991–92	ShVSM Kyiv	CIS.3	3	0	0	0	0	—	—	—	—	—
1992–93	Sokil Kyiv	IHL	40	9	8	17	8	3	0	0	0	0
1992–93	Sokil–2 Kyiv	RUS.2	2	2	2	4	0	—	—	—	—	—
1993–94	Sokil Kyiv	IHL	42	5	7	12	12	—	—	—	—	—
1994–95	Sokil Kyiv	IHL	43	7	7	14	14	—	—	—	—	—
1995–96	Ak Bars Kazan	IHL	13	0	0	0	2	—	—	—	—	—
1995–96	Ak Bars–2 Kazan	RUS.2	6	0	1	1	2	—	—	—	—	—
1995–96	Sokil Kyiv	IHL	24	6	3	9	6	—	—	—	—	—
1996–97	Sokil Kyiv	EEHL	40	33	27	60	36	—	—	—	—	—
1997–98	Torpedo Nizhny Novgorod	RSL	14	0	1	1	10	—	—	—	—	—
1997–98	Sokil Kyiv	EEHL	9	3	4	7	0	—	—	—	—	—
1998–99	Sokil Kyiv	EEHL	41	17	21	38	8	—	—	—	—	—
1999–2000	Sokil Kyiv	EEHL	44	21	29	50	18	—	—	—	—	—
2000–01	Berkut Kyiv	EEHL	32	12	23	35	14	—	—	—	—	—
2001–02	Sokil Kyiv	EEHL	32	14	11	25	10	—	—	—	—	—
2001–02	Sokil Kyiv	UKR	12	5	11	16	14	—	—	—	—	—
2002–03	Sokil Kyiv	EEHL	36	7	15	22	26	—	—	—	—	—
2002–03	Sokil Kyiv	UKR	—	—	—	—	—	2	0	3	3	0
2003–04	Sokil Kyiv	EEHL	30	6	13	19	4	—	—	—	—	—
2003–04	Sokil Kyiv	UKR	—	—	—	—	—	2	0	1	1	0
2004–05	Sokil Kyiv	BLR	43	17	23	40	6	11	0	2	2	2
2004–05	Sokil Kyiv	UKR	—	—	—	—	—	2	1	1	2	0
2005–06	Sokil Kyiv	BLR	32	10	11	21	8	3	0	0	0	0
2005–06	Sokil Kyiv	UKR	—	—	—	—	—	3	0	0	0	—
2006–07	Sokil Kyiv	BLR	51	14	31	45	12	—	—	—	—	—
2006–07	ATEK Kyiv	UKR	—	—	—	—	—	4	0	6	6	0
2007–08	Sokil Kyiv	RUS.2	26	3	4	7	24	2	0	0	0	0
2007–08	Sokil–2 Kyiv	UKR	5	4	7	11	4	—	—	—	—	—
IHL totals			162	27	25	52	42	4	0	0	0	2
EEHL totals			264	113	143	256	116	—	—	—	—	—

=== International ===
Year	Team	Event	GP	G	A	Pts	PIM
1993	Ukraine	WC C	7	1	1	2	4
1994	Ukraine	WC C	6	0	2	2	2
1995	Ukraine	WC C	4	0	1	1	0
1996	Ukraine	WC C	7	3	1	4	4
1997	Ukraine	WC C	5	1	1	2	0
1998	Ukraine	WC B	7	2	4	6	0
1999	Ukraine	WC	3	0	0	0	0
1999	Ukraine	WC Q	3	0	0	0	0
2000	Ukraine	WC	6	1	0	1	0
2001	Ukraine	OGQ	3	0	0	0	2
2001	Ukraine	WC	6	1	1	2	0
2002	Ukraine	OG	4	0	1	1	2
2002	Ukraine	WC	5	1	0	1	0
2003	Ukraine	WC	6	1	0	1	2
2004	Ukraine	WC	6	1	2	3	0
2005	Ukraine	OGQ	3	1	0	1	2
2005	Ukraine	WC	6	0	3	3	6
2006	Ukraine	WC	6	0	2	2	0
2007	Ukraine	WC	6	0	1	1	0
Senior totals			99	13	20	33	24
