= Yuri Gunko =

Ukrainian ice hockey player

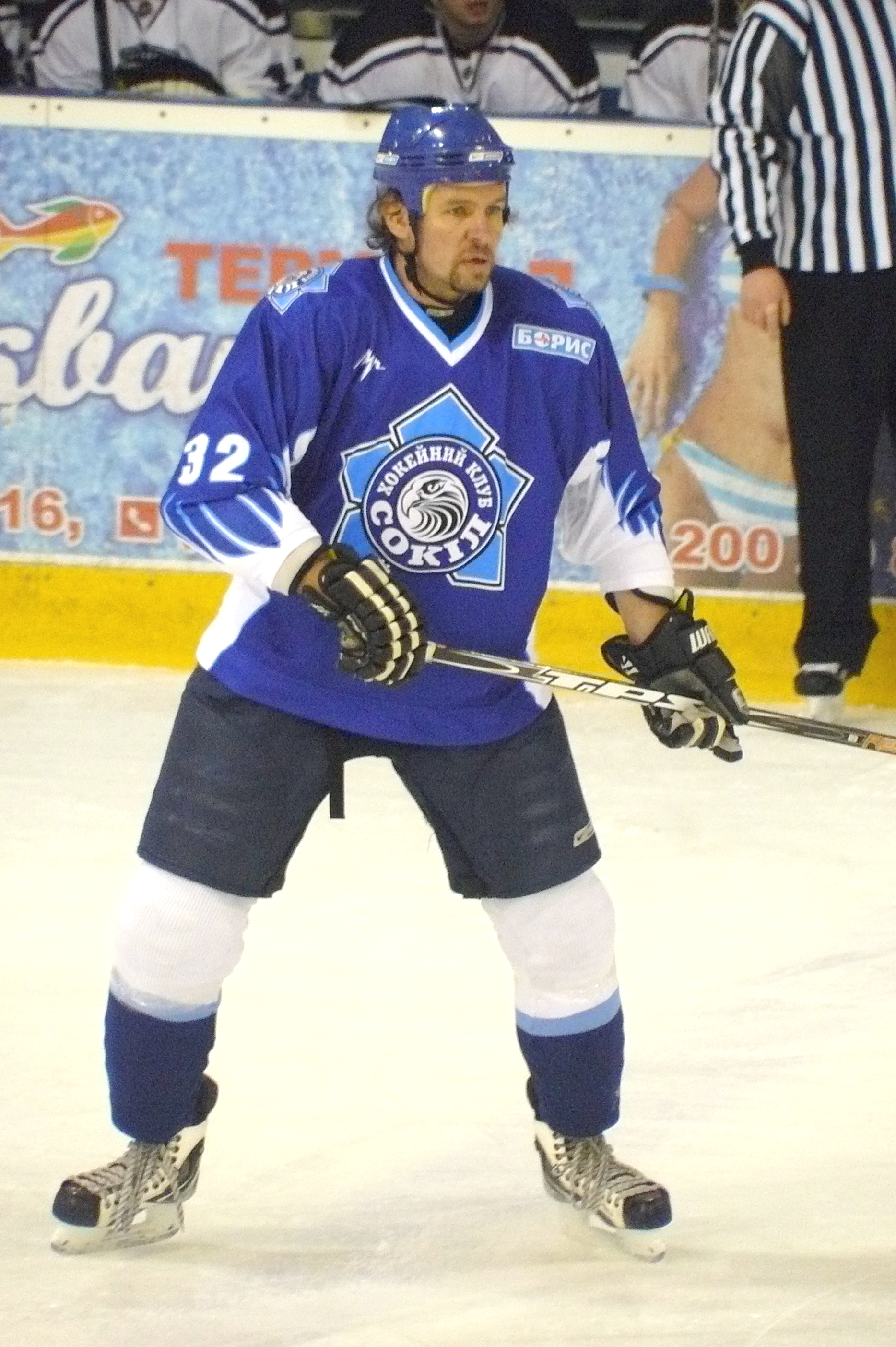
- Born: February 28, 1972 (age 54) Kyiv, Ukraine, Soviet Union
- Height: 6 ft 3 in (191 cm)
- Weight: 207 lb (94 kg; 14 st 11 lb)
- Position: Defence
- Shot: Left
- Vysshaya Liga team: Sokil Kyiv
- Played for: ShVSM Kyiv; Ak Bars Kazan; Hannover Scorpions; CSKA Moscow; HKm Zvolen; HK ATEK Kyiv
- National team: Ukraine
- NHL draft: 230th overall, 1992; St. Louis Blues
- Playing career: 1990–2011

Yuriy Dmytrovych Hunko (Ukrainian: Юрій Дмитрович Гунько, born February 28, 1972), also known as Yuri Gunko, is a former Ukrainian professional ice hockey player. He was drafted by the St. Louis Blues in the 10th round, 230th overall in the 1992 NHL entry draft.

== Career ==
Gunko began his career with ShVSM Kyiv in 1988. He stayed with SHVSM until 1990, when he joined Sokil Kyiv, and played with them until 1995. Gunko then played four seasons for Ak Bars Kazan, before a one-year stop-over in the DEL with the Hannover Scorpions, before returning to Kazan in 2000. He then played for CSKA Moscow for one season, before re-joining Sokil Kyiv for four years, from 2002-2006. After playing one year with both HKm Zvolen and HK ATEK Kyiv, he re-joined Sokil Kyiv for the third time.

== Achievements ==
- 1998 Russian champion with Ak Bars Kazan
- 2003 Ukrainian champion with Sokil Kyiv
- 2004 Ukrainian champion with Sokil Kyiv
- 2005 Ukrainian champion with Sokil Kyiv
- 2006 Ukrainian champion with Sokil Kyiv
- 2007 Ukrainian champion with HK ATEK Kyiv
- 2009 Ukrainian champion with Sokil Kyiv

=== International ===
- Silver medal at the 1990 IIHF European U18 Championship

== Career statistics ==
=== Regular season and playoffs ===
			Regular season					Playoffs
Season	Team	League	GP	G	A	Pts	PIM	GP	G	A	Pts	PIM
1988–89	ShVSM Kyiv	URS.2	9	0	0	0	2	—	—	—	—	—
1989–90	ShVSM Kyiv	URS.3	29	2	1	3	18	—	—	—	—	—
1990–91	Sokil Kyiv	URS	14	0	0	0	8	—	—	—	—	—
1990–91	ShVSM Kyiv	URS.3	25	2	3	5	26	—	—	—	—	—
1991–92	Sokil Kyiv	CIS	22	1	0	1	16	—	—	—	—	—
1991–92	ShVSM Kyiv	CIS.3	3	0	2	2	0	—	—	—	—	—
1992–93	Sokil Kyiv	IHL	40	2	3	5	28	3	0	0	0	4
1992–93	Sokil–2 Kyiv	RUS.2	2	0	0	0	2	—	—	—	—	—
1993–94	Sokil Kyiv	IHL	42	0	8	8	28	—	—	—	—	—
1994–95	Sokil Kyiv	IHL	25	4	0	4	18	—	—	—	—	—
1995–96	Ak Bars Kazan	IHL	46	1	2	3	22	5	1	0	1	4
1996–97	Ak Bars Kazan	RSL	42	6	7	13	42	3	1	0	1	4
1997–98	Ak Bars Kazan	RSL	44	6	5	11	50	2	1	0	1	4
1998–99	Ak Bars Kazan	RSL	9	0	3	3	0	—	—	—	—	—
1998–99	Ak Bars–2 Kazan	RUS.3	1	0	1	1	0	—	—	—	—	—
1999–2000	Hannover Scorpions	DEL	54	2	10	12	46	—	—	—	—	—
2000–01	Ak Bars Kazan	RSL	31	1	4	5	34	2	0	0	0	0
2001–02	CSKA Moscow	RUS.2	41	2	18	20	24	12	0	3	3	4
2002–03	Sokil Kyiv	EEHL	26	0	6	6	12	—	—	—	—	—
2002–03	Sokil Kyiv	UKR	—	—	—	—	—	2	0	0	0	0
2003–04	Sokil Kyiv	EEHL	8	1	3	4	2	—	—	—	—	—
2003–04	Sokil Kyiv	UKR	—	—	—	—	—	2	2	0	2	6
2003–04	Gazovik Tyumen	RUS.2	2	1	0	1	0	—	—	—	—	—
2004–05	Sokil Kyiv	BLR	40	2	16	18	46	9	2	2	4	12
2004–05	Sokil Kyiv	UKR	—	—	—	—	—	2	1	0	1	0
2005–06	Sokil Kyiv	BLR	52	6	14	20	95	3	0	0	0	4
2005–06	Sokil Kyiv	UKR	—	—	—	—	—	3	0	1	1	2
2006–07	HKm Zvolen	SVK	37	1	8	9	46	—	—	—	—	—
2006–07	Sokil Kyiv	BLR	8	0	3	3	10	—	—	—	—	—
2006–07	ATEK Kyiv	UKR	13	5	23	28	16	—	—	—	—	—
2007–08	Sokil Kyiv	RUS.2	56	6	17	23	58	3	1	1	2	16
2008–09	Sokil Kyiv	RUS.2	57	5	15	20	136	5	1	0	1	22
2008–09	Sokil–2 Kyiv	UKR	—	—	—	—	—	3	0	1	1	0
2009–10	Sokil Kyiv	BLR	30	2	11	13	40	8	0	1	1	29
2010–11	Sokil Kyiv	BLR	6	0	4	4	22	—	—	—	—	—
2010–11	Sokil–2 Kyiv	UKR	8	0	5	5	10	—	—	—	—	—
IHL totals			153	7	13	20	96	8	1	0	1	8
RSL totals			126	13	19	32	126	7	2	0	2	8
BLR totals			136	10	48	58	213	20	2	3	5	45

=== International ===
Year	Team	Event	GP	G	A	Pts	PIM
1990	Soviet Union	EJC	6	2	5	7	8
1993	Ukraine	WC C	7	2	4	6	8
1994	Ukraine	WC C	6	0	2	2	2
1995	Ukraine	WC C	4	0	1	1	0
1998	Ukraine	WC B	7	0	5	5	4
1999	Ukraine	WC	3	0	0	0	6
2001	Ukraine	OGQ	3	0	0	0	0
2002	Ukraine	OG	4	0	1	1	4
2002	Ukraine	WC	6	0	0	0	2
2003	Ukraine	WC	6	0	0	0	6
2004	Ukraine	WC	6	0	2	2	4
2005	Ukraine	OGQ	3	0	0	0	2
2005	Ukraine	WC	5	0	1	1	0
2006	Ukraine	WC	6	2	1	3	16
2007	Ukraine	WC	6	0	0	0	6
2008	Ukraine	WC D1	5	0	0	0	4
2009	Ukraine	OGQ	2	0	0	0	0
2009	Ukraine	WC D1	5	0	2	2	2
Senior totals			84	4	19	23	66
