= Borys Protsenko =

Ukrainian Ice Hockey Player

- Born: 21 August 1978 (age 48) Kyiv, Ukrainian SSR, Soviet Union
- Height: 6 ft 0 in (183 cm)
- Weight: 192 lb (87 kg; 13 st 10 lb)
- Position: Right wing
- Shot: Right
- Played for: Dinamo Minsk; Fresno Falcons; HC Berkut; Houston Aeros; Khabarovsk Amur; Mechel Chelyabinsk; Sokil Kyiv; South Carolina Stingrays; Syracuse Crunch; Wheeling Nailers; Wilkes-Barre/Scranton Penguins
- National team: Ukraine
- NHL draft: 77th overall, 1996; Pittsburgh Penguins
- Playing career: 1998–2011

Borys Protsenko (born 21 August 1978) is a Ukrainian former professional ice hockey player and a Russian amateur scout for the NHL's Dallas Stars.

== Career ==
Protsenko was drafted 1st overall by the Calgary Hitmen in the 1995 CHL Import Draft. A year later, he was drafted in the third round of the 1996 NHL entry draft by the Pittsburgh Penguins, selected 77th overall. Although Protsenko never played for the Pittsburgh Penguins, he did spend two years with the Penguins' AHL affiliate in Syracuse and Wilkes-Barre and an additional year with the Penguins' ECHL affiliate in Wheeling.

Protsenko spent the next two seasons splitting time in Russia and with the Ukraine National Team. He started the 2003-04 season with Sokil Kyiv, but later returned to the United States and joined the Fresno Falcons. Protsenko was recalled by the Houston Aeros on 16 January 2004 but was returned to the Falcons less than a week later. Protsenko finished the season with the South Carolina Stingrays.

Protsenko played the next three seasons in Belarus, Russia, and the Ukraine and retired after the completion of the 2006-07 season. Since his retirement, Protsenko has been the Russian amateur scout for the Dallas Stars.

== Career statistics ==
			Regular season					Playoffs
Season	Team	League	GP	G	A	Pts	PIM	GP	G	A	Pts	PIM
1994–95	Fernie Ghostriders	RMJHL	47	27	25	52	199	—	—	—	—	—
1995–96	Calgary Hitmen	WHL	71	46	29	75	68	—	—	—	—	—
1996–97	Calgary Hitmen	WHL	67	35	32	67	136	—	—	—	—	—
1997–98	Calgary Hitmen	WHL	70	40	47	87	124	18	6	8	14	30
1998–99	Syracuse Crunch	AHL	64	24	24	48	84	—	—	—	—	—
1999–00	Wilkes-Barre/Scranton Penguins	AHL	64	15	21	36	41	—	—	—	—	—
2000–01	Wheeling Nailers	ECHL	48	15	11	26	42	—	—	—	—	—
2001–02	Amur Khabarovsk	Russia	1	0	0	0	2	—	—	—	—	—
2002–03	Mechel Chelyabinsk	Russia	4	1	0	1	0	—	—	—	—	—
2002–03	Sokil Kyiv	Ukraine	—	—	—	—	—	1	0	1	1	0
2002–03	Sokil Kyiv	EEHL	18	5	5	10	46	—	—	—	—	—
2003–04	Sokil Kyiv	EEHL	14	5	4	9	18	—	—	—	—	—
2003–04	Houston Aeros	AHL	2	0	0	0	14	—	—	—	—	—
2003–04	Fresno Falcons	ECHL	33	11	16	27	51	—	—	—	—	—
2003–04	South Carolina Stingrays	ECHL	16	3	6	9	32	—	—	—	—	—
2004–05	Sokil Kyiv	Belarus	7	3	1	4	6	12	1	1	2	6
2004–05	HC Dinamo Minsk	Belarus	14	3	6	9	32	—	—	—	—	—
2005–06	HC Dinamo Minsk	Belarus	32	8	11	19	56	10	1	4	5	6
2005–06	Avangard Omsk-2	Russia3	7	1	11	12	16	—	—	—	—	—
2006–07	Berkut Brovary	Ukraine	16	13	22	35	20	—	—	—	—	—
2007–08	Bilyy Bars Brovary	Ukraine	1	0	1	1	0	2	1	1	2	0
2010–11	HC Podol Kyiv	Ukraine	1	0	0	0	4	—	—	—	—	—
AHL totals			130	39	45	84	139	—	—	—	—	—
