= Alexander Vasilevski (ice hockey, born 1975) =

- Born: January 8, 1975 (age 51) Kiev, Soviet Union
- Height: 5 ft 11 in (180 cm)
- Weight: 190 lb (86 kg; 13 st 8 lb)
- Position: Right wing
- Shot: Left
- Played for: Bilyi Bars Brovary; HC Berkut; HK Gomel; HK Mogilev; Sokil Kyiv; Mechel Chelyabinsk; Severstal Cherepovets; Krylia Sovetov Moscow; St. Louis Blues
- NHL draft: 271st overall, 1993; St. Louis Blues
- Playing career: 1995–2010

Alexander Alexandrovich Vasilevski, also known as Alexander Vasilevskii (Ukrainian: Олександр Олександрович Василевський; born January 8, 1975) is a Ukrainian former professional ice hockey player. He played 4 games in the National Hockey League with the St. Louis Blues during the 1995–96 and 1996–97 seasons. The rest of his career, which lasted from 1995 to 2010, was mainly spent in European leagues. He was selected by the St. Louis Blues in the 11th round (271st overall) of the 1993 NHL entry draft.

== Playing career ==
Vasilevski played four seasons of major junior hockey (1992–1995) in the Western Hockey League (WHL) with the Victoria Cougars, Prince George Cougars, and the Brandon Wheat Kings. He turned professional with the 1995–96 season, playing 69 games in the American Hockey League (AHL) with the Worcester IceCats, and one game in the NHL with the St. Louis Blues. The following season he was given three more games with the St. Louis Blues, but failed to stick with the NHL team.

Vasilevski went on to play 14 seasons in North America and Europe before retiring following the 2009–10 season which he played with HC Bilyy Bars Brovary in the Ukrainian Professional Hockey League.

== Career statistics ==
=== Regular season and playoffs ===
			Regular season					Playoffs
Season	Team	League	GP	G	A	Pts	PIM	GP	G	A	Pts	PIM
1991–92	Sokol Kiev	USSR	—	—	—	—	—	—	—	—	—	—
1991–92	ShVSM Kiev	USSR-3	4	0	1	1	0	—	—	—	—	—
1992–93	Victoria Cougars	WHL	71	27	25	52	52	—	—	—	—	—
1993–94	Victoria Cougars	WHL	69	34	51	85	78	—	—	—	—	—
1994–95	Prince George Cougars	WHL	48	32	34	66	52	—	—	—	—	—
1994–95	Brandon Wheat Kings	WHL	23	6	11	17	39	18	3	6	9	34
1994–95	Brandon Wheat Kings	M-Cup	—	—	—	—	—	4	0	1	1	2
1995–96	St. Louis Blues	NHL	1	0	0	0	0	—	—	—	—	—
1995–96	Worcester IceCats	AHL	69	18	21	39	112	4	2	1	3	10
1996–97	St. Louis Blues	NHL	3	0	0	0	2	—	—	—	—	—
1996–97	Worcester IceCats	AHL	61	9	23	32	100	—	—	—	—	—
1996–97	Grand Rapids Griffins	IHL	10	1	5	6	43	5	0	1	1	19
1997–98	Hamilton Bulldogs	AHL	41	3	14	17	60	—	—	—	—	—
1997–98	Detroit Vipers	IHL	9	1	1	2	7	—	—	—	—	—
1998–99	Krylya Sovetov Moscow	RSL	7	2	1	3	4	—	—	—	—	—
1998–99	Sokol Kiev	EEHL	2	1	1	2	2	—	—	—	—	—
1998–99	Severstal Cherepovets	RSL	2	0	0	0	0	—	—	—	—	—
1999–00	Muskegon Fury	UHL	19	10	8	18	22	—	—	—	—	—
1999–00	Long Beach Ice Dogs	IHL	51	8	25	33	109	5	0	3	3	4
2001–02	Mechel Chelyabinsk	RSL	11	1	2	3	4	—	—	—	—	—
2001–02	Mechel Chelyabinsk-2	RUS-3	1	1	1	2	0	—	—	—	—	—
2001–02	Sokol Kiev	EEHL	20	3	14	17	14	—	—	—	—	—
2001–02	Sokol Kiev	UKR	8	2	9	11	6	—	—	—	—	—
2002–03	Sokol Kiev	EEHL	15	4	2	6	42	—	—	—	—	—
2002–03	EV Zeltweg	AUT-2	11	5	16	21	10	—	—	—	—	—
2003–04	Olimpiya Kirovo-Chepetsk	RUS-2	59	5	17	22	100	—	—	—	—	—
2004–05	HK Khimvolokno Mogilev	BLR	32	7	19	26	65	7	0	1	1	2
2004–05	HK Khimvolokno Mogilev-2	BLR-2	6	5	8	13	2	—	—	—	—	—
2005–06	HK Gomel	BLR	41	3	18	21	36	1	0	0	0	0
2005–06	HK Gomel-2	BLR-2	2	1	1	2	0	—	—	—	—	—
2006–07	HC Berkut	UKR	26	9	21	30	12	—	—	—	—	—
2007–08	Sokol Kiev	RUS-2	22	1	4	5	6	—	—	—	—	—
2007–08	Sokol Kiev-2	UKR	8	2	11	13	6	2	2	1	3	0
2008–09	Bilyi Bars Brovary	UKR	28	16	44	60	20	7	2	9	11	6
2009–10	Bilyi Bars Brovary	UKR	18	9	24	33	16	—	—	—	—	—
AHL totals			171	30	58	88	272	4	2	1	3	10
NHL totals			4	0	0	0	2	—	—	—	—	—
