= 2000–01 Ukrainian Hockey Championship =

- League: Ukrainian Hockey Championship
- Sport: Ice hockey
- Number of teams: 14

Regular season
- Regular season winners: HC Kharkiv

Playoffs
- Finals champions: HC Berkut
- Runners-up: HC Sokil Kyiv

Ukrainian Hockey Championship seasons
- ← 1999–2000 2001–02 →

The 2000–01 Ukrainian Hockey League season was the eighth season of the Ukrainian Hockey League, the top level of ice hockey in Ukraine. 14 teams participated in the league, and HC Berkut won the championship.

== First round ==
=== Central ===
	Club	GP	W	T	L	GF:GA	Pts
1.	Politekhnik Kyiv	8	6	1	1	56:33	13
2.	HK ATEK Kyiv	8	5	2	1	50:28	12
3.	HC Sokil Kyiv II	8	1	2	5	35:36	4
4.	HK Kryzhynka Kyiv	8	0	2	6	24:26	2
5.	Sdyushor Sokil Kyiv	8	0	1	7	14:56	1

=== East ===
	Club	GP	W	T	L	GF:GA	Pts
1.	HC Kharkiv	12	10	0	1	78:26	22
2.	Sdyushor Kharkiv	12	9	1	2	54:32	19
3.	Ukrainian Juniors	12	5	2	5	28:57	12
4.	HK Belgorod	12	1	2	9	18:63	4

=== South ===
	Club	GP	W	T	L	GF:GA	Pts
1.	Dnipro Kherson	6	4	1	1	21:5	9
2.	HK Aurora Odessa	6	3	0	3	15:18	6
3.	HK Mykolaiv Mykolaiv	6	0	1	5	11:24	1

== Second round ==
	Club	GP	W	T	L	GF:GA	Pts
1.	HC Kharkiv	4	4	0	0	47:7	8
2.	Politekhnik Kyiv	4	3	0	1	47:21	6
3.	HK ATEK Kyiv	4	2	0	2	51:27	4
4.	Dnipro Kherson	4	1	0	3	19:32	2
5.	Gladiator Lviv	4	0	0	4	13:90	0

== Playoffs ==
Semifinals

- HC Sokil Kyiv 13 - HC Kharkiv 0
- HC Berkut 5 - Politechnik Yasya Kyiv 0

Final

- HC Berkut 2 - HC Sokil Kyiv 1

3rd place

- Politechnika Yasya Kyiv 5 - HC Kharkiv 0
