= 2001–02 Ukrainian Hockey Championship =

- League: Ukrainian Hockey Championship
- Sport: Ice hockey
- Number of teams: 13

Regular season
- Regular season winners: HC Berkut

Playoffs
- Finals champions: HC Berkut
- Runners-up: HC Sokil Kyiv

Ukrainian Hockey Championship seasons
- ← 2000–01 2002–03 →

The 2001–02 Ukrainian Hockey League season was the ninth season of the Ukrainian Hockey League, the top level of ice hockey in Ukraine. 13 teams participated in the league, and HC Berkut won the championship.

== First round ==
=== Division A ===
==== Standings ====
	Club	GP	W	T	L	GF:GA	Pts
1.	HC Berkut	10	9	0	1	63:24	27
2.	HC Sokil Kyiv	10	7	0	3	73:17	21
3.	HC Donbass	10	7	0	3	41:29	21
4.	Politekhnik Kyiv	10	4	0	6	31:49	12
5.	HK ATEK Kyiv	10	2	0	8	32:59	6
6.	HK Kyiv	10	1	0	9	22:84	3

=== Division B ===
==== Group A ====
	Club	GP	W	T	L	GF:GA	Pts
1.	Barvinok Kharkiv	2	2	0	0	7:4	4
2.	Khimik Sievierodonetsk	2	1	0	1	7:7	2
3.	Soniachna Dolyna Odesa	2	0	0	2	7:10	0

==== Group B ====
	Club	GP	W	T	L	GF:GA	Pts
1.	Druzhba-78 Kharkiv	3	3	0	0	38:2	9
2.	Dnipro Kherson	3	2	0	1	26:12	6
3.	HK Smila	3	1	0	2	19:19	3
4.	Gladiator Lviv	3	0	0	3	7:57	0

==== Playoff-Qualification ====
Semifinals

- Barvinok Kharkiv 18 - HK Dnipro Kherson 0
- Druzhba-78 Kharkiv 3 - Khimik Severdonetsk 1

Final

- Barvinok Kharkiv 2 - Druzhba-78 Kharkiv 0

3rd place

- Khimik Severdonetsk 9 - HK Dnipro Kherson 2

== Playoffs ==
=== Pre-Playoffs ===
- Politekhnik Kyiv - HK ATEK Kyiv 0:2
- HC Donbass - Barvinok Kharkiv 2:0

=== Semifinals ===
- HC Berkut 2 - HK ATEK Kyiv 0
- HC Sokil Kyiv 5 - HK Donbass Donetsk 0

=== Final ===
- HC Berkut 2 - HC Sokil Kyiv 1

=== 3rd place ===
- HK Donbass Donetsk 2 - HK ATEK Kyiv 0
