= Vadym Shakhraychuk =

Ukrainian ice hockey player (born 1974)

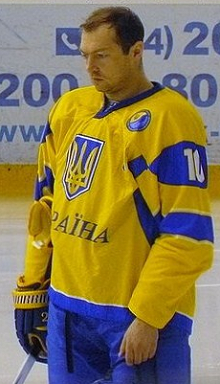
- Shakhraychuk in 2010
- Born: 12 June 1974 (age 52) Kyiv, Ukrainian SSR, Soviet Union
- Height: 6 ft 3 in (191 cm)
- Weight: 214 lb (97 kg; 15 st 4 lb)
- Position: Centre
- Shot: Left
- Played for: Kompanion Kyiv; Sokil Kyiv; HKM Zvolen; Torpedo Nizhny Novgorod; Metallurg Magnitogorsk; Traktor Chelyabinsk; MVD; Dynamo Moscow; ATEK Kyiv; Spartak Moscow; Lokomotiv Yaroslavl; Avangard Omsk; Nürnberg Ice Tigers; Ak Bars Kazan; ShVSM Kyiv
- National team: Ukraine
- Playing career: 1991–2013

Vadym Valeriyovych Shakhraychuk (Ukrainian: Вадим Валерійович Шахрайчук, born 12 June 1974) is a Ukrainian retired professional ice hockey player who has served as the head coach of the Ukrainian national team since 2021.

He played for multiple teams in Russia, as well as with Sokil Kyiv in Ukraine. He played internationally for the Ukrainian national team at several World Championships, as well as the 2002 Winter Olympics.

== Career statistics ==
=== Regular season and playoffs ===
			Regular season					Playoffs
Season	Team	League	GP	G	A	Pts	PIM	GP	G	A	Pts	PIM
1991–92	Sokil Kyiv	CIS	1	0	0	0	0	—	—	—	—	—
1991–92	ShVSM Kyiv	CIS.3	49	17	1	18	45	—	—	—	—	—
1992–93	Sokil Kyiv	IHL	1	0	0	0	0	—	—	—	—	—
1992–93	Sokil–2 Kyiv	RUS.2	36	7	1	8	24	—	—	—	—	—
1993–94	Sokil Kyiv	IHL	38	5	3	8	54	—	—	—	—	—
1993–94	ShVSM Kyiv	RUS.3	2	0	1	1	4	—	—	—	—	—
1994–95	Sokil Kyiv	IHL	45	10	4	14	83	—	—	—	—	—
1995–96	Sokil Kyiv	IHL	26	5	2	7	59	—	—	—	—	—
1995–96	Ak Bars Kazan	IHL	25	6	7	13	45	5	1	1	2	6
1996–97	Ak Bars Kazan	RSL	36	8	8	16	84	3	0	1	1	0
1997–98	Nürnberg Ice Tigers	DEL	44	9	22	31	70	5	3	2	5	14
1998–99	Nürnberg Ice Tigers	DEL	38	6	5	11	98	10	0	2	2	12
1999–2000	Nürnberg Ice Tigers	DEL	55	5	11	16	67	—	—	—	—	—
2000–01	Avangard Omsk	RSL	44	9	6	15	73	15	2	0	2	39
2001–02	Lokomotiv Yaroslavl	RSL	43	8	16	24	120	9	0	1	1	25
2002–03	Lokomotiv Yaroslavl	RSL	25	3	5	8	16	—	—	—	—	—
2002–03	Spartak Moscow	RSL	20	2	3	5	54	—	—	—	—	—
2002–03	HK ATEK Kyiv	UKR	3	5	2	7	6	—	—	—	—	—
2003–04	Dynamo Moscow	RSL	60	10	11	21	108	3	0	0	0	4
2004–05	Dynamo Moscow	RSL	55	8	13	21	56	10	3	2	5	16
2005–06	Dynamo Moscow	RSL	50	9	12	21	52	4	2	1	3	6
2006–07	Dynamo Moscow	RSL	47	8	13	21	71	3	0	0	0	2
2007–08	HK MVD	RSL	57	10	9	19	120	3	1	0	1	2
2008–09	Traktor Chelyabinsk	KHL	30	5	3	8	28	—	—	—	—	—
2008–09	Metallurg Magnitogorsk	KHL	24	1	1	2	45	12	0	1	1	2
2009–10	Torpedo Nizhny Novgorod	KHL	49	9	8	17	60	—	—	—	—	—
2010–11	Sokil Kyiv	BLR	48	24	21	45	50	3	2	2	4	20
2010–11	Sokil–2 Kyiv	UKR	1	0	3	3	0	—	—	—	—	—
2011–12	HKm Zvolen	SVK	14	3	4	7	45	—	—	—	—	—
2011–12	Sokil Kyiv	UKR	12	7	5	12	2	—	—	—	—	—
2012–13	Sokil Kyiv	UKR	9	2	5	7	12	—	—	—	—	—
2012–13	Kompanion Kyiv	UKR	6	0	7	7	10	12	1	5	6	14
IHL totals			135	26	16	42	241	5	1	1	2	6
RSL totals			437	75	96	171	754	50	8	5	13	94
KHL totals			103	15	12	27	133	12	0	1	1	2

=== International ===
Year	Team	Event	GP	G	A	Pts	PIM
1993	Ukraine	WJC C	4	2	5	7	0
1994	Ukraine	WJC B	7	7	8	15	12
1995	Ukraine	WC C	4	3	1	4	8
1997	Ukraine	OGQ	4	4	5	9
1997	Ukraine	WC C	4	1	1	2	10
1998	Ukraine	WC B	7	7	1	8	14
1999	Ukraine	WC	3	0	0	0	8
1999	Ukraine	WC Q	3	0	0	0	0
2000	Ukraine	WC	6	2	2	4	14
2001	Ukraine	OGQ	3	2	0	2	4
2001	Ukraine	WC	6	2	1	3	12
2002	Ukraine	OG	4	2	0	2	4
2002	Ukraine	WC	6	4	1	5	4
2003	Ukraine	WC	5	2	1	3	8
2004	Ukraine	WC	6	3	1	4	6
2005	Ukraine	WC	4	0	2	2	0
2006	Ukraine	WC	6	0	1	1	28
2008	Ukraine	WC D1	5	2	3	5	2
2009	Ukraine	OGQ	3	1	0	1	2
2009	Ukraine	WC D1	5	0	3	3	4
2010	Ukraine	WC D1	5	4	4	8	6
2011	Ukraine	WC D1	5	1	3	4	4
Junior totals			11	9	13	22	12
Senior totals			94	40	30	70	138
