= Vyacheslav Timchenko (ice hockey) =

Ukrainian ice hockey player

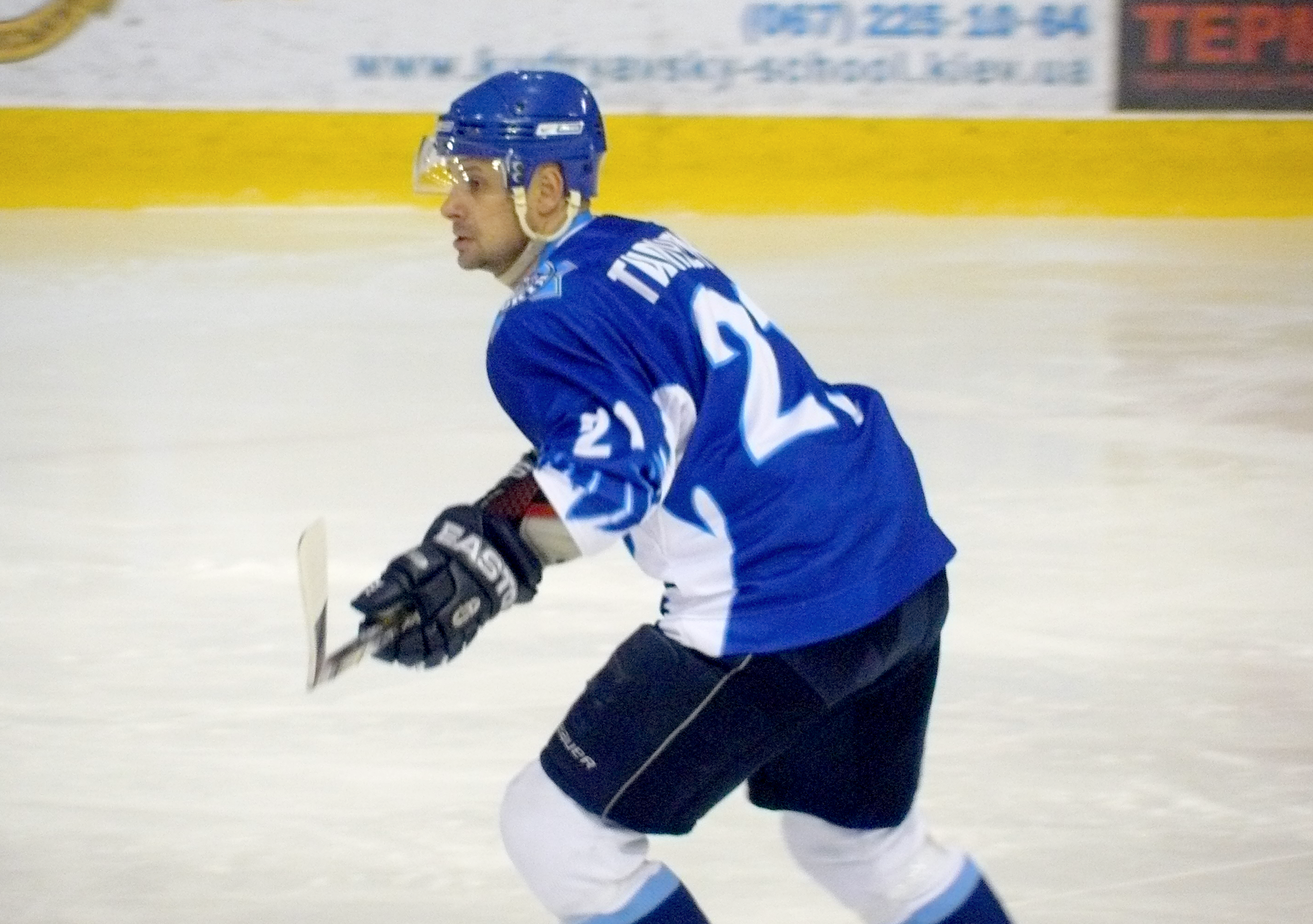
- Born: 16 August 1971 (age 55) Kiev, Ukrainian SSR, Soviet Union
- Height: 5 ft 11 in (180 cm)
- Weight: 190 lb (86 kg; 13 st 8 lb)
- Position: Defenceman
- Shot: Left
- Played for: Sokil Kyiv; Bilyi Bars; Kompanion Kyiv; HK Vitebsk; HK Gomel; Hull Stingrays; Lausitzer Füchse; ES Weisswasser; HC Berkut-Kyiv; HK Voronezh; HC Neftekhimik Nizhnekamsk; ShVSM Kyiv
- National team: Ukraine
- Playing career: 1987–2014
Medal record
Men's ice hockey
Representing Soviet Union
European Junior Championships
Gold medal – first place	1989 Soviet Union

Viacheslav Mikolaiovych Tymchenko (Note: Often transliterated as Vyacheslav Nikolayevich Timchenko through a Russified Romanization of Вячеслав Николаевич Тимченко.) (Ukrainian: В'ячеслав Миколайович Тимченко; born 16 August 1971) is a Ukrainian retired professional ice hockey player. He played for multiple teams during a career that lasted from 1987 until 2014. He also played internationally for the Ukrainian national team at several World Championships, as well as the 2002 Winter Olympics.

== Career statistics ==
=== Regular season and playoffs ===
			Regular season					Playoffs
Season	Team	League	GP	G	A	Pts	PIM	GP	G	A	Pts	PIM
1987–88	ShVSM Kyiv	URS.2	4	0	0	0	0	—	—	—	—	—
1988–89	Sokil Kyiv	URS	5	0	0	0	0	—	—	—	—	—
1988–89	ShVSM Kyiv	URS.2	23	1	0	1	10	—	—	—	—	—
1989–90	Sokil Kyiv	URS	28	0	0	0	12	—	—	—	—	—
1989–90	ShVSM Kyiv	URS.3	10	3	0	3	10	—	—	—	—	—
1990–91	Sokil Kyiv	URS	30	1	3	4	28	—	—	—	—	—
1990–91	ShVSM Kyiv	URS.3	9	4	0	4	10	—	—	—	—	—
1991–92	Sokil Kyiv	CIS	28	0	2	2	24	—	—	—	—	—
1992–93	Sokil–2 Kyiv	RUS.2	2	1	0	1	6	—	—	—	—	—
1993–94	Sokil Kyiv	IHL	43	5	1	6	20	—	—	—	—	—
1994–95	Sokil Kyiv	IHL	20	2	1	3	22	—	—	—	—	—
1995–96	Sokil Kyiv	IHL	50	1	4	5	44	—	—	—	—	—
1996–97	Neftekhimik Nizhnekamsk	RSL	44	1	3	4	28	2	0	0	0	2
1997–98	Neftekhimik Nizhnekamsk	RSL	43	2	5	7	20	2	0	0	0	0
1997–98	Neftekhimik–2 Nizhnekamsk	RUS.3	1	0	0	0	0	—	—	—	—	—
1998–99	Neftekhimik Nizhnekamsk	RSL	42	2	6	8	22	3	0	1	1	0
1999–2000	HK Voronezh	RUS.2	44	5	11	16	60	—	—	—	—	—
2000–01	Berkut Kyiv	EEHL	30	5	19	24	18	—	—	—	—	—
2001–02	ES Weißwasser	GER.2	44	7	11	18	58	3	0	1	1	0
2002–03	Lausitzer Füchse	GER.2	43	2	11	13	54	—	—	—	—	—
2003–04	Hull Stingrays	GBR.2	31	5	10	15	46	—	—	—	—	—
2004–05	HK Gomel	BLR	39	5	12	17	32	5	0	2	2	8
2005–06	HK Gomel	BLR	52	6	14	20	86	3	0	2	2	4
2006–07	HK Gomel	BLR	41	10	21	31	54	2	0	0	0	6
2007–08	HK Gomel	BLR	27	0	5	5	42	—	—	—	—	—
2008–09	HK Vitebsk	BLR	41	7	13	20	70	4	2	2	4	12
2009–10	HK Vitebsk	BLR	47	1	10	11	52	3	0	0	0	4
2010–11	Sokil Kyiv	UKR	44	3	3	6	62	2	0	0	0	2
2011–12	Sokil Kyiv	UKR	39	1	5	6	38	—	—	—	—	—
2012–13	HC Kompanion–Naftogaz	UKR	10	0	1	1	6	—	—	—	—	—
2012–13	Bilyy Bars Bila Tserkva	UKR	28	1	2	3	28	—	—	—	—	—
2013–14	Sokil Kyiv	UKR	22	0	1	1	14	2	0	0	0	0
URS/CIS totals			91	1	5	6	64	—	—	—	—	—
IHL & RSL totals			242	13	20	33	156	7	0	1	1	2
BLR totals			291	32	78	110	398	19	2	6	8	36

=== International ===
Year	Team	Event	GP	G	A	Pts	PIM
1989	Soviet Union	EJC	4	1	0	1	4
1994	Ukraine	WC C	6	0	1	1	6
1996	Ukraine	WC C	7	1	3	4	0
2001	Ukraine	OGQ	3	0	0	0	2
2002	Ukraine	OG	4	0	0	0	8
2002	Ukraine	WC	6	0	1	1	14
2003	Ukraine	WC	6	0	0	0	12
2005	Ukraine	OGQ	2	1	0	1	2
2005	Ukraine	WC	6	0	1	1	8
2007	Ukraine	WC	5	0	0	0	2
Senior totals			45	2	6	8	54
