= Vladislav Sierov =

Ukrainian ice hockey player

- Born: June 14, 1978 Kyiv, Ukrainian SSR, Soviet Union
- Died: September, 2012 (age 34)
- Height: 5 ft 8 in (173 cm)
- Weight: 183 lb (83 kg; 13 st 1 lb)
- Position: Right wing
- Shot: Right
- National team: Ukraine
- Playing career: 1990–2011

Vladislav Oleksandrovych Sierov (Ukrainian: Владислав Олександрович Сєров; 14 June 1978 — 5 September 2012), was a Ukrainian professional ice hockey player. He played for multiple teams during his career, which lasted from 1999 until 2007. He played internationally for the Ukrainian national team at the 2004 World Championship and the 2002 Winter Olympics. Married with two daughters, he died on 5 September 2012.

== Career statistics ==
=== Regular season and playoffs ===
			Regular season					Playoffs
Season	Team	League	GP	G	A	Pts	PIM	GP	G	A	Pts	PIM
1995–96	Rayside–Balfour Sabrecats	NOJHL	18	11	10	21	2	12	2	10	12	10
1996–97	Torpedo–2 Yaroslavl	RUS.3	18	8	5	13	2	—	—	—	—	—
1997–98	Torpedo–2 Nizhny Novgorod	RUS.3	20	7	10	17	12	—	—	—	—	—
1998–99	Fort McMurray Oil Barons	AJHL	36	25	17	42	20	—	—	—	—	—
1999–2000	Flint Generals	UHL	20	7	10	17	12	15	9	7	16	17
1999–2000	Detroit Vipers	IHL	1	0	0	0	2	—	—	—	—	—
1999–2000	Manitoba Moose	IHL	51	11	9	20	16	—	—	—	—	—
2000–01	Hershey Bears	AHL	7	1	2	3	2	—	—	—	—	—
2000–01	Chicago Wolves	IHL	4	0	1	1	2	—	—	—	—	—
2000–01	Quad City Mallards	UHL	29	33	13	46	26	12	12	7	19	6
2001–02	Greensboro Generals	ECHL	46	20	14	34	37	—	—	—	—	—
2002–03	Greensboro Generals	ECHL	26	11	11	22	38	—	—	—	—	—
2003–04	Sokol Kyiv	EEHL	10	6	2	8	2	—	—	—	—	—
2003–04	HC Eppan Pirates	ITA	18	15	7	22	12	—	—	—	—	—
2004–05	Bakersfield Condors	ECHL	57	19	26	45	61	5	0	0	0	2
2005–06	Motor City Mechanics	UHL	50	20	13	33	18	4	0	1	1	0
2006–07	HC Berkut	UKR	10	3	5	8	4	—	—	—	—	—
2006–07	ATEK Kyiv	UKR	8	6	5	11	6	—	—	—	—	—
UHL totals			98	68	37	105	67	31	21	15	36	23
ECHL totals			129	50	51	101	136	5	0	0	0	2

=== International ===
Year	Team	Event	GP	G	A	Pts	PIM
1997	Ukraine	WJC C	7	6	2	8	2
2002	Ukraine	OLY	4	0	1	1	0
2004	Ukraine	WC	5	0	0	0	0
Senior totals			9	0	1	1	0
