= 2003–04 Ukrainian Hockey Championship =

- League: Ukrainian Hockey Championship
- Sport: Ice hockey
- Number of teams: 13

Regular season
- Regular season winners: HK Kyiv

Playoffs
- Finals champions: HC Sokil Kyiv
- Runners-up: HK Kyiv

Ukrainian Hockey Championship seasons
- ← 2002–03 2004–05 →

The 2003–04 Ukrainian Hockey League season was the 11th season of the Ukrainian Hockey League, the top level of ice hockey in Ukraine. Thirteen teams participated in the league, and HC Sokol Kyiv won the championship.

== First round ==
=== Division A ===
	Club	GP	W	OTW	T	OTL	L	GF:GA	Pts
1.	HK Kyiv	16	15	0	0	0	1	102:18	45
2.	HK ATEK Kyiv	16	10	0	2	0	4	55:41	32
3.	Barvinok Kharkiv	19	8	1	2	0	8	77:44	28
4.	Druzhba-78 Kharkiv	17	3	1	0	1	12	47:43	11
5.	Khimik Sievierodonetsk	16	0	0	0	1	15	20:155	0

=== Division B ===
==== Group A ====
	Club	Pts
1.	HK Dnipro Kherson	8
2.	Politekhnik Kyiv	6
3.	HK Dniprovski Vovki Dnipropetrovsk	3
4.	Sumski Vorony Sumy	0

==== Group B ====
	Club	Pts
1.	Meteor Dnipropetrovsk	6
2.	Soniachna Dolyna Odessa	3
3.	Gladiator Lviv	0

==== Placing round ====
===== 5th place =====
- HK Dniprovski Vovki Dnipropetrovsk - Gladiator Lviv 2:4

===== 3rd place =====
- Politekhnik Kyiv - Sonyatschna Dolyna Odessa 2:3

===== Final =====
- HK Dnipro Kherson - Meteor Dnipropetrovsk 5:9

== Playoffs ==
=== Pre-Playoffs ===
- Druzhba-78 Kharkiv - Meteor Dnipropetrovsk 3:5/2:1

=== Semifinals ===
- HK ATEK Kyiv - Barvinok Kharkiv 2:1
- HK Kyiv - Meteor Dnipropetrovsk 2:0

=== Qualification ===
- HK Kyiv - HK ATEK Kyiv 2:0

=== Final ===
- HC Sokil Kyiv - HK Kyiv 2:0
