= Valentyn Oletsky =

Ukrainian ice hockey player

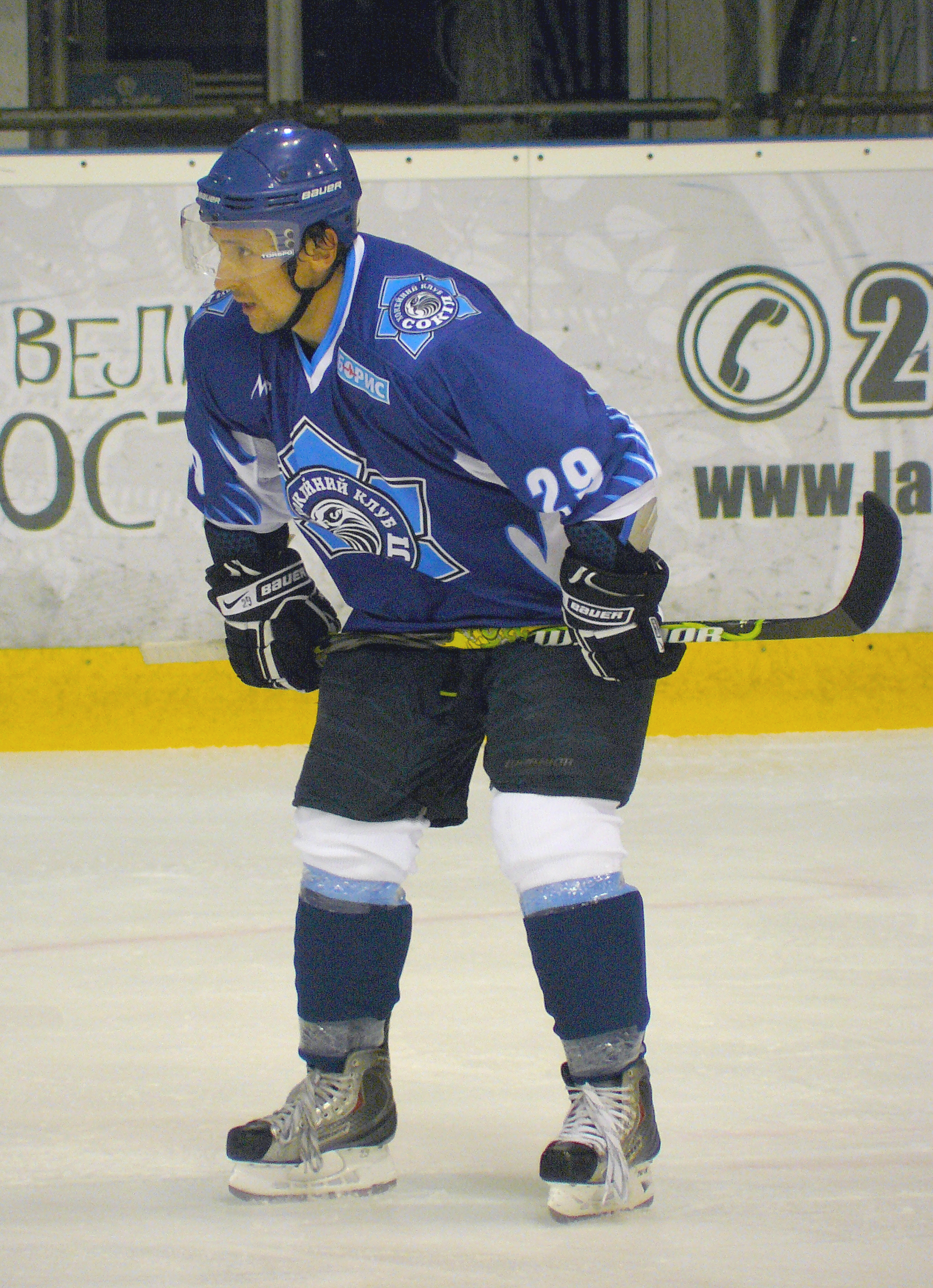
- Oletsky in 2010
- Born: 2 June 1971 (age 55) Kiev, Ukrainian SSR, Soviet Union
- Height: 5 ft 9 in (175 cm)
- Weight: 183 lb (83 kg; 13 st 1 lb)
- Position: Right wing
- Shot: Left
- Played for: Sokil Kyiv; HK Gomel; EV Füssen; Elmira Jackals; Idaho Steelheads; SKA St. Petersburg; Torpedo Nizhny Novgorod; ShVSM Kyiv
- National team: Ukraine
- Playing career: 1987–2013
Medal record
Men's ice hockey
Representing Soviet Union
European Junior Championships
Gold medal – first place	1989 Soviet Union

Valentyn Arnoldovich Oletsky (Ukrainian: Валентин Арнольдович Олецький, born 2 June 1971) is a Ukrainian retired professional ice hockey player. He spent most of his career with Sokil Kyiv. He played internationally for the Ukrainian national team at several World Championships, as well as the 2002 Winter Olympics.

== Career statistics ==
=== Regular season and playoffs ===
			Regular season					Playoffs
Season	Team	League	GP	G	A	Pts	PIM	GP	G	A	Pts	PIM
1987–88	ShVSM Kyiv	URS.2	1	0	0	0	0	—	—	—	—	—
1988–89	ShVSM Kyiv	URS.2	30	4	1	5	18	—	—	—	—	—
1989–90	Sokil Kyiv	URS	33	1	4	5	8	—	—	—	—	—
1989–90	ShVSM Kyiv	URS.3	13	6	0	6	12	—	—	—	—	—
1990–91	Sokil Kyiv	URS	42	7	2	9	18	—	—	—	—	—
1990–91	ShVSM Kyiv	URS.3	10	3	2	5	14	—	—	—	—	—
1991–92	Sokil Kyiv	CIS	29	14	7	21	16	—	—	—	—	—
1992–93	Sokil Kyiv	IHL	41	11	2	13	26	3	1	0	1	2
1992–93	Sokil–2 Kyiv	RUS.2	2	3	2	5	2	—	—	—	—	—
1993–94	Sokil Kyiv	IHL	43	12	5	17	60	—	—	—	—	—
1994–95	Sokil Kyiv	IHL	51	10	8	18	46	—	—	—	—	—
1995–96	Sokil Kyiv	IHL	25	4	5	9	14	—	—	—	—	—
1995–96	Sokil Kyiv	EEHL	2	2	3	5	2	—	—	—	—	—
1996–97	Sokil Kyiv	EEHL	40	32	37	69	26	—	—	—	—	—
1997–98	Torpedo Nizhny Novgorod	RSL	22	4	0	4	18	—	—	—	—	—
1997–98	Sokil Kyiv	EEHL	4	3	2	5	6	—	—	—	—	—
1998–99	Sokil Kyiv	EEHL	4	2	2	4	0	—	—	—	—	—
1998–99	SKA St. Petersburg	RSL	24	2	4	6	20	—	—	—	—	—
1999–2000	Sokil Kyiv	EEHL	46	21	34	55	45	—	—	—	—	—
2000–01	Sokil Kyiv	EEHL	6	0	2	2	6	—	—	—	—	—
2000–01	Idaho Steelheads	WCHL	2	0	0	0	0	—	—	—	—	—
2000–01	Elmira Jackals	UHL	46	8	16	24	14	—	—	—	—	—
2001–02	EV Füssen	GER.3	47	41	41	82	34	—	—	—	—	—
2001–02	Sokil Kyiv	EEHL	1	0	0	0	0	—	—	—	—	—
2002–03	EV Füssen	GER.3	48	31	37	68	54	3	3	1	4	4
2003–04	EV Füssen	GER.3	33	15	23	38	32	—	—	—	—	—
2004–05	Sokil Kyiv	BLR	33	9	17	26	14	12	3	3	7	0
2004–05	Sokil Kyiv	UKR	—	—	—	—	—	2	0	4	4	0
2005–06	Sokil Kyiv	BLR	48	15	19	34	52	3	0	1	1	4
2005–06	Sokil Kyiv	UKR	—	—	—	—	—	3	1	1	2	2
2006–07	HK Gomel	BLR	47	16	30	46	83	5	2	1	3	18
2007–08	HK Gomel	BLR	48	14	14	28	66	—	—	—	—	—
2008–09	HK Gomel	BLR	39	9	14	23	22	14	2	2	4	10
2009–10	Sokil Kyiv	BLR	27	6	5	11	8	7	2	1	3	6
2010–11	Sokil Kyiv	BLR	31	5	10	15	25	—	—	—	—	—
2010–11	Sokil–2 Kyiv	UKR	3	2	3	5	8	—	—	—	—	—
2011–12	Sokil Kyiv	UKR	33	5	16	21	16	—	—	—	—	—
2012–13	Sokil Kyiv	UKR	34	1	6	7	18	10	1	3	4	6
URS/CIS totals			104	22	13	35	42	—	—	—	—	—
IHL totals			160	37	20	57	146	3	1	0	1	2
BLR totals			275	74	109	183	270	41	9	9	18	38

=== International ===
Year	Team	Event	GP	G	A	Pts	PIM
1989	Soviet Union	EJC	3	4	2	6	0
1992	Ukraine	WC C Q	2	0	0	0	0
1993	Ukraine	WC C	7	4	5	9	10
1994	Ukraine	WC C	6	3	1	4	6
1995	Ukraine	WC C	4	2	6	8	2
1996	Ukraine	WC C	7	3	6	9	0
1997	Ukraine	WC C	5	0	1	1	4
1998	Ukraine	WC B	7	3	1	4	8
1999	Ukraine	WC	3	0	0	0	0
1999	Ukraine	WC Q	3	1	0	1	2
2000	Ukraine	WC	2	0	1	1	6
2001	Ukraine	WC	6	0	1	1	4
2002	Ukraine	OG	4	2	1	3	4
2002	Ukraine	WC	6	0	0	0	2
2006	Ukraine	WC	6	0	0	0	0
2007	Ukraine	WC	6	0	2	2	2
2008	Ukraine	WC D1	5	0	0	0	0
Senior totals			79	18	25	43	50
