= Roman Salnikov =

Ukrainian ice hockey player

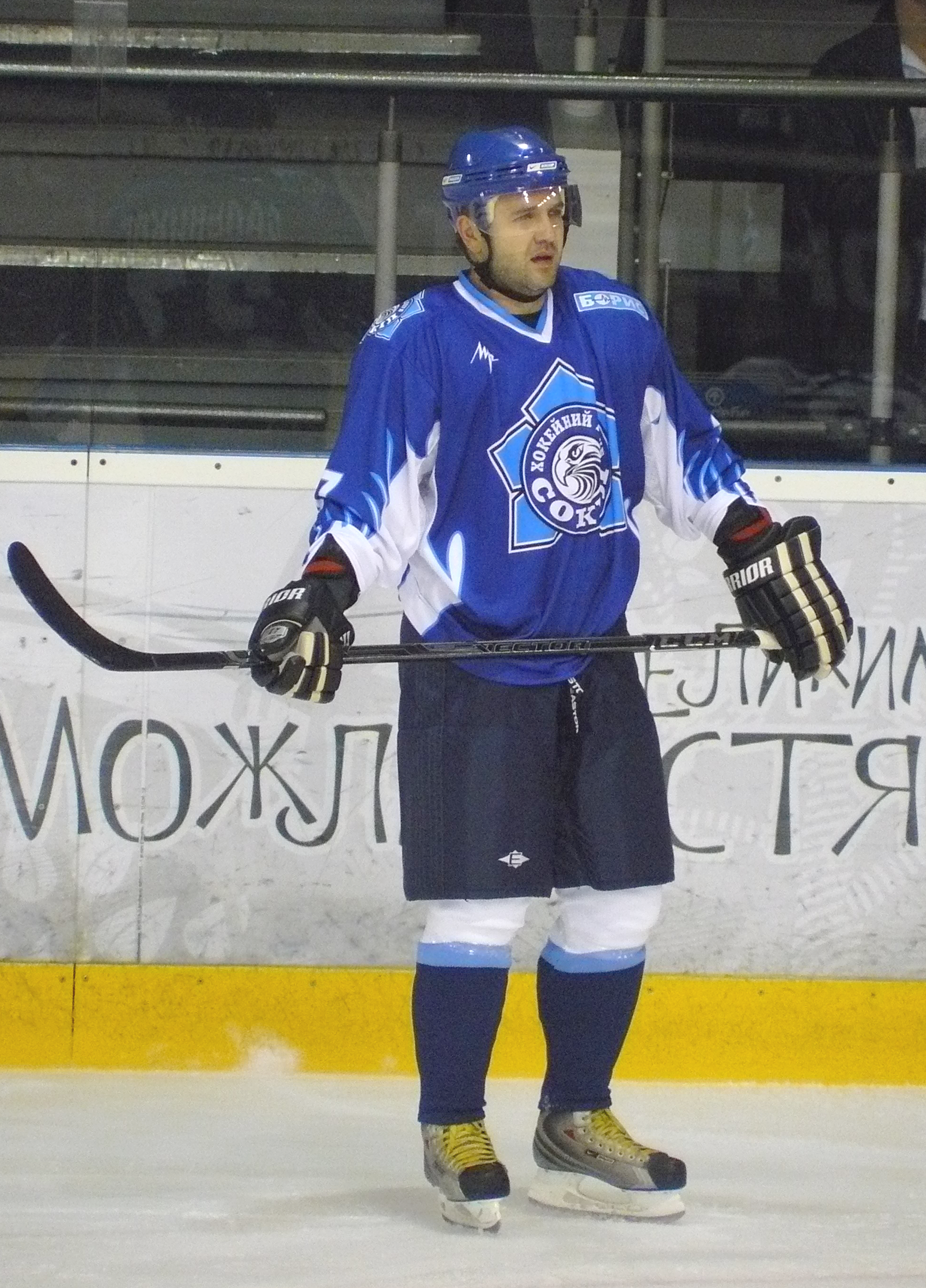
- Salnikov in 2010
- Born: February 18, 1976 (age 49) Kharkiv, Soviet Union
- Height: 6 ft 0 in (183 cm)
- Weight: 209 lb (95 kg; 14 st 13 lb)
- Position: Right wing
- Shot: Right
- Played for: Sokil Kiev; HC Neftekhimik Nizhnekamsk; Krylya Sovetov Moscow; Barvinok Kharkiv; Amur Khabarovsk; Keramin Minsk; HC Berkut-Kiev; Kompanion Kiev; HK Vityaz Kharkiv
- National team: Ukraine
- Playing career: 1993–2017

Roman Ivanovych Salnikov (Ukrainian: Роман Іванович Сальников; born February 18, 1976, in Kharkiv, Soviet Union) is a Ukrainian former ice hockey left wing.

Salnikov played in the Russian Superleague for HC Neftekhimik Nizhnekamsk, Krylya Sovetov Moscow and Amur Khabarovsk.

He was also a member of the Ukraine national ice hockey team, playing in eight World Championships as well as the 2002 Winter Olympics

== Career statistics ==
=== Regular season and playoffs ===
			Regular season					Playoffs
Season	Team	League	GP	G	A	Pts	PIM	GP	G	A	Pts	PIM
1993–94	CSKA–2 Moscow	RUS.3	16	0	0	0	4	—	—	—	—	—
1993–94	ShVSM Kyiv	RUS.3	6	0	0	0	6	—	—	—	—	—
1994–95	Sokil Kyiv	IHL	7	0	0	0	0	—	—	—	—	—
1994–95	Sokil–2 Kyiv	RUS.2	24	6	3	9	40	—	—	—	—	—
1995–96	Sokil Kyiv	EEHL	7	1	0	1	6	—	—	—	—	—
1995–96	Sokil Kyiv	IHL	30	2	3	5	24	—	—	—	—	—
1996–97	Sokil Kyiv	EEHL	40	26	15	41	48	—	—	—	—	—
1997–98	Neftekhimik Nizhnekamsk	RSL	45	8	12	20	48	2	0	0	0	0
1997–98	Neftekhimik–2 Nizhnekamsk	RUS.3	2	1	0	1	2	—	—	—	—	—
1998–99	Neftekhimik Nizhnekamsk	RSL	40	6	7	13	44	3	0	0	0	4
1998–99	Neftekhimik–2 Nizhnekamsk	RUS.3	1	0	1	1	0	—	—	—	—	—
1999–2000	HK Voronezh	RUS.2	38	22	12	34	113	—	—	—	—	—
1999–2000	Vityaz Podolsk	RUS.2	—	—	—	—	—	12	1	2	3	16
2000–01	Krylia Sovetov Moscow	RUS.2	28	12	4	16	34	14	5	2	7	10
2000–01	Krylia Sovetov–2 Moscow	RUS.3	2	3	1	4	0	—	—	—	—	—
2001–02	Krylia Sovetov Moscow	RSL	43	4	5	9	84	3	0	0	0	32
2002–03	Krylia Sovetov Moscow	RSL	42	5	5	10	85	—	—	—	—	—
2002–03	Krylia Sovetov–2 Moscow	RUS.3	2	1	2	3	4	—	—	—	—	—
2002–03	Barvinok Kharkiv	UKR	3	2	3	5	2	—	—	—	—	—
2003–04	Amur Khabarovsk	RSL	56	9	6	15	73	—	—	—	—	—
2004–05	Sokil Kyiv	BLR	39	22	14	36	30	11	5	4	9	53
2004–05	Sokil Kyiv	UKR	—	—	—	—	—	2	3	2	5	2
2005–06	Keramin Minsk	BLR	50	18	14	32	116	4	2	1	3	36
2006–07	Keramin Minsk	BLR	49	23	32	55	99	10	0	2	2	18
2007–08	Keramin Minsk	BLR	51	26	31	57	60	10	3	7	10	0
2008–09	Sokil Kyiv	RUS.2	39	16	13	29	36	6	1	2	3	2
2008–09	Sokil–2 Kyiv	UKR	—	—	—	—	—	3	2	2	4	10
2009–10	Sokil Kyiv	BLR	48	14	34	48	46	8	4	4	8	10
2010–11	Sokil Kyiv	BLR	54	15	26	41	95	3	0	1	1	2
2010–11	Sokil–2 Kyiv	UKR	3	1	4	5	4	—	—	—	—	—
2011–12	Berkut Kyiv	UKR	41	22	28	50	55	—	—	—	—	—
2012–13	Berkut Kyiv	UKR	31	6	12	18	36	—	—	—	—	—
2013–14	HC Kompanion–Naftogaz	UKR	16	17	4	21	18	7	3	5	8	0
2014–15	Vityaz Kharkiv	UKR	5	1	3	4	0	1	0	1	1
2015–16	Vityaz Kharkiv	UKR	40	33	28	61	66	3	1	0	1	6
2016–17	Vityaz Kharkiv	UKR	37	6	7	13	48	—	—	—	—	—
RSL totals			226	32	35	67	334	8	0	0	0	36
UKR totals			176	88	89	177	229	16	10	9	19	18
BLR totals			291	118	151	269	446	46	14	19	33	119

=== International ===
Year	Team	Event	GP	G	A	Pts	PIM
1994	Ukraine	EJC C	6	6	4	10	6
1995	Ukraine	WJC	7	1	1	2	31
1996	Ukraine	WJC	6	0	1	1	24
1997	Ukraine	WC C	5	3	0	3	10
1998	Ukraine	WC B	7	1	3	4	6
1999	Ukraine	WC	3	0	0	0	4
1999	Ukraine	WC Q	3	0	0	0	0
2001	Ukraine	OGQ	3	0	0	0	2
2001	Ukraine	WC	6	0	1	1	2
2002	Ukraine	OG	4	0	3	3	8
2002	Ukraine	WC	6	2	0	2	4
2003	Ukraine	WC	6	1	1	2	10
2004	Ukraine	WC	6	1	1	2	0
2005	Ukraine	OGQ	3	1	1	2	0
2005	Ukraine	WC	6	0	0	0	4
2006	Ukraine	WC	6	1	0	1	2
2007	Ukraine	WC	6	2	1	3	0
2008	Ukraine	WC D1	5	2	0	2	6
2009	Ukraine	OGQ	3	0	2	2	4
2009	Ukraine	WC D1	5	0	2	2	2
2010	Ukraine	WC D1	5	1	4	5	4
Junior totals			19	7	6	13	61
Senior totals			88	15	19	34	68
