= 2005–06 Ukrainian Hockey Championship =

- League: Ukrainian Hockey Championship
- Sport: Ice hockey
- Number of teams: 13

Regular season
- Regular season winners: HC Berkut

Playoffs
- Finals champions: HC Sokil Kyiv
- Runners-up: HC Berkut

Ukrainian Hockey Championship seasons
- ← 2004–05 2006–07 →

The 2005–06 Ukrainian Hockey League season was the 13th season of the Ukrainian Hockey League, the top level of ice hockey in Ukraine. 13 teams participated in the league, and HC Sokil Kyiv won the championship.

== First round ==
=== Division A ===
| | Club | GP | W | OTW | T | OTL | L | GF:GA | Pts |
|---|---|---|---|---|---|---|---|---|---|
| 1. | HC Berkut | 20 | 20 | 0 | 0 | 0 | 0 | 226:30 | 60 |
| 2. | HK Dniprovski Vovky | 20 | 13 | 0 | 0 | 0 | 7 | 145:50 | 39 |
| 3. | HK Kyiv | 20 | 12 | 0 | 0 | 0 | 8 | 100:51 | 36 |
| 4. | HK ATEK Kyiv | 20 | 11 | 0 | 0 | 0 | 9 | 83:74 | 33 |
| 5. | SDYuShOR Sokil-89 Kyiv | 20 | 3 | 0 | 0 | 0 | 17 | 25:125 | 9 |
| 6. | SDYuShOR Sokil-90 Kyiv | 20 | 1 | 0 | 0 | 0 | 19 | 12:271 | 3 |

=== Division B ===
==== Group A ====
| | Club | GP | W | OTW | T | OTL | L | GF:GA | Pts |
|---|---|---|---|---|---|---|---|---|---|
| 1. | SDYuShOR Kharkiv | 2 | 2 | 0 | 0 | 0 | 0 | 42:5 | 6 |
| 2. | Patriot Vinnitsya | 2 | 1 | 0 | 0 | 0 | 1 | 15:21 | 3 |
| 3. | HK Sumski Vorony | 2 | 0 | 0 | 0 | 0 | 2 | 6:37 | 0 |

==== Group B ====
| | Club | GP | W | OTW | T | OTL | L | GF:GA | Pts |
|---|---|---|---|---|---|---|---|---|---|
| 1. | HC Donbass | 2 | 2 | 0 | 0 | 0 | 0 | 20:3 | 6 |
| 2. | HK Meteor Dnipropetrovsk | 2 | 1 | 0 | 0 | 0 | 1 | 11:5 | 3 |
| 3. | HK Dnipro Kherson | 2 | 0 | 0 | 0 | 0 | 2 | 4:27 | 0 |

==== Placing round ====
===== 5th place =====
- HK Dnipro Kherson - HK Sumski Worony 13:5

===== 3rd place =====
- HK Meteor Dnipropetrovsk - Patriot Vinnitsya 5:3

===== Final =====
- SDYuShOR Kharkiv - HC Donbass 1:2

== Playoffs ==
=== Pre-Playoffs ===
- HK ATEK Kyiv - HC Donbass 5:4, 2:1

=== Semifinals ===
- HK Dniprovski Vovky - HK ATEK Kyiv 9:3, 5:2
- HC Berkut - HK ATEK Kyiv 12:5, +:-

=== Qualification ===
- HC Berkut - HK Dniprovski Vovky 4:0, 5:3

=== Final ===
- HC Sokil Kyiv - HC Berkut 1:4, 4:0, 5:1
