= Andriy Sryubko =

Ukrainian ice hockey player

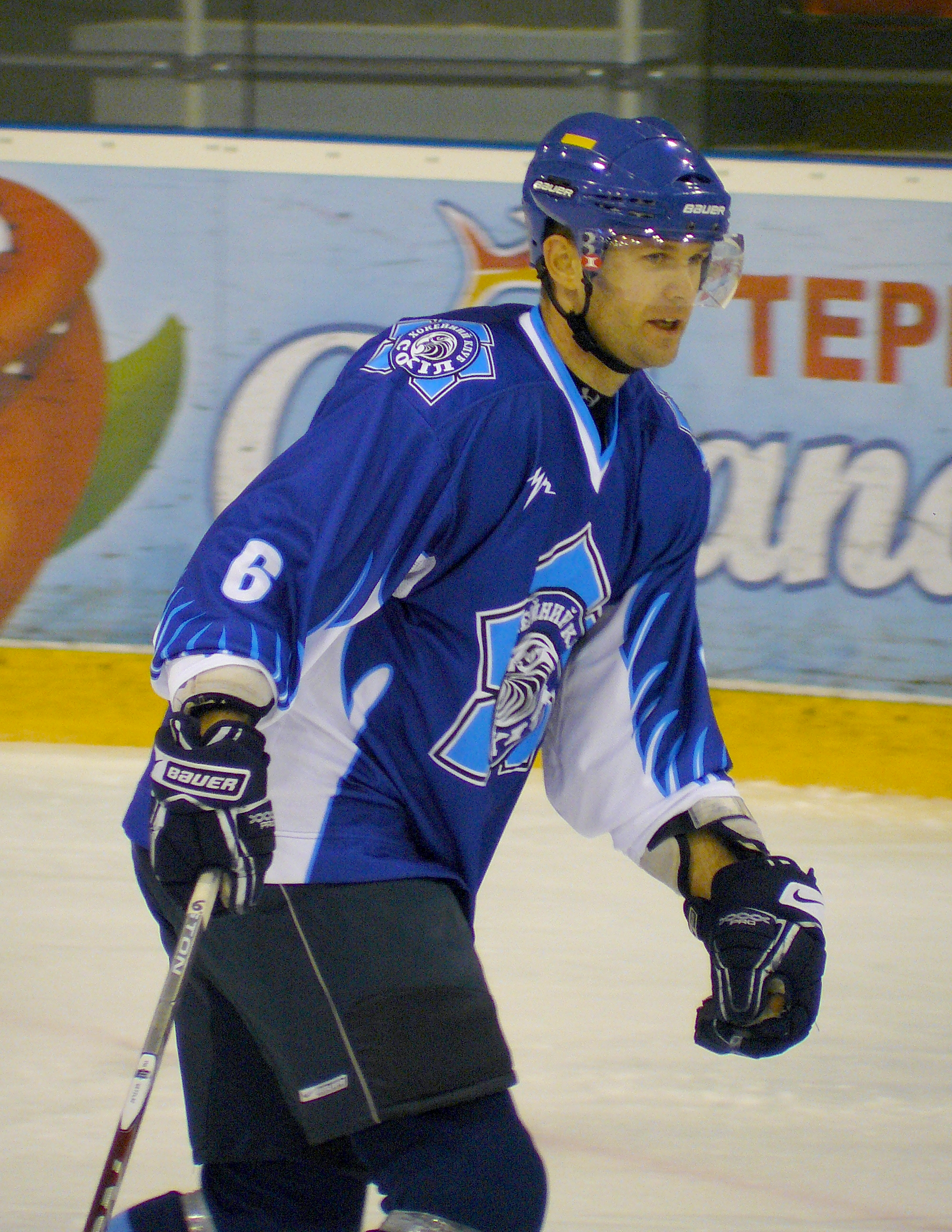
- Born: October 21, 1975 (age 49); Kyiv, Ukrainian SSR, Soviet Union
- Height: 6 ft 3 in (191 cm)
- Weight: 212 lb (96 kg; 15 st 2 lb)
- Position: Defenceman
- Shot: Left
- Played for: HC Kuban; Molot-Prikamye Perm; Sokil Kyiv; MHC Dmitrov; Torpedo Nizhny Novgorod; THK Tver; HC MVD; Amur Khabarovsk; Syracuse Crunch; Grand Rapids Griffins; Utah Grizzlies; Port Huron Border Cats; Las Vegas Thunder; Fort Wayne Komets; Toledo Storm
- National team: Ukraine
- Playing career: 1996–2013

Andriy Vasilovich Sryubko (Ukrainian: Андрій Васильович Срюбко; born 21 October 1975), is a Ukrainian retired professional ice hockey player. He played for multiple teams during a career that lasted from 1996 until 2013. He also played internationally for the Ukrainian national team at several World Championships, as well as the 2002 Winter Olympics.

== Career statistics ==
=== Regular season and playoffs ===
| | | | Regular season | | | | | Playoffs |
| Season | Team | League | GP | G | A | Pts | PIM | GP | G | A | Pts | PIM |
|---|---|---|---|---|---|---|---|---|---|---|---|---|
| 1993–94 | Sokil Kyiv | RUS | 3 | 0 | 0 | 0 | 4 | — | — | — | — | — |
| 1993–94 | ShVSM Kyiv | RUS.3 | 28 | 1 | 1 | 2 | 24 | — | — | — | — | — |
| 1994–95 | Kamloops Blazers | WHL | 1 | 0 | 0 | 0 | 0 | — | — | — | — | — |
| 1994–95 | Langley Thunder | BCHL | 34 | 3 | 12 | 15 | 64 | — | — | — | — | — |
| 1995–96 | Langley Thunder | BCHL | 49 | 6 | 23 | 29 | 121 | — | — | — | — | — |
| 1996–97 | Toledo Storm | ECHL | 62 | 0 | 8 | 8 | 238 | 5 | 0 | 0 | 0 | 4 |
| 1997–98 | Toledo Storm | ECHL | 50 | 1 | 12 | 13 | 165 | 7 | 0 | 0 | 0 | 8 |
| 1997–98 | Las Vegas Thunder | IHL | 13 | 0 | 0 | 0 | 57 | — | — | — | — | — |
| 1998–99 | Port Huron Border Cats | UHL | 22 | 2 | 2 | 4 | 78 | 2 | 0 | 0 | 0 | 4 |
| 1998–99 | Fort Wayne Komets | IHL | 1 | 0 | 0 | 0 | 0 | — | — | — | — | — |
| 1998–99 | Las Vegas Thunder | IHL | 51 | 0 | 8 | 8 | 164 | — | — | — | — | — |
| 1999–2000 | Port Huron Border Cats | UHL | 2 | 0 | 0 | 0 | 7 | — | — | — | — | — |
| 1999–2000 | Utah Grizzlies | IHL | 5 | 1 | 1 | 2 | 32 | — | — | — | — | — |
| 1999–2000 | Grand Rapids Griffins | IHL | 28 | 0 | 1 | 1 | 109 | 2 | 0 | 0 | 0 | 9 |
| 2000–01 | Syracuse Crunch | AHL | 70 | 1 | 6 | 7 | 169 | 5 | 0 | 0 | 0 | 0 |
| 2001–02 | Syracuse Crunch | AHL | 58 | 0 | 10 | 10 | 181 | 9 | 0 | 0 | 0 | 18 |
| 2002–03 | Molot–Prikamye Perm | RSL | 17 | 2 | 0 | 2 | 63 | — | — | — | — | — |
| 2002–03 | Sokil Kyiv | EEHL | 15 | 2 | 1 | 3 | 24 | — | — | — | — | — |
| 2003–04 | Sokil Kyiv | EEHL | 6 | 0 | 2 | 2 | 6 | — | — | — | — | — |
| 2003–04 | Amur Khabarovsk | RSL | 24 | 0 | 1 | 1 | 43 | — | — | — | — | — |
| 2004–05 | HC MVD | RUS.2 | 31 | 2 | 4 | 6 | 49 | 9 | 0 | 1 | 1 | 112 |
| 2004–05 | HK MVD–THK Tver | RUS.3 | 1 | 0 | 0 | 0 | 4 | — | — | — | — | — |
| 2005–06 | HC MVD | RSL | 31 | 1 | 0 | 1 | 105 | — | — | — | — | — |
| 2005–06 | HK MVD–THK Tver | RUS.3 | 3 | 0 | 1 | 1 | 2 | — | — | — | — | — |
| 2005–06 | Sokil Kyiv | BLR | — | — | — | — | — | 3 | 0 | 1 | 1 | 8 |
| 2006–07 | Torpedo Nizhny Novgorod | RUS.2 | 20 | 2 | 5 | 7 | 75 | — | — | — | — | — |
| 2006–07 | HK Dmitrov | RUS.2 | 19 | 3 | 5 | 8 | 76 | 14 | 0 | 3 | 3 | 10 |
| 2007–08 | Sokil Kyiv | RUS.2 | 60 | 2 | 14 | 16 | 122 | 3 | 0 | 3 | 3 | 2 |
| 2008–09 | Sokil Kyiv | RUS.2 | 62 | 3 | 19 | 22 | 161 | 5 | 1 | 0 | 1 | 6 |
| 2008–09 | Sokil–2 Kyiv | UKR | — | — | — | — | — | 4 | 0 | 4 | 4 | 8 |
| 2009–10 | Sokil Kyiv | BLR | 47 | 10 | 12 | 22 | 76 | 7 | 0 | 1 | 1 | 22 |
| 2010–11 | Sokil Kyiv | BLR | 49 | 6 | 11 | 17 | 137 | 2 | 0 | 0 | 0 | 39 |
| 2010–11 | Sokil–2 Kyiv | UKR | 3 | 2 | 1 | 3 | 4 | — | — | — | — | — |
| 2011–12 | Molot–Prikamye Perm | VHL | 43 | 2 | 8 | 10 | 111 | 3 | 0 | 0 | 0 | 0 |
| 2012–13 | HC Kuban | VHL | 44 | 2 | 7 | 9 | 90 | — | — | — | — | — |
| IHL totals | | | 98 | 1 | 10 | 11 | 362 | 2 | 0 | 0 | 0 | 9 |
| AHL totals | | | 128 | 1 | 16 | 17 | 350 | 34 | 1 | 7 | 8 | 130 |
| RUS.2/VHL totals | | | 279 | 16 | 62 | 78 | 684 | 14 | 0 | 0 | 0 | 18 |

=== International ===
| Year | Team | Event | GP | G | A | Pts | PIM |
|---|---|---|---|---|---|---|---|
| 1994 | Ukraine | WJC B | 7 | 0 | 0 | 0 | 0 |
| 2001 | Ukraine | WC | 5 | 0 | 0 | 0 | 0 |
| 2002 | Ukraine | OG | 4 | 0 | 1 | 1 | 6 |
| 2003 | Ukraine | WC | 6 | 0 | 0 | 0 | 4 |
| 2004 | Ukraine | WC | 5 | 0 | 0 | 0 | 4 |
| 2005 | Ukraine | WC | 6 | 1 | 0 | 1 | 4 |
| 2006 | Ukraine | WC | 6 | 0 | 1 | 1 | 12 |
| 2007 | Ukraine | WC | 6 | 0 | 0 | 0 | 6 |
| 2008 | Ukraine | WC D1 | 5 | 1 | 3 | 4 | 2 |
| 2009 | Ukraine | OGQ | 3 | 1 | 0 | 1 | 0 |
| 2009 | Ukraine | WC D1 | 5 | 2 | 1 | 3 | 4 |
| 2010 | Ukraine | WC D1 | 5 | 2 | 1 | 3 | 0 |
| 2011 | Ukraine | WC D1 | 5 | 0 | 2 | 2 | 4 |
| Senior totals | | | 61 | 7 | 9 | 16 | 46 |
