= Roman Malov =

Russian ice hockey player

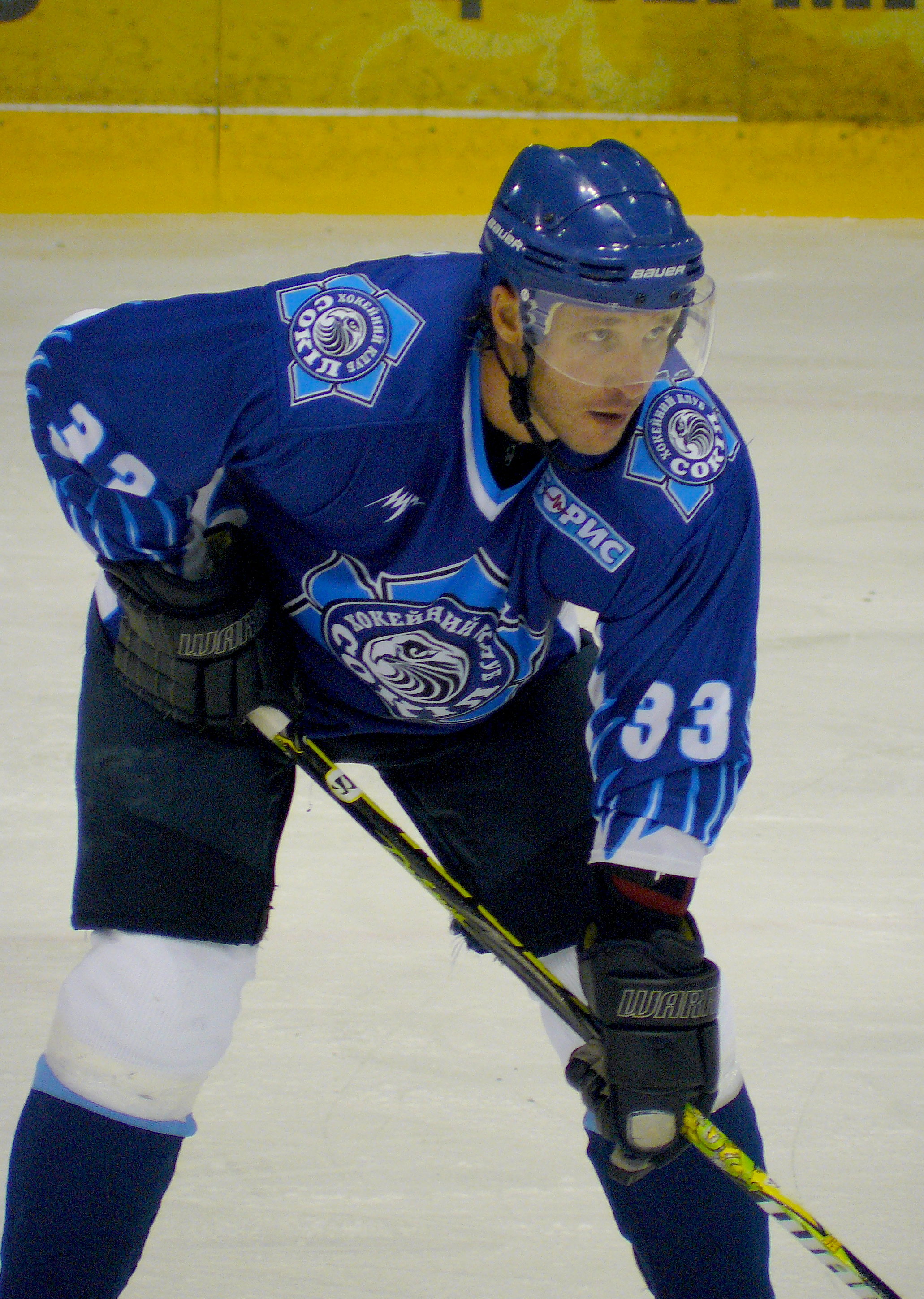
- Born: September 24, 1977 (age 48) Novocheboksarsk, Russia, U.S.S.R.
- Height: 6 ft 2 in (188 cm)
- Weight: 196 lb (89 kg; 14 st 0 lb)
- Position: Forward
- Shot: Left
- Played for: Stroitel Karaganda; Avangard Omsk; HC Spartak Moscow; Torpedo Nizhny Novgorod; Severstal Cherepovets; Traktor Chelyabinsk; Sokil Kiev; HK Kompanion Kiev; HC Sarov
- NHL draft: 187th overall, 1996; Philadelphia Flyers
- Playing career: 1994–2014

Roman Malov (born September 24, 1977) is a former Russian professional ice hockey player who played in the Russian Superleague (RSL). Malov was drafted in the seventh round of the 1996 NHL entry draft by the Philadelphia Flyers and he played one season of junior hockey in North America for the Kingston Frontenacs of the Ontario Hockey League. He played nine seasons in the RSL for Stroitel Karaganda, Avangard Omsk, HC Spartak Moscow, Torpedo Nizhny Novgorod, Severstal Cherepovets, and Traktor Chelyabinsk.
