= 2004–05 Ukrainian Hockey Championship =

- League: Ukrainian Hockey Championship
- Sport: Ice hockey
- Number of teams: 12

Regular season
- Regular season winners: HK Dniprovski Vovky

Playoffs
- Finals champions: HC Sokil Kyiv
- Runners-up: HK Dniprovski Vovky

Ukrainian Hockey Championship seasons
- ← 2003–04 2005–06 →

The 2004–05 Ukrainian Hockey League season was the 12th season of the Ukrainian Hockey League, the top level of ice hockey in Ukraine. 12 teams participated in the league, and HC Sokil Kyiv won the championship.

== First round ==
=== Division A ===
	Club	GP	W	OTW	T	OTL	L	GF:GA	Pts
1.	HK Dniprovski Vovky	21	18	0	0	1	2	109:31	54
2.	HK Kyiv	21	13	1	1	0	6	127:70	41
3.	HK ATEK Kyiv	20	10	1	1	0	8	98:69	33
4.	Sdyushor Kharkiv	20	6	0	0	1	13	68:95	19
5.	Druzhba-78 Kharkiv	21	5	1	0	1	14	42:71	17
6.	HC Sokil Kyiv II	20	0	0	0	1	19	32:180	0

=== Division B ===
==== Group A ====
- Khimik Sievierodonetsk - Dnipro-Spartak Kherson 4:4/4:3 OT

==== Group B ====
	Club	GP	W	OTW	T	OTL	L	GF:GA	Pts
1.	HC Berkut	2	1	0	1	0	0	13:3	3
2.	Politekhnik Kyiv	2	1	0	1	0	0	7:5	3
3.	HK Donetsk	2	0	0	0	0	2	4:16	0

==== Placing round ====
===== 3rd place =====
- Dnipro-Spartak Kherson - Politekhnik Kyiv 3:21

===== Final =====
- Khimik Sievierodonetsk - HC Berkut 1:3

== Playoffs ==
=== Pre-Playoffs ===
- Sdyushor Kharkiv - HC Berkut 2:0

=== Semifinals ===
- HK Kyiv - HK ATEK Kyiv 2:1
- Sdyushor Kharkiv - HK Dniprovski Vovky 0:2

=== Qualification ===
- HK Dniprovski Vovky - HK Kyiv 2:0

=== Final ===
- HC Sokil Kyiv - HK Dniprovski Vovky 2:0
