= Igor Chibirev =

Ukrainian ice hockey player

- Born: April 19, 1968 (age 58) Penza, Russian SFSR, Soviet Union
- Height: 6 ft 0 in (183 cm)
- Weight: 180 lb (82 kg; 12 st 12 lb)
- Position: Centre
- Shot: Left
- Played for: Hartford Whalers
- National team: Ukraine
- NHL draft: 266th overall, 1993; Hartford Whalers
- Playing career: 1986–2002

Ihor Viktorovich "Igor" Chibirev (Ukrainian: Ігор Вікторович Чибирєв; born April 19, 1968) is a Ukrainian retired ice hockey centre. He played in the National Hockey League with the Hartford Whalers.

== Career ==
Chibirev began his career in the Vysshaya Liga for SKA Kalinin before moving to the Soviet Hockey League for CSKA Moscow. After a spell in the International Hockey League with the Fort Wayne Komets, Chibirev was drafted 266th overall by the Hartford Whalers in the 1993 NHL entry draft. Over two seasons, he played 45 regular season games for the Whalers, scoring seven goals and 12 assists for 19 points. Three of those goals came in an 8–4 Hartford road win over the Pittsburgh Penguins on April 5, 1995. In 1995, he moved to Switzerland's Nationalliga A and signed with HC Ambrì-Piotta. He spent three seasons with the team, including a short spell in Austria with EC KAC. Chibirev later moved to HC Fribourg-Gottéron for one season before joining the Hannover Scorpions of Germany's Deutsche Eishockey Liga, where he remained until his retirement in 2002. He represented the Ukraine national ice hockey team at the 2002 Winter Olympics.

== Career statistics ==
=== Regular season and playoffs ===
| | | | Regular season | | | | | Playoffs |
| Season | Team | League | GP | G | A | Pts | PIM | GP | G | A | Pts | PIM |
|---|---|---|---|---|---|---|---|---|---|---|---|---|
| 1984–85 | ShVSM Kyiv | URS–3 | — | 6 | 1 | 7 | — | — | — | — | — | — |
| 1986–87 | SKA MVO Kalinin | URS–2 | 6 | 0 | 1 | 1 | 2 | — | — | — | — | — |
| 1987–88 | CSKA Moscow | URS | 28 | 5 | 1 | 6 | 8 | — | — | — | — | — |
| 1988–89 | CSKA Moscow | URS | 34 | 7 | 9 | 16 | 16 | — | — | — | — | — |
| 1989–90 | CSKA Moscow | URS | 48 | 8 | 2 | 10 | 12 | — | — | — | — | — |
| 1990–91 | CSKA Moscow | URS | 40 | 10 | 9 | 19 | 4 | — | — | — | — | — |
| 1991–92 | CSKA Moscow | CIS | 30 | 16 | 16 | 32 | 12 | 8 | 5 | 1 | 6 | 24 |
| 1991–92 | CSKA–2 Moscow | CIS–3 | 1 | 0 | 0 | 0 | 0 | — | — | — | — | — |
| 1992–93 | Fort Wayne Komets | IHL | 60 | 33 | 36 | 69 | 2 | 12 | 7 | 13 | 20 | 2 |
| 1993–94 | Hartford Whalers | NHL | 37 | 4 | 11 | 15 | 2 | — | — | — | — | — |
| 1993–94 | Springfield Indians | AHL | 36 | 28 | 23 | 51 | 4 | — | — | — | — | — |
| 1994–95 | Fort Wayne Komets | IHL | 56 | 34 | 28 | 62 | 10 | — | — | — | — | — |
| 1994–95 | Hartford Whalers | NHL | 8 | 3 | 1 | 4 | 0 | — | — | — | — | — |
| 1995–96 | HC Ambrì–Piotta | NDA | 35 | 36 | 33 | 69 | 12 | 6 | 5 | 6 | 11 | 4 |
| 1996–97 | HC Ambrì–Piotta | NDA | 29 | 15 | 26 | 41 | 2 | — | — | — | — | — |
| 1996–97 | EC KAC | AUT | 8 | 2 | 5 | 7 | 2 | — | — | — | — | — |
| 1997–98 | HC Ambrì–Piotta | NDA | 40 | 35 | 41 | 76 | 24 | 13 | 9 | 14 | 23 | 8 |
| 1998–99 | HC Fribourg–Gottéron | NDA | 32 | 13 | 14 | 27 | 25 | — | — | — | — | — |
| 1999–00 | Hannover Scorpions | DEL | 52 | 25 | 25 | 50 | 24 | — | — | — | — | — |
| 2000–01 | Hannover Scorpions | DEL | 58 | 25 | 34 | 59 | 6 | 6 | 2 | 2 | 4 | 4 |
| 2001–02 | Hannover Scorpions | DEL | 48 | 10 | 19 | 29 | 4 | — | — | — | — | — |
| URS/CIS totals | | | 178 | 46 | 37 | 83 | 52 | 8 | 5 | 1 | 6 | 24 |
| NHL totals | | | 45 | 7 | 12 | 19 | 2 | — | — | — | — | — |
| NDA totals | | | 136 | 99 | 114 | 213 | 63 | 19 | 14 | 20 | 34 | 12 |

=== International ===
| Year | Team | Event | GP | G | A | Pts | PIM |
|---|---|---|---|---|---|---|---|
| 2002 | Ukraine | OG | 4 | 2 | 1 | 3 | 2 |
| Senior totals | | | 4 | 2 | 1 | 3 | 2 |
