= 2002–03 Ukrainian Hockey Championship =

- League: Ukrainian Hockey Championship
- Sport: Ice hockey
- Number of teams: 14

Regular season
- Regular season winners: HK Kyiv

Playoffs
- Finals champions: HC Sokil Kyiv
- Runners-up: Barvinok Kharkiv

Ukrainian Hockey Championship seasons
- ← 2001–02 2003–04 →

The 2002–03 Ukrainian Hockey League season was the 10th season of the Ukrainian Hockey League. Fourteen teams participated in the league, and HC Sokil Kyiv won the championship.

== First round ==
=== Division A ===
	Club	GP	W	T	L	GF:GA	Pts
1.	HK Kyiv	16	12	0	4	71:42	24
2.	HK ATEK Kyiv	16	7	3	6	58:57	17
3.	Barvinok Kharkiv	16	6	2	8	53:42	14
4.	Druzhba-78 Kharkiv	16	5	3	8	55:65	13
5.	Politekhnik Kyiv	14	3	2	9	55:86	12

=== Division B ===
==== Group A ====
	Club	Pts
1.	Khimik Sievierodonetsk	6
2.	HK Smila	3
3.	Meteor Dnipropetrovsk II	2
4.	Gladiator Lviv	2

==== Group B ====
	Club	Pts
1.	Meteor Dnipropetrovsk	6
2.	Dnipro Kherson	4
3.	Soniachna Dolyna Odesa	2
4.	Sumski Vorony Sumy	0

==== Placing round ====
===== 7th place =====
- Gladiator Lviv - Sumski Vorony Sumy 22:3

===== 5th place =====
- Meteor Dnipropetrovsk II - Soniachna Dolyna Odesa

===== 3rd place =====
- HK Dnipro Kherson - HK Smila 12:6

===== Final =====
- Khimik Severdonetsk - Meteor Dnipropetrovsk 8:5

== Playoffs ==
=== Pre-Playoffs ===
- Barvinok Kharkiv - Khimik Severdonetsk 2:0

=== Semifinals ===
- HK ATEK Kyiv - Druzhba-78 Kharkiv 2:0
- HK Kyiv - Barvinok Kharkiv 1:2

=== Qualification ===
- HK ATEK Kyiv - Barvinok Kharkiv 1:2

=== Final ===
- HC Sokil Kyiv - Barvinok Kharkiv 2:0
