= Oleksandr Ivanyshyn =

Ukrainian bobsledder

Personal information
- Nationality: Ukrainian
- Born: 23 September 1974 (age 50)

Sport
- Sport: Bobsleigh

Oleksandr Ivanyshyn (born 23 September 1974) is a Ukrainian bobsledder. He competed in the two man and the four man events at the 2002 Winter Olympics.
