= 2007–08 Ukrainian Hockey Championship =

- League: Ukrainian Hockey Championship
- Sport: Ice hockey
- Teams: 6

Regular season
- Regular season winners: HC Sokil Kyiv II

Playoffs
- Finals champions: HC Sokil Kyiv II
- Runners-up: Bilyi Bars Brovary

Ukrainian Hockey Championship seasons
- ← 2006–07 2008–09 →

The 2007–08 Ukrainian Hockey League season was the 15th season of the Ukrainian Hockey League, the top level of ice hockey in Ukraine. Six teams participated in the league, and HC Sokil Kyiv II won the championship.

== Regular season ==
	Club	GP	W	OTW	T	OTL	L	GF:GA	Pts
1.	HC Sokil Kyiv II	30	24	1	2	0	3	173:65	76
2.	Bilyi Bars Brovary	30	19	1	1	0	9	136:92	60
3.	HK Kompanion Kyiv	30	16	1	2	1	10	115:103	53
4.	HC Kharkiv	30	13	1	1	0	15	110:90	42
5.	HK ATEK Kyiv	30	10	0	2	3	15	81:95	35
6.	HK Dniprovski Vovky	30	0	0	0	0	30	47:217	0

== Playoffs ==
Semifinals

- Bilyi Bars Brovary - HK Companion Kyiv 2–0 on series
- HC Sokil Kyiv II - HC Kharkiv 2–0 on series

Final

- HC Sokil Kyiv II - Bilyi Bars Brovary 2–0 on series

3rd place

- HC Kharkiv - HK Companion Kyiv 2–1 on series
