= Serhiy Klymentiev =

Ukrainian ice hockey player

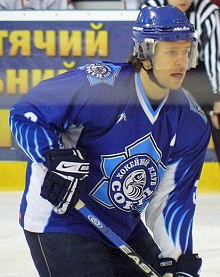
- Klymentiev in 2010
- Born: April 5, 1975 (age 51) Kyiv, Ukrainian SSR, Soviet Union
- Height: 6 ft 1 in (185 cm)
- Weight: 192 lb (87 kg; 13 st 10 lb)
- Position: Defence
- Shot: Left
- BLR team Former teams: Sokil Kyiv; Salavat Yulaev Ufa; Torpedo Nizhny Novgorod; Avangard Omsk; Ak Bars Kazan; Metallurg Magnitogorsk; HC MVD Moscow Oblast
- National team: Ukraine
- NHL draft: 121st overall, 1994; Buffalo Sabres
- Playing career: 1994–2013

Serhiy Volodomyrovych Klymentiev (Ukrainian: Сергій Володимирович Климентьєв; born April 5, 1975) is a Ukrainian former professional ice hockey defenceman.

== Career ==
Klymentiev was named best defenceman at the C Pool of the 1993 World Junior Ice Hockey Championships held in Odense, Denmark. He played junior hockey for the Medicine Hat Tigers in the WHL during the 1993–1994 and 1994–1995 seasons. He was drafted by the Buffalo Sabres 121st overall in the 1994 NHL entry draft and spent 3 seasons with their American Hockey League affiliate the Rochester Americans. In 1998, he signed with the Philadelphia Flyers and was once more sent to the AHL, suiting up for the Philadelphia Phantoms. He was traded to the Nashville Predators for cash in the same season, playing for the Milwaukee Admirals their International Hockey League affiliate. He returned to Russia in 1999 having never played in the National Hockey League. He only ever returned to North America once, where he played seven games for the IHL's Houston Aeros. He retired in 2013 and as of that time works as an assistant coach of Sokil Kyiv.

== Career statistics ==
=== Regular season and playoffs ===
| | | | Regular season | | | | | Playoffs |
| Season | Team | League | GP | G | A | Pts | PIM | GP | G | A | Pts | PIM |
|---|---|---|---|---|---|---|---|---|---|---|---|---|
| 1991–92 | ShVSM Kyiv | CIS.3 | 8 | 1 | 1 | 2 | 4 | — | — | — | — | — |
| 1992–93 | Sokil Kyiv | RUS | 3 | 0 | 0 | 0 | 4 | 1 | 0 | 0 | 0 | 0 |
| 1992–93 | Sokil–2 Kyiv | RUS.2 | 36 | 1 | 4 | 5 | 40 | — | — | — | — | — |
| 1993–94 | Medicine Hat Tigers | WHL | 72 | 16 | 26 | 42 | 165 | 3 | 0 | 0 | 0 | 4 |
| 1994–95 | Medicine Hat Tigers | WHL | 71 | 19 | 45 | 64 | 146 | 5 | 4 | 2 | 6 | 14 |
| 1994–95 | Rochester Americans | AHL | 7 | 0 | 0 | 0 | 8 | 1 | 0 | 0 | 0 | 0 |
| 1995–96 | Rochester Americans | AHL | 70 | 7 | 29 | 36 | 74 | 19 | 2 | 8 | 10 | 16 |
| 1996–97 | Rochester Americans | AHL | 77 | 14 | 28 | 42 | 114 | 10 | 1 | 4 | 5 | 28 |
| 1997–98 | Rochester Americans | AHL | 57 | 4 | 22 | 26 | 94 | — | — | — | — | — |
| 1998–99 | Philadelphia Phantoms | AHL | 43 | 5 | 12 | 17 | 99 | — | — | — | — | — |
| 1998–99 | Milwaukee Admirals | IHL | 35 | 4 | 11 | 15 | 59 | 2 | 0 | 0 | 0 | 6 |
| 1999–2000 | Ak Bars Kazan | RSL | 33 | 5 | 7 | 12 | 52 | 15 | 2 | 2 | 4 | 30 |
| 2000–01 | Houston Aeros | IHL | 7 | 0 | 0 | 0 | 6 | — | — | — | — | — |
| 2000–01 | Metallurg Magnitogorsk | RSL | 20 | 1 | 3 | 4 | 36 | 12 | 1 | 9 | 10 | 41 |
| 2000–01 | Metallurg–2 Magnitogorsk | RUS.3 | 2 | 0 | 0 | 0 | 2 | — | — | — | — | — |
| 2001–02 | Metallurg Magnitogorsk | RSL | 47 | 6 | 24 | 30 | 46 | 9 | 1 | 3 | 4 | 14 |
| 2002–03 | Metallurg Magnitogorsk | RSL | 45 | 4 | 10 | 14 | 88 | 2 | 0 | 0 | 0 | 6 |
| 2003–04 | Metallurg Magnitogorsk | RSL | 59 | 2 | 19 | 21 | 106 | 14 | 0 | 5 | 5 | 8 |
| 2004–05 | Ak Bars Kazan | RSL | 40 | 2 | 2 | 4 | 32 | — | — | — | — | — |
| 2004–05 | Ak Bars–2 Kazan | RUS.3 | 5 | 3 | 4 | 7 | 2 | — | — | — | — | — |
| 2005–06 | Ak Bars Kazan | RSL | 40 | 0 | 1 | 1 | 71 | 13 | 1 | 0 | 1 | 24 |
| 2006–07 | HC MVD | RSL | 54 | 12 | 27 | 39 | 116 | 3 | 0 | 1 | 1 | 6 |
| 2007–08 | Avangard Omsk | RSL | 51 | 3 | 9 | 12 | 87 | 3 | 0 | 0 | 0 | 8 |
| 2008–09 | Torpedo Nizhny Novgorod | KHL | 19 | 0 | 1 | 1 | 28 | — | — | — | — | — |
| 2008–09 | Salavat Yulaev Ufa | KHL | 20 | 2 | 3 | 5 | 40 | 1 | 0 | 0 | 0 | 2 |
| 2009–10 | Sokol Kyiv | BLR | 48 | 5 | 21 | 26 | 141 | 8 | 0 | 2 | 2 | 18 |
| 2010–11 | Sokol Kyiv | BLR | 50 | 11 | 23 | 34 | 108 | 2 | 0 | 2 | 2 | 4 |
| 2011–12 | Sokol Kyiv | UKR | 24 | 3 | 17 | 20 | 6 | — | — | — | — | — |
| 2012–13 | Sokol Kyiv | UKR | 25 | 1 | 3 | 4 | 28 | — | — | — | — | — |
| AHL totals | | | 254 | 30 | 91 | 121 | 389 | 30 | 3 | 12 | 15 | 44 |
| RSL totals | | | 389 | 35 | 102 | 137 | 634 | 71 | 5 | 20 | 25 | 137 |

=== International ===
| Year | Team | Event | GP | G | A | Pts | PIM |
|---|---|---|---|---|---|---|---|
| 1993 | Ukraine | WJC C | 4 | 2 | 4 | 6 | 6 |
| 1993 | Ukraine | EJC C | 4 | 2 | 2 | 4 | 14 |
| 1999 | Ukraine | WC | 3 | 1 | 1 | 2 | 6 |
| 1999 | Ukraine | WC Q | 3 | 0 | 0 | 0 | 6 |
| 2000 | Ukraine | WC | 6 | 0 | 1 | 1 | 8 |
| 2001 | Ukraine | OGQ | 3 | 0 | 2 | 2 | 6 |
| 2001 | Ukraine | WC | 6 | 1 | 2 | 3 | 20 |
| 2002 | Ukraine | OG | 4 | 0 | 1 | 1 | 8 |
| 2002 | Ukraine | WC | 6 | 1 | 3 | 4 | 16 |
| 2003 | Ukraine | WC | 6 | 0 | 2 | 2 | 10 |
| 2005 | Ukraine | WC | 6 | 1 | 0 | 1 | 6 |
| 2006 | Ukraine | WC | 5 | 0 | 0 | 0 | 26 |
| 2007 | Ukraine | WC | 6 | 1 | 1 | 2 | 46 |
| 2008 | Ukraine | WC D1 | 5 | 1 | 4 | 5 | 6 |
| 2009 | Ukraine | OGQ | 3 | 1 | 0 | 1 | 0 |
| 2009 | Ukraine | WC D1 | 5 | 2 | 1 | 3 | 8 |
| 2010 | Ukraine | WC D1 | 5 | 0 | 2 | 2 | 4 |
| 2011 | Ukraine | WC D1 | 5 | 1 | 2 | 3 | 6 |
| 2012 | Ukraine | WC D1A | 5 | 1 | 1 | 2 | 2 |
| 2013 | Ukraine | OGQ | 3 | 0 | 1 | 1 | 0 |
| Junior totals | | | 8 | 4 | 6 | 10 | 20 |
| Senior totals | | | 85 | 11 | 24 | 35 | 184 |
