= 2006–07 Ukrainian Hockey Championship =

- League: Ukrainian Hockey Championship
- Sport: Ice hockey
- Teams: 6

Regular season
- Champions: HK ATEK Kyiv
- Runners-up: HC Berkut

Ukrainian Hockey Championship seasons
- ← 2005–06 2007–08 →

The 2006–07 Ukrainian Hockey League season was the 15th season of the Ukrainian Hockey League, the top level of ice hockey in Ukraine. Six teams participated in the league, and HK ATEK Kyiv won the championship.

== Major League standings ==
| | Club | GP | W | OTW | T | OTL | L | GF:GA | Pts |
|---|---|---|---|---|---|---|---|---|---|
| 1. | HK ATEK Kyiv | 30 | 26 | 2 | 0 | 0 | 2 | 126:30 | 82 |
| 2. | HC Berkut | 30 | 23 | 0 | 0 | 1 | 6 | 145:50 | 70 |
| 3. | HC Sokil Kyiv | 30 | 15 | 0 | 1 | 0 | 14 | 100:51 | 46 |
| 4. | HK Kompanion Kyiv | 30 | 13 | 2 | 1 | 0 | 14 | 83:74 | 44 |
| 5. | HK Dniprovski Vovky | 30 | 7 | 0 | 1 | 1 | 21 | 25:125 | 23 |
| 6. | SDYuShOR Sokil | 30 | 0 | 0 | 1 | 2 | 27 | 12:273 | 3 |
