= 2002–03 EEHL season =

The 2002–03 Eastern European Hockey League season, was the eighth season of the Eastern European Hockey League, a multi-national ice hockey league. 16 teams participated in the league, 10 in Division 1, and six in Division 2. HK Keramin Minsk of Belarus won Division 1, and ASK Jelgava of Latvia won Division 2.

== Division 1 ==
Division 1
Pl.	Team	GP	W	OTW	OTL	L	Goals	Pkt.
1.	HK Keramin Minsk	36	23	4	2	7	136:84	79
2.	HK Homel	36	23	4	1	8	139:67	78
3.	HK Sokol Kiev	36	18	5	6	7	95:67	70
4.	HK Riga 2000	36	16	4	4	12	119:112	60
5.	HK Liepājas Metalurgs	36	17	2	2	15	107:93	57
6.	HK Khimvolokno Mogilev	36	15	6	4	13	100:99	57
7.	HK Neman Grodno	36	8	9	7	12	102:103	49
8.	Kapitan Stupino	36	9	2	4	21	83:110	35
9.	Polimir Novopolotsk	36	9	1	2	23	67:141	30
10.	HK Vitebsk	36	5	1	5	25	77:138	22

== Division 2 ==
Division 2
Pl.	Team	GP	W	OTW	OTL	L	Goals	Pkt.
1.	ASK Zemgale Jelgava	20	18	0	0	2	170:44	54
2.	SC Energija	18	11	1	1	5	158:68	36
3.	HK Kiev	20	11	1	0	6	106:58	35
4.	Stalkers Daugavpils	20	8	3	3	6	89:66	33
5.	HK Prizma Riga	18	2	1	2	13	59:147	10
6.	GKS Gdansk II	18	0	0	0	18	22:201	0
