= 2003–04 EEHL season =

The 2003–04 Eastern European Hockey League season, was the ninth and final season of the multi-national ice hockey league. Nine teams participated in Division A, Six teams participated in Division B, and seven teams participated in the EEHL Cup. HK Keramin Minsk won Division A, HK Vitebsk won Division B, and Titan Klin won the EEHL Cup.

== Division A ==
Division A
Pl.	Team	GP	W	OTW	OTL	L	Goals	Pkt.
1.	(Belarus) HK Keramin Minsk	30	23	0	1	6	125:59	70
2.	(Belarus) HK Homel	32	19	1	2	10	119:74	61
3.	(Belarus) HK Khimvolokno Mogilev	32	17	2	0	13	90:93	55
4.	(Ukraine) HK Sokol Kyiv	32	17	0	0	15	103:98	51
5.	(Russia) Titan Klin	30	14	2	0	14	104:92	45
6.	(Latvia) HK Liepājas Metalurgs	32	13	2	2	15	104:92	44
7.	(Belarus) HK Neman Grodno	32	13	1	0	19	95:111	41
8.	(Latvia) HK Riga 2000	32	9	2	0	21	79:118	31
9.	(Latvia) ASK/Ogre	32	5	0	1	26	71:140	16

== Division B ==
Division B
Pl.	Team	GP	W	OTW	OTL	L	Goals	Pkt.
1.	(Belarus) HK Vitebsk	20	15	0	0	5	166:49	45
2.	(Ukraine) HK Kyiv	20	14	0	1	5	82:63	43
3.	(Belarus) Junior Minsk	20	10	2	1	7	94:82	35
4.	(Belarus) HK Homel II	20	11	0	0	9	85:77	33
5.	(Latvia) HS Riga 85	20	4	0	0	16	48:133	12
6.	(Belarus) HK Khimvolokno Mogilev II	20	3	0	0	17	22:201	9

=== Playoffs ===
==== Semifinals ====
- Junior Minsk - HK Gomel 5–1, 6–2

==== Final ====
- Junior Minsk - HK Vitebsk 4–1, 2–4, 4–1

== EEHL Cup ==
EEHL Cup
Pl.	Team	GP	W	OTW	OTL	L	Goals	Pkt.
1.	(Russia) Titan Klin	12	9	0	0	3	38:27	27
2.	(Ukraine) HK Sokil Kyiv	12	5	3	1	3	35:22	23
3.	(Latvia) ASK/Ogre	12	6	1	1	4	46:40	21
4.	(Latvia) HK Liepājas Metalurgs	12	6	1	0	5	56:48	20
5.	(Latvia) HK Riga 2000	12	5	1	0	6	43:35	17
6.	(Poland) Stoczniowiec Gdansk	12	4	0	0	8	25:30	12
7.	(Poland) TKH Torun	12	0	0	0	12	26:67	0
