= Dnipro Kherson =

HC Dnipro Kherson (Ukrainian: ХК Дніпро, Херсон) is an ice hockey team in Kherson, Ukraine. They play in Ukrainian Hockey League. Dnepr youth teams have repeatedly won national gold in their age divisions in 2012, 2014 and 2017. They also finished second overall in 2013 and 2018.

Taking place at SSE Arena on Wednesday 19 April 2023, a one-off international was contested between a purpose-built Belfast Giants All Stars team – consisting of current and former Giants players and a few special guests – and Ukrainian National Championship side Dnipro Kherson. The two teams was played in aid of the charity Ukrainian Hockey Dream which is part of the Ice Hockey Federation of Ukraine’s ‘Hockey Can’t Stop Tour’. In total, the event raised £50,000 for Ukrainian Hockey Dream.

== Achievements ==
- Black Sea Cup champion (3): 2009, 2011, 2012.
