= HC Politekhnik Kyiv =

Ice hockey team

Politekhinik Kyiv
- City: Kyiv, Ukraine
- League: Ukrainian Hockey Championship
- Founded: 1992

Franchise history
- 1992-1993: KPI Kyiv
- 1993-1996: Politekhinik Kyiv
- 1996-2001: Politekhinik Yasya Kyiv
- 2001-2005: Politekhinik Kyiv

Politekhinik Kyiv (Ukrainian: Політехнік Київ) was an ice hockey team in Kyiv, Ukraine. It was a hockey team of the Kyiv Polytechnic Institute (KPI).

They participated in the Ukrainian Hockey Championship from 1992 to 2005.
