= HC Dniprovski Vovky Dnipro =

- City: Dnipro, Ukraine
- League: Ukrainian Hockey League
- Founded: 2002
- Home arena: Meteor Sport Arena
- Colours: Black, Red

HC Dniprovski Vovky or HC Dniprovski Vovky Dnipro was an ice hockey team in Dnipro, Ukraine. They played in the Ukrainian Hockey League, the top level of ice hockey in Ukraine. Their last appearance in the league came during the 2008-09 season.

The team was founded in 2002 as HK Meteor Dnipropetrovsk, and took on their current name in 2004.
