= HC Berkut =

Berkut
- Nickname: "Golden Eagles"
- City: Brovary
- League: Professional Hockey League (2011–2013)
- Founded: 2004
- Folded: 2013
- Home arena: Ice Arena TEC Terminal (capacity: 1,500)
- Colours
- Owner(s): (Georgia (country)) David Zhvaniya
- Website: HC-Berkut.com

Franchise history
- HC Berkut: HC Podil (2010–11); HC Berkut (2004–10)

Berkut Hockey Club (Ukrainian: ХК Беркут, HC Berkut) was a Ukrainian professional ice hockey team based in Brovary. While its home arena is in Brovary, within the Kyiv region, it also played in the city of Kyiv.

It was a founding member of the Professional Hockey League of Ukraine, before being expelled by the League and forfeited from the 2013 playoffs. The organization's current focus is its youth development program.

The team's name, Berkut, means golden eagle.

== History ==
=== Financial dispute ===
The team was expelled by the League and forfeited from the 2013 playoffs for not fulfilling its financial obligations to the League and to its players. Its former captain, Serhiy Klymentiev, along with goaltender Igor Karpenko filed a lawsuit against the club at the conclusion of the season. It has since not taken part in the 2013–14 Ukrainian Hockey Championship season.

=== Name change ===
On 26 January 2014, it was announced that HC Berkut-2, a Ukrainian ice hockey team in the Amateur Hockey League would be changing so as to avoid association with Berkut forces in their role repressing Euromaidan activists.

== Players ==
=== Team captains ===
- (Russia) Roman Malov 2011 – 2012
- (Ukraine) Serhiy Klymentiev 2012 – 2013

=== Head coaches ===
- (Ukraine) Dmytro Markovsky, 2011 – 2012
- (Czech Republic) Miloš Holaň, 2012 – present
