= 1991–92 Soviet League season =

Soviet ice hockey season

The 1991–92 Soviet League season was the 46th and final season of the Soviet Championship League, the top level of ice hockey in the Soviet Union. This season was also known as the first and only one of the Ice Hockey Championship of the Commonwealth of Independent States (CIS), as the Soviet Union dissolved during the season, and the championship was continued by the Commonwealth of Independent States. 16 teams participated in the league, and Dynamo Moscow won the championship.

== Regular season ==
=== First round ===
	Club	GP	W	T	L	GF	GA	Points
1.	HC Dynamo Moscow	30	25	3	2	124	58	53
2.	HC CSKA Moscow	30	21	2	7	123	74	44
3.	Krylya Sovetov	30	18	2	10	113	86	38
4.	Khimik Voskresensk	30	17	2	11	97	83	36
5.	Torpedo Ust-Kamenogorsk	30	16	3	11	114	109	35
6.	Traktor Chelyabinsk	30	15	3	12	98	83	33
7.	HC Spartak Moscow	30	15	3	12	117	102	33
8.	Torpedo Nizhny Novgorod	30	13	6	11	83	76	32
9.	HC Lada Togliatti	30	14	2	14	83	96	30
10.	Avtomobilist Yekaterinburg	30	13	2	15	89	103	28
11.	Torpedo Yaroslavl	30	11	4	15	92	107	26
12.	Avangard Omsk	30	9	5	16	80	106	23
13.	Itil Kazan	30	9	4	17	71	92	22
14.	HK Riga	30	10	0	20	94	127	20
15.	Sokil Kyiv	30	7	1	22	101	139	15
16.	Dinamo Minsk	30	5	2	23	84	102	12

=== Second round ===
Group A	Club	GP	W	T	L	GF	GA	Points
1.	Dynamo Moscow	6	4	2	0	30	14	10
2.	Khimik Voskresensk	6	3	1	2	21	18	7
3.	Torpedo Nizhny Novgorod	6	2	2	2	22	23	6
4.	Torpedo Ust-Kamenogorsk	6	0	1	5	12	30	1

Group B	Club	GP	W	T	L	GF	GA	Points
1.	CSKA Moscow	6	6	0	0	29	8	12
2.	Spartak Moscow	6	2	2	2	17	16	6
3.	Traktor Chelyabinsk	6	1	3	2	13	24	5
4.	Krylya Sovetov	6	0	1	5	9	20	1

== Playoffs ==
Semi-finals
HC Dynamo Moscow	3
HC Spartak Moscow	1
HC CSKA Moscow	3
Khimik Voskresensk	2

Final
HC Dynamo Moscow	3
HC CSKA Moscow	0
Third place
HK Spartak Moscow	2
Khimik Voskresensk	0

Classification games

- Torpedo Nizhny Novgorod - Krylya Sovetov Moscow 3-1 on series
- Traktor Chelyabinsk - Torpedo Ust-Kamenogorsk 3-0 on series

5th place

- Traktor Chelyabinsk – Torpedo Nizhny Novgorod 3–2 on series

7th place

- Krylya Sovetov Moscow – Torpedo Ust-Kamenogorsk 3–0 on series
