= ShVSM Kyiv =

ShVSM Kyiv (Ukrainian: ШВСМ Київ) was an ice hockey team based in Kyiv, Ukraine. The abbreviation stands for the School of Higher Sports Mastery (Ukrainian: Школа Вищої Спортивної Майстерності). ShVSM represents a network of sports schools across Ukraine.

== History ==
During the Soviet era, ShVSM Kyiv participated in the Pervaya Liga and the Vtoraya Liga which were the second and third-tier leagues, respectively, in the Soviet ice hockey league system.

After Ukraine gained independence, ShVSM competed in the Ukrainian Hockey Championship. They participated in the championship for three seasons from 1993-1995, and won the title in 1994.

== Achievements ==
- Ukrainian champion (1): 1994.
