= HC ATEK Kyiv =

HK ATEK Kyiv
- City: Kyiv, Ukraine
- League: Ukrainian Hockey League
- Founded: 1994
- Home arena: ATEK Sport Complex
- Colours: Red, Black, White

HK ATEK Kyiv was an ice hockey team in Kyiv, Ukraine. The team played in the Ukrainian Hockey League, the top level of Ukrainian ice hockey.

They were founded in 1994, and were Ukrainian champions in 2007. Their last appearance in the Ukrainian Hockey League came during the 2008–09 season. The club was inactive from 2009 to 2014. ATEK returned to the Ukrainian League in 2014–15, and won their second championship by defeating the favored HC Kremenchuk in the final.

== Achievements ==
- Won the 2006–07 Ukrainian Hockey Championship
- Won the 2014–15 Ukrainian Hockey Championship

== See also ==
- Red Excavator Plant
