= HC Kryzhynka Kompanion =

HC Kryzhynka-Kompanion
- City: Kyiv
- League: Ukrainian Hockey League
- Founded: 2000
- Home arena: Ice Palace Kyiv (capacity 700)
- Colours: Blue, White
- General manager: (Ukraine) Mikhail Grishin
- Head coach: (Ukraine) Olexander Seukand

Franchise history
- 2000–2006: HC Kyiv
- 2006–2010: HC Kompanion Kyiv
- 2010–2015: HC Kompanion-Naftohaz
- 2015–2016: HC Kryzhynka-Kompanion

Hockey Club Kryzhynka-Kompanion (Ukrainian: Хокейний клуб Крижинка-Компаньйон, Russian: Хокейний клуб Льдинка-Компаньон) is an ice hockey team in Kyiv, Ukraine. They play in the Ukrainian Hockey League, the top level of ice hockey in Ukraine.

== History ==
The club was founded as HK Kyiv in 2000, and changed their name to HK Kompanion Kyiv in 2006.

The team was backed financially by Naftogaz and Yuriy Boyko between the years 2010–2015, playing these years under the name Hockey Club Kompanion-Naftohaz.

== Honours ==
- (Ukraine) Ukrainian Hockey Championship Regular Season
  - Winners (1): 2013-14
- (Ukraine) Ukrainian Hockey Championship
  - Winners (1): 2014
