= Druzhba-78 =

Druzbha-78
- City: Kharkiv, Ukraine
- Founded: 1988
- Colors: Light Blue, Navy, Yellow, Red

Druzbha-78 (Ukrainian: Дружба-78; English: Friendship-78) was a U-18 ice hockey team based in Kharkiv, Ukraine.

== Sexual abuse allegations and suicide ==
In January 2012, the coach and owner of the team, Ivan Pravilov, was accused of fondling a 14-year-old Ukrainian player whom he had invited to his home in Philadelphia, Pennsylvania.

He was arrested and placed in a Federal Detention Center. Days later, he was found to be unresponsive at around 3:00 am; by 3:45, he was pronounced dead at a local hospital. Evidence suggested that he had committed suicide by hanging in his jail cell. The city medical examiner's office confirmed this on 23 February 2012.

A former student of Druzhba-78 had claimed in January 2012 that Pravilov had physically and sexually abused members of Druzhba-78.

== Notable NHL alumni ==
- (Lithuania) Dainius Zubrus
- (Russia) Andrei Zyuzin
- (United States) Auston Matthews

== See also ==
- Ivan Pravilov
