= Ivan Pravilov =

Ukrainian fencing coach; arrested for alleged sexual abuse; committed suicide in prison

- Іван Правілов
- Born: January 22, 1963; Kharkiv, Ukraine
- Died: February 10, 2012 (aged 49); FDC Philadelphia, Philadelphia, Pennsylvania, U.S.
- Occupation: Hockey coach
- Years active: 1980s–2012
- Known for: Hockey coach; arrested for sexual assault of teenage student; committed suicide in jail.
- Criminal charges: child-molestation

Ivan Pravilov (Ukrainian: Іван Правілов; January 22, 1963 – February 10, 2012) was a Ukrainian ice hockey coach. He coached a Ukrainian hockey school, Druzhba-78, before he moved to the United States in 2007. Pravilov trained a number of young players and National Hockey League (NHL) players in the Philadelphia, Pennsylvania, area, including Dainius Zubrus and Andrei Zyuzin. Pravilov was accused of fondling a 14-year-old whom he coached in January 2012, was arrested for having sexual contact with a teenager, indicted on child-molestation charges, and placed in a Philadelphia jail. He committed suicide by hanging at 49 years of age in his jail cell, on February 10, 2012.

== Coaching career ==
Pravilov was born in Kharkiv, Ukraine. He ran and coached a Ukrainian hockey school, from the 1980s, and a youth hockey team named Druzhba-78, until he came to the United States in 2007 to coach ice hockey players in the US. He was a mentor of a number of NHL and U.S. college players. He trained teenagers and professionals, including Dainius Zubrus and Andrei Zyuzin, in the Philadelphia, Pennsylvania, area.

A former student of Druzhba-78 claimed in January 2012 that Pravilov had physically abused members of Druzhba-78.

== Criminal sexual abuse allegations ==
Pravilov was accused of fondling a 14-year-old Ukrainian boy, whom he coached in hockey, on January 3, 2012, after he had invited the teenager to his apartment in Mount Airy, Philadelphia, from the child's host home in Wilmington, Delaware. He was arrested for having sexual contact with a teenage boy, indicted on child-molestation charges, and on January 19, 2012, placed in a Philadelphia jail, the Federal Detention Center. A week later, it was announced that he was wanted on an Interpol warrant and charged with traveling for the purpose of engaging in illicit sexual conduct and transporting a person to engage in criminal sexual activity.

== Suicide ==
Pravilov was found to be unresponsive in his jail cell on February 10, 2012, at 3:00 am. By 3:45, he was pronounced dead at a local hospital. A preliminary FBI investigation suggested that he had committed suicide.

The cause of the 49-year-old's death being suicide by hanging was confirmed by the Philadelphia Medical Examiner's Office on 22 February 2012.

== See also ==
- Jean Bégin, Canadian junior ice hockey coach (six seasons in the Quebec Major Junior Hockey League (QMJHL) and assistant coach on the Canada men's national junior ice hockey team), convicted of sexual assault
- Graham James, Canadian junior ice hockey coach and general manager (active in the Western Hockey League (WHL), winner of the 1989 Memorial Cup), convicted of sexual assault
- John David Roy Atchison, US Attorney and children's sports coach, committed suicide by hanging in a Michigan prison after being charged with soliciting sex from a child
- Stephen Kovacs, fencing coach, committed suicide in jail while awaiting trial for sexual misconduct
