= Dainius Zubrus =

Lithuanian ice hockey player (born 1978)

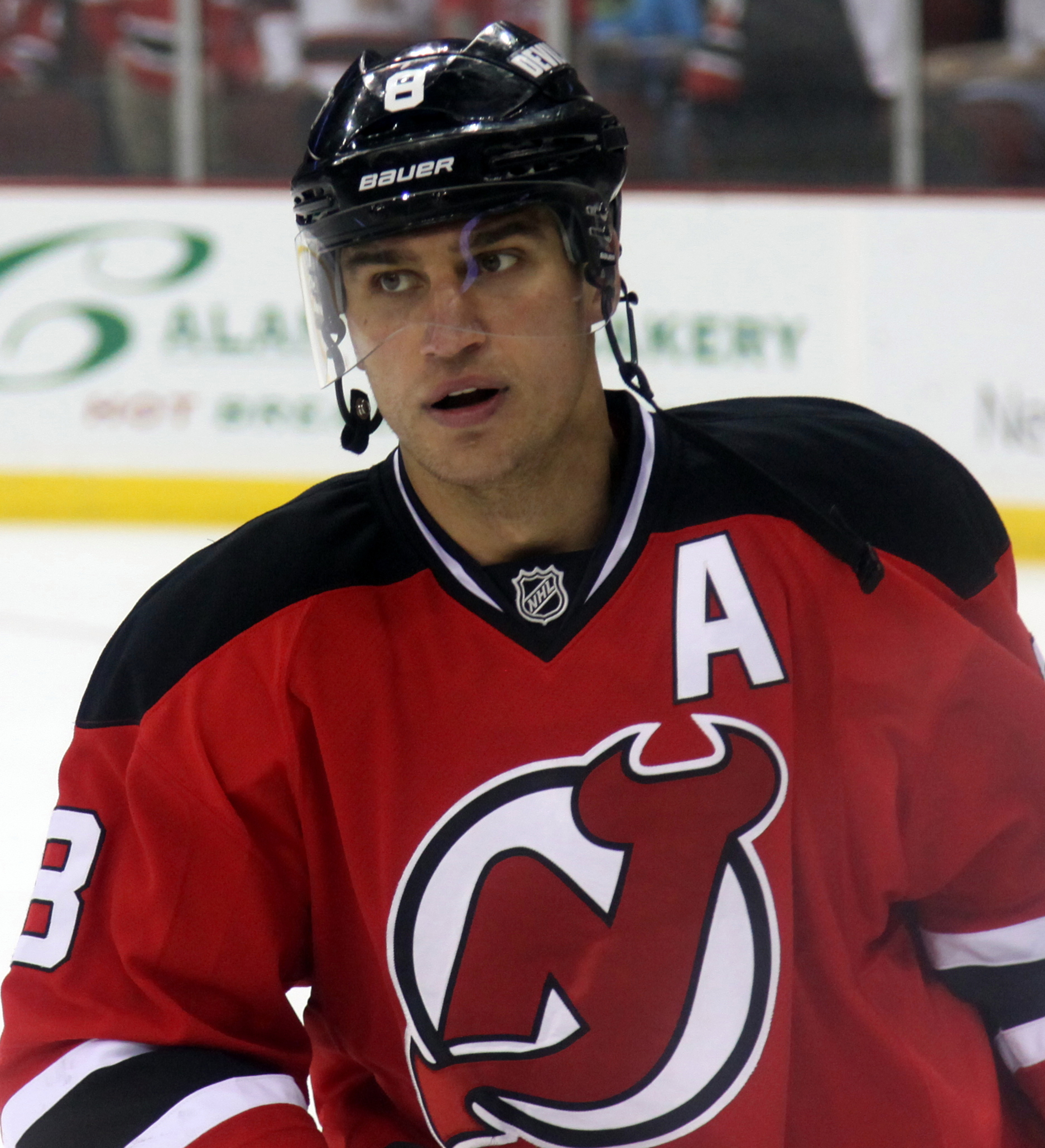
- Zubrus with the New Jersey Devils in 2014
- Born: June 16, 1978 (age 48) Elektrėnai, Lithuanian SSR, Soviet Union
- Height: 6 ft 5 in (196 cm)
- Weight: 225 lb (102 kg; 16 st 1 lb)
- Position: Forward
- Shot: Left
- Played for: Philadelphia Flyers; Montreal Canadiens; Washington Capitals; Buffalo Sabres; New Jersey Devils; San Jose Sharks
- National team: Russia and Lithuania
- NHL draft: 15th overall, 1996; Philadelphia Flyers
- Playing career: 1996–2019

Dainius Gintas Zubrus (born June 16, 1978) is a Lithuanian former professional ice hockey player. He played as forward in the National Hockey League (NHL), the first Lithuanian to have played 1,000 games in the NHL. Drafted 15th overall in the 1996 NHL entry draft by the Philadelphia Flyers, Zubrus played for the Flyers, Montreal Canadiens, Washington Capitals, Buffalo Sabres, New Jersey Devils and San Jose Sharks.

== Playing career ==
=== Early career ===
In the summer of 1989 at 11 years of age, Zubrus moved to Kharkiv, Ukrainian SSR, Soviet Union, to train under Ukrainian coach Ivan Pravilov, with whom he became close as he played for him for six years, on the Druzhba-78 squad, where he played until the end of 1995. As a youth, he played in the 1992 Quebec International Pee-Wee Hockey Tournament with them. Pravilov was arrested in 2012 for sexual abuse of a teenage student, and committed suicide by hanging in prison. Zubrus said: "Since learning of the terrible accusations against my former coach, all my thoughts and concerns have been for the children. I have reached out to the children, and assured them that I am, and will continue to be, there for them."

=== Professional ===
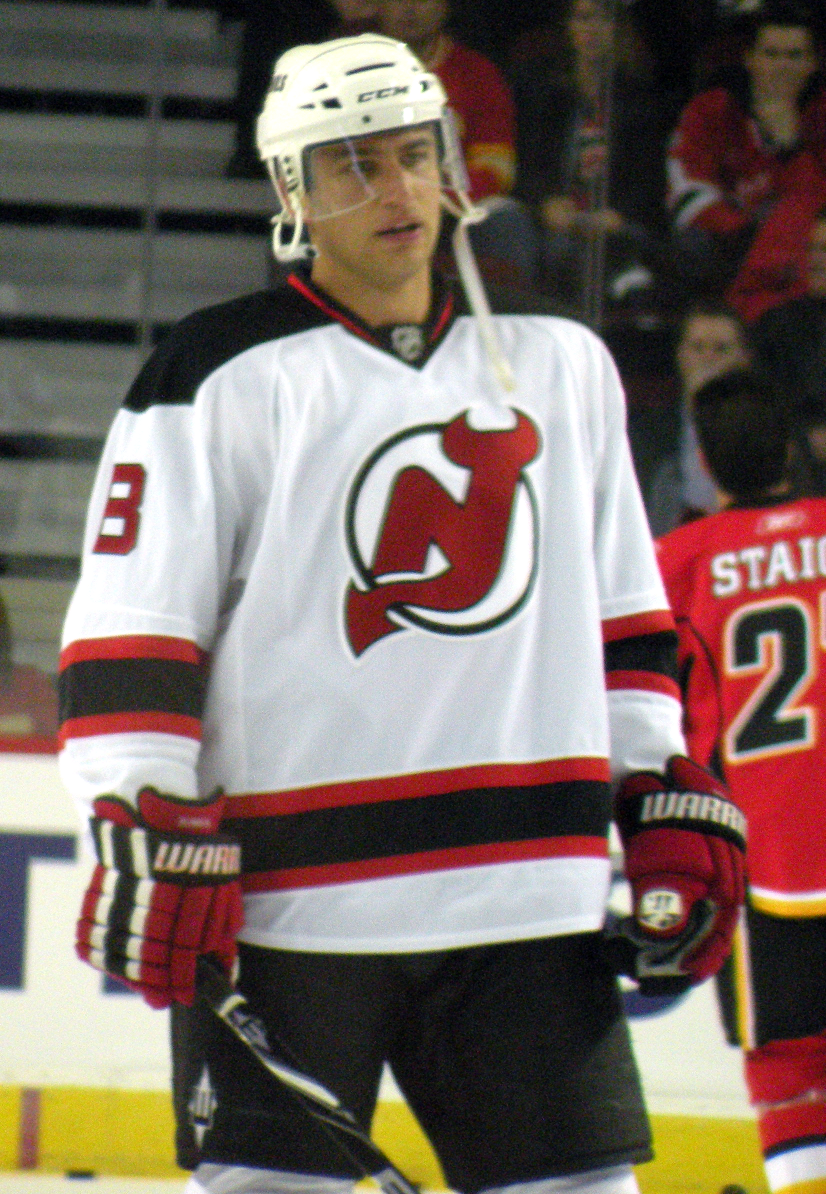
Zubrus in 2010

The Philadelphia Flyers selected Zubrus 15th overall in the 1996 NHL entry draft from the Caledon Canadians of the Metro Junior A Hockey League, making him the highest drafted Tier II Junior "A" player since the inception of the Canadian Junior A Hockey League in 1993 (a record later surpassed when Kyle Turris was selected third at 2007 NHL entry draft). Prior to being traded to Caledon, Zubrus played for the Pembroke Lumber Kings of the Central Junior A Hockey League.

Zubrus made his NHL debut on October 5, 1996, scoring a goal against the Florida Panthers. In his rookie season, he helped the Flyers reach the 1997 Stanley Cup Final. The Flyers traded him to the Montreal Canadiens on March 10, 1999, along with a pair of draft picks, in exchange for Mark Recchi. He registered his first career hat-trick on October 14, 2000, against the Chicago Blackhawks, and was traded to the Washington Capitals (along with Trevor Linden) in exchange for Richard Zedník and Jan Bulis on March 13, 2001.

During the 2004–05 NHL lockout, Zubrus decided to play abroad with Capitals teammate Alexander Semin. He played 42 regular season games for Lada Togliatti, recording 8 goals and 11 assists for 19 points. He also appeared in ten playoff games while in the former Russian Superleague (RSL), scoring three goals and one assist.

Zubrus returned to the Capitals the following 2005–06 season and recorded a career-high 57 points playing alongside star rookie Alexander Ovechkin. In the 2006–07 season, Zubrus continued his impressive form, posting 52 points in 60 games before he was traded on February 27, 2007, to the Buffalo Sabres (along with Timo Helbling) in exchange for Jiří Novotný and a first round-draft pick.

On July 3, 2007, as a free agent, Zubrus signed a six-year, $20.4 million contract with the New Jersey Devils.

On November 23, 2008, Zubrus had one of the best offensive games in Devils history. Zubrus tied a team record with four goals to help New Jersey win its season-high fourth straight game, 7–3 over the Tampa Bay Lightning. Four years later, Zubrus got to his second Stanley Cup decision, losing the 2012 Stanley Cup Final to the Los Angeles Kings. On July 4, 2013, the Devils re-signed Zubrus to a reported three-year contract.

On July 29, 2015, after eight seasons with the Devils, Zubrus was placed on unconditional waivers for the purpose of terminating the final year of his contract.

On October 27, 2015, it was announced Zubrus was invited to professional tryout (PTO) with the St. Louis Blues. On November 6, 2015, Zubrus was released from his professional tryout after the Blues opted instead to sign Martin Havlát to a one-year contract.

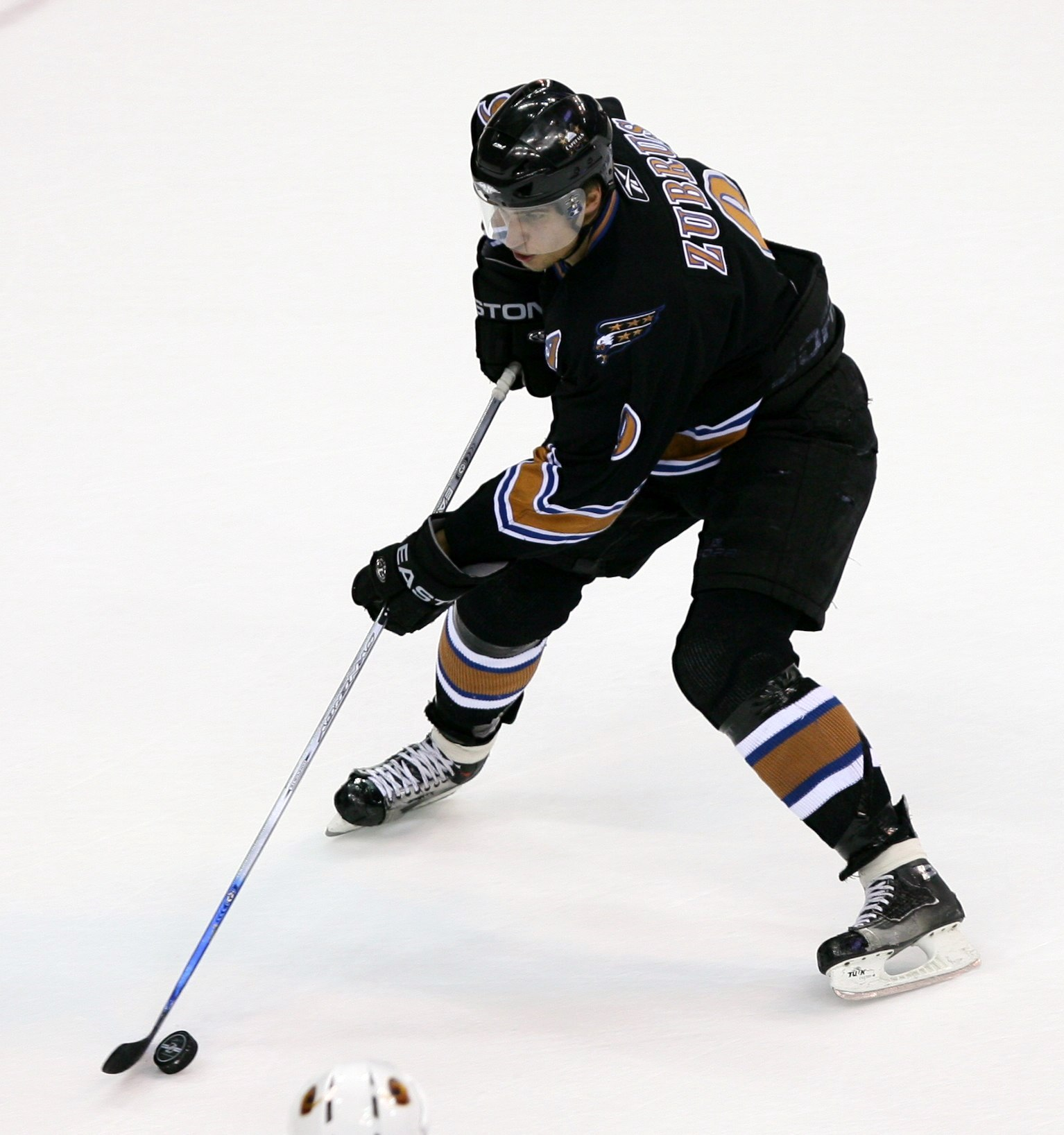
Zubrus with the Washington Capitals

On November 16, 2015, Zubrus was invited to a professional tryout by the San Jose Sharks. Eight days later, he signed a contract with the Sharks, reuniting with former Devils head coach Peter DeBoer and former Devils teammate Paul Martin. With San Jose, Zubrus reached his third Stanley Cup Final, which the Sharks lost to the Pittsburgh Penguins. He retired during the off-season.

== International play ==
Originally, Zubrus had suited up for the Russia national team during the World Cup of Hockey in 2004. But since then, he has played internationally for Lithuania, most notably in the 2005 World Championships. He had told the press, "Lithuania needs me more than Russia". Because of the existence of the Soviet Union, players born during its time as a nation were able to choose to play for any of the newly formed countries after the breakup, and even considered representing Ukraine due to his training there.

== Executive career ==
In 2018, Zubrus was elected as president of Hockey Lietuva, the governing body of ice hockey in Lithuania. In May 2022, he was re-elected for a second term.

== Personal life ==
Zubrus and his wife have two children.

Zubrus holds dual citizenship and is a citizen of Lithuania and the United States.

== Career statistics ==
=== Regular season and playoffs ===
			Regular season					Playoffs
Season	Team	League	GP	G	A	Pts	PIM	GP	G	A	Pts	PIM
1995–96	Pembroke Lumber Kings	CJHL	28	19	13	32	73	—	—	—	—	—
1995–96	Caledon Canadians	MetJHL	7	3	7	10	2	17	11	12	23	4
1996–97	Philadelphia Flyers	NHL	68	8	13	21	22	19	5	4	9	12
1997–98	Philadelphia Flyers	NHL	69	8	25	33	42	5	0	1	1	2
1998–99	Philadelphia Flyers	NHL	63	3	5	8	25	—	—	—	—	—
1998–99	Montreal Canadiens	NHL	17	3	5	8	4	—	—	—	—	—
1999–2000	Montreal Canadiens	NHL	73	14	28	42	54	—	—	—	—	—
2000–01	Montreal Canadiens	NHL	49	12	12	24	30	—	—	—	—	—
2000–01	Washington Capitals	NHL	12	1	1	2	7	6	0	0	0	2
2001–02	Washington Capitals	NHL	71	17	26	43	38	—	—	—	—	—
2002–03	Washington Capitals	NHL	63	13	22	35	43	6	2	2	4	4
2003–04	Washington Capitals	NHL	54	12	15	27	38	—	—	—	—	—
2004–05	Lada Togliatti	RSL	42	8	11	19	85	10	3	1	4	22
2005–06	Washington Capitals	NHL	71	23	34	57	84	—	—	—	—	—
2006–07	Washington Capitals	NHL	60	20	32	52	50	—	—	—	—	—
2006–07	Buffalo Sabres	NHL	19	4	4	8	12	15	0	8	8	8
2007–08	New Jersey Devils	NHL	82	13	25	38	38	5	0	1	1	8
2008–09	New Jersey Devils	NHL	82	15	25	40	69	7	0	1	1	10
2009–10	New Jersey Devils	NHL	51	10	17	27	28	5	1	0	1	8
2010–11	New Jersey Devils	NHL	79	13	17	30	53	—	—	—	—	—
2011–12	New Jersey Devils	NHL	82	17	27	44	34	24	3	7	10	18
2012–13	New Jersey Devils	NHL	22	2	7	9	12	—	—	—	—	—
2013–14	New Jersey Devils	NHL	82	13	13	26	46	—	—	—	—	—
2014–15	New Jersey Devils	NHL	74	4	6	10	42	—	—	—	—	—
2015–16	San Jose Sharks	NHL	50	3	4	7	20	14	1	1	2	6
NHL totals			1,293	228	363	591	791	106	12	25	37	78

=== International ===
Year	Team	Event	GP	G	A	Pts	PIM
2004	Russia	WCH	4	2	1	3	4
2005	Lithuania	WC D1	4	3	1	4	2
2014	Lithuania	WC D1B	5	2	7	9	4
2018	Lithuania	WC D1B	5	0	6	6	2
2019	Lithuania	WC D1A	5	1	0	1	4
Tier I senior totals			4	2	1	3	4
Tier II senior totals			19	6	14	20	12

== See also ==
- List of NHL players with 1,000 games played

Awards and achievements
Preceded by Brian Boucher	Philadelphia Flyers first-round draft pick 1996	Succeeded by Simon Gagné
