= Andrei Zyuzin =

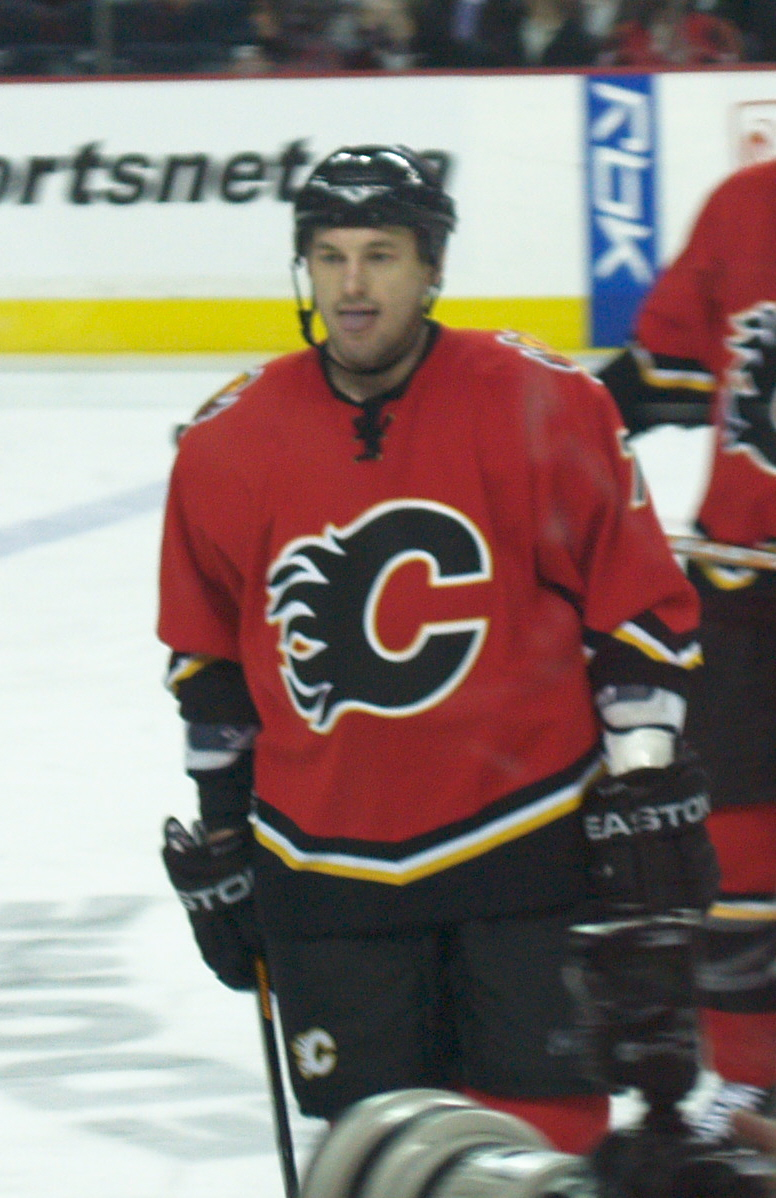
- Born: January 21, 1978 (age 48) Ufa, Russian SFSR, Soviet Union
- Height: 6 ft 1 in (185 cm)
- Weight: 210 lb (95 kg; 15 st 0 lb)
- Position: Defence
- Shot: Left
- Played for: Salavat Yulaev Ufa; San Jose Sharks; Tampa Bay Lightning; New Jersey Devils; Minnesota Wild; Severstal Cherepovets; Calgary Flames; Chicago Blackhawks; SKA St. Petersburg; Atlant Mytishi; EHC Biel; EC KAC; Bilyi Bars; HK Vitebsk
- National team: Russia
- NHL draft: 2nd overall, 1996; San Jose Sharks
- Playing career: 1997–2014

Andrei Yurievich Zyuzin (Russian: Андрей Юрьевич Зюзин; born January 21, 1978) is a Russian former professional ice hockey defenceman. He played in the National Hockey League (NHL) for the San Jose Sharks, Tampa Bay Lightning, New Jersey Devils, Minnesota Wild, Calgary Flames and Chicago Blackhawks.

== Playing career ==
As a youth, Zyuzin played in the 1992 Quebec International Pee-Wee Hockey Tournament with the Druzhba-78 squad, a team from Kharkiv. Ukraine. He was trained by Ukrainian coach Ivan Pravilov, who was arrested in 2012 for sexual abuse of a teenage student, and committed suicide by hanging in prison.

Zyuzin was drafted 2nd overall by the San Jose Sharks in the 1996 NHL entry draft. Zyuzin has played 415 career NHL games, scoring 35 goals and 74 assists for 109 points. He was signed as an unrestricted free agent by the Calgary Flames on July 1, 2006. Zyuzin scored one of the biggest goals in the history of the San Jose Sharks when he took a slapshot from the point to beat Ed Belfour and helped the Sharks take Game 4 in the 1997–1998 Western Conference quarterfinals against the Dallas Stars. Zyuzin scored the goal 6:31 into the overtime period and led the Sharks to a 1–0 win.

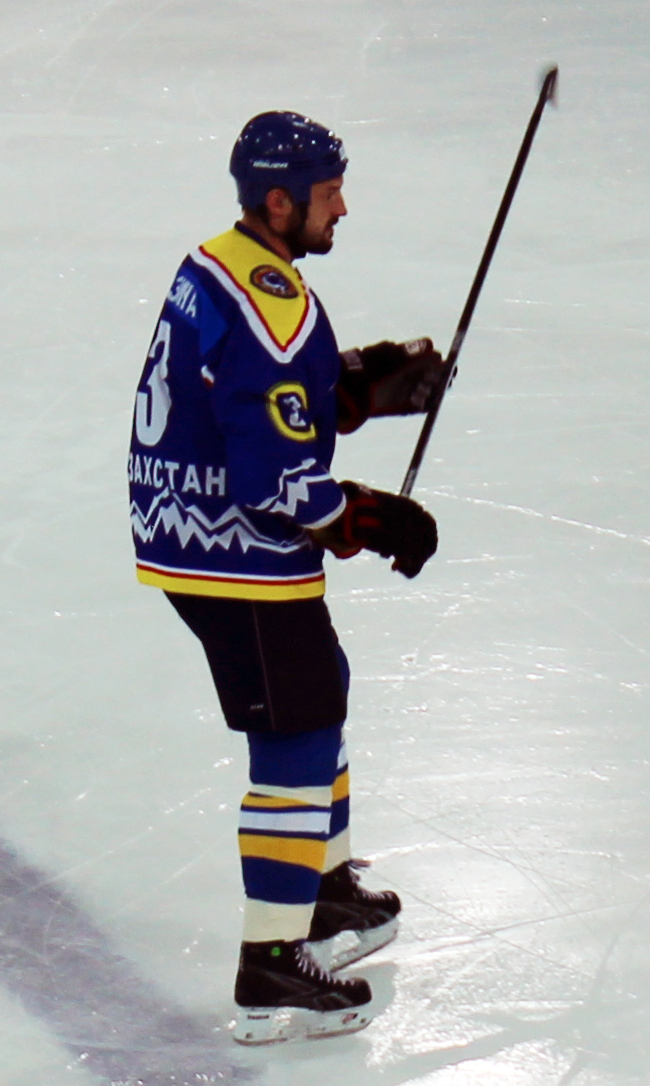
Andrei Zyuzin with HC Almaty in 2013.

On June 22, 2007, Andrei Zyuzin was traded to the Chicago Blackhawks along with Steve Marr for defenceman Adrian Aucoin and the Blackhawks' seventh round pick in the 2007 NHL entry draft. After playing 32 games for the Blackhawks, Zyuzin left the NHL, signing with St. Petersburg SKA of the Kontinental Hockey League.

Zyuzin played parts of three seasons for St. Petersburg, achieving 31 points with the team. After leaving St. Petersburg SKA and the KHL, he headed over to Austria and Switzerland, playing parts of the 2011-12 season in the Swiss National League A for EHC Biel and playing in the Austrian Hockey League for Klagenfurt AC.

After ending his tenure in Austria and Switzerland, Zyuzin played the next two seasons with three different teams. He played 2 games in the 2012-13 VHL season for Rubin Tyumen and in the 2013-14 hockey season he played games for Bilyi Bars of the Ukrainian Hockey Championship and 8 games for HK Vitebsk of the Belarusian Extraliga, going pointless with 12 penalty minutes.

== Coaching ==
Zyuzin began his coaching career in the 2015–16 KHL season as an assistant coach for Ufa Salavat Yulayev. The team placed fourth in the Eastern Conference and advanced to the Gagarin Cup playoffs. The team was eliminated in the Conference Finals by Metallurg Magnitogorsk in 5 games. Zyuzin returned for the 2016-17 season, once again as an assistant coach for Ufa Salavat Yulayev, finishing sixth in the Eastern Conference with 88 points. The team was eliminated in the first round of the playoffs by AK Bars Kazan.

== Personal life ==
Andrei Zyuzin is married to his wife, Teresa, and has a son, Ivan, and a daughter, Ava.

== Career statistics ==
=== Regular season and playoffs ===
			Regular season					Playoffs
Season	Team	League	GP	G	A	Pts	PIM	GP	G	A	Pts	PIM
1994–95	Salavat Yulaev Ufa	RUS	30	3	0	3	16	—	—	—	—	—
1994–95	Novoil Ufa	RUS II	17	3	3	6	14	—	—	—	—	—
1995–96	Salavat Yulaev Ufa	RUS	41	6	3	9	24	—	—	—	—	—
1996–97	Salavat Yulaev Ufa	RSL	32	7	10	17	28	—	—	—	—	—
1997–98	Kentucky Thoroughblades	AHL	17	4	5	9	28	—	—	—	—	—
1997–98	San Jose Sharks	NHL	56	6	7	13	66	6	1	0	1	14
1998–99	San Jose Sharks	NHL	25	3	1	4	38	—	—	—	—	—
1998–99	Kentucky Thoroughblades	AHL	23	2	12	14	42	—	—	—	—	—
1999–00	Tampa Bay Lightning	NHL	34	2	9	11	33	—	—	—	—	—
2000–01	Detroit Vipers	IHL	2	0	1	1	0	—	—	—	—	—
2000–01	Tampa Bay Lightning	NHL	64	4	16	20	76	—	—	—	—	—
2001–02	Tampa Bay Lightning	NHL	9	0	2	2	6	—	—	—	—	—
2001–02	Albany River Rats	AHL	3	0	1	1	2	—	—	—	—	—
2001–02	New Jersey Devils	NHL	38	1	2	3	25	—	—	—	—	—
2002–03	New Jersey Devils	NHL	1	0	1	1	2	—	—	—	—	—
2002–03	Minnesota Wild	NHL	66	4	12	16	34	18	0	1	1	14
2003–04	Minnesota Wild	NHL	65	8	13	21	48	—	—	—	—	—
2004–05	Salavat Yulaev Ufa	RSL	14	2	2	4	6	—	—	—	—	—
2004–05	Severstal Cherepovets	RSL	10	2	1	3	6	—	—	—	—	—
2005–06	Minnesota Wild	NHL	57	7	11	18	50	—	—	—	—	—
2006–07	Calgary Flames	NHL	49	1	5	6	30	5	1	0	1	2
2007–08	Chicago Blackhawks	NHL	32	2	3	5	38	—	—	—	—	—
2008–09	SKA St. Petersburg	KHL	36	6	4	10	36	2	0	0	0	4
2009–10	SKA St. Petersburg	KHL	53	5	15	20	64	4	0	0	0	2
2010–11	SKA St. Petersburg	KHL	12	0	1	1	12	—	—	—	—	—
2010–11	HC VMF St. Petersburg	VHL	8	1	0	1	24	—	—	—	—	—
2010–11	Atlant Mytishchi	KHL	16	1	1	2	10	12	0	1	1	6
2011–12	EHC Biel	NLA	13	0	2	2	16	—	—	—	—	—
2011–12	Klagenfurt AC	AUT	5	1	0	1	2	6	0	2	2	4
2012–13	Rubin Tyumen	VHL	2	1	0	1	2	—	—	—	—	—
2013–14	HK Vitebsk	BLR	8	0	0	0	12	—	—	—	—	—
RSL totals			127	20	15	35	82	—	—	—	—	—
NHL totals			496	38	82	120	446	29	2	1	3	30
KHL totals			117	12	21	33	122	18	0	1	1	12

=== International ===
Year	Team	Event	Result	GP	G	A	Pts	PIM
1995	Russia	EJC	4th	5	0	0	0	0
1996	Russia	EJC	1st place, gold medalist(s)	5	5	2	7	8
1996	Russia	WJC	3rd place, bronze medalist(s)	7	1	4	5	2
1997	Russia	WJC	3rd place, bronze medalist(s)	6	1	1	2	6
Junior totals				23	7	7	14	16

Awards and achievements
Preceded by Teemu Riihijärvi	San Jose Sharks first-round draft pick 1996	Succeeded by Marco Sturm
