= Boris Dorozhenko =

Ice hockey player

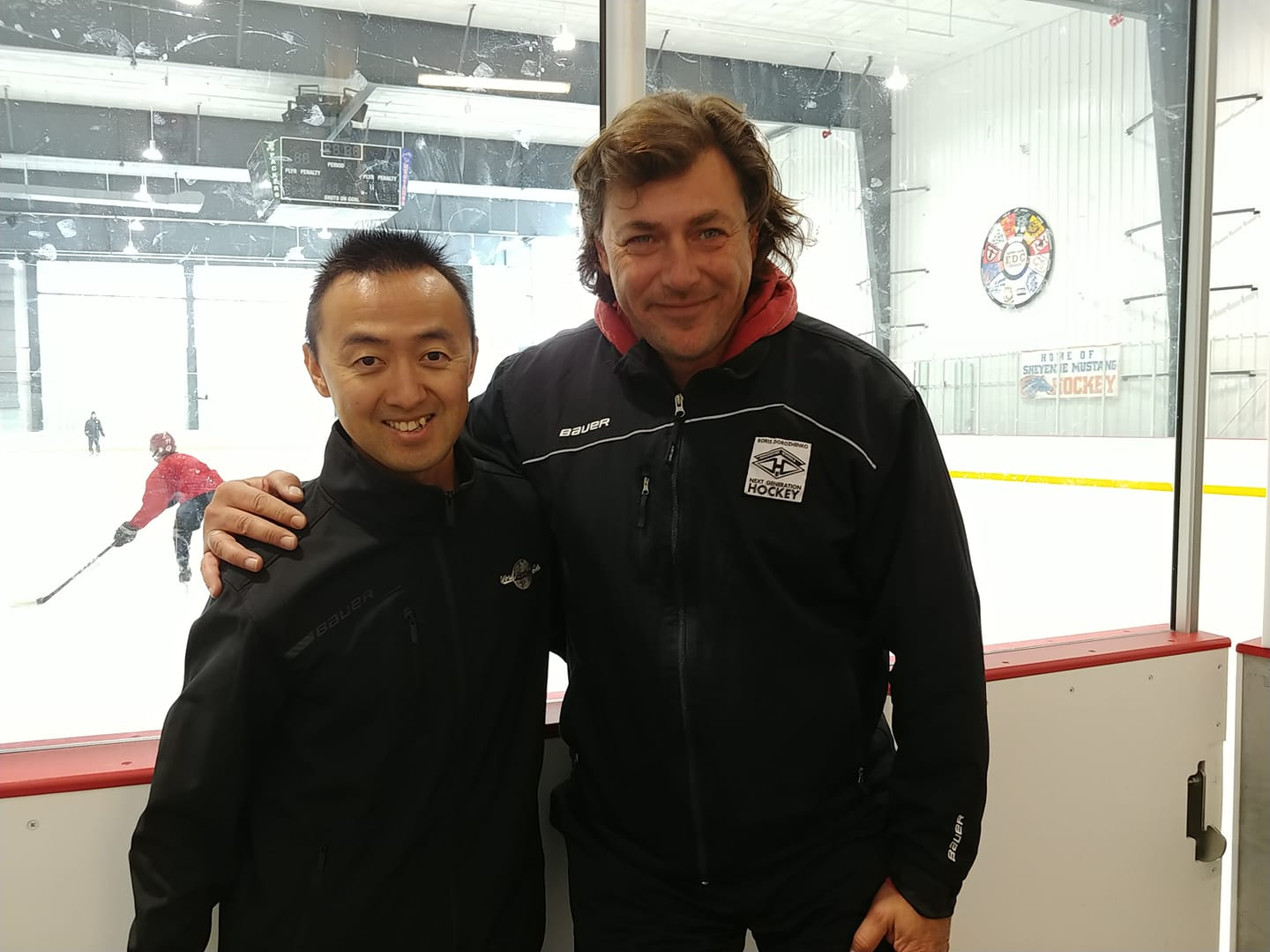
- With Hiroki Wakabayashi
- Born: Kyiv, Ukrainian SSR, Soviet Union
- Education: University of Kyiv
- Occupation: Hockey coach
- Known for: Training future NHL players
- Title: Former Director of the Mexico Ice Hockey Federation

Boris Dorozhenko is a Ukrainian-born hockey coach. He played professional hockey in the former USSR, before becoming the director of the Mexico Ice Hockey Federation, where he helped develop that country's national hockey program. He then founded the Next Generation Hockey school, which relocated to Scottsdale, Arizona. There he has trained young hockey players, including Auston Matthews.

== Early life ==
Boris Dorozhenko was born in Kyiv, in what is now Ukraine, during Soviet rule, and began playing hockey at nine years old. He has a degree in Mathematics from the University of Kyiv and played professional hockey in Russia until retiring in 1994.

== Coaching ==
Following his playing career Dorozhenko relocated to Mexico during the collapse of the USSR, and once there he was placed in charge of developing a national hockey program through the Mexican Hockey Federation. As the program's director, he developed the program from the ground up, beginning with the development of peewee age hockey programs in Mexico City.

Dorozhenko then moved his hockey school, Next Generation Hockey, to Scottsdale, Arizona in 2005. The move was precipitated by a training camp he held in Phoenix the prior year, where he met the future NHLer Auston Matthews, who was age seven at the time. It was Matthews’ parents that suggested to Dorozhenko that he move to Arizona full-time—where he lived with the Matthews family for his first two years in the US. Dorozhenko acted as a coach to Matthews throughout his youth hockey career, and was referred to affectionately as "Uncle Boris" by the young player. He also received initial support from former NHL players Claude Lemieux and Russ Courtnall, whose sons trained under Dorozhenko.

At Next Generation Hockey, Dorozhenko runs month long camps focusing on skating and drills, and he also travels to international hockey camps to provide skating drills. These drills focus on “edge control”, so that players develop a natural ability to maneuver better while under duress. In his program, Dorozhenko places skating skills ahead of puck control skills in a player's development.
