= Auston Matthews =

American ice hockey player (born 1997)

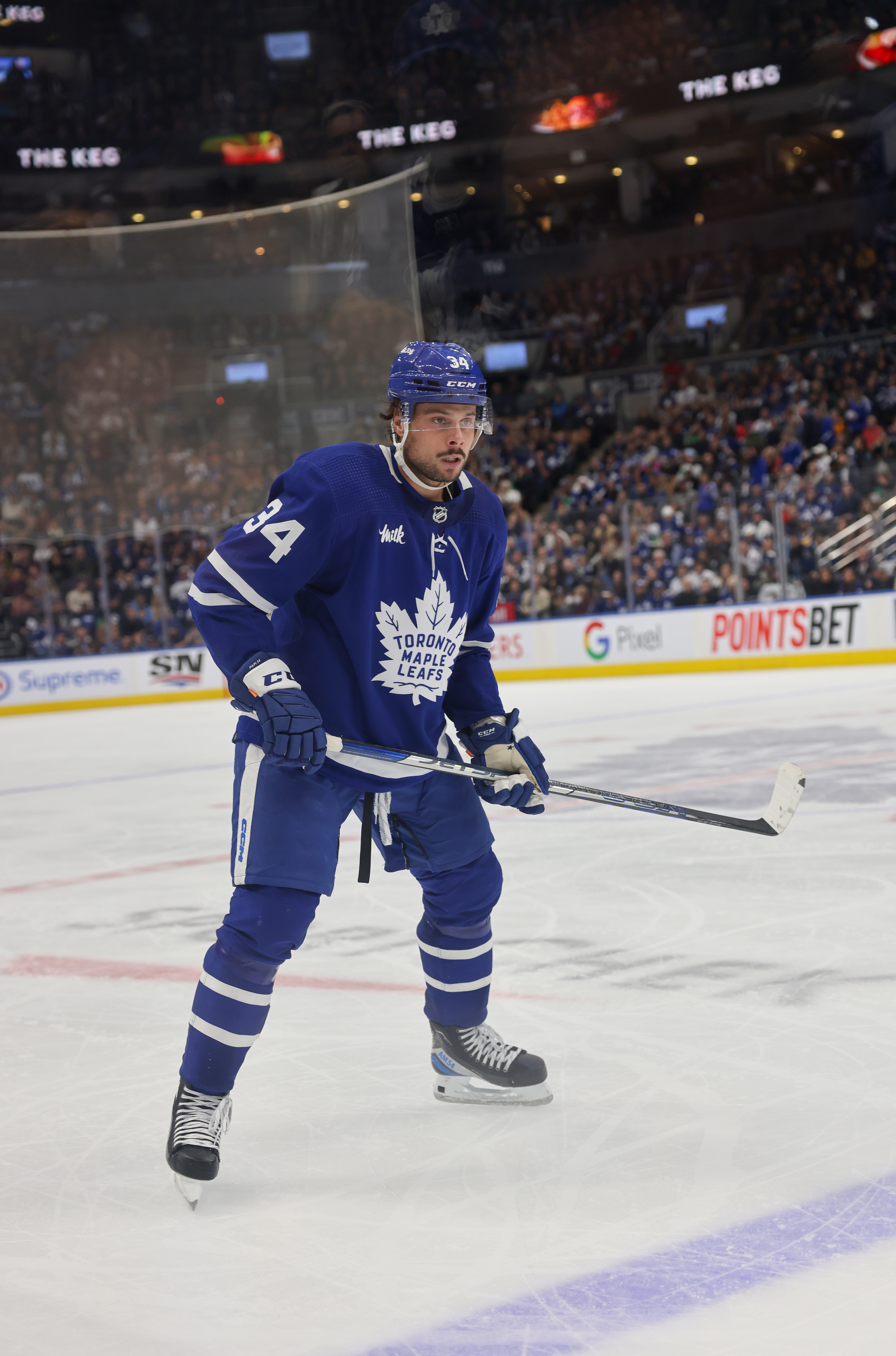
- Matthews with the Toronto Maple Leafs in October 2022
- Born: September 17, 1997 (age 29) San Ramon, California, U.S.
- Height: 6 ft 3 in (191 cm)
- Weight: 215 lb (98 kg; 15 st 5 lb)
- Position: Center
- Shoots: Left
- NHL team Former teams: Toronto Maple Leafs; ZSC Lions
- National team: United States
- NHL draft: 1st overall, 2016; Toronto Maple Leafs
- Playing career: 2015–present

Auston Taylour Matthews (born September 17, 1997) is an American professional ice hockey player who is a center and captain for the Toronto Maple Leafs of the National Hockey League (NHL). He is widely considered as one of the best players in the world with his all-around game and shot threat. His goal-scoring rate has drawn comparisons to players such as Alexander Ovechkin.

Born in San Ramon, California, Matthews and his family moved to Scottsdale, Arizona when he was an infant. After playing baseball and hockey during childhood, he developed a particular interest in hockey after watching the local Phoenix Coyotes play. A product of the USA Hockey National Team Development Program in the United States Hockey League (USHL), Matthews played for the ZSC Lions of the Swiss National League before being drafted into the NHL in 2016, winning a Swiss Cup title that same year. Matthews was widely considered the top prospect of the draft and was selected first overall by the Toronto Maple Leafs.

Matthews became the first player in modern NHL history to score four goals in his NHL debut. He scored 40 goals in his first season in 2016–17, setting the Maple Leafs rookie record and becoming just the second rookie since the 2004–05 lockout to reach the milestone (along with Alexander Ovechkin); he is just the fourth teenager in league history to accomplish the feat. His performance won him the Calder Memorial Trophy as the NHL's top rookie for the season. In 2020–21, Matthews won the Maurice "Rocket" Richard Trophy as the league's leading goal scorer with 41 goals in 52 games. In 2021–22, Matthews set records for most goals scored in a single season by both an American-born player and a Maple Leaf, reached the 60-goal mark for the first time, and won the Rocket Richard Trophy for the second consecutive season. He was also awarded the Ted Lindsay Award for most outstanding player, as voted by his peers, and the Hart Memorial Trophy as the most valuable player. In addition, he has been chosen to represent Toronto as an All-Star six times. In 2024, Matthews set the single-season goal record of the salary cap era with a total of 69 goals, surpassing Alexander Ovechkin's 65 in 2007–08 and winning his third Rocket Richard in four seasons. In 2026, Matthews became the all-time leader in goals for the Maple Leafs.

Internationally, Matthews has represented the United States on several occasions, including a U17 World Hockey Challenge, two U18 World Championships, two U20 World Championships, and one IIHF World Championship appearance. In January 2025, Matthews was named captain of the United States team for the 4 Nations Face-Off, where they finished as runners-up. He was again named captain for the 2026 Winter Olympics, leading Team USA to their first Olympic gold medal since the 1980 Winter Olympics.

== Early life ==
Auston Taylour Matthews was born in San Ramon, California, on September 17, 1997, to Brian and Ema Matthews. Brian is from California, and Ema is from Hermosillo, Mexico. He and his family moved to Scottsdale, Arizona, when he was two months old, and he began attending Phoenix Coyotes games at age two. His favorite players to watch were Shane Doan and Daniel Brière. Initially, Matthews did not have much interest in the sport but was captivated by the Zamboni machine that cleaned the ice during intermissions. He first expressed a desire to play hockey shortly after his fifth birthday and began playing with the Arizona Bobcats minor hockey program. On January 16, 2006, Matthews (who was eight years old at the time) attended a Coyotes game in which they lost to the Washington Capitals 6–1, where he witnessed Alexander Ovechkin's famous goal for Washington that would come to be known simply as "The Goal," where Ovechkin scored a goal while lying on his back after having been knocked down by a Coyotes' defenseman. In a 2016 interview, Matthews referred to the goal as "probably one of the best goals ever."

As a child, Matthews played hockey and baseball. According to his father, baseball was his best sport; Auston's hand-eye coordination made him an excellent hitter. However, Matthews opted to pursue a career in hockey because he disliked the slow pace of baseball. When he first started playing hockey, his parents knew almost nothing of the sport. His main coach during his youth was Boris Dorozhenko, who had previously founded the national ice hockey program of Mexico. During Dorozhenko's first few years in the U.S., he lived with Matthews' paternal grandparents. Matthews played in the 2010 Quebec International Pee-Wee Hockey Tournament with the Kharkiv minor ice hockey team.

== Playing career ==
=== Junior ===
Matthews was drafted 57th overall by the Western Hockey League's (WHL) Everett Silvertips in the 2012 WHL Bantam Draft but opted to play for the USA Hockey National Team Development Program, which participates in the United States Hockey League (USHL). That season, he played for the U.S. National U17 Team (USDP), where he gained national attention from NHL scouts, even being featured on the NHL website, emphasizing his unique southwestern background. In his second season with the U.S. National U18 Team (USDP), Matthews finished first in league scoring with 117 points (55 goals and 62 assists), breaking the National Team Development Program record of 102 points set by Patrick Kane in 2005–06 and besting Jack Eichel by 29 points. On May 21, 2015, Matthews won the USA Hockey Bob Johnson Award for excellence in international competition.

Matthews trained with the USA Hockey National Team Development Program team during the 2013–14 and 2014–15 seasons where he put up a total of 20 points in 20 games over the 2 seasons. He was named the most valuable player at the 2015 World U18 Championships in addition to being named to the IIHF All-Star Team, and named the IIHF Best Forward after finishing as the tournament's top scorer.

=== ZSC Lions ===
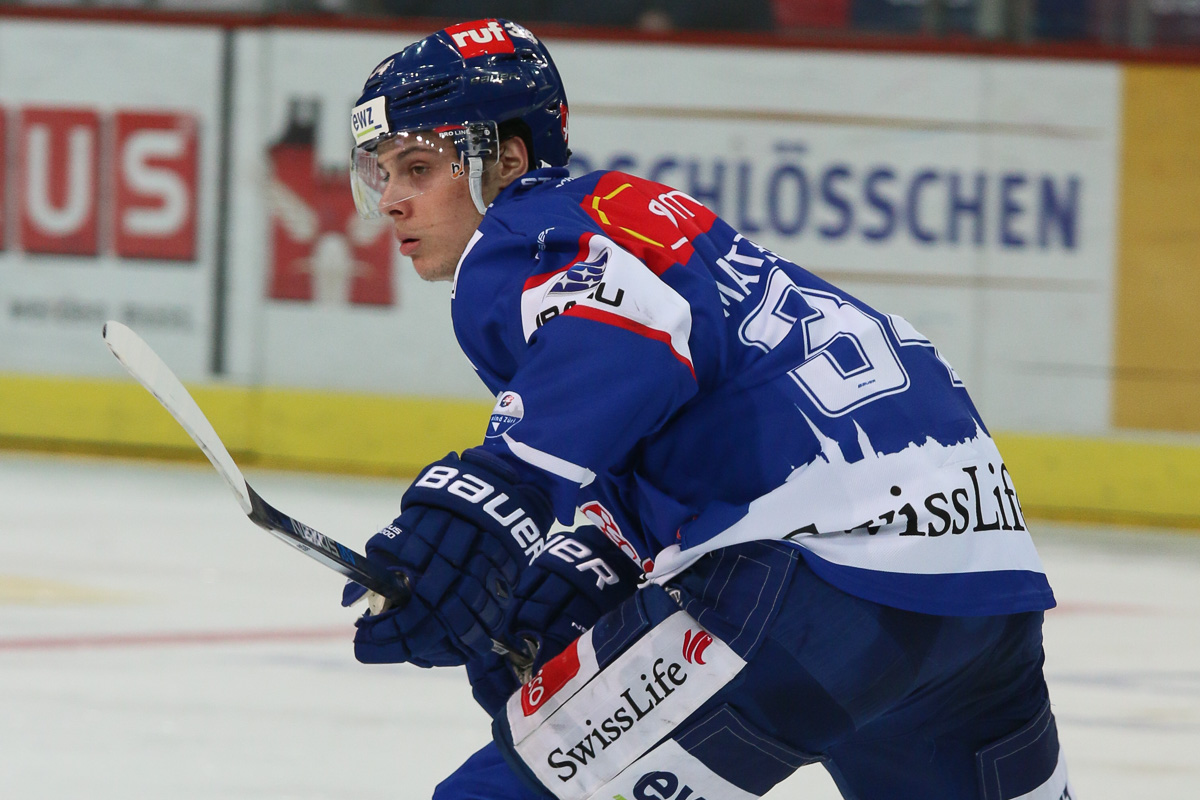
Matthews in January 2016. He chose to play professionally for his last year before he was eligible for the 2016 NHL entry draft, signing a one-year contract with the ZSC Lions of the Swiss National League A.

Rather than continue in American amateur hockey or play major junior hockey in the Canadian Hockey League, Matthews chose to play professionally for his last season before he was eligible for the 2016 NHL entry draft, having missed the 2015 NHL entry draft cutoff date of birth by two days. On August 7, 2015, he signed a one-year contract to play in the Swiss National League A (NLA) for ZSC Lions. Matthews was approached by Lions head coach Marc Crawford, who was awed by his skating and puck possession while scouting the 2015 World U18 Championships. Crawford quickly called Matthews' agent, Pat Brisson, to discuss the proposal of signing the player to the team. Matthews and his family quickly agreed once the tournament had ended and spent the next few months applying for various paperwork. After missing the first four games of the 2015–16 regular season, he made his NLA debut on September 18, 2015, and scored his first goal in the game against goaltender Benjamin Conz of HC Fribourg-Gottéron on home ice at the Hallenstadion. He would spend most of the season on a line with Robert Nilsson, finding chemistry with the veteran forward.

On February 3, 2016, Matthews recorded two assists in a 4–1 win over the Lausanne HC in the 2015–16 Swiss Cup final. He finished the 2015–16 regular season as the second top-scorer on the Lions and tenth in the NLA. His 1.28 points-per-game average was second in the league behind only longtime NHL player Pierre-Marc Bouchard. He also won the NLA Rising Star Award and was second to Bouchard in voting for most valuable player. Matthews' stint in the NLA ended earlier than expected when the top-seeded Lions were swept in the first round of the 2016 playoffs by SC Bern.

=== Toronto Maple Leafs (2016–present) ===
==== Early years in Toronto (2016–2020) ====
In late June 2016, Matthews was selected first overall in the 2016 NHL entry draft by the Toronto Maple Leafs, becoming the first American to be picked with the top selection since Patrick Kane in 2007. Matthews had been widely expected to go first overall for several months leading up to the event, consistently topping prospect charts and major scouting reports. Media speculation suggested that Matthews and the team had engaged in a minor contract dispute over the issue of performance bonuses; Matthews was asking the team for a contract similar to that of Connor McDavid or Jack Eichel, which were both valued at $3.775 million annually, inclusive of bonuses. Although Maple Leafs general manager Lou Lamoriello had been very open over his disapproval of including bonuses in player contracts in the past, he was clear in stating that performance bonuses were never an issue while negotiating Matthews' contract. Lamoriello had previously been involved in a contract dispute with the New Jersey Devils with fourth overall pick Adam Larsson over the issue of bonuses; there were no bonus clauses included in Larsson's entry-level contract. On July 21, the two parties finalized a deal, with Matthews signing a three-year, entry-level contract that included the maximum allocation of performance bonuses. Lamoriello said that the contract was negotiated within ten minutes of sitting down with Matthews' agent, Pat Brisson, and that the deal was done "the Toronto way." Brisson would later confirm that the two parties did not have any issues negotiating the contract. The contract was identical in value to those McDavid and Eichel had signed one year earlier. Two weeks later, Matthews was given the NLA Youngster of the Year award, reserved for the league's top rookie. It was his fifth award from his stint in Switzerland.

Matthews made his NHL debut in the Maple Leafs' first game of the 2016–17 season on October 12, 2016, against the Ottawa Senators. He scored four goals in the game, all against Senators' goaltender Craig Anderson. This was the first time in modern NHL history a player scored four goals in his debut; previously, Joe Malone and Harry Hyland scored five goals each in their NHL debuts on December 19, 1917 (the first game in the history of the NHL). Four others had scored three goals since then. Matthews' jersey went on sale following his debut, and it quickly became the highest-selling jersey in the NHL. Two months later, in the NHL Centennial Classic against the Detroit Red Wings, Matthews scored the game-winning goal in overtime, securing a 5–4 victory for the Maple Leafs. He was named NHL's Rookie of the Month for December after leading all rookies with eight goals and 12 points in 12 games. On January 10, 2017, Matthews was the only Leafs player selected to participate in the 2017 NHL All-Star Game. On March 28, 2017, Matthews scored his 35th goal of the season, surpassing Wendel Clark's previous record for most goals in a season (34) by a Leafs' rookie. April 3 saw Matthews score his 39th goal and 67th point, breaking the franchise record for most points in a season, as well as the record for most goals by an American-born rookie. A few days later, he scored his 40th goal of the season, becoming the second rookie since the 2004–05 lockout to reach the milestone and the fourth teenager in NHL history to do so. He finished the year with 40 goals, second-most in the NHL. Matthews' play assisted the Maple Leafs in making the playoffs for the first time in a full 82 game season since 2004, as the team narrowly qualified for the playoffs by finishing as the eighth and final seed in the Eastern Conference. The team played the back-to-back Presidents' Trophy-winning Washington Capitals in the first round of the 2017 playoffs. After going pointless in the first two games of the series, Matthews scored in each of the last four games as the team was eliminated in six games by the Capitals. His four consecutive games with a goal marked the first time since 1986 that a teenager scored in four straight playoff games, when Wendel Clark did it, also with Toronto. Matthews was also the only NHL rookie since the Winnipeg Jets' Teemu Selänne in 1992–93 to record at least one shot on goal in all 82 regular season games. In recognition for his accomplishments throughout the year, Matthews was awarded the Calder Memorial Trophy as the NHL's top rookie, with 164 of 167 first-place votes. He was the first Maple Leafs' rookie to receive the trophy in 50 years since Brit Selby in 1966.

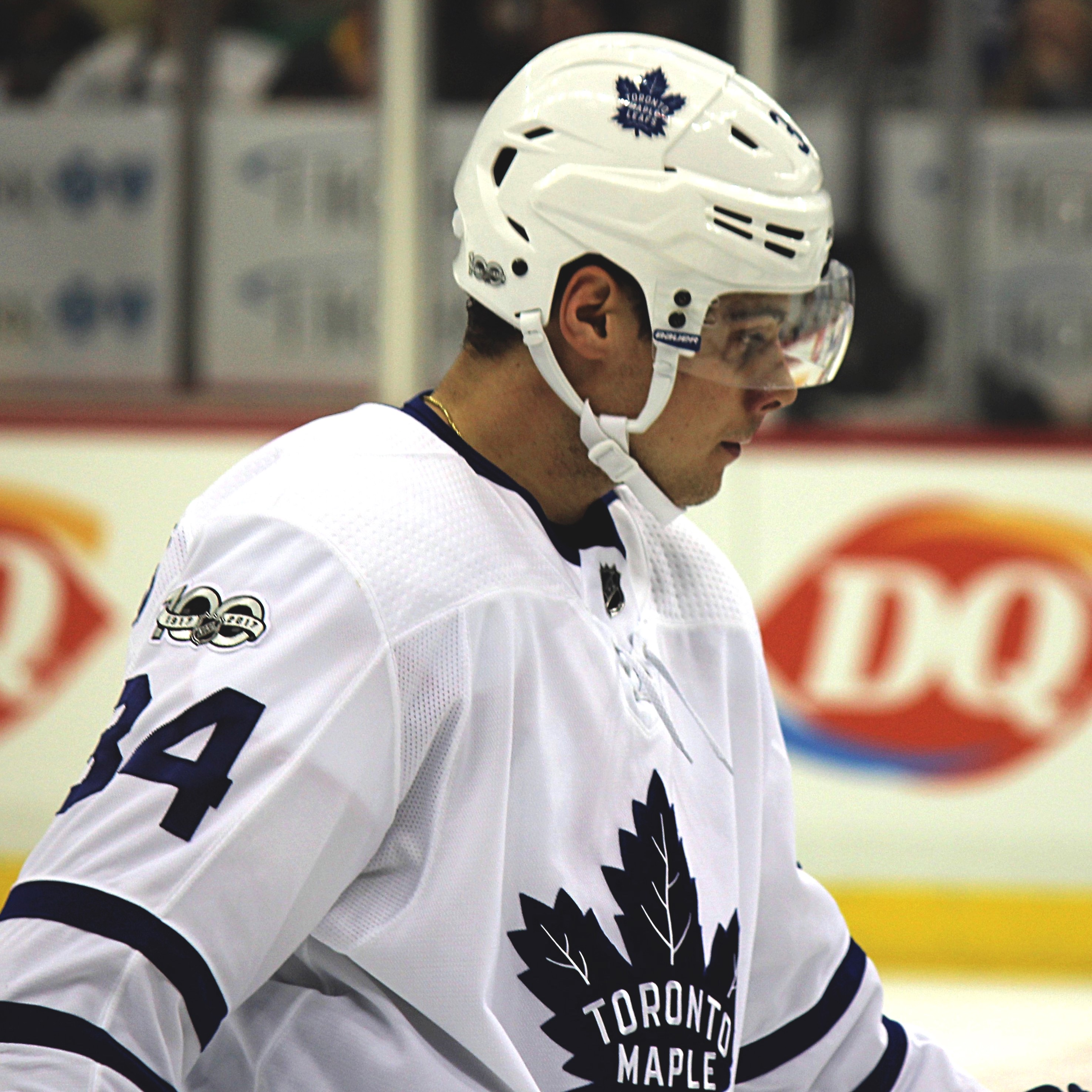
Matthews during a game against the Pittsburgh Penguins, December 2017

Matthews set the unofficial NHL record for most consecutive games with a shot on goal to start a career. His 103-game streak ended in a 4–1 victory over the Calgary Flames on November 28, 2017. On December 9, after colliding with teammate Morgan Rielly during a game against the Pittsburgh Penguins, Matthews missed six games to recover from a concussion. On January 10, 2018, Matthews was selected as the sole Maple Leaf to participate in the 2018 NHL All-Star Game. On February 24, it was revealed that Matthews had suffered a shoulder injury and would be out for at least ten days. However, he did not return to the Toronto lineup until March 22, where he scored a goal in the second period to help the Leafs win 5–2 over the Nashville Predators. Despite missing 20 games, Matthews finished the regular season with 34 goals and averaged over one point per game. The Maple Leafs qualified for the Stanley Cup playoffs for the second consecutive season having finished the 2017–18 season as the sixth seed in the East but were eliminated in the first round in seven games by the third seeded Boston Bruins. He was not particularly productive individually in his second playoff run, finishing with one goal and one assist in all seven games.

The Maple Leafs opened their 2018–19 season on October 3, 2018, against the Montreal Canadiens. In that game, Matthews scored the team's first goal along with the overtime-winning goal in a 3–2 win on Canadiens' goaltender Carey Price. After recording five goals and three assists through the first three games of the season, Matthews was named the NHL's First Star of the Week on October 9. His points streak continued, recording four goals over the next two games for a total of 12 points in five games. He became the youngest player in NHL history to record five multi-point games to open the season, breaking a record set by Wayne Gretzky in 1983. He continued his goal streak the next game against the Washington Capitals. In scoring his tenth goal of the season, Matthews became only the fifth player since the 1943–44 season to record ten goals in his team's first six games of the season. On October 27, after being hit by Winnipeg Jets defenseman Jacob Trouba in a 3–2 Maple Leafs win, Matthews sustained a left shoulder injury and was set to be sidelined for at least four weeks. After missing 14 games, Matthews returned to the lineup on November 28 against the San Jose Sharks; he recorded two goals and one assist in Toronto's 5–3 win. On December 27, Matthews was voted as captain of the Atlantic Division in the 2019 National Hockey League All-Star Game. While it was his first year as a captain, it was Matthews' third All-Star selection. On February 5, 2019, Matthews signed a new five-year, $58.17 million contract with Toronto worth an average annual value of $11.634 million, effective from the 2019–20 season. He later scored his 100th and 101st NHL goal on February 14, becoming the third-fastest Maple Leaf who began their career in Toronto to reach the milestone and the first since 1933. Matthews reached the 30-goal mark for the third consecutive season on February 25, 2019, after scoring in a 5–3 win over the Buffalo Sabres. In doing so, he became the first Maple Leaf to score at least 30 goals in each of his first three seasons. Matthews finished the 2018–19 season with a career-high 73 points in 68 games to finish third in team scoring behind Mitch Marner (94) and John Tavares (88), both of whom also finished with career-highs in points while the Maple Leafs finished the season as the sixth seed in the East for second consecutive season. In the first round 2019 playoffs, Matthews set a playoff career-high with five goals and six points in all seven games. However, the Maple Leafs were eliminated by the third seeded Boston Bruins in seven games for the second straight season, surrendering a 3–2 series lead in the process this time around.

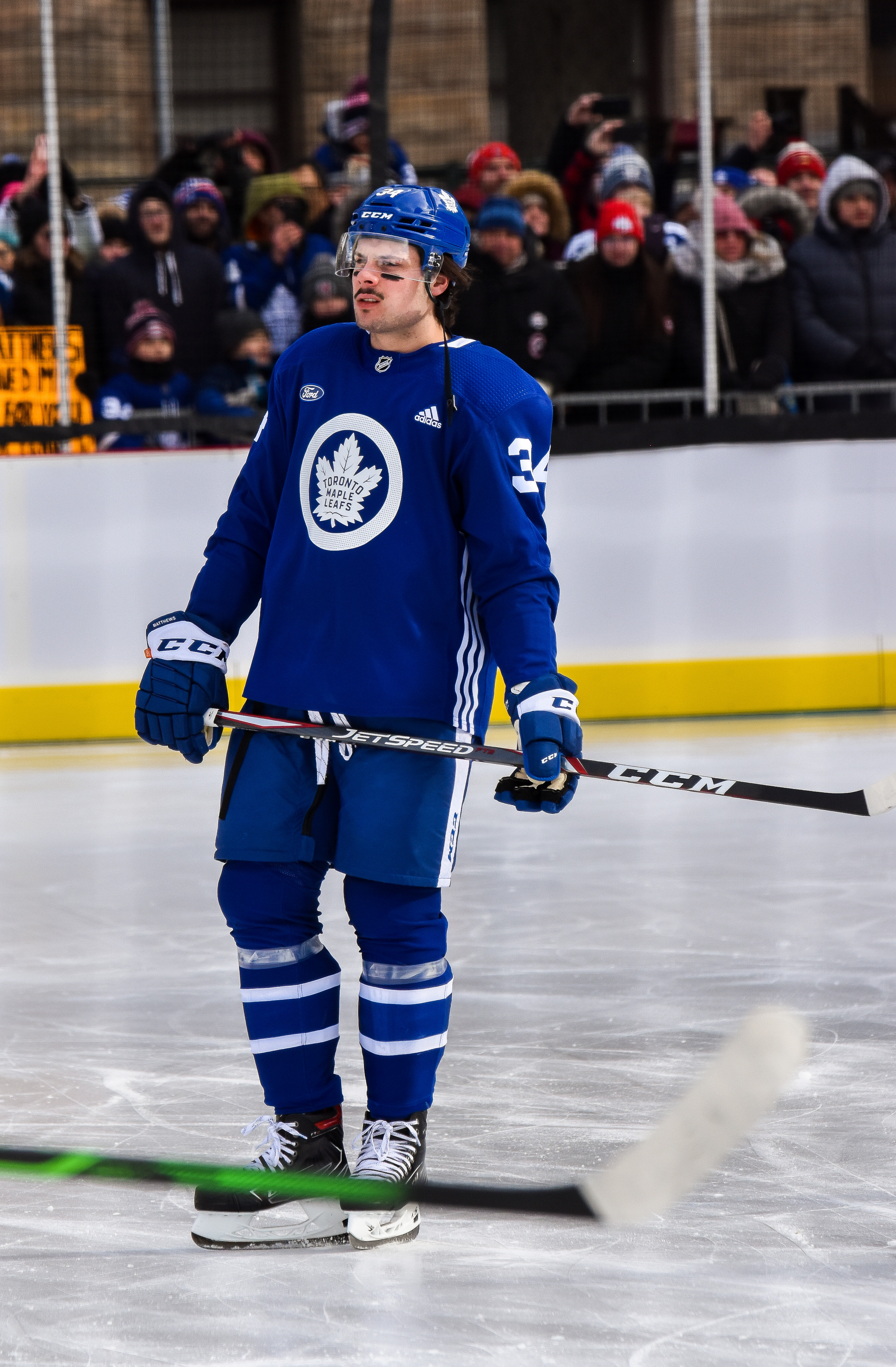
Matthews taking part in the Maple Leafs' outdoor practice, January 2020

At the start of the 2019–20 season, Matthews was named an alternate captain for the Maple Leafs. He scored two goals in the season opener against the Ottawa Senators on October 3, 2019, becoming the fourth player in NHL history to score in each of their first four season openers. As of that game, Matthews ranked third in the NHL with 116 goals in 215 games since making his debut in 2016. On October 7, Matthews was named the third NHL Star of the Week. He was then named to his fourth straight All-Star appearance, but due to an "ongoing wrist condition," he would not participate in the festivities; he was replaced by Senators winger Brady Tkachuk. Matthews would finish the abbreviated regular season with career-highs in goals (47) (a 55-goal pace in a full 82 game campaign) and 43 assists for 80 points. His 47 goals placed him second in the league, one goal behind Washington Capitals winger and captain Alexander Ovechkin and Boston Bruins winger David Pastrňák for the league lead. The season ended in disappointment for Matthews and the Leafs, losing in the best-of-five qualifying round against the Columbus Blue Jackets. Matthews scored twice in the five-game series, including the overtime winner to cap off an improbable three-goal rally in the last five minutes of game 4.

==== Upsurge, Hart Trophy and Rocket Richard Trophy seasons (2020–2024) ====
Due to the ongoing COVID-19 pandemic and resultant limitations on cross-border travel, the 2020–21 season occurred under a vastly different arrangement than normal, with the Leafs grouped in an all-Canadian North Division and playing exclusively within that division for the season. The shortened 2020–21 season was Matthews' most successful to date, recording 41 goals in 56 games (a 60-goal pace over a full 82 game season), and 66 total points. He became the first Maple Leaf to win the Maurice "Rocket" Richard Trophy, awarded to the player who scored the most goals in the regular season. He was also the first American winner and the second to lead the NHL in goals. He was subsequently named as a finalist for the Hart Memorial Trophy, awarded by the Professional Hockey Writers' Association to the league's most valuable player; he was the first Leaf finalist since Doug Gilmour in 1993. Matthews ultimately finished second in Hart voting behind Connor McDavid. The Maple Leafs finished first in the North Division and faced the Montreal Canadiens in the first round of the 2021 playoffs, where they were considered the heavy favourites to win, which would have been the team's first playoff series win since 2004. The Leafs lost the first game of the series but won the next three to take a seeming stranglehold with a 3–1 series lead. However, they went on to lose the next three games, and thus the lose the series 4–3. In a personal disappointment for Matthews, he only recorded one goal and four assists in the Maple Leafs' fifth-straight early exit.

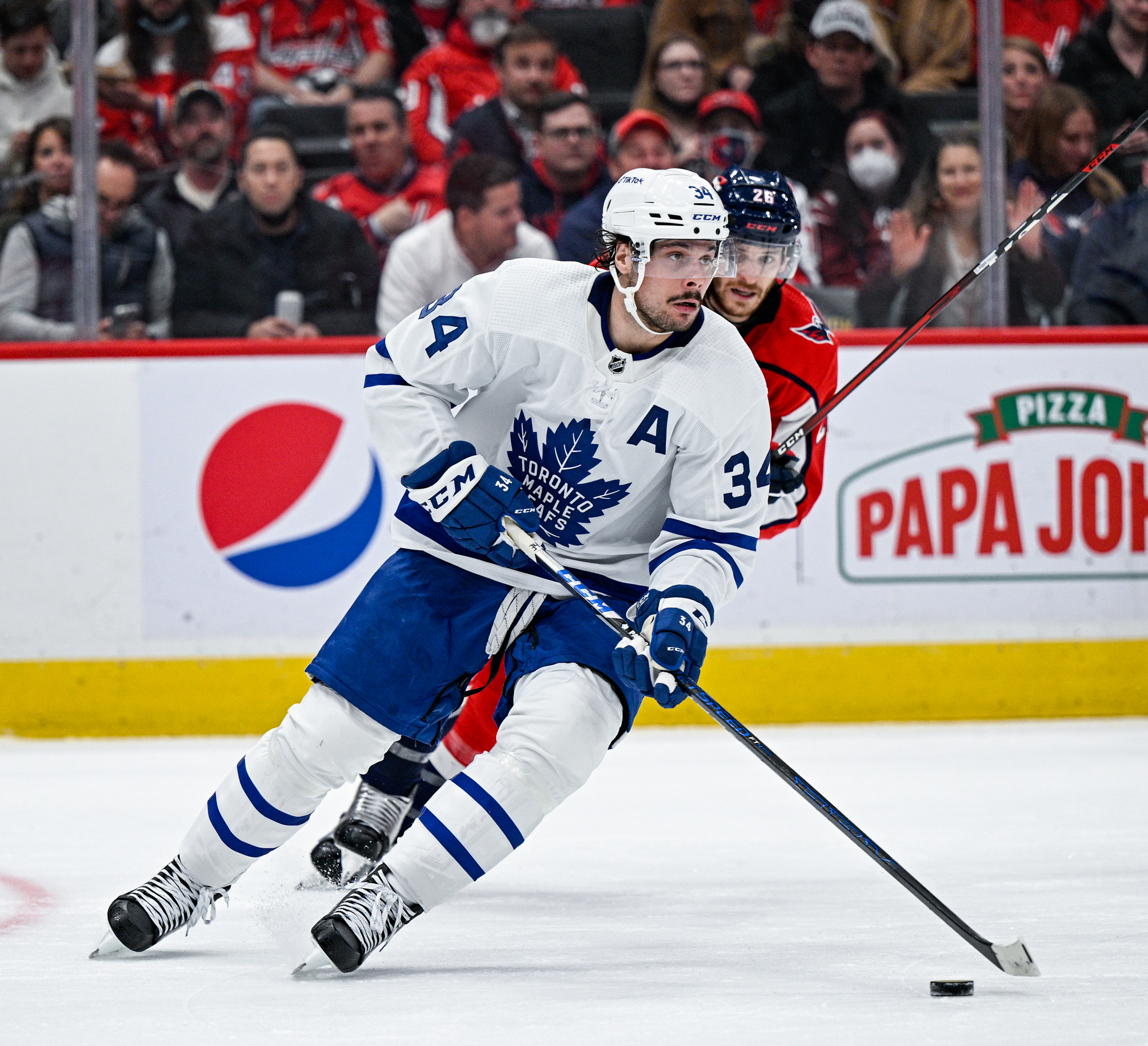
Matthews with the puck being chased down by Washington Capitals forward Nic Dowd during a game, February 2022

On August 13, 2021, Matthews underwent wrist surgery after experiencing discomfort in training, and it was announced he would miss six weeks. He returned to practice the last week of September. Due to the injury recovery, Matthews missed the first three games of the 2021–22 season. Upon his return, he was slow to start, notching only one goal in his first six games, the worst season-opening pace of his career. However, after this, he began scoring at a prodigious pace, eventually overtaking Edmonton Oilers center Leon Draisaitl to lead the NHL in goal-scoring by the midpoint of the season. New linemate Michael Bunting remarked "he's the best player in the league. That's just my opinion. Some people might say it's biased. But in my opinion, he's the best player by far." Matthews' achievements began to raise discussions of him as a possible frontrunner for the Hart Memorial Trophy. On March 14, 2022, Matthews was suspended for two games after crosschecking Buffalo Sabres defenseman Rasmus Dahlin at the 2022 Heritage Classic the day before. On March 31, Matthews scored an empty net goal in a 7–3 Maple Leafs victory over the Winnipeg Jets, reaching 50 goals in a season for the first time in his career. He was only the fourth Maple Leafs player to achieve this, and the first to do so since Dave Andreychuk in the 1993–94 season. He also set a franchise record for the fewest games necessary to score 50, having done so in 62 games. Days later, Matthews scored his seventh career hat-trick in an April 4 game against the Tampa Bay Lightning and tied the franchise record for goals in a season (54), set by Rick Vaive in 1981–82. This also marked the highest goal total for an NHL player in a single season since Tampa Bay Lightning center and captain Steven Stamkos' 60-goal 2011–12 campaign. His scoring spree continued, and in a game against the Dallas Stars on April 7, he first surpassed Vaive's record with his 55th goal of the season in the second period, and then set a new NHL record for most goals in a single season by a United States-born player when he scored his 56th and game-winning goal in overtime, beating the previous record jointly held by Jimmy Carson and Kevin Stevens. In his next game on April 9 against the Montreal Canadiens he scored his 57th and 58th goals of the season, passing Frank Mahovlich for the most even-strength goals in a season by a Maple Leaf, and becoming the first player to score 51 goals in a span of 50 games (at any point during a season) since Mario Lemieux achieved the feat in the 1995–96 season. He reached 100 points in a single season for the first time in his career on April 14. In a game against the Detroit Red Wings on April 26, Matthews scored his 59th and 60th goals of the season, becoming the first player in Maple Leafs history to score 60 goals in a season, and only the third in the post-2004–05 lockout NHL to score 60 or more, alongside Stamkos and Alexander Ovechkin, the latter who set the modern record with 65 in 2007–08. This secured his second straight Rocket Richard Trophy and second in his career altogether, joining Ovechkin and Pavel Bure as the only players to win it consecutively. Matthews was later named a finalist for the Hart Memorial Trophy and Ted Lindsay Award, both for the second consecutive year; Edmonton Oilers center and captain Connor McDavid was a finalist alongside Matthews for both awards, as were New York Rangers goaltender Igor Shesterkin and Nashville Predators defenseman and captain Roman Josi for the Hart and Ted Lindsay, respectively. He finished the season having played 73 games and scored 60 goals, 46 assists and 106 points, all of which were career highs while the Maple Leafs as a team finished as the fourth seed in the East. Advancing into the 2022 playoffs, Matthews and the Maple Leafs drew the two time defending Stanley Cup champion and fifth seeded Tampa Bay Lightning in the first round. Matthews scored twice in the Leafs' 5–0 win in game one, and also scored the game-winning goal as the Leafs came from behind to win game five, 4–3 for a 3–2 series lead. He led all skaters in the series with four goals, five assists and nine points, and 32 hits in the seven-game series. Despite Matthews' career-best playoff output, the Leafs failed to make it past the first round yet again, marking the franchise's eighth consecutive playoff series loss losing game six and seven after initially having a 3–2 series lead. On June 21, Matthews was named the winner of both the Hart Trophy and Ted Lindsay Award, receiving 119 Hart first-place votes to runner-up McDavid's 29. He was the first Leafs player to win the Lindsay, and the third to win the Hart – the first to do so in 67 years. He also finished in the top 10 in voting for the Lady Byng Trophy for sportsmanlike conduct, and the Selke Trophy for his defensive play.

Despite scoring at a slower pace in the first half of the season, on January 3, 2023, Matthews became the fastest Leafs player to register 500 career points in a game against the St. Louis Blues. He missed three weeks of play in January and February as the result of a knee injury, and would subsequently admit that he had been dealing with complications from a hand injury for most of the season. Upon his return from injury, Matthews' play was observed to have noticeably improved. On March 25, he recorded 15 shots on goal in a game against the Carolina Hurricanes, tying Dave Andreychuk's franchise record and becoming one of only seven players in league history to register at least that many in one game. The Maple Leafs finished second in the Atlantic Division, third in the Eastern Conference and fourth in the league, setting up a second consecutive first-round meeting with the Tampa Bay Lightning. The Leafs were commonly seen as the frontrunners at the beginning of the series being the higher seeded team; however, the historical record of past failures in advancing beyond the first round since 2004 was widely recognized. Many suggested that the outcome of the series would have major ramifications for the team going forward, including the status of both general manager Kyle Dubas and head coach Sheldon Keefe, and also for the prospect of Matthews re-signing in Toronto, which he would become eligible to do in the summer. Matthews scored five goals and four assists in the six-game series and participated in his first career fight against Lightning center and captain Steven Stamkos in game three, which saw the Leafs defeat the sixth seeded Lightning four games to two and advance to the second round for the first time since 2004. Reflecting on his first several years of first round playoff disappointments, he said afterward that "just to get over that hump, it's huge mentally for us, just to get that monkey off the back. And you don't want to look back now." In the following series against the eighth seeded Florida Panthers, Matthews and the Leafs struggled and were eliminated comparatively quickly; Matthews notched only two assists as the Leafs fell in the series in five games ending the 2023 playoffs altogether with five goals and six assists for 11 points in all 11 games.

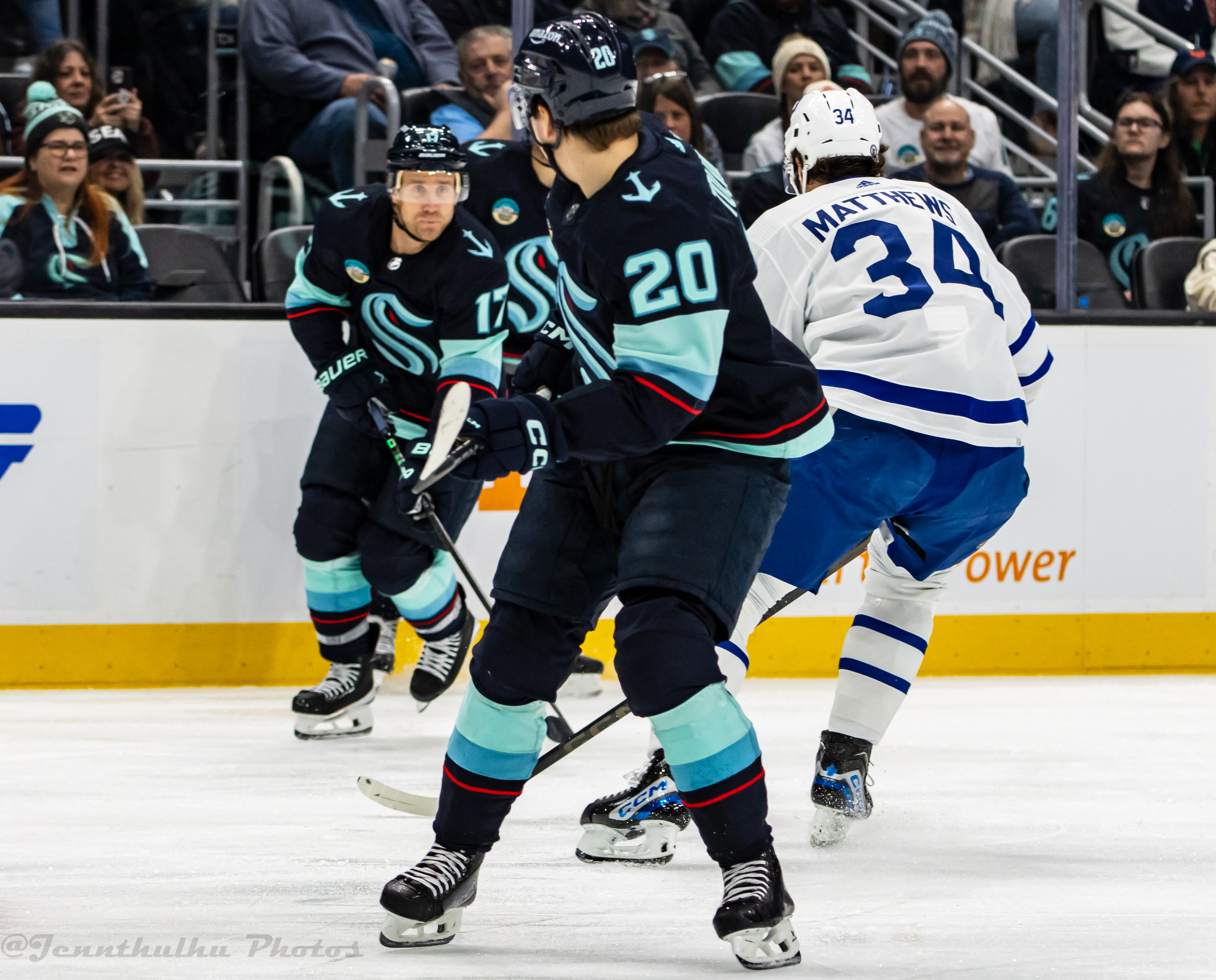
Matthews skates in front of Seattle Kraken forward Jaden Schwartz during a game, January 2024

On August 23, 2023, Matthews signed a four-year contract extension with an average annual salary worth $13.25 million. That October, Matthews began the 2023–24 season by scoring his eighth career hat trick, as the Maple Leafs defeated the Canadiens 6–5 in a shootout. Matthews scored another hat trick the following game in a 7–4 Leafs victory over the Minnesota Wild, becoming the first player to score back-to-back hat tricks at the start of the season since Ovechkin achieved the feat in the first two games of the 2017–18 season in October 2017. Matthews was elected one of four team captains to draft a team in the 2024 All-Star Game hosted in Toronto in February 2024. Team captains were paired alongside celebrities at that year's All-Star Game tournament; Matthews was paired up with alternate captain Rielly and Canadian pop singer Justin Bieber. In the first game, Team Matthews played against Team Hughes, where they claimed victory after a shootout. Moving on to the finals against Team McDavid, the two teams were tied after one period, but Team Matthews dominated the second half of the match as they won the tournament. Matthews was awarded the All-Star Game MVP, becoming the fifth Maple Leaf to capture the award overall, and the first in 33 years to do so. Matthews continued to score at a torrid pace as the season went on. By the end of the Maple Leafs' 54th game of the season on February 21, 2024 against the Arizona Coyotes, Matthews had already climbed to 51 goals with a two-goal game, by far the fastest pace to reach the 50-goal mark by an American player. The previous record pace for an American player to score 50 was 62 games, set by Kevin Stevens with the 1992–93 Pittsburgh Penguins. On March 30, 2024, he became the ninth player in NHL history to have multiple 60-goal seasons as the Leafs defeated the Buffalo Sabres 3–0. He recorded his 100th point of the season with his 64th goal of the season against the Montreal Canadiens, marking the second 100-point season of his career, on April 6, 2024; three nights later, he broke Ovechkin's salary cap-era record by scoring his 66th goal in a 5–2 win over the New Jersey Devils, securing the distinction of being the first NHL player in 28 years to score more than 65 goals in a single season. The last time such an accomplishment was achieved was during the 1995-96 NHL season by Mario Lemieux, who scored 69 goals that season, as Matthews would go on to match Lemieux's accomplishment by scoring a total of 69 goals as the season drew to a close and captured his third career Rocket Richard Trophy. Matthews would also record a goal and three assists for four points in five games as the Maple Leaf would get ousted once more in the opening round of the 2024 playoffs in seven games to the Boston Bruins.

==== Captaincy (2024–present) ====
On August 14, 2024, the Maple Leafs named Matthews as the 26th captain in franchise history, succeeding John Tavares. Matthews is the franchise’s first American-born captain. On April 15, 2025, Matthews scored his 400th career goal in a game against the Buffalo Sabres, becoming the sixth-fastest player to reach the mark. He finished the season with 33 goals and 45 assists for 78 points in 67 games. In the 2025 playoffs, the Maple Leafs defeated the Ottawa Senators four games to two in the first round. In the second round they lost in seven games to the defending Stanley Cup champions the Florida Panthers. In game six, Matthews scored the game winning goal in a 2–0 win to take the series to seven games, which they would lose 6–1.

On January 3, 2026, Matthews scored his 421st goal, passing Mats Sundin as the all-time leading goal scorer for the Maple Leafs. On March 13, following a hit from Anaheim Ducks defenseman Radko Gudas, where Matthews took a direct knee-on-knee hit to his left leg, it was announced that Matthews would be out for the remainder of the season due to a tear of his MCL. Matthews' teammates lack of response to Gudas' season-ending injury of their captain during the game caused a notable controversy in Toronto for the remainder of the season, which led to some more physical play from the team as the season drew to a close, including teammate Max Domi fighting Gudas at the opening faceoff in a Ducks-Maple Leafs rematch on March 30 which featured the head of the NHL's Department of Player Safety (George Parros) in attendance given expected heightened tensions. Despite this, the Maple Leafs bottomed out in the standings as the season drew to a close to miss the playoffs for the first time in Matthews' career. Matthews finished the season with 53 points (27 goals, 26 assists) in 60 games.

== International play ==
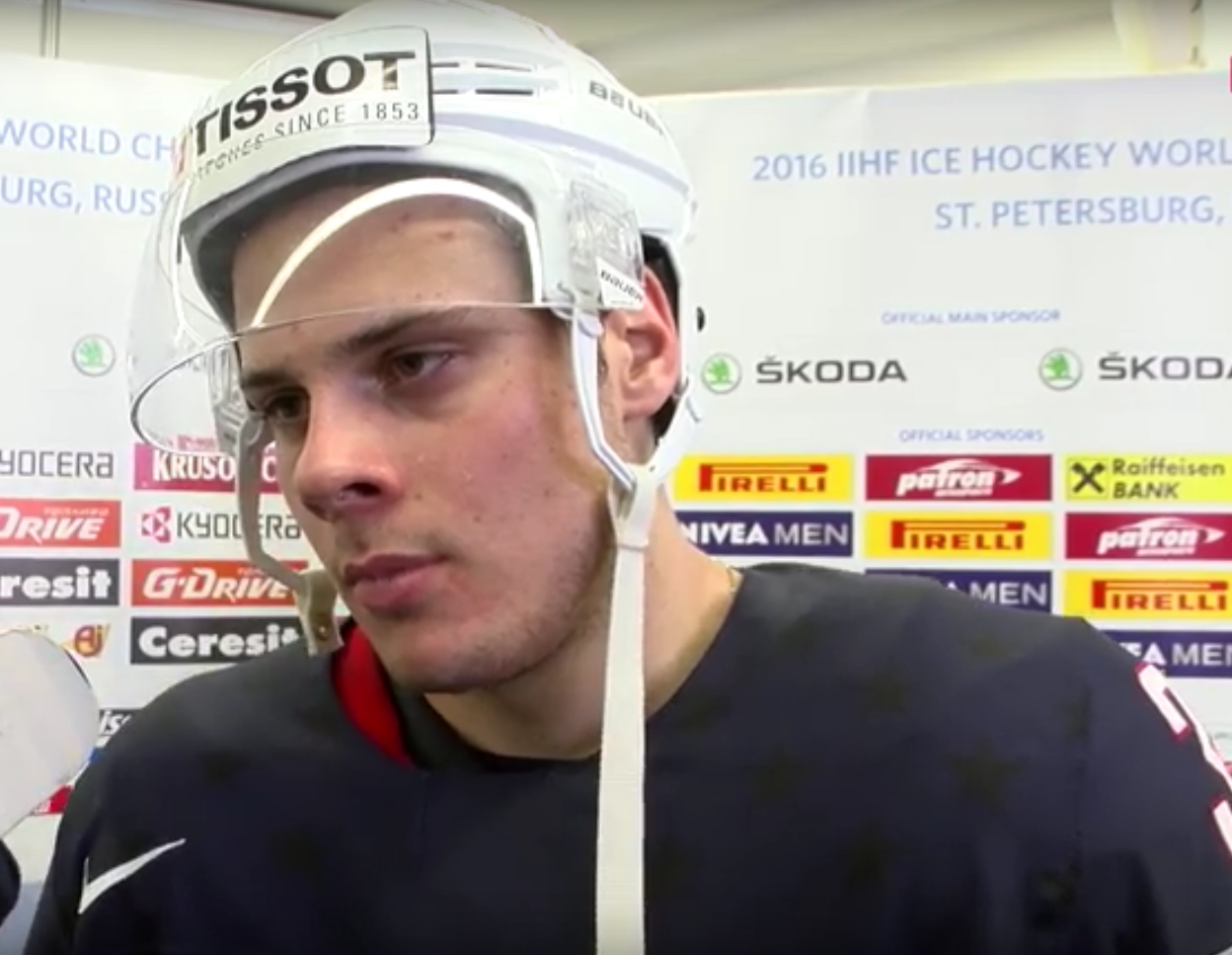
- Matthews with the United States during the 2016 World Championship

Medal record

Men's ice hockey

Representing the United States

Olympic Games
Gold medal – first place	2026 Milano Cortina	

4 Nations Face-Off
Runner-up	2025 Canada/United States	

World Junior Championships
Bronze medal – third place	2016 Finland	

World U18 Championship
Gold medal – first place	2015 Switzerland	
Gold medal – first place	2014 Finland	

World U-17 Hockey Challenge
Gold medal – first place	2014 Canada	

Matthews helped lead the United States under-18 team to gold at the 2014 World U18 Championship. He did so again in the 2015 edition, leading the tournament in scoring and being named the most valuable player (MVP), as well as earning the top forward slot on the Media All-Star Team. He was also named to the roster for the 2015 Deutschland Cup, but was forced to pull out of the tournament due to a back injury.

At the 2016 World Junior Championships, Matthews and Matthew Tkachuk each recorded 11 points to lead the United States junior team in scoring. After losing in the semifinals, the United States defeated Sweden to win the bronze medal. His seven goals in the tournament were one short of Jeremy Roenick's American record of eight, which was set in 1989. In recognition of his play, Matthews was named to the tournament All-Star Team. Later that year, Matthews played with the United States senior team at the 2016 World Championship, during which he led the team in points.

Later in 2016, Matthews was announced as a member of Team North America for the 2016 World Cup of Hockey. He began the pre-tournament games as a left wing on the third line, playing alongside Ryan Nugent-Hopkins and Nathan MacKinnon. After impressing, he began the tournament on the top line with Jack Eichel and Connor McDavid. The three found chemistry, but were unable to help North America to a medal finish. Matthews finished the tournament with three points in three games played. Following the Toronto Maple Leafs' first-round elimination in the 2017 playoffs, he was advised by the team to forego participating in the 2017 World Championship and to rest instead.

In January 2025, Matthews was announced as the captain of the United States team for the 4 Nations Face-Off. Missing one game due to injury, he played a total of three games, including in the finals against Canada. Across those games, he had just three points, all of them being assists. The United States was the runner-up in the tournament after losing to Canada 2–3 in overtime.

On June 16, 2025, Matthews was one of six players named to the United States' preliminary roster for the 2026 Winter Olympics. On February 8, 2026, he was named captain of the team's final 25-player roster. On February 22, 2026, he led Team USA to capture their third men's ice hockey Olympic gold medal, beating the Canadian team (and former long-term teammate Mitch Marner) in a 2–1 overtime win. This was also the first gold medal for the U.S. team since 1980. Amid backlash faced by the men's Olympic hockey team regarding the inclusion of FBI director Kash Patel during their gold medal celebrations and members of the team laughing at President Trump's comments of being impeached if he did not invite the women's team to the White House, Matthews was among the majority who visited with the president, calling it "an incredible honor". Matthews later told reporters that there is shared respect and excitement between both teams.

== Personal life ==
Matthews comes from a family of athletes, with his father having played college baseball and with an uncle, Wes Matthews, who briefly played in the National Football League for the Miami Dolphins. His father is the chief technology officer of a manufacturing company based in New Jersey. He has two sisters: Alexandria, who is three years older, and Breyana, who is five years younger. Due to his mother's Mexican ancestry, Matthews can speak some Spanish.

Off the ice, Matthews was enrolled in several online courses with the University of Nebraska Omaha. In late August 2016, he moved to Toronto and began working out with teammates Mitch Marner and Morgan Rielly. Matthews' favorite athlete growing up was Kobe Bryant, while his favorite sports movie is The Mighty Ducks. He is a fan of players Jonathan Toews and Anže Kopitar due to their all around offensive and defensive game, and has had his playing style compared to them. In recognition of Matthews' four-goal NHL debut, rap artist SVDVM released a song titled "Auston Matthews." At the 2019 NHL Awards, Matthews was named the cover athlete for EA Sports' ice hockey video game NHL 20 and later NHL 22.

On June 19, 2020, the Toronto Sun reported that Matthews had tested positive for COVID-19 while at home in Scottsdale, Arizona before the start of training camp. Due to privacy concerns, the Toronto Maple Leafs did not comment on Matthews' condition regarding COVID-19. However, on July 13, 2020, the first day of training camp, Matthews confirmed with reporters that he did contract the virus and that he was "mostly asymptomatic."

During the 2020 lockdown, Matthews lived in his hometown of Scottsdale, Arizona, with Frederik Andersen. He also got his dog, a Miniature Bernedoodle named Felix, during lockdown.

== Career statistics ==
=== Regular season and playoffs ===
Bold indicates led league

			Regular season					Playoffs
Season	Team	League	GP	G	A	Pts	PIM	GP	G	A	Pts	PIM
2013–14	US NTDP Juniors	USHL	20	10	10	20	4	—	—	—	—	—
2013–14	US NTDP U17	USDP	24	12	21	33	10	—	—	—	—	—
2013–14	US NTDP U18	USDP	20	12	5	17	8	—	—	—	—	—
2014–15	US NTDP Juniors	USHL	24	20	28	48	10	—	—	—	—	—
2014–15	US NTDP U18	USDP	60	55	62	117	30	—	—	—	—	—
2015–16	ZSC Lions	NLA	36	24	22	46	6	4	0	3	3	2
2016–17	Toronto Maple Leafs	NHL	82	40	29	69	14	6	4	1	5	0
2017–18	Toronto Maple Leafs	NHL	62	34	29	63	12	7	1	1	2	0
2018–19	Toronto Maple Leafs	NHL	68	37	36	73	12	7	5	1	6	2
2019–20	Toronto Maple Leafs	NHL	70	47	33	80	8	5	2	4	6	0
2020–21	Toronto Maple Leafs	NHL	52	**41**	25	66	10	7	1	4	5	0
2021–22	Toronto Maple Leafs	NHL	73	**60**	46	106	18	7	4	5	9	0
2022–23	Toronto Maple Leafs	NHL	74	40	45	85	20	11	5	6	11	7
2023–24	Toronto Maple Leafs	NHL	81	**69**	38	107	20	5	1	3	4	2
2024–25	Toronto Maple Leafs	NHL	67	33	45	78	20	13	3	8	11	2
2025–26	Toronto Maple Leafs	NHL	60	27	26	53	18	—	—	—	—	—
NHL totals			689	428	352	780	152	68	26	33	59	13

=== International ===
Year	Team	Event	Result	GP	G	A	Pts	PIM
2014	United States	U17	1st place, gold medalist(s)	6	4	4	8	8
2014	United States	WJC18	1st place, gold medalist(s)	7	5	2	7	4
2015	United States	WJC18	1st place, gold medalist(s)	7	8	7	15	0
2015	United States	WJC	5th	5	1	2	3	4
2016	United States	WJC	3rd place, bronze medalist(s)	7	7	4	11	2
2016	United States	WC	4th	10	6	3	9	2
2016	Team North America	WCH	5th	3	2	1	3	0
2025	United States	4NF	2nd place, silver medalist(s)	3	0	3	3	0
2026	United States	OG	1st place, gold medalist(s)	6	3	4	7	4
Junior totals				32	25	19	44	18
Senior totals				22	11	11	22	6

== Awards and honors ==
Award	Year	Ref
USHL
USHL Third All-Star Team	2015	
NLA
Swiss Cup winner	2016	
NLA Rising Star Award	2016	
NLA Media All-Star Team	2016	
NLA Media Most Improved Player	2016	
NLA Youngster of the Year	2016	
NHL
NHL Rookie of the Month	December 2016	
NHL All-Star Game (*captain)	2017, 2018, 2019*, 2020, 2022*, 2023, 2024*	
NHL All-Star Game MVP	2024	
Calder Memorial Trophy	2017	
NHL All-Rookie Team	2017	
EA Sports NHL cover athlete	2020, 2022	
Maurice "Rocket" Richard Trophy	2021, 2022, 2024	
NHL Second All-Star Team	2021	
Hart Memorial Trophy	2022	
Ted Lindsay Award	2022	
NHL First All-Star Team	2022	
International
World U18 Championship most valuable player	2015	
World U18 Championship Media All-Star team	2015	
Bob Johnson Award	2015	
World U20 Championship All-Star team	2016	

=== Records ===
==== NHL ====
- Most goals scored in an NHL debut in the modern era (four goals), surpassing Alex Smart, Réal Cloutier, Fabian Brunnström and Derek Stepan (three goals).
- Most goals by an American-born rookie (40), surpassing Neal Broten who scored 38 goals in his rookie season with the Minnesota North Stars in the 1981–82 season.
- Most consecutive games with a shot on goal to start a career. His 103-game streak ended in a 4–1 victory over the Calgary Flames on November 28, 2017.
- Youngest player (age 21) to record multiple points in each of his team's first five games of a season, surpassing Wayne Gretzky (age 22).

==== Toronto Maple Leafs ====
- Most NHL goals in a season for the Maple Leafs, scoring 69 during the 2023–24 season, surpassing Rick Vaive who had 54 in the 1981–82 season.
- Fastest Maple Leafs player to score 25 goals (52 games), surpassed Howie Meeker (58 games in 1946–47).
- Most points by a rookie (69), surpassed Peter Ihnačák, who had 66 in the 1982–83 season.
- Most goals by a rookie (40), surpassed Wendel Clark, who had 34 in the 1985–86 season.
- Most consecutive 30 goals seasons to start a career (nine) beating the previous record of two.
- Fewest games necessary to score 50 goals in one season (55 in the 2023–24 season).
- Fastest Maple Leafs player to score 500 points (445 games), surpassed Daryl Sittler, who scored 500 points in 517 games.

== Filmography ==
Year	Title	Notes	Ref.
2020	Justin Bieber: Seasons	Guest appearance	
2021	All or Nothing: Toronto Maple Leafs	Self	

Awards and achievements
Preceded by Connor McDavid	NHL first overall draft pick 2016	Succeeded by Nico Hischier
Preceded by Mitch Marner	Toronto Maple Leafs first-round draft pick 2016	Succeeded by Timothy Liljegren
Preceded by Artemi Panarin	Calder Memorial Trophy; 2017	Succeeded by Mathew Barzal
Preceded by Alexander Ovechkin and David Pastrňák; Connor McDavid	Rocket Richard Trophy; 2021, 2022; 2024	Succeeded by Connor McDavid; Leon Draisaitl
Preceded by Connor McDavid	Hart Memorial Trophy; 2022	Succeeded by Connor McDavid
Preceded by Connor McDavid	Ted Lindsay Award; 2022	Succeeded by Connor McDavid
Sporting positions
Preceded by John Tavares	Toronto Maple Leafs captain 2024–present	Incumbent
