= Federal detention center =

Type of prison in the USA

Federal detention centers are pretrial detention facilities within the Bureau of Prisons. As administrative security level facilities, they are capable of holding inmates in all security categories. Thus, typically they have security measures such as double fences, roving patrols, and restricted movement. Agent Steal and others have noted that the conditions in the FDCs are generally better than in local jails.
