= Gardner (surname) =

- Coat of Arms of Baron Gardner (1800–1883).
- Pronunciation: /ˈɡɑːdnə/
- Language: English

Origin
- Languages: 1. Old French; 2. Old English
- Derivation: 1. gardinier 2. gar + dyn'
- Meaning: 1. "gardener" 2. "weapon" + "sound", "alarm"

Other names
- Variant forms: Gardyner; Gardener; Gardenar; Gardinier; Gardiner
- Cognates: Gairnéir; Gairdner
- Related names: Garner

Gardner is a surname of English, Scottish and Irish origin. Variant spellings include Gardyner, Gardener, Gardenar, Gardinier, Gardiner, and Gardner; the last two are the most common today.

Some of the earliest recorded uses of the name Gardner are Anger Gardiner (Lincolnshire, pre-1166), William le Gardinier (Rutland, 1199), Geoffrey le Gardiner (Oxfordshire, 1273), Richard le Gardiner (Cambridgeshire, 1273), Ralph le Gardener (Huntingdonshire, 1273), and Walter le Gardiner (London, 1292). Contemporaneous use of the surname features most prominently in Essex, Lancashire, Warwickshire, and Perthshire.

== History ==
Most sources attest that "Gardner" is an occupational surname from Middle English meaning "gardener", derived from the Old Norman word gardinier (French: jardinier). Some onomasticians attest an earlier origin from the Anglo-Saxon period attributed to the Old English word gar-dyn (meaning "warrior" or "one who bears arms"), a term whose roots are shared with the Gaelic word gairden ("enclosed or fortified place"). In spite of the latter, the Gaelic form of the surname used in Ireland following the Norman Conquest of England was Mac Gairnéir ("gardener").

There is a tradition held by some of the descendants of the Crusader William Gardiner (son of Benoni), son of George of Newport, that William won his crest at Acre in 1191, by chopping through the shoulder of a Saracen who was about to kill Richard Coeur de Lion or Richard the Lionheart, hence the Saracen's head on the coat of arms.

== A ==
- Adam Gardner (born 1973), American musician
- Alan Gardner (disambiguation)
- Alexander Gardner (disambiguation)
- Alford Gardner (1926–2024), Jamaican-born British Windrush generation emigrant
- Andrew Gardner (disambiguation)
- Andwele Gardner (born 1978), American R&B singer, rapper, songwriter and record producer
- Anna Gardner (1816–1901), American abolitionist, poet, teacher
- Anthony Gardner (footballer) (born 1980), English footballer
- Anthony L. Gardner (born 1963), American diplomat
- Antony Gardner (1927–2011), British politician
- Archibald Gardner (1814–1902), American pioneer, businessman, and millwright
- Arthur Gardner (diplomat) (1889–1967), American diplomat
- Arthur Gardner (producer) (1910–2014), American film producer
- Arthur Duncan Gardner (1884–1977), British scientist
- Ashleigh Gardner (born 1997), Australian Cricketer
- Augustus Peabody Gardner (1865–1918), American politician from Massachusetts
- Ava Gardner (1922–1990), American actress

== B ==
- Beau Gardner (born 2001), American football player
- Berta Gardner (born 1954), member of the Alaska House of Representatives
- Bertie Charles Gardner (1884–1973), Canadian banker
- Bill Gardner (politician) (born 1948), American politician from New Hampshire
- Billy Gardner (1927–2024), American baseball player and coach
- Bob Gardner, American politician
- Booth Gardner (1936–2013), American politician from Washington
- Brett Gardner (born 1983), American baseball player
- Brian Gardner, mastering engineer
- Bunk Gardner, American rock saxophonist
- Burgess Gardner (1936–2021), American jazz composer and musician
- Burleigh B. Gardner (1902–1985), American anthropologist
- Buzz Gardner (1930–2004), American trumpet and flugelhorn player

== C ==
- Catherine Gardner (born 1982), American actress
- Carl Gardner (1928–2011), American singer
- Charles J. Gardner (1843–1901), American politician
- Che Gardner (born 1999), English footballer
- Christine Gardner (21st century), American professor
- Cecil Gardner (1889–1918), English World War I flying ace
- Craig Shaw Gardner (born 1949), American author
- Charles Austin Gardner (1896–1970), Western Australian botanist
- Chris Gardner (born 1954), American businessman
- Colin Gardner (c. 1940–2010), English football official and philanthropist
- Cynthia Gardner, geologist and volcanologist

== D ==
- Dale Gardner (1948–2014), American astronaut
- Dan Gardner (author), Canadian author and academic
- Daniel Gardner (1750–1805), British painter
- Daniel Gardner (musician) (born 1980), Canadian electronic musician
- Daniel Gardner (cyclist) (born 1996), British cyclist
- David Gardner (disambiguation)
- Derrick Gardner (born 1965), American jazz trumpeter
- Derrick Gardner (American football) (born 1977), American football player
- Diana Gardner (1913–1997), English wood engraver and writer
- Don Gardner (1931–2018), American R&B singer-songwriter, drummer
- Don Gardner (American football) (born 1997), American football player
- Donald Stanley Gardner, American engineer
- Donald Yetter Gardner (1913–2004), American songwriter
- Dylan Gardner, Australian football player

== E ==
- Earle Gardner (1884–1943), American baseball player
- Edith Jordan Gardner (1877–1965), American educator
- Edward Gardner (disambiguation)
- Edwin M. Gardner (1845–1935), American painter
- Eliza Ann Gardner (1831–1922), abolitionist and religious leader
- Elizabeth Jane Gardner (1837–1922), American painter
- English Gardner (born 1992), American sprinter
- Erle Stanley Gardner (1889–1970), American author
- Ernest Arthur Gardner (1862–1939), English archaeologist
- Eugene C. Gardner (1836–1915), American architect

== F ==
- Jelly Gardner Floyd Gardner (1895–1977), baseball player
- Fay Webb-Gardner (1885–1969), American politician from North Carolina
- Floyd M. Gardner, author of Phaselock Techniques
- Frances Gardner (1913–1989), English cardiologist
- Frank Gardner (driver) (1931–2009), Australian racing driver
- Frank Gardner (journalist) (born 1961), British television journalist
- Frank "Sprig" Gardner (1907–1975), American wrestling coach
- Fred Gardner (activist), American activist
- Fred Gardner (cricketer) (1922–1979), English cricketer
- Frederick D. Gardner (1869–1933), American politician from Missouri
- Freddy Gardner (1910–1950), British jazz and dance band musician

== G ==
- Gavin F. Gardner (1848–1919), Australian co-founder of the Adelaide Stock Exchange
- George Gardiner (settler) (1608/1615 – c. 1677) of Rhode Island
- Geoffrey Robert Gardner (born 1960), Australian politician
- George Gardner (disambiguation), several people
- Georgia Gardner (born 1944), American politician
- Georgie Gardner (born 1965), Australian newsreader
- Gerald Gardner (1884–1964), English occultist and founding father of Wicca
- Gerald Gardner (mathematician) (1926–2009), American mathematician
- Gerald Gardner (writer) (1929–2020), American screenwriter
- Greg Gardner (born 1975), Canadian ice hockey player and coach
- Guy Gardner (astronaut) (born 1948), American astronaut

== H ==
- Harry Gardner (cricketer) (1890–1939), English cricketer and army officer
- Heather B. (Gardner), American hip-hop artiste
- Heidi Gardner (born 1983), American comedian and actress
- Heidi K. Gardner, American organizational researcher
- Helen Gardner (critic) (1909–1986), English literary critic
- Helen Gardner (art historian) (1878–1946), American art historian
- Helen Gardner (actress) (1884–1968), American film actress
- Henry J. Gardner (1819–1892), American politician from Massachusetts
- Herb Gardner (1934–2003), American cartoonist, playwright and screenwriter
- Hiram Gardner (1800–1874), American lawyer and politician from New York
- Howard Gardner (born 1943), American psychologist
- Hy Gardner (1908–1989), American columnist and television presenter

== I ==
- Ian Gardner, Canadian boxer
- Isabella Gardner (1915–1981), American poet
- Isabella Stewart Gardner (1840–1924), American art collector

== J ==
- Jack Gardner (disambiguation), various persons
- James Alan Gardner (born 1955), Canadian science fiction author
- James Alton Gardner (1943–1966) Medal of Honor awardee, Vietnam War
- James Knoll Gardner (1940–2017), American judge
- Jan Gardner (born 1956), American politician
- Jane F. Gardner (1934–2023), British academic
- Janice Gardner (1938–2017), American politician
- Jessica Gardner (born 1971), British librarian
- Jimmy Gardner (disambiguation)
- Joan Gardner (disambiguation)
- Joe C. Gardner (1944–2013), American politician
- John Gardner (disambiguation)
- Joseph Gardner (disambiguation)
- Josh Gardner (comedian) (born 1971), American comedian and writer
- Josh Gardner (soccer) (born 1982), American soccer player
- Joshua Gardner (sea captain), British sea captain
- Julian Gardner (poker player) (born 1978), English poker player
- Julie Gardner (born 1969), Welsh television producer

== K ==
- Katy Gardner, British novelist
- Kay Gardner (composer) (1942–2002), musician and composer

== L ==
- Larry Gardner (1886–1976), American baseball player
- Lauren Gardner (scientist), American epidemiologist
- Laurence Gardner, British writer
- Lawrence Gardner (died 1850) British engineer and founder of L Gardner and Sons Ltd
- Lee Gardner, American baseball player
- Lee Gardner (footballer), Scottish footballer
- Leonard Gardner (born 1933), American writer
- Lisa Gardner, American author
- Lloyd Gardner, American diplomatic historian

== M ==
- Margaret Elizabeth Gardner (1875–1942), American political hostess
- Mark Gardner (baseball player) (born 1962), American baseball player
- Mark Gardner (Australian rules footballer) (1884–?), Australian footballer
- Martha M. Gardner, American statistician
- Martin Gardner (1914–2010), American mathematics and science writer and magician
- Matilda Hall Gardner (1871–1954), American suffragist
- Maureen Gardner (1926–1974), British sprint hurdler
- Meredith Gardner (1912–2002), American linguist and cryptographer
- Mills Gardner (1830–1910), American attorney and politician
- Milton Eugene Gardner (1901–1986), American physicist
- Myron Gardner (born 2001), American basketball player

== N ==
- Nathaniel Lyon Gardner (1864–1937), American botanist

== O ==
- Obadiah Gardner (1852–1938), American politician
- Oliver Max Gardner (1882–1947), American politician from North Carolina

== P ==
- Paul Gardner (footballer) (born 1957), English footballer
- Percy Gardner (1846–1937), English classical archaeologist
- Philip John Gardner (1914–2003), English recipient of the Victoria Cross

== R ==
- Racin Gardner (born 1972), American auto racing driver
- Remy Gardner (born 1998), Australian motorcycle racer
- Randy Gardner (disambiguation)
- Rebekah Gardner (born 1990), American basketball player
- Ricardo Gardner (born 1978), Jamaican footballer
- Rich Gardner (born 1981), American football player
- Richard Gardner (disambiguation)
- Rita Gardner (1934–2022), American actress
- Rob Gardner (musician), American rock drummer
- Rob Gardner (baseball) (born 1944), baseball player
- Robert Gardner (anthropologist) (1925–2014), film director
- Robert Gardner (footballer) (died 1887), Scottish footballer
- Rod Gardner (born 1977), American football wide receiver
- Rod Gardner (politician) (born 1948), Canadian politician
- Ronnie Lee Gardner (1961–2010), American criminal executed by firing squad in Utah
- Ross Gardner (born 1985), English footballer
- Roy Gardner (bank robber) (1884–1940), American outlaw
- Sir Roy Gardner (businessman) (born 1945), Chairman of Manchester United
- Rua Gardner (1901–1972), New Zealand teacher and principal
- Rulon Gardner (born 1971), American Greco-Roman wrestler

== S ==
- Sam Gardner (soccer) (born 1997), Canadian soccer player
- Sauce Gardner (born 2000), American football player
- Scott Gardner, Australian writer
- Sheldon Gardner (1934–2005), American psychologist
- Stu Gardner, American musician and composer
- Sue Gardner (born 1967), executive director of the Wikimedia Foundation
- Sydney Gardner (1884–1965), Australian politician

== T ==
- Teddy Gardner (1922–1977), English boxer
- Thomas Gardner (disambiguation)
- Tom Gardner (born 1968), American financier
- Tony Gardner (born 1964), English actor
- Tony Gardner (designer) (born 1965), American makeup and special effects designer
- Trixie Gardner (1927–2024), British dentist and politician

== V ==
- Virginia Gardner (born 1995), American actress

== W ==
- Walter Everson Gardner (1873–1943), Australian mine manager
- Wayne Gardner (born 1959), Australian racing motorcyclist
- Wes Gardner (1961–2026), American baseball player
- William Gardner (disambiguation)

== Fictional characters ==
- Admiral Gardner, head of Starfleet in Star Trek: Enterprise
- Amy Gardner, a character in The West Wing
- Chauncey Gardner, Peter Sellers' character in Being There
- Edward Gardner, a character in the 1997 French-American fantasy drama film FairyTale: A True Story
- Guy Gardner (character), a DC Comics superhero
- Joe Gardner, the protagonist of Disney/Pixar film Soul.
- Marie-Grace Gardner, American Girl character from 1850s New Orleans
- Sam Gardner and his descendants, the Gardner family in The Lord of the Rings
- Téa Gardner, English name of Anzu Mazaki, a Yu-Gi-Oh! anime character
- Rachel Gardner, the protagonist of the game & Anime Angel of Death

== See also ==
- General Gardner (disambiguation)
- Justice Gardner (disambiguation)
- Senator Gardner (disambiguation)
- Gaertner
- Gardner (given name)
- Gardner (disambiguation)
- Gardiner (disambiguation)
