= Leonard Gardner (disambiguation) =

Leonard Gardner is an American novelist.

Leonard Gardner may also refer to:

- Len Gardner (1927 – 1990), Australian rules football player and umpire
- Len Gardner (footballer, born 1931)

== See also ==
- Gardner (given name)
- Gardner (surname)
- Gardner (disambiguation)
