= Gartner (surname) =

The surname "Gartner" is derived from the occupational name of a gardener or winemaker, and historically was primarily used by Germans, Slovenians, and Ashkenazi Jews.

People with the surname include:

- Carlo Gartner
- Chloe Gartner
- Christian Gartner (footballer)
- Daniel Gartner
- Franc Gartner
- Fred C. Gartner
- Gideon Gartner
- Hana Gartner
- Hermann Treschow Gartner
- Jo Gartner
- Joe Gartner
- John Gartner (disambiguation), several people
- Mahela Gartner
- Marianna Gartner
- Marianne Gartner
- Michael Gartner
- Mike Gartner
- Ray Gartner (rugby league)
- Renee Gartner
- Richard Gartner
- Robin Gartner
- Russel Gartner
- Theodor Gartner (1843-1925), Austrian linguist
- William Gartner
- Wolfgang Gartner
- Zsuzsi Gartner

== See also ==
- Gaertner, also Gärtner, a surname
- Gardner (surname)
- Gardiner (surname)
- Gartner, a technological research and consulting firm
