= Gardener (disambiguation) =

A gardener is a person involved in gardening.

Gardener may also refer to:

- Gardener (surname)
- Gardener (comics), Marvel Comics character
- The Gardener (disambiguation)
- Gardener 1NT, contract bridge convention

== See also ==
- Gardner (disambiguation)
- Gardiner (disambiguation)
