= Kate Allstadt =

American geologist and seismologist

- Education: Northeastern University (BS); IUSS ROSE School (MS); Joseph Fourier University (MS); University of Washington (PhD)
- Scientific career
- Workplaces: U.S. Geological Survey
- Website: usgs.gov/staff-profiles/kate-e-allstadt

Notes
- ORCID 0000-0003-4977-5248

Kate Elizabeth Allstadt is an American geologist and seismologist employed by the U.S. Geological Survey (USGS) who works out of Golden, Colorado. She is a self-described "present-day geologist" for her interest in connections between geology of the Pacific Northwest and the people in its local communities. She is a published expert on the 2014 Oso landslide.

== Background ==
Following her 2013 Ph.D. from University of Washington (UW), she was awarded an NSF Earth Sciences Postdoctoral Fellowship. For some time while she was a student at UW, she was a graduate student with the Pacific Northwest Seismic Network.

While appearing on a podcast, Allstadt said that she had been interested in the earth sciences from a young age, though she started her undergrad as an architecture major. She later switched it to environmental geology.

== Research ==
Allstadt is credited by the Exotic Seismic Events Catalog, which is managed by the National Science Foundation and EarthScope, as she is an author on the data releases constituting the system's information base. She also frequently collaborates with David J. Wald, a fellow seismologist on publishing about earthquake analysis systems such as PAGER and ShakeMap.

Allstadt published an article in Crosscut and later Next City in 2012 about the seismic risks in Seattle. A report authored by her about landslide risks for the city also gathered media attention in 2013 and 2014. The report was published in the Bulletin of the Seismological Society of America, and described, in summary, that a "shallow crustal earthquake close to the city would be most damaging."

Another publication by Allstadt that received secondary attention was a 2014 study on snow causing earthquakes at Mount Rainier. In a 2023 presentation, she is also noted as mentioning that the USGS had compiled a list of over two thousand landslides caused by the Turkey–Syria earthquake.

Allstadt has also been referenced by the news media as an expert on landslides and other geophysics topics.

As a researcher, she has spoken at multiple institutions, including Colorado State University in 2017, Lehigh University in 2018, Western Washington University in 2021, University of California, San Diego in 2022, and University of Oregon in 2023. She has also presented at multiple society meetings, such as the 2021 EGU General Assembly and the 2023 SSA Annual Meeting.

== GeoGirls ==
Allstadt is the head coordinator and project leader of GeoGirls, a camp program intended to immerse and engage female students with women scientists and researchers with hand-on interaction at Mount St. Helens. She developed the program with an intent to inspire a future generation of women researchers. The program was supported by equipment provisions from IRIS PASSCAL.
