= Andrew Gardner =

Andrew or Andy Gardner may refer to:

- Andrew Gardner (archaeologist), British archaeologist
- Andrew Gardner (newsreader) (1932–1999), British television newsreader
- Andrew Gardner (American football) (born 1986), American football player
- Andrew M. Gardner (born 1969), American anthropologist
- Andy Gardner (footballer, born 1877) (1877–?), Scottish football forward active in the 1900s
- Andy Gardner (footballer, born 1888) (1888–1934), Scottish football centre half active in the 1910s
- Andrew Gardner (runner) (born 1995), American steeplechase runner, 2018 All-American for the Washington Huskies track and field team

== See also ==
- Andrew Gardiner Kane, unionist politician
- Gardner (surname)
