= 2017 Taxkorgan earthquake =

5.4 Mw earthquake in Xinjiang, China

- Location within Xinjiang Location within Tajikistan
- UTC time: 2017-05-10 21:58:21
- ISC event: 610623477
- USGS-ANSS: ComCat
- Local date: 11 May 2017
- Local time: 05:58:04 CST (UTC+8)
- Magnitude: 5.4 M_{w}
- Depth: 7.6 km (5 mi)
- Epicenter: 37.643°N 75.310°E
- Areas affected: Kashgar Prefecture, Xinjiang, China
- Max. intensity: MMI VII (Very strong)
- Casualties: 8 fatalities, 25 injuries

On 11 May 2017, at 05:58 CST (21:58 UTC on 10 May), a M_{w} 5.4 earthquake occurred in Tashkurgan, in Xinjiang, China, near the border with Tajikistan, killing 8 people.

== Earthquake ==
The earthquake occurred as a result of movement on a normal fault. The epicenter was located in a mountainous area. According to the USGS' PAGER service, the earthquake had a maximum Modified Mercalli intensity of VII (Very strong), and that 2,000 people were exposed to damaging shaking intensities above VI (Strong).

== Impact ==
Eight people were killed and 25 others were injured, including one seriously. More than 4,750 houses were also destroyed.
