= Gardiner =

Gardiner may refer to:

== Places ==
=== Settlements ===
Canada

- Gardiner, Ontario

United States

- Gardiner, Maine
- Gardiner, Montana
- Gardiner (town), New York
  - Gardiner (CDP), New York
- Gardiner, Oregon
- Gardiner, Washington
- West Gardiner, Maine

=== Buildings and landmarks ===
- Gardiner Museum, a ceramics museum in Toronto
- Gardiner railway station, in Melbourne

=== Geographical features ===
Antarctica

- Gardiner Ridge, Ames Range, Marie Byrd Land

Australia

- Gardiner railway station, Melbourne, Victoria

Canada

- Gardiner Dam in Saskatchewan
- Gardiner Expressway in Toronto
- Gardiner Island (Nunavut), uninhabited arctic island in Nunavut

United States

- Gardiners Bay in New York State
- Gardiners Island in Gardiners Bay
- Gardiner River (also known as the Gardner River) in Yellowstone National Park, United States

== People ==
- Lord Gardiner (disambiguation)
- Baron Gardiner

=== Stagenames ===
- Gardiner Sisters

=== People with Gardiner as a surname ===
See Gardiner (surname)

=== People with Gardiner as a first name ===
- Gardiner Greene (1753–1832), American cotton planter and merchant
- Gardiner Greene Hubbard (1822–1897), first president of the National Geographic Society

== Ships ==
- HMS Gardiner, a British frigate in commission in the Royal Navy from 1943 to 1945

== Linguistics ==
- Gardiner's sign list, a standard method for categorizing ancient Egyptian hieroglyphics

== See also ==
- Gardener (disambiguation)
- Gardner (disambiguation)
- Justice Gardiner (disambiguation)
