= City of Strangers =

City of Strangers may refer to:

- City of Strangers: Gulf Migration and the Indian Community in Bahrain
- City of Strangers, album by Ute Lemper 1994
- City of Strangers (film), alternative title of Japanese film
