= Daniel Gardner (disambiguation) =

Daniel, Dan or Danny Gardner may refer to:

- Daniel Gardner (1750–1805) British painter
- Dan Gardner (politician), (born 1958), American politician
- Dan Gardner (author) (born 1968), Canadian author
- Daniel Gardner (musician), (born 1980), Canadian musician
- Dan Gardner (footballer) (born 1990), English footballer
- Dan Gardner (cyclist) (born 1996), British cyclist
