= Thomas Gardiner =

Thomas Gardiner may refer to:

- Thomas Gardiner (publisher) (1826–1899), American newspaper publisher
- Sir Thomas Gardiner (Royalist) (1591–1652), English lawyer and politician, member of parliament (MP) for Callington
- Thomas Gardiner (monk), monk of Westminster
- Thomas Gardiner (MP for Mitchell) (c. 1526 – 1585 or c. 1591), MP for Mitchell
- Sir Thomas Gardiner (civil servant) (1883–1964), British civil servant
- Tom Gardiner (born 1962), American soccer player
- Thomas A. Gardiner (1832–1881), American politician from New York

== See also ==
- Thomas Gardiner Corcoran (1900–1981), U.S. New Deal official
- Thomas Gardner (disambiguation)
- Thomas Gardener (died 1409), MP
