= Donald Gardner =

Donald Gardner may refer to:

- Donald R. Gardner, U.S. Marine Corps officer and former president of the Marine Corps University
- Donald Yetter Gardner (1913–2004), wrote the Christmas song "All I Want For Christmas Is My Two Front Teeth"
- Donald Stanley Gardner, American electrical engineer
- Don Gardner (1931–2018), American rhythm and blues singer, songwriter, and drummer
- Don Gardner (American football) (born 1997)
