= Advanced National Seismic System =

System to collect and analyze data on significant earthquakes

Logo of the ANSS

The Advanced National Seismic System (ANSS) is a collaboration of the United States Geological Survey (USGS) and regional, state, and academic partners that collects and analyzes data on significant earthquakes to provide near real-time (generally within 10 to 30 minutes) information to emergency responders and officials, the news media, and the public. Such information is used to anticipate the likely severity and extent of damage, and to guide decisions on the responses needed.

Data is collected by eleven regional seismic networks and the National Seismic Network ("ANSS backbone") of dedicated stations, with additional inputs from overseas seismic networks. Analysis is done at the regional data centers, and at the USGS National Earthquake Information Center (NEIC), with the results posted at the USGS earthquake web page.

The National Strong Motion Project of the ANSS has instrumented 168 structures to record their response to very strong shaking. This data is used in research on earthquake-resistant engineering.

== Products and services ==
The ANSS provides a range of products and services:

- Earthquake detections, location, depths, magnitudes, and origin times.
- Earthquake source information, including focal mechanisms, moment tensors, and finite fault models.
- ShakeAlert: Earthquake early warning messages in California, Oregon, and Washington.
- Immediate notification of earthquakes to government and emergency managers.
- Earthquake Notification Service (ENS): customized notifications via e-mail and text messages.
- ShakeMap: a map of the anticipated severity and extent of ground shaking, based on the measured strength of ground shaking, and known characteristics of the affected locality.
- ShakeCast: automated delivery of ShakeMaps customized for critical infrastructure, providing an estimate of shaking experienced.
- Prompt Assessment of Global Earthquakes for Response (PAGER): combines ShakeMap results with an inventory of buildings and construction types to provide an immediate estimate of
- Did-You-Feel-It? (DYFI): crowd-sourced reports of shaking that augment and interpolate instrumental data.
- Ground Failure: estimations of the impacts of landslides and liquefaction caused by earthquake shaking.
- The ANSS Comprehensive Catalog (ComCat) is a repository of data from the participating seismic networks. For significant earthquakes the NEIC prepares a summary of the tectonic setting, nearby fault systems, and historical seismicity.

These can be accessed at the USGS Earthquake page: https://earthquake.usgs.gov/earthquakes/.

== Participating regional networks ==
As of 2023 the following networks were participating in the ANSS:

- Alaska Earthquake Center of the Geophysical Institute, University of Alaska Fairbanks.
- California Integrated Seismic Network (CISN), the principal units of which are networks and data centers operated by the California Institute of Technology (Caltech), the University of California (UC) Berkeley, and the USGS Earthquake Science Center at Menlo Park, which are all participants in ANSS, as well as the California Geological Survey.
- Center for Earthquake Research and Information, University of Memphis.
- Montana Bureau of Mines and Geology.
- Nevada Seismological Laboratory, University of Nevada, Reno.
- Oklahoma Geological Survey, University of Oklahoma.
- Pacific Northwest Seismic Network, operated by the University of Washington and University of Oregon.
- Puerto Rico Seismic Network, University of Puerto Rico, Mayaguez.
- South Carolina Seismic Network, University of South Carolina.
- Texas Seismological Network, University of Texas.
- University of Utah Seismograph Stations.
- USGS Hawaiian Volcano Observatory.
- USGS National Earthquake Information Center.

Additional stations are operated by the USGS Albuquerque Seismological Laboratory (ASL).

The regional networks are deemed authoritative for the location and magnitude of earthquakes in their region. The NEIC receives additional data from about 3,000 stations around the world, and provides backup if a regional network is unable to communicate.

== See also ==
- International Seismological Centre
- Incorporated Research Institutions for Seismology

== Sources ==
- Leith, William (February 3, 2006), "Earthquake Monitoring and Reporting through the Advanced National Seismic System" (PDF), Briefing for the Natural Hazards Caucus, February 3, 2006, archived from the original (PDF) on July 20, 2022
- Statement on Earthquake and Tsunami Monitoring, Seismological Society of America, December 2017
- Sipkin, Stuart A.; Filson, John R.; Benz, Harley M.; Wald, David J.; Earle, Paul S. (5 September 2006), "Advanced National Seismic System Delivers Improved Information", EOS Transactions, 87 (36), doi:10.1029/2006EO360003
- Advanced National Seismic System – Current Status, Development Opportunities, and Priorities for 2017–2027 (PDF), Circular 1429, United States Geological Survey, July 2017, doi:10.3133/cir1429, ISBN 978-1-4113-4136-4, ISSN 2330-5703
- Wald, David J.; Worden, C. Bruce; Quitoriano, Vincent; Goltz, James (2002), "ShakeMap: Its Role in Pre-Earthquake Planning and Post-Earthquake Response and Information", SMIP02 Seminar Proceedings
