= Gardener (surname) =

Gardener is a surname. Notable people with the surname include:

- Daryl Gardener (born 1973), US football player
- Helen H. Gardener (1853–1925), US writer and activist
- Jason Gardener (born 1975), English sprinter
- John Gardener (disambiguation)
- Mark Gardener (born 1969), English musician
- Martha Gardener, Australian broadcaster
- Nico Gardener (1908–1989), British bridge player
- Nicola Gardener (born 1949), British bridge player
- Thomas Gardener (died 1408/9), English politician
- Walson Gardener (born 1932), US NASCAR driver

== See also ==
- Gardner (surname)
- Gardiner (surname)
- Gartner (surname)
