= General Gardiner =

General Gardiner may refer to:

- Lou Gardiner (1952–2015), New Zealand Army major general
- Lynedoch Gardiner (1820–1897), British Army general
- Robert Gardiner (British Army officer) (1781–1864), British Army general
- William Gardiner (British Army officer) (1748–1806), British Army lieutenant general

== See also ==
- General Gardner (disambiguation)
