= Gaertner =

Gaertner or Gärtner is a German surname meaning "gardener". Notable people with the surname include:

- Belva Gaertner (1885–1965), American cabaret singer and alleged murderer
- Bertil Gärtner (1924–2009), Swedish Lutheran bishop of Gothenburg
- Carl Gaertner (1898–1952), American artist
- Claus Theo Gärtner (born 1943), German television actor
- Christian Gärtner (1705–1782), German merchant and astronomer
- Friedrich Gärtner (1824–1905), German architectural painter
- Friedrich von Gärtner (1791–1847), German architect
- Georg Gärtner (1920–2013), German soldier and prisoner of war who escaped after the end of World War II and lived under an alias in the US
- Gottfried Gaertner (1754–1825), German botanist
- Gustav Gärtner (1855–1937), Austrian pathologist
- Hildesuse Gärtner (1923–2016), German alpine skier
- Joseph Gaertner (1732–1791), German botanist
- Jürgen Gärtner (born 1950), German mathematician
- Karl Friedrich von Gaertner (1772–1850), German botanist
- Paul Gaertner (born 1953), birth name of Paul Gertner, American magician

== See also ==
- Gardner (surname)
- Gardiner (surname)
- Gartner (surname)
- Gartner, a technological research and consulting firm
