= Baghban (disambiguation) =

The Baghban are a Muslim community found in North India and in Pakistan.

Baghban may also refer to:

- Baghban (1938 film), a Hindi/Urdu family drama
- Baghban (2003 film), an Indian Hindi drama film

== See also ==
- The Gardener (disambiguation)
