= Thomas Gardner =

Thomas Gardner may refer to:

- Thomas Gardner (antiquary) (1690–1769), English antiquary
- Thomas Gardner (politician) (1724–1775), American political figure and soldier
- Thomas Gardner (planter) (1592–1674), American colonist
- Thomas Gardner (basketball) (born 1985), American basketball player
- Tommy Gardner (1910–1970), English footballer
- Thomas Gardner (footballer, born 1923) (1923–2016), English footballer
- Thomas Gardner (soccer) (born 1998), Canadian soccer player
- Tom Gardner (born 1968), American businessman, co-founder of The Motley Fool

== See also ==
- Thomas Gardiner (disambiguation)
- Thomas Garner (disambiguation)
- Thomas Gardener (died 1409), politician
