= Cynthia Gardner =

American geologist and volcanologist

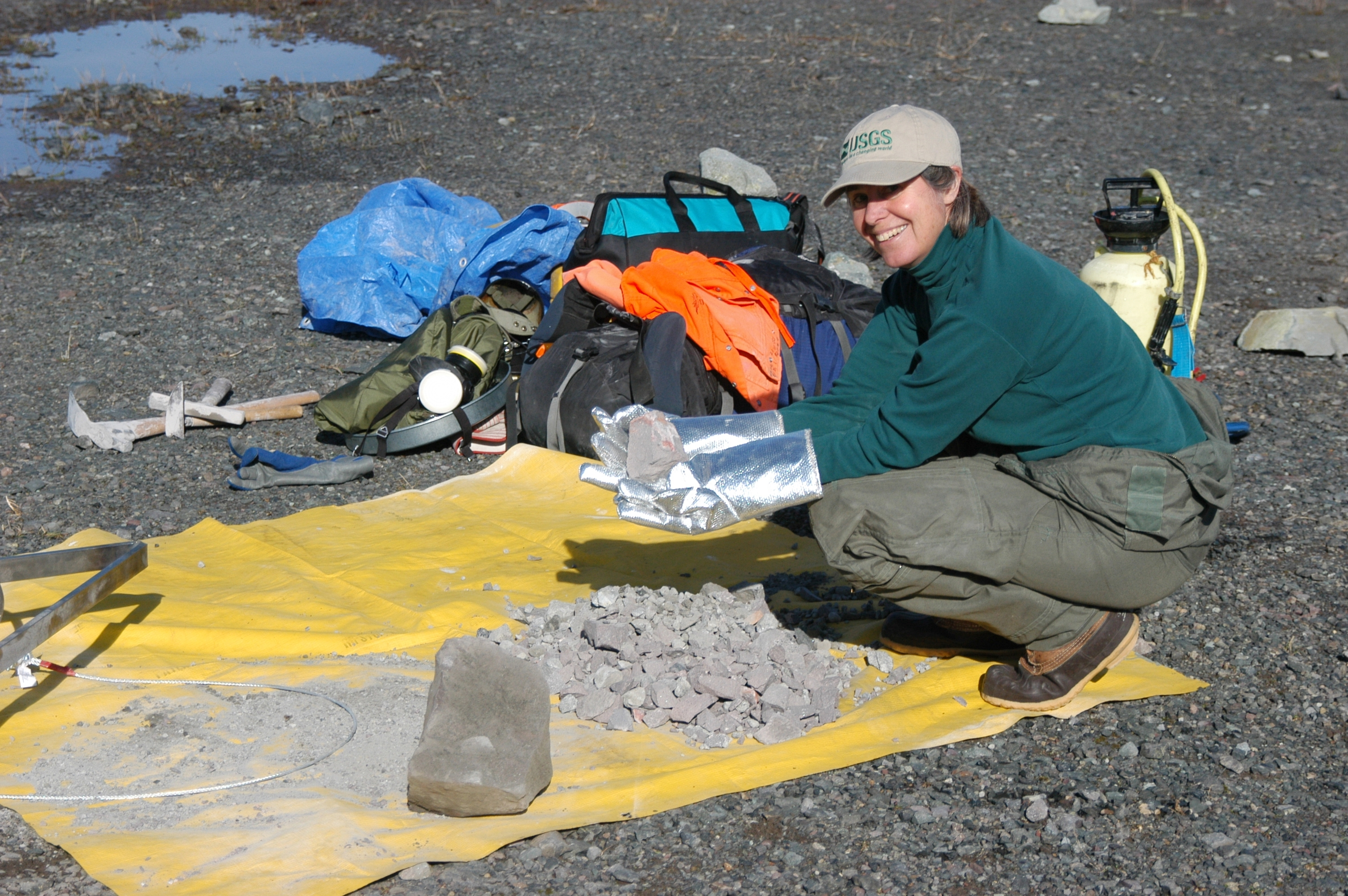
Gardner at Mount St. Helens in 2004

Cynthia A. Gardner is an American geologist and volcanologist who is best recognized for her work on Mount St. Helens. Including her research on the volcanoes in the Cascade Range, she was the acting Scientist-in-Charge (SIC) of the Cascades Volcano Observatory during the 2004 volcanic reawakening at Mount St. Helens. She officially served as SIC from 2005 to 2010—making her the first female to fill the role. She has continued to be regarded as an influential expert on volcanology in the Cascade Range.

== Background ==
Raised in Shelburne, Vermont, she later went on to pursue a degree at the University of Vermont where she graduated in 1977. In the early stages of her career, her research differentiated her from her peers because she thoroughly analyzed the systems and processes that occur during a volcanic eruption. Particularly, she studied eruption deposits post-explosion, lava-dome growth and volcanic gases during eruption. Gardner's studies massed the regions of the Pacific Northwest and Alaska.

Gardner joined the U.S. Geological Survey (USGS) in 1980, and worked out of their office in Denver, Colorado. She was transferred to the USGS Cascades Volcano Observatory located in Vancouver, Washington in 1987, and is currently a USGS emeritus scientist. After the Mount St. Helens' eruption in 1980, Gardner helped develop a government research program at the Cascades Volcano Observatory. Her research consisted of providing information about volcanic rumbles, the swelling of mountains and off-gassing.

== Research on Mount St. Helens ==
For the majority of her career, her research alongside her colleagues consisted of studying different aspects of volcanic activity such as deformation, rising rate of magma and the crystallization process in volcanic areas. During the 1980's eruption cycle, Gardner and her team spent time monitoring volcanic emissions such as sulfur dioxide. This research was valuable because it highlighted periods of unrest in areas of high-tectonic activity such as the Cascade Range. Further research was conducted on the depositional processes post-eruption, such as pyroclastic flows and debris, which are some of the deadliest hazards after a volcanic eruption. This information was crucial to creating emergency responses to volcanic activity.

== Volunteer work ==
Along with Kate Allstadt, Gardner was an active mentor in the GeoGirls program, which helps young girls connect with geology by introducing them to experienced women geologists who lead them on educational activities. As a leading researcher on Mount St. Helens, she provided valuable insight and education to the participants of the program.
