= Thomas Garner (disambiguation) =

Thomas Garner was a leading English Gothic revival architect.

Thomas Garner may also refer to:

- Thomas Garner (engraver) (1789–1868), English engraver

== See also ==
- Tom Garner (born 1961), American golfer
- Thomas Gardner (disambiguation)
