= Psychic bid =

Bid in contract bridge

A psychic bid (also psych, pronounced to rhyme with like) is a bid in contract bridge that grossly misstates the power and/or suit lengths of one's hand. It is used deliberately to deceive the opponents. Normally, the psychic bid is made with a weak hand, overstating its overall strength, the length and strength in a particular suit, or both. (The noun is occasionally misspelled as psyche, through confusion with Psyche, a character in a myth concerning Venus and Cupid.)

== Origins ==
As an early frequent user of the technique, Dorothy Rice Sims is often thought to be the originator of the psychic bid; however, according to bridge player and writer, Albert Morehead, "She did not actually invent the psychic bid, though it is generally credited to her, but she did give it its name and she wrote the first and only book about it." (Note: Harold S. Vanderbilt refers to "bluff bidding", one type of psychic bidding, in his 1929 book Contract Bridge.) She is regarded as having coined the term "psychic".

== Examples ==
♠ Q6432 ♥ 73 ♦ 1053 ♣ J83

After two successive passes, this hand might be opened with 1♠ as a psych, trying to stop opponents from reaching a likely game or even slam. Some might open with a 1♥ psych, to confuse matters further. Of course, there is always a danger that the partner will double the opponents on the basis of opener's presumed strength, or support the psychic opening at too high a level.

♠ AQ3 ♥ AJ9 ♦ 53 ♣ QJ852

North opens 1♣ and South can see that game in notrump is probably the best prospect. South might support clubs directly, bid 2NT, or temporize with 1♥ or 1♠. But South might instead bid 1♦, a psych that attempts to talk the opponents out of a diamond lead against 3NT.

♠ 53 ♥ J42 ♦ KQJ1083 ♣ 106

Right-hand opponent opens 1♠. Instead of preempting in diamonds, South can bid 1NT to confuse matters, running to diamonds if doubled. This type of psych is referred to as the comic notrump.

Some psychic bids are so common that they are often referred to as mini-psychs. For example, many would consider a hand such as ♠ 53 ♥ Q642 ♦ QJ85 ♣ 1084 to be an automatic 1♠ bid after partner opens 1♥ and the right-hand opponent doubles for takeout—it is made in an attempt to talk the opponents out of their likely spade fit, subsequently escaping to 3♥ if necessary.

== Regulations ==
Per rules of the game, the partner of a player who has psyched must not take advantage of any special knowledge of the partnership's habits. So a partnership that uses occasional psychic bids must take care to ensure full disclosure – not only of its formal bidding system but also of its habits. For example, if a partnership tends to psych under certain circumstances, it is much better prepared to recognize a psych, and to cope with it, than are its opponents. The game's Laws and Proprieties therefore require disclosure of the partnership's tendency.

In duplicate bridge, sponsoring organizations often impose a number of restrictions on psychic bids. For example, psychs of strong artificial opening bids (such as strong two clubs) are not allowed by the American Contract Bridge League (ACBL). In addition, if the partner is perceived to have bid abnormally due to taking account of a psych, then the score may be adjusted. Also, partnership agreements to use a "check bid" or psychic control to verify the psych may either be banned entirely (as by the ACBL) or limited in their usage (as by the World Bridge Federation, which designates them brown sticker conventions).

== See also ==
- Bluff (poker)
