= John Gartner =

John Gartner may refer to:

- John Gartner (philatelist), Australian philatelist
- John Gartner (psychologist), American psychologist
