= Gardinier =

Gardinier is a surname. Notable people with the surname include:

- Cornelius Gardinier (1809–1892), American politician
- Estella Gardinier, a contestant in the American TV series The Bachelor
- Suzanne Gardinier (born 1961), American poet

== See also ==
- Gardiner (surname)
- Gardner (surname)
