= Judge Gardner =

Judge Gardner may refer to:

- Archibald K. Gardner (1867–1962), judge of the United States Court of Appeals for the Eighth Circuit
- Bunk Gardner (judge) (1875–1960), judge of the United States District Court for the Canal Zone
- James Knoll Gardner (1940–2017), judge of the United States District Court for the Eastern District of Pennsylvania
- Kathryn Gardner (born 1956), judge of the Kansas Court of Appeals
- Leslie Abrams Gardner (born 1974), judge of the United States District Court for the Middle District of Georgia
- Walter P. Gardner (died 1949), judge of the New Jersey Court of Errors and Appeals
- Wendell P. Gardner (1946–2026), judge of the Superior Court of the District of Columbia

== See also ==
- Justice Gardner (disambiguation)
