= Senator Gardiner =

Senator Gardiner may refer to:

- Andy Gardiner (born 1969), Florida State Senate
- David Gardiner (politician) (1784–1844), New York State Senate
- Thomas A. Gardiner (1832–1881), New York State Senate

== See also ==
- Senator Gardner (disambiguation)
