= Joseph Gardner =

Joseph or Joe Gardner may refer to:

- Joe Gardner (musician), jazz trumpeter
- Joseph Gardner (physician) (1752–1794), American physician, delegate for Pennsylvania to the Continental Congress
- Joe C. Gardner (1944–2013), American politician
- Joseph Gardner (murderer) (1970–2008), American convicted murderer and fugitive
- Joe Gardner (footballer), English footballer
- Joe Gardner, a fictional character from Pixar's Soul
- Joe Gardner, a fictional character from DC Comics, and one of the users of the codename Enforcer.

== See also ==
- Joseph Gardner House, historic house in Swansea, Massachusetts
- Joseph Gardner Swift (1783–1865), American soldier
- Joseph G. Wilson (Joseph Gardner Wilson, 1826–1873), American Republican politician
