= The Gardener =

The Gardener may refer to:

- The Gardener (1912 film), a Swedish silent film
- The Gardener (1974 film), an American horror film
- The Gardener (1987 film), a Soviet drama film
- The Gardener (2012 film), an Iranian documentary film
- The Gardener, a 2021 action film starring Gary Daniels
- The Gardener (2025 film), a French action comedy film
- The Gardener (TV series), a Spanish romantic thriller television series
- The Gardener (ballad), a Child ballad
- The Gardener (Arcimboldo), a c. 1587–1590 painting by Giuseppe Arcimboldo
- The Gardener (Van Gogh), an 1889 painting by Vincent van Gogh
- The Gardener (children's book), an American children's picture book by Sarah Stewart
- "The Gardener" (story), a 1925 short story by Rudyard Kipling
- The Gardener, a collection of poems by Rabindranath Tagore
- The Gardener, a Mexican drug lord

== See also ==
- Baghban (disambiguation)
- Gardener (disambiguation)
- Gardening
