= Lord Gardiner =

Lord Gardiner may refer to:

- Gerald Gardiner, Baron Gardiner (1900–1990), British Labour politician
- John Gardiner, Baron Gardiner of Kimble (born 1956), British Conservative politician
