= Marianna Gartner =

Canadian painter (born 1963)

- Born: Winnipeg, Manitoba
- Known for: Painter
- Website: Official website

Marianna Gartner (born 1963) is a Canadian painter. Gartner was born in Winnipeg, Manitoba, but moved to Calgary, Alberta during her early childhood. She has also lived and worked in Budapest and Berlin. Gartner has exhibited and been collected mainly in Berlin, Paris, New York, Vienna, Budapest and Zurich. She currently lives and works in Victoria, British Columbia, Canada.

== Commentary on her work ==
Her paintings, often inspired by subjects in old photographs but manipulated to "create scenes which can challenge a contemporary viewer", have been variously described as "disquiet" and having a "haunting quality".

Deirdre Hanna wrote the following about Gartner: "Award-winning essayist, Alberto Manguel, put Calgary-based Winnipeg native Marianna Gartner in the international limelight when he chose her as the only Canadian artist to profile in Reading Pictures, a 2002 book that also looks at paintings by historical giants including Pablo Picasso and Caravaggio. For her first solo show since that book's publication, Sable-Castelli's Stepping Out, Gartner pulls back from the tattooed babies and circus freaks that first caught Manguel's attention." "Instead, she focuses on what is both disturbed and disturbing in more banal (at first glance, anyway) imagery -- like the 19th-century, tweed-and-mutton-chop-whisker-sporting gunman in I'd Rather Be Hunting, or the surreal little girl in a lacy pinafore of St. Margaret And The Dragon." "Gartner's fascination with Victorian curios is very much in evidence in these near-monochromatic canvases, and as her references get more subtle, the parallels with John Tenniel's illustrations for Alice In Wonderland become more apparent."
