= Justice Gardner =

Justice Gardner may refer to:

- Ezekiel Gardner Jr. (1738–1815), associate justice of the Rhode Island Supreme Court
- John Gardner (Rhode Island governor) (1697–1764), chief justice of the Superior Court of the Colony of Rhode Island and Providence Plantations
- John P. Gardner (1922–1994), special associate justice of the South Carolina Supreme Court
- Lucien D. Gardner (1876–1952), chief justice of the Alabama Supreme Court
- William Gardner (Massachusetts judge) (1827–1888), associate justice of the Massachusetts Supreme Judicial Court

== See also ==
- Justice Gardiner (disambiguation)
- Judge Gardner (disambiguation)
