= Andrew M. Gardner =

American anthropologist

Andrew M. Gardner (born July 9, 1969) is an American anthropologist and Professor of Anthropology at the University of Puget Sound. His research focuses on migration, labor, and urbanization in the Arabian Peninsula, particularly the Gulf States. He is the author of The Fragmentary City: Migration, Modernity, Difference in the Urban Landscape of Doha, Qatar, City of Strangers and has edited collections on migration, labor, and applied anthropology.

== Early life and education ==
Gardner was born to Gordon and Janice Gardner. He received a BA from George Washington University in 1991 and an MA from the University of Arizona in 2000. His M.A. thesis, titled "Good Old Boys in Crisis: Truck Drivers and Shifting Occupational Identity in the Louisiana Oilpatch," focused on the changing structure of the trucking sector that serves the American oil industry in Louisiana. He received a PhD from the University of Arizona in 2005, where his doctoral research examined the experiences of Indian migrants in Bahrain.

During his graduate studies at the University of Arizona, he worked with the Bureau of Applied Research in Anthropology (BARA), a research center within the School of Anthropology focused on applied and community-based anthropological research.

== Career ==
His academic career began with doctoral research at the University of Arizona, where he studied the contemporary livelihoods of Bedouin pastoral nomads in Saudi Arabia. During this period, he observed how these pastoral economies had become intertwined with migrant labor from Asia, Africa, and the Middle East, a realization that shifted the direction of his future scholarship toward migration and labor in the Gulf.

In 2002–2003, Gardner conducted a year of ethnographic fieldwork in Bahrain, focusing on the Indian diaspora and the structures of labor migration that shape their lives. This research became the basis of his dissertation and later his book City of Strangers: Gulf Migration and the Indian Community in Bahrain (2010). In 2008, he joined Qatar University as a visiting faculty member while on leave from Puget Sound, where he examine the urban development of Gulf cities and the political ecologies of their rapid growth.

He has served as program chair and has chaired or participated in committees of the American Anthropological Association, including the Margaret Mead Award Committee and the Sol Tax Distinguished Service Award Committee.

He has served as program chair for the 2025 meeting of the Society for Applied Anthropology.

== Research ==
While his research continued to explore these issues in both Bahrain and Qatar, between 2010 and 2013 he formed and led a research team that conducted the first large-scale survey of transnational migrant workers in Qatar.

Gardner’s research focuses on migration, urbanization, and political ecology in the Arabian Peninsula. His early work examined the lived experiences of South Asian and other migrant workers in the Gulf States, particularly within the context of the kafala sponsorship system.

His most recent book, The Fragmentary City: Migration, Modernity, and Difference in the Urban Landscape of Doha, Qatar (Cornell 2024), examines how decades of migration and rapid urban development have transformed the city of Doha.

== Selected publications ==
=== Books ===
- Gardner, Andrew M. (2024-05-15). The Fragmentary City. Cornell University Press. ISBN 978-1-5017-7498-0.
- Gardner, Andrew; Hoffman, David M. Dispatches from the Field: Neophyte Ethnographers in a Changing World.
- Gardner, Andrew. Constructing Qatar: Migrant Narratives From the Margins of the Global System. Faculty Scholarship. University of Puget Sound. The University of Puget Sound.
- Gardner, Andrew M. (2017). City of Strangers: Gulf Migration and the Indian Community in Bahrain. Ithaca, NY: Cornell University Press. ISBN 978-0-8014-6220-7.

=== Journal articles ===
- Gardner, Andrew; Jamal, Areej (2025), "Rethinking the Family: Transnational Mobilities and Conceptual Imperialism in a Globalizing World", Gulf Studies, Singapore: Springer Nature Singapore, pp. 661–679, ISBN 978-981-96-3411-8
- Gardner, Andrew (2025-07-08), "The shifting gravity of the urban", Handbook of Research on Migration, COVID-19 and Cities, Edward Elgar Publishing, pp. 73–87, ISBN 978-1-0353-0123-2
- Gardner, Andrew; Giri, Deeipendra (2023-09-02). "The Donkey Trail: A Difficult New Migrant Pathway to the U.S. Border". Anthropology Now. 15 (2–3): 120–129. doi:10.1080/19428200.2023.2321067. ISSN 1942-8200.
- Gardern, Andrew M.; Murphy, Becca (2023). "Big Parcels: Modernist Planning in Washington State History" (PDF). Journal of Northwest Anthropology. 57 (1): 99–113.
- Gardner, Andrew (2021-07-03). "Cosmopolitanism and Urban Space in Doha, Qatar". Journal of Arabian Studies. 11 (2): 210–222. doi:10.1080/21534764.2021.2082799. ISSN 2153-4764.
- Gardner, Andrew (2020-09-01). "A Window to Urban Arabia". Anthropology Now. 12 (3): 64–73. doi:10.1080/19428200.2020.1884477. ISSN 1942-8200.
- Gardner, Andrew; Pessoa, Silvia; Diop, Abdoulaye; Al-Ghanim, Kaltham; Le Trung, Kien; Harkness, Laura (2019-11-28), "A Portrait of Low-Income Migrants in Contemporary Qatar", Asianization of Migrant Workers in the Gulf Countries, Singapore: Springer Nature Singapore, pp. 83–102, ISBN 978-981-329-286-4
- Gardner, Andrew (2020-02-04). "On Teaching Ethnography in Troubled Times". Teaching Anthropology. 9 (1): 86. doi:10.22582/ta.v8i2.491. ISSN 2053-9843.
- Gardner, Andrew (2018-01-02). "Reflections on the Role of Law in the Gulf Migration System". The Journal of Legal Studies. 47 (S1): S129–S147. doi:10.1086/693436. ISSN 0047-2530.
