= Gardener 1NT =

Contract bridge convention

In contract bridge, the Gardener one notrump overcall (also known as comic notrump) is an overcall of 1NT denoting either a 16-18 balanced hand (as natural), or a weak hand with a long suit (6 card).

It is named after British player Nico Gardener. The partner, if interested in game, checks the "seriousness" of the overcall by bidding 2♣, and the overcaller responds 2NT with real notrump overcall, and corrects to a suit (or passes with clubs) if weak. It dates back to the times when jump overcalls denoted intermediate or strong hands with a single suit. The convention presents a psychic bid with control, thus it can be subject to restrictions for use on certain levels of competition.
