= ShakeMap =

U.S. Geological Survey earthquake mapping and tracking system

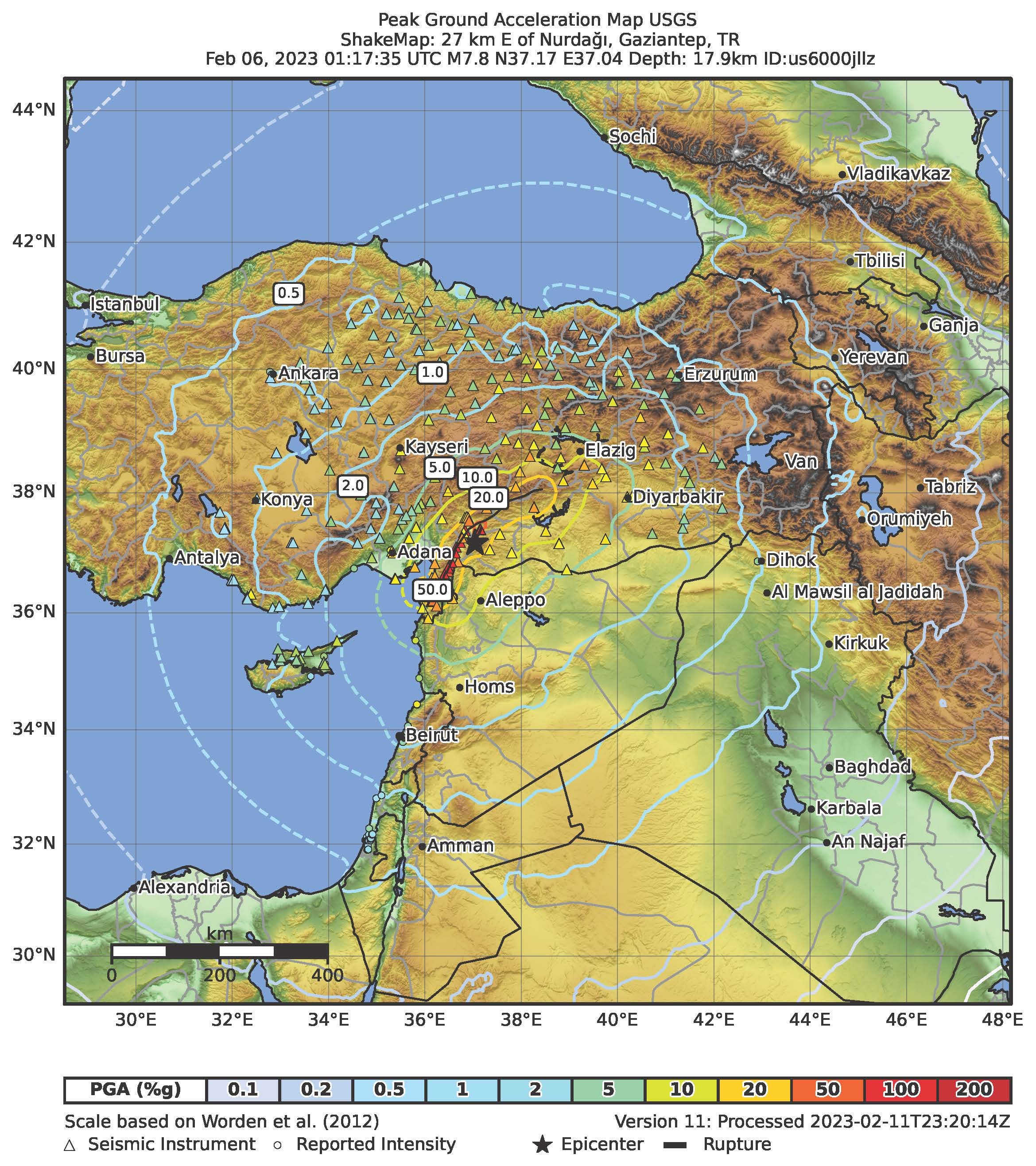
- A ShakeMap showing the peak ground acceleration of the 2023 Turkey earthquake.
- Manufacturer: U.S. Geological Survey Earthquake Hazards Program
- Available: Yes
- Website: earthquake.usgs.gov/data/shakemap

ShakeMap is a product of the U.S. Geological Survey (USGS) to map the shaking of earthquakes. According to the USGS, "ShakeMaps provide near-real-time maps of ground motion and shaking intensity following significant earthquakes. These maps are used by federal, state, and local organizations, both public and private, for post-earthquake response and recovery, public and scientific information, as well as for preparedness exercises and disaster planning." The system's development was led largely by USGS seismologist David J. Wald with others.

ShakeMap's goal is to "go beyond magnitude and epicenter" to depict the variations in the distribution of shaking intensity. Here, "shaking intensity" is used informally, as in "how intense was the shaking?" ShakeMap is now an open-source software program employed to automatically produce a suite of maps and products that portray the geographical extent and severity of potentially damaging shaking following an earthquake. It is routinely used to provide post-earthquake situational awareness for emergency management and response and for damage and loss estimation.

ShakeMap is also the primary shaking hazard input for many other downstream USGS earthquake products, including ShakeCast's assessments of critical facilities, PAGER's societal losses, and estimates of ground failure.
