= Alan Gardner =

Alan Gardner may refer to:

- Alan Gardner, 1st Baron Gardner (1742–1809), British Royal Navy officer and politician
- Alan Gardner, 2nd Baron Gardner (1770–1815), British Royal Navy officer
- Alan Gardner, 3rd Baron Gardner (1810–1883), British Whig politician
- Alan Coulston Gardner, British member of parliament for Ross, 1906–1908
