= General Gardner =

General Gardner may refer to:

- Donald R. Gardner (fl. 1950s–1990s), U.S. Marine Corps major general
- Franklin Gardner (1823–1873), Confederate States Army major general
- Grandison Gardner (1892–1973), U.S. Air Force major general
- John D. Gardner (fl. 2000s), U.S. Army lieutenant general
- William M. Gardner (1824–1901), Confederate States Army brigadier general

== See also ==
- General Gardiner (disambiguation)
