= Andy Gardner (footballer, born 1888) =

Scottish footballer

Personal information
- Full name: Andrew Gardner
- Date of birth: 1888
- Place of birth: Airdrie, Scotland
- Date of death: 2 June 1934 (aged 45–46)
- Height: 5 ft 9 1/2 in (1.77 m)
- Position: Centre half

Senior career*
| Years | Team | Apps | (Gls) |
| – | Petershill | | |
| 1909–1919 | Lincoln City | 151 | (9) |
- * Club domestic league appearances and goals

Andrew Gardner (1888 – 2 June 1934) was a Scottish professional footballer who made 151 appearances in the Football League for Lincoln City either side of the First World War. He played as a centre half. Before moving to England he played for junior club Petershill.
