= Robin Gartner =

Swedish ice hockey player (born 1988)

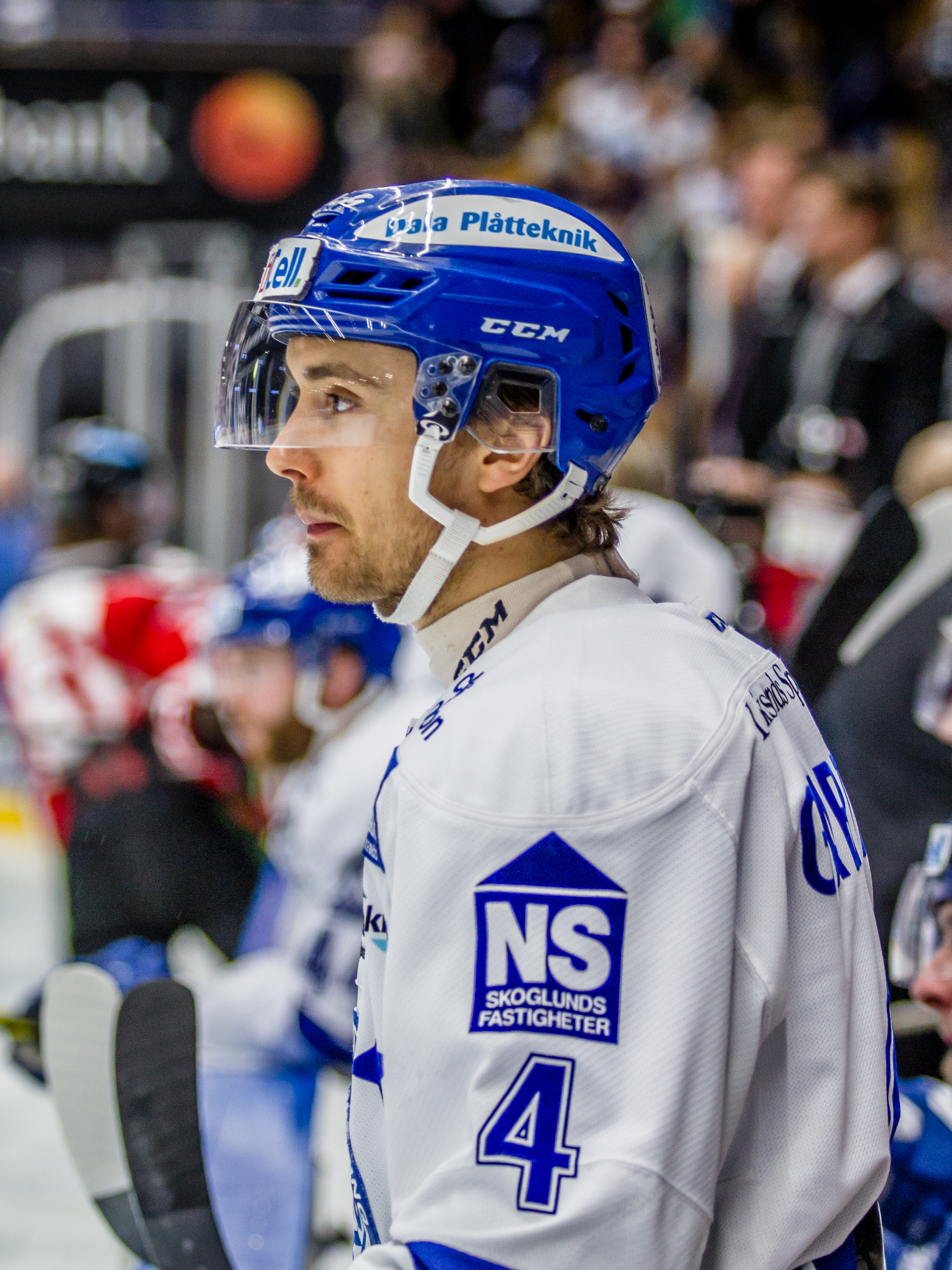
- Born: November 7, 1988 (age 37) Nacka, Sweden
- Height: 5 ft 10 in (178 cm)
- Weight: 172 lb (78 kg; 12 st 4 lb)
- Position: Defence
- Shot: Left
- Played for: HV71; Örebro HK; Leksands IF; Karlskrona HK; HC Bolzano; EC KAC; Dornbirner EC; Kitzbüheler EC
- Playing career: 2006–2021

Robin Gartner (born November 7, 1988) is a Swedish professional ice hockey defenceman. He is currently an unrestricted free agent who most recently played with EC KAC of the Austrian Hockey League (EBEL).

Gartner made his Elitserien debut playing with HV71 during the 2005–06 Elitserien season. After two seasons with Örebro HK, Gartner left as a free agent to sign with his third SHL club, Leksands IF on April 16, 2014.

== Career statistics ==
			Regular season					Playoffs
Season	Team	League	GP	G	A	Pts	PIM	GP	G	A	Pts	PIM
2004–05	HV71 J18	J18 Allsvenskan	4	1	1	2	16	—	—	—	—	—
2004–05	HV71 J20	J20 SuperElit	27	0	3	3	46	—	—	—	—	—
2005–06	HV71 J18	J18 Allsvenskan	5	0	3	3	2	4	1	3	4	4
2005–06	HV71 J20	J20 SuperElit	42	2	14	16	46	—	—	—	—	—
2005–06	HV71	Elitserien	1	0	0	0	0	—	—	—	—	—
2006–07	HV71 J20	J20 SuperElit	39	4	13	17	58	4	0	0	0	6
2006–07	HV71	Elitserien	1	0	0	0	0	—	—	—	—	—
2007–08	IK Oskarshamn	HockeyAllsvenskan	43	4	5	9	42	—	—	—	—	—
2008–09	IK Oskarshamn J20	J20 Div.1	1	0	2	2	14	—	—	—	—	—
2008–09	IK Oskarshamn	HockeyAllsvenskan	36	2	5	7	24	—	—	—	—	—
2009–10	Mora IK	HockeyAllsvenskan	51	2	10	12	44	2	0	0	0	4
2010–11	Mora IK	HockeyAllsvenskan	50	5	21	26	20	3	0	0	0	0
2011–12	Mora IK	HockeyAllsvenskan	49	8	20	28	24	—	—	—	—	—
2012–13	Örebro HK	HockeyAllsvenskan	50	3	11	14	24	16	0	4	4	4
2013–14	Örebro HK	SHL	36	0	5	5	6	—	—	—	—	—
2014–15	Leksands IF	SHL	52	2	12	14	12	—	—	—	—	—
2015–16	Karlskrona HK	SHL	52	2	8	10	10	—	—	—	—	—
2016–17	Karlskrona HK	SHL	49	2	5	7	12	—	—	—	—	—
2017–18	HC Bolzano	EBEL	54	2	24	26	14	18	4	7	11	4
2018–19	EC KAC	EBEL	53	2	25	27	18	9	0	0	0	0
2019–20	Dornbirner EC	EBEL	34	2	6	8	12	—	—	—	—	—
2020–21	Kitzbüheler EC	AlpsHL	34	5	18	23	6	—	—	—	—	—
SHL (Elitserien) totals			191	6	30	36	40	—	—	—	—	—
EBEL totals			141	6	55	61	44	27	4	7	11	4
HockeyAllsvenskan totals			279	24	72	96	178	21	0	4	4	8
