= Sheldon Gardner =

American psychologist

Sheldon Frank Gardner (1934–2005) was an American psychologist who worked in the tradition of Sigmund Freud. With his wife, Gwendolyn Stevens, Gardner wrote several books, several pamphlets and other shorter works, and more than 50 articles in the field of psychology. Titles include The Care and Cultivation of Parents, Separation Anxiety and the Dread of Abandonment in Adult Males, Women of Psychology: Pioneers and Innovators, Women of Psychology: Expansion and Refinement, and Red Vienna and the Golden Age of Psychology, 1918-1938.

Gardner held teaching, research, and administrative positions at several major universities and various institutes. Among highlights, he was the first chair of the Psychology Department at the University of North Carolina at Asheville, the founder and Executive Director of the Hyperkinesis Clinic in Pasadena, California, and the founder and Executive Director of the Psychological Assessment Laboratory in Santa Ana, California; also, he organized and directed the Psychological Services Department at the Long Beach Neuro-Psychiatric Institute. From 1982 he lived in Connecticut, where he was Chief Psychologist at the Child Guidance Clinic of Southeastern Connecticut before opening a private practice in Mystic in 1991.

Gardner wrote and performed the play An Evening with Sigmund Freud and performed in other theatrical and musical events, once being nominated for a Eugene O'Neill award for community theater acting in southeastern Connecticut. He wrote a column for a Cape Girardeau, Missouri newspaper and a monthly column for Professional Selling. Late in life, he wrote several novels.

Gardner was born in Chelsea, Massachusetts, the oldest child of Philip and Goldie (Stepanski) Gardner. As the 1952 "outstanding graduating student" from Everett High School in Boston, he earned a scholarship to Harvard and thus an education his family could not have afforded. After graduating with an A.B., he earned a Ph.D. in clinical psychology at the University of Southern California in 1963, where he studied under J. P. Guilford.

He was a longtime member of Rotary International, including service as Secretary of the Mystic, CT chapter. He served on the board of directors of the Eastern Connecticut Symphony Orchestra, including one term as Second Vice-President. He served one term as President of the Groton-Mystic chapter of AARP. He was a member of the Vestry of St. Mark's Episcopal Church in Mystic, where he also sang in the choir.

Having contracted polio as a child, Gardner overcame the illness, only to have its symptoms recur later in life. He continued to travel widely and to remain, in his words, a "fanatical" tennis player. Gardner was youthful to the last day of his life.

Gwendolyn Stevens has written an account of Gardner's life and ideas, titled Goombah Luigi's Grandson: Memoir of a Jewish Psychologist.
