= Len Gardner =

Australian rules footballer and umpire

Personal information
- Full name: Leonard James Gardner
- Born: 1927
- Died: 3 August 1990 (aged 62–63)

Playing career^{1}
Years	Club	Games (Goals)
1942–1945, 1947–1951	East Perth	113 (46)

Umpiring career
Years	League	Role
1952–?	WANFL	Field umpire
- ^{1} Playing statistics correct to the end of 1951.

Career highlights
- East Perth Premiership player - 1944; WANFL Grand Final umpire - 1956, 1958, 1960, 1961

Leonard James Gardner (1927 – 3 August 1990) was an Australian rules football player and umpire. He played for East Perth in the Western Australian National Football League (WANFL) during the 1940s and 1950s before becoming a WANFL umpire.

== Playing career ==
Gardner made his debut for East Perth in 1942 and played 113 matches in two stints with the club between 1942 and 1951. He was a member of East Perth's 1944 premiership-winning team.

== Umpiring career ==
In 1952 he was nominated as a WANFL umpire and began officiating the same year.

After a match between East Perth and Swan Districts in 1955, he was attacked by an angry mob of East Perth supporters unhappy with their team losing. He was smuggled out of the ground by police.

He took charge of four WANFL grand finals, in 1956, 1958, 1960 and 1961.
