= Randy Gardner =

Randy Gardner may refer to:

- Randy Gardner (born c. 1946), subject of the Randy Gardner sleep deprivation experiment
- Randy Gardner (figure skater) (born 1958), American pair skater
- Randy Gardner (politician) (born 1958), member of the Ohio House of Representatives
