= City of Strangers (book) =

Book by Andrew M. Gardner

City of Strangers: Gulf Migration and the Indian Community in Bahrain
- Author: Andrew M. Gardner
- Published: 2010
- Publisher: Cornell University Press
- Media type: print
- Pages: 216
- ISBN: 978-0801476020

City of Strangers: Gulf Migration and the Indian Community in Bahrain is an English-language book written by Andrew M. Gardner. This book was first published in 2010 by Cornell University Press.

== Synopsis ==
In this book, Gardner has captured the lives and everyday experiences of Indian workers living in Bahrain. These people are mainly migrant workers and constitute about half of the country. Gardener has also told these workers' personal stories and how the "sponsorship system" in this country binds a worker to a particular sponsor.

== Reviews ==
In a book analysis published by the University of Puget Sounds, it was written:

Armed with his interviews and research, Gardner goes beyond merely describing the system and boldly suggests changes that could improve the lot of the workers, without stemming the labor flow that is key to such cities’ wealth. Gardner explains that for the Middle Eastern states, the exploitative practices are a means to build industries and cities that will ensure the region’s international success, even as the oil runs out.
