= Joan Gardner =

Joan Gardner may refer to:

- Joan Gardner (British actress) (1914–1999), British actress
- Joan Gardner (voice actress) (1926–1992), American actress
- Joan Gardner (Broadway actress) (1903–?), Broadway actress and chorus girl
- Joan Gardner (microbiologist) (1918–2013), Australian microbiologist
