= Senator Gardner =

Senator Gardner may refer to:

== Members of the United States Senate ==
- Cory Gardner (born 1974), U.S. Senator from Colorado from 2015 to 2021
- Obadiah Gardner (1852–1938), U.S. Senator from Maine from 1911 to 1913

== United States state senate members ==
- Abraham B. Gardner (1819–1881), Vermont State Senate
- Augustus P. Gardner (1865–1918), Massachusetts State Senate
- Berta Gardner (born 1954), Alaska State Senate
- Bob Gardner (born c. 1954), Colorado State Senate
- Booth Gardner (1936–2013), Washington State Senate
- Elisha T. Gardner (1811–1879), Wisconsin State Senate
- Georgia Gardner (born 1944), Washington State Senate
- James N. Gardner (born 1946), Oregon State Senate
- John J. Gardner (1845–1921), New Jersey State Senate
- Lucien D. Gardner (1876–1952), Alabama State Senate
- Mills Gardner (1830–1910), Ohio State Senate
- Oliver Max Gardner (1882–1947), North Carolina State Senate
- Randy Gardner (politician) (born 1958), Ohio State Senate
- Robert A. Gardner (politician) (born 1945), Ohio State Senate
- Winston Gardner Jr. (born 1938), Florida State Senate

== See also ==
- Senator Gardiner (disambiguation)
