= Martha M. Gardner =

American statistician

- Education: University of Alabama; North Carolina State University
- Occupation: Statistician

Martha M. Gardner is an American statistician associated with GE Global Research, and the former chair of the Quality & Productivity Section of the American Statistical Association.

As an undergraduate at the University of Alabama, Gardner majored in both mathematics and classical languages. She liked classics better than mathematics, but was advised by a classics professor that her job prospects would be much better in mathematics, and that she should look harder for a branch of mathematics that she enjoyed. After earning a master's degree in statistics at Alabama, focused on actuarial science, she moved to North Carolina State University (NCSU) for her doctoral studies. There, she built connections with electrical engineering that she carried over to her work with General Electric, where she has also worked on projects in chemical engineering, aircraft engine design, and quality management.

In 2011, the NCSU College of Physical and Mathematical Sciences gave Gardner their Medal of Achievement. In 2014, the American Statistical Association honored her by electing her as one of their Fellows.
