= Justice Gardiner =

Justice Gardiner may refer to:

- Addison Gardiner (1797–1883), chief judge of the New York Court of Appeals from 1854 to 1855
- Gerald Gardiner, Baron Gardiner (1900–1990), Lord Chancellor of Britain from 1964 to 1970
- Robert Gardiner (Chief Justice) (1540–1620), Lord Chief Justice of Ireland from 1586 to 1604
- Stephen Gardiner (1483–1555), Lord Chancellor of Britain from 1553 to 1555

== See also ==
- Justice Gardner (disambiguation)
