= John Gartner (philatelist) =

Australian philatelist

John Gartner (1914 – 29 January 1998) was an Australian printer and publisher. He was a book and coin collector and a noted philatelist who was added to the Roll of Distinguished Philatelists in 1976. He signed the Roll at the London 1980 International Stamp Exhibition.

Gartner was president of the Royal Philatelic Society of Victoria in 1959, 1973 and 1980.

In 1982 his home, and all of his possessions, including his book, coin and stamp collection, were destroyed in a bush fire. Gartner and his wife, Zelma, only survived the fire by taking refuge in their swimming pool.
