= Gardner (given name) =

Gardner is a male given name derived from the surname Gardner. People with the given name include:

- Gardner Ackley (1915–1998), American economist
- Gardner Dozois (1947–2018), American science fiction author and editor
- Gardner Fox (1911–1986), American comic book writer
- Gardner McKay (1932–2001), American actor
- Gardner Minshew (born 1996), American football player
- Gardner Read (1913–2005), American composer
- Gardner Williams (swimmer), American freestyle swimmer
- Gardner D. Williams, American politician
- Gardner F. Williams, American mining engineer and author
- Gardner R. Withrow (1892–1964), American politician

== See also ==
- Gardner (disambiguation)
