= Len Gardner (footballer, born 1931) =

Australian rules footballer (1931–2025)

Personal information
- Born: 16 February 1931
- Died: 17 May 2025 (aged 94)
- Original team: Burnley Scouts
- Height: 180 cm (5 ft 11 in)
- Weight: 81 kg (179 lb)

Playing career
Years	Club	Games (Goals)
1951	Richmond	5 (0)

Career highlights
- Richmond reserves best and fairest: 1951; North Kew best and fairest: 1956

Len Gardner (16 February 1931 – 17 May 2025) was an Australian rules football player who played for Richmond in the Victorian Football League (VFL).

Prior to his senior debut in 1951, Gardner played for Richmond in the VFL reserves competition from 1948 until the end of the 1951 season.

After leaving Richmond, Gardner played for Box Hill in the Victorian Football Association in 1952 and 1953. He also played for North Kew in the Eastern Suburban Football League (ESFL), where he won the club's best and fairest award in 1956 and played in a premiership in 1957.

Gardner died on 17 May 2025, at the age of 94.
