= Heidi K. Gardner =

American advisor

- Education: University of Pennsylvania; London School of Economics; London Business School
- Occupations: Author, professor, consultant
- Known for: Smart collaboration
- Website: www.gardnerandco.co

Heidi K. Gardner is an American advisor and facilitator for businesses and organizations. She is a Distinguished Fellow at Harvard Law School's Center on the Legal Profession and former professor at Harvard Business School. She is the faculty chair and instructor of the Smarter Collaboration Master Class and Sector Leadership Master Class at Harvard Law School, and an instructor in multiple executive education programs at Harvard Business School.

Gardner has authored (or co-authored) more than 100 books, chapters, case studies, and articles. This includes Smart Collaboration: How Professionals and Their Firms Succeed by Breaking Down Silos and its successor Smarter Collaboration: A New Approach to Breaking Down Barriers and Transforming Work. Her research has been featured in major media outlets around the globe, including Harvard Business Review, The Economist, Time, Boston Globe, Fast Company, Chief Executive, The National Law Review, Financial Times, MSN.com, CNN Money, Fortune.com, and CBSNews.com.

Gardner has lived and worked on four continents, including as a Fulbright Fellow, and for McKinsey & Company and Procter & Gamble. She earned her BA in Japanese Studies from the University of Pennsylvania (Phi Beta Kappa, Summa Cum Laude), a master's degree from the London School of Economics, and a second master's and PhD from London Business School.

== Books ==
- Gardner, Heidi K.; Normand-Hochman, Rebecca (2015). Leadership for Lawyers: Essential Leadership Strategies for Law Firm Success. London: Globe Law and Business. ISBN 978-1-909416-78-9.
- Gardner, Heidi K.; Gillespie, Anusia E. (2018). Smart Collaboration for Lateral Hiring: Successful Strategies to Recruit and Integrate Laterals in Law Firms. Globe Law And Business. ISBN 978-1-78742-196-7.
- Gardner, Heidi K. (2017). Smart Collaboration: How Professionals and Their Firms Succeed by Breaking Down Silos. Boston: Harvard Business Review Press. ISBN 978-1-63369-110-0.
- Gardner, Heidi K.; Matviak, Ivan (2022). Smarter Collaboration: A New Approach to Breaking Down Barriers and Transforming Work. Boston: Harvard Business Review Press. ISBN 978-1-64782-274-3.

== Articles ==
- Anand, N.; Gardner, Heidi K.; Morris, Timothy (2007). "Knowledge-Based Innovation: Emergence and Embedding of New Practice Areas in Management Consulting Firms". Academy of Management Journal. 50 (2): 406–428. doi:10.5465/amj.2007.24634457. JSTOR 20159861. S2CID 167806126.
- Gardner, Heidi K.; Anand, N.; Morris, Timothy (2008). "Chartering New Territory: Diversification, Legitimacy, and Practice Area Creation in Professional Service Firms". Journal of Organizational Behavior. 29 (8): 1101–1121. doi:10.1002/job.557. JSTOR 20542517. S2CID 145591240.
- Gardner, Heidi K. (2012). "Performance Pressure as a Double-edged Sword: Enhancing Team Motivation but Undermining the Use of Team Knowledge". Administrative Science Quarterly. 57 (1): 1–46. doi:10.1177/0001839212446454. S2CID 145330555.
- Gardner, Heidi K. (2012). "Coming Through When It Matters Most: How Great Teams Do Their Best Work Under Pressure". Harvard Business Review (April Issue).
- Gardner, Heidi K.; Gino, Francesca; Staats, Bradley R. (2012). "Dynamically Integrating Knowledge in Teams: Transforming Resources into Performance". Academy of Management Journal. 55 (4): 998–1022. doi:10.5465/amj.2010.0604. S2CID 144855730.
- Wageman, Ruth; Gardner, Heidi K.; Mortensen, Mark (2012). "Teams have changed: Catching up to the future". Industrial and Organizational Psychology: Perspectives on Science and Practice. 5 (1): 48–52. doi:10.1111/j.1754-9434.2011.01404.x. S2CID 145297725.
- Wageman, Ruth; Gardner, Heidi K.; Mortensen, Mark (2012). "The changing ecology of teams: New directions for teams research". Journal of Organizational Behavior. 33 (3): 301–315. doi:10.1002/job.1775.
- Gardner, Heidi K. (2015). "When Senior Managers Won't Collaborate: Lessons from Professional Service Firms". Harvard Business Review (March Issue).
- Mortensen, Mark; Gardner, Heidi K. (2017). "The Overcommitted Organization". Harvard Business Review (September - October Issue): 58–65.
- Gardner, Heidi K. (2017). "Getting Your Stars to Collaborate". Harvard Business Review (January - February Issue): 100–108.
- Gardner, Heidi K. (2022). "Performance Management Shouldn't Kill Collaboration". Harvard Business Review (September - October Issue).
