= Gardner =

Gardner may refer to:

== People and fictional characters ==
- Gardner (given name), including a list of people
- Gardner (surname), including a list of people and fictional characters

== Places ==
=== United States ===
- Gardner, Colorado
- Gardner, Illinois
- Gardner, Kansas
- Gardner, Massachusetts
- Gardner, North Dakota
- Gardner, Tennessee
- Gardner, Wisconsin
- Gardner Mountain, Washington state
- Gardner Pinnacles Hawaii
- Gardner Point, a mountain in Glacier National Park, Montana
- Gardner River, Yellowstone National Park, Montana and Wyoming

=== Elsewhere ===
- Gardner Inlet in Antarctica
- Gardner Canal in British Columbia, Canada
- Gardner Island or Nikumaroro, part of the Phoenix Islands, Kiribati
- Gardner (crater) on the Moon

== Other uses ==
- L. Gardner and Sons Ltd., Manchester, England, a builder of diesel engines
- Gardner (automobile), a car maker based in St. Louis, Missouri, between 1920 and 1931
- Gardner snake, any species of North American snake within the genus Thamnophis, more properly called garter snakes
- Gardner gun, an early machine gun

== See also ==
- Gardner's syndrome
- Gardener
- Gardiner (disambiguation)
- Gairdner, a surname
- Gairdner, Western Australia
