= David J. Wald =

American seismologist (born 1962)

David J. "Dave" Wald
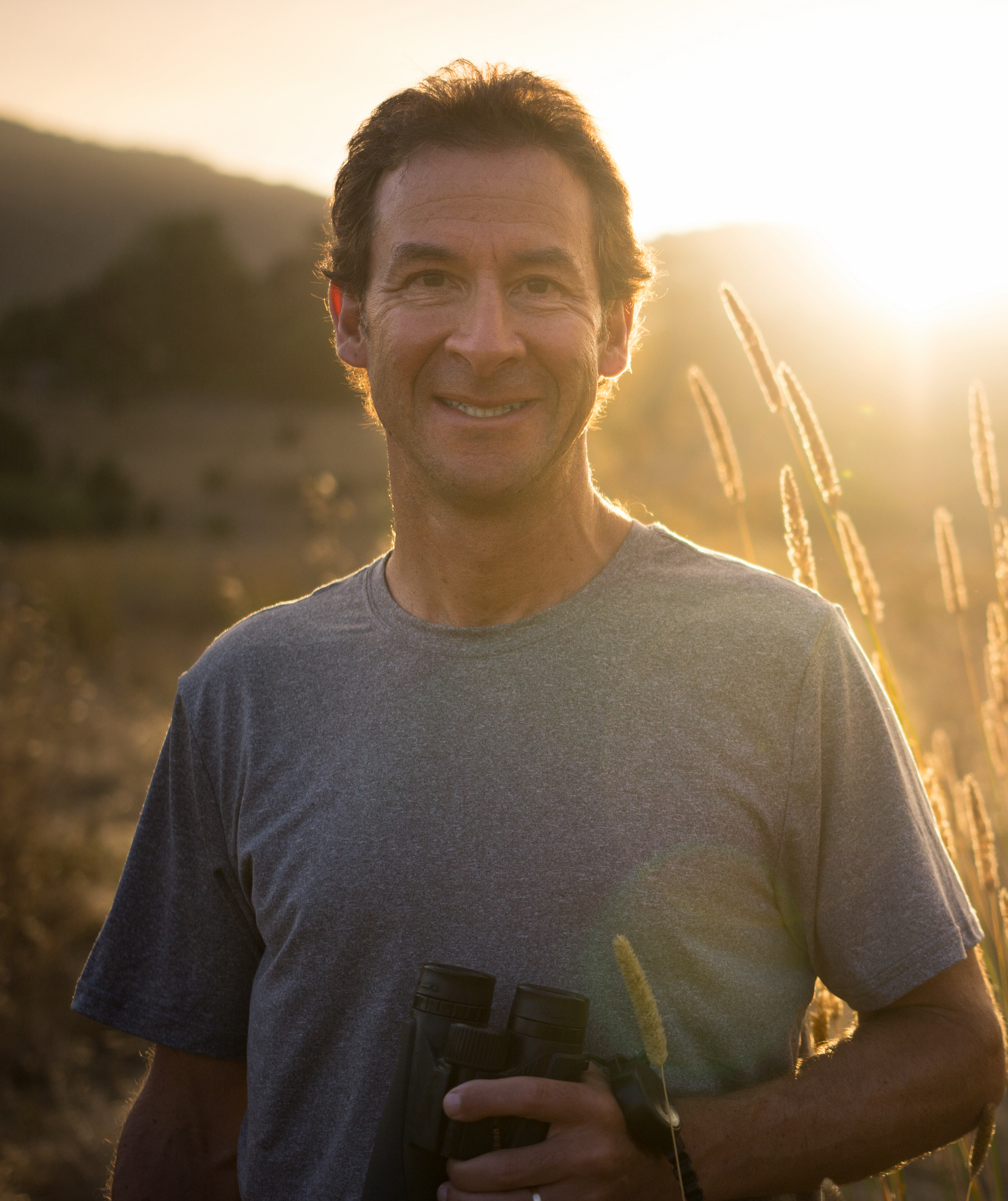
- Born: David Jay Wald; May 6, 1962 (age 64); Greenwich, Connecticut
- Known for: PAGER; ShakeMap
- Board member of: Seismological Society of America (Board of Directors, 2009–2011); Earthquake Engineering Research Institute (Board of Directors, 2015–2017)
- Spouse: Lisa Wald

Academic background
- Education: St. Lawrence University (BS); University of Arizona (MS); California Institute of Technology (PhD)
- Website: usgs.gov/staff-profiles/david-j-wald

David Jay Wald (born 1962) is a seismologist with the U.S. Geological Survey (USGS) at the National Earthquake Information Center (NEIC) in Golden, Colorado. He is an affiliated faculty member at the Colorado School of Mines, and served as the editor-in-chief of the Earthquake Engineering Research Institute's (EERI) journal, Earthquake Spectra, from 2018 to 2022. He also served on the Southern California Earthquake Center Science Planning Committee, 2014–2020.

Wald is involved in the research, development, and operations of real-time information systems at the USGS National Earthquake Information Center. He has developed and manages products such as ShakeMap and the community-science system Did You Feel It?. He is also responsible for developing other systems for post-earthquake response and pre-earthquake mitigation, such as ShakeCast and PAGER. He has also contributed to the USGS Ground Failure product. As well as management of these systems, Wald's research also focuses on characterization of rupture processes from complex earthquakes, analysis of ground motions and site effects, and modeling earthquake-induced events.

On top of his publications, Wald is also known for hosting events and giving lectures about geophysics topics, including a "Provost’s Lecture" at Stony Brook University and an EERI Younger Members Committee webinar.

== Early life and education ==
David J. Wald was born on May 6, 1962, in Greenwich, Connecticut.

Wald received his B.S. in Geology and Physics from St. Lawrence University in 1984. He then completed his M.S. in Geophysics from the University of Arizona in 1986. He worked in Pasadena, California for Woodward-Clyde Consultants from 1986 to 1988 on seismic hazard assessments for the Diablo Canyon Power Plant. David went on to the California Institute of Technology (Caltech) in Pasadena and was awarded his Ph.D. in geophysics in 1993.

Wald then began working at the USGS in Pasadena in 1993 as a National Research Council Post-Doctoral Fellow and stayed on there as a researcher. He and his wife, Lisa Wald, who also works for the USGS, later transferred to the Golden, Colorado USGS office to work at the NEIC.

== Products ==
Wald was a developer of PAGER, a post-earthquake analytic system. He is also the primary developer and distributor of ShakeMap. Other products of note developed or managed by Wald include:

=== Did You Feel It? ===
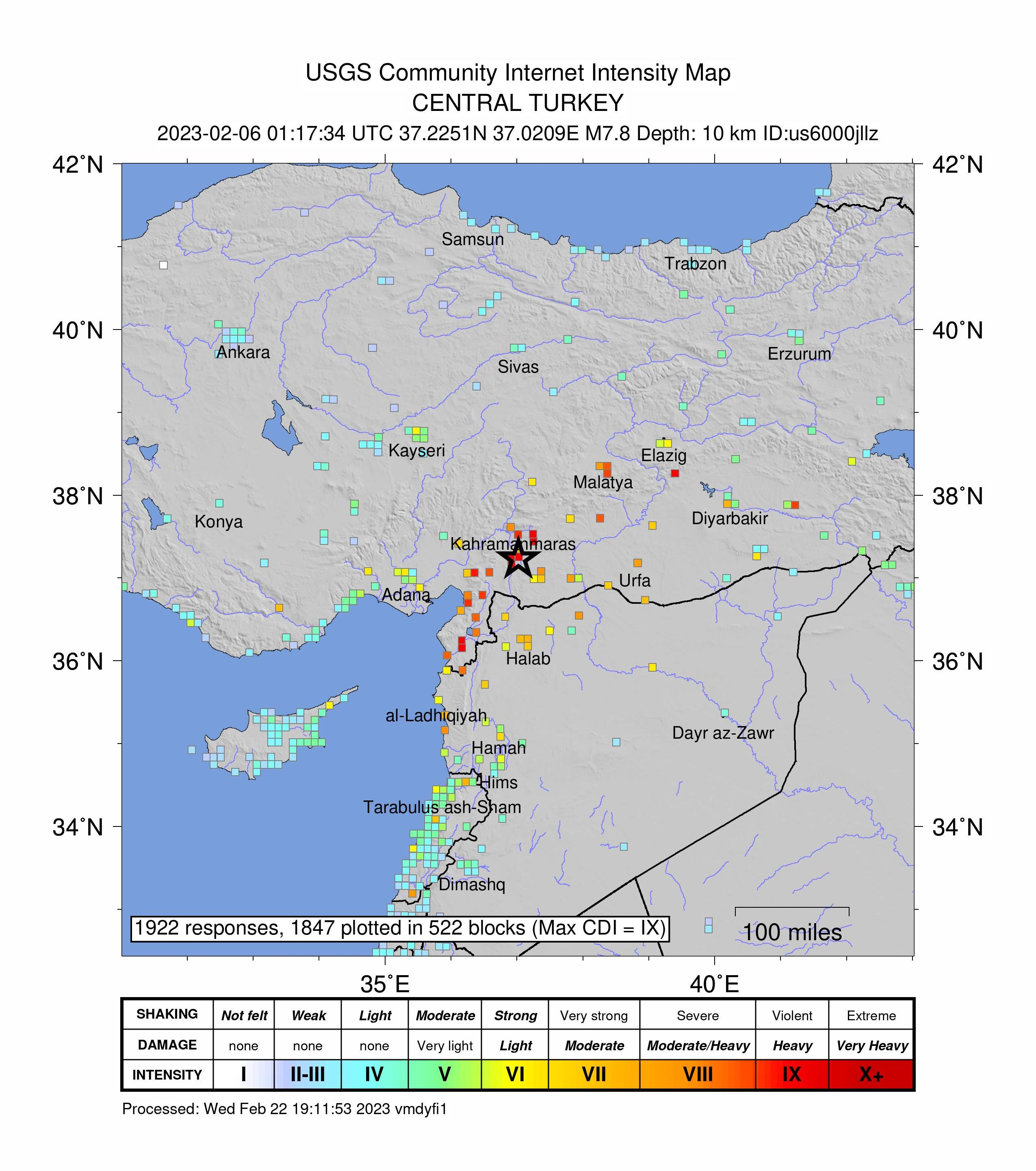
Did You Feel It? civilian responses to the 2023 Turkey earthquake.

For Did You Feel It? (DYFI), Wald leveraged the work of Lori Dengler and Jim Dewey following the Northridge earthquake. Their large volume of macroseismic phone surveys motivated them to create a "community decimal intensity" by assigning numerical values to individual questionnaire responses that they could calibrate against the Modified Mercalli Intensity scale, the macroseismic intensity scale in use in the U.S. The numerical assignment of intensities from questionnaires lent itself naturally to automating the entire process of data collection, intensity assignment, and publishing via the internet, which today creates community-sourced maps of perceived intensity after an earthquake.

DYFI has been operating for over two decades (1999–present) in the U.S. and over 18 years globally. The survey has collected over 6 million individual DYFI intensity reports during that period. DYFI allows for high rates and quantities of macroseismic data collection. High-quality MMI maps can be made almost immediately with complete coverage at a higher resolution than in the past.

=== ShakeCast ===
In and around 2000, via contacts with the Caltech ERA, Wald began interacting with many utility and lifeline operators. A common query was, "Given a ShakeMap, how can I tell what the level of shaking was at each of my facilities?” Working initially with Phil Naecker, an IT and infrastructure consultant, and with support from Loren Turner of the California Department of Transportation (Caltrans), David's team prototyped ShakeCast—short for ShakeMap Broadcast. ShakeCast was developed as a post-earthquake situational awareness application that automatically retrieves earthquake shaking data from ShakeMap to compare ground shaking intensity measures against a user's facilities.

ShakeCast is now a fully automated software system for delivering specific ShakeMap products to critical users and triggering established post-earthquake response protocols. ShakeCast generates potential damage assessments and inspection priority notifications, maps, and web-based products for critical users, emergency managers, and anyone specified on a need-to-know basis.

== Honors ==
- 2004 – Incorporated Research Institutions for Seismology & Seismological Society of America's Distinguished Lecturer
- 2009 – Seismological Society of America's Frank Press Public Service Award
- 2010 – U.S. Department of the Interior Superior Service Award
- 2014 – Earthquake Engineering Research Institute Distinguished Lecturer
- 2016 – U.S. Department of the Interior Meritorious Service Award
- 2021 – American Geophysical Union Fellow
- 2021 – U.S. Geological Survey Shoemaker Lifetime Achievement Award in Communications
- 2022 – SSA and EERI's William B. Joyner Memorial Lecturer

== Research output ==
As per Scopus, Wald has over 11 thousand citations and an h-index of 50, whereas according to Google Scholar, he boasts over 21 thousand citations and a 67 h-index. Semantic Scholar lists him between the two, with over 15 thousand citations and a 57 h.

Selected publications since 2020:

- Heath, David C; Wald, David J; Worden, C Bruce; Thompson, Eric M; Smoczyk, Gregory M (2020-06-09). "A global hybrid V_{S}_{30} map with a topographic slope–based default and regional map insets". Earthquake Spectra. 36 (3): 1570–1584. Bibcode:2020EarSp..36.1570H. doi:10.1177/8755293020911137. ISSN 8755-2930. S2CID 221105084.
- Langenbruch, Cornelius; Ellsworth, William L.; Woo, Jeong-Ung; Wald, David J. (2020-01-23). "Value at Induced Risk: Injection-Induced Seismic Risk From Low-Probability, High-Impact Events". Geophysical Research Letters. 47 (2). Bibcode:2020GeoRL..4785878L. doi:10.1029/2019gl085878. ISSN 0094-8276. S2CID 214344271.
- Noh, Hae Young; Jaiswal, Kishor S; Engler, Davis; Wald, David J (2020-08-27). "An efficient Bayesian framework for updating PAGER loss estimates". Earthquake Spectra. 36 (4): 1719–1742. Bibcode:2020EarSp..36.1719N. doi:10.1177/8755293020944177. ISSN 8755-2930. S2CID 225202047.
- Quitoriano, Vincent; Wald, David J. (2020-05-20). "USGS "Did You Feel It?"—Science and Lessons From 20 Years of Citizen Science-Based Macroseismology". Frontiers in Earth Science. 8: 120. Bibcode:2020FrEaS...8..120Q. doi:10.3389/feart.2020.00120. ISSN 2296-6463.
- Wald, David J.; Seligson, Hope A.; Rozelle, Jesse; Burns, Jordan; Marano, Kristin; Jaiswal, Kishor S.; Hearne, Michael; Bausch, Douglas (2020-01-20). "A domestic earthquake impact alert protocol based on the combined USGS PAGER and FEMA Hazus loss estimation systems". Earthquake Spectra. 36 (1): 164–182. Bibcode:2020EarSp..36..164W. doi:10.1177/8755293019878187. ISSN 8755-2930.
- Wald, David; Quitoriano, Vincent; Dully, Oliver (2021-02-22). "Amateur Radio Operators Help Fill Earthquake Donut Holes". Eos. 102. Bibcode:2021EOSTr.10255013W. doi:10.1029/2021eo155013. ISSN 2324-9250.
- Wald, David J (2020-04-12). "Practical limitations of earthquake early warning". Earthquake Spectra. 36 (3): 1412–1447. Bibcode:2020EarSp..36.1412W. doi:10.1177/8755293020911388. ISSN 8755-2930.
- Wald, David J; Worden, C Bruce; Thompson, Eric M; Hearne, Michael (2021-07-22). "ShakeMap operations, policies, and procedures". Earthquake Spectra. 38 (1): 756–777. doi:10.1177/87552930211030298. ISSN 8755-2930. S2CID 237725789.
