= Joe C. Gardner =

American politician (1944–2013)

Joe C. Gardner (April 6, 1944 – February 4, 2013) was an American politician.

From Batesville, Mississippi, Gardner was a Vietnam War era veteran and a hospital chaplain at Tri Lakes Hospital. Gardner served in the Mississippi House of Representatives for District 11, as a Democrat, from 2007 until his death. He was also the associate Pastor of Macedonia Missionary Baptist Church.

Gardner served in United States Army and retired from the Mississippi Army National Guard. He was a commander and charter member of Veterans of Foreign Wars Post 12121. He was the pastor of Greater Concord Missionary Baptist Church west of Batesville. He owned a commercial truck driving school, and was a trustee on the South Panola School Board.
