= Daniel Gardner (musician) =

Canadian electronic musician

Daniel Gardner is a Canadian electronic musician known better by his artist name Frivolous. Born in 1980, near Vancouver, B.C., Gardner received early training in classical piano, but found his calling when he undertook Electronic Music studies. He moved to Montreal in the early 2000s and then to Berlin in 2005. In 2012, Gardner returned to Canada's west coast, while continuing to maintain his Berlin ties and tour internationally.

Though Gardner is included in the techno and house genres, his style is also described as jazz-inflected microhouse. He is known for his improvised live performances which have included his DIY instruments such as the electromagnetic knife. He has more than 40 releases to his credit, including the 2014 album Lost and Forgotten, which followed his third full-length album, Meteorology, released in 2011, on Luciano's Cadenza label.

== Discography ==
=== Albums ===
- Somewhere In The Suburbs (2004)
- Midnight Black Indulgence (2007)
- Meteorology (2011)
- Lost and Forgotten (2014)

=== Singles and EPs ===
- Crankkongestion (2002)
- Romantek EP (2003)
- 40 Inch EP (2003)
- Whonnock BC EP (2004)
- Coquitlam BC (2004)
- XXX EP (2005)
- Impermeable Disguise 12" (2005)
- Kevork Motion EP (2005)
- Buffet Haraja 12" (2005)
- Frivolous vs The Phantom 12" (2006)
- Midnight Black Indulgence 12", EP (2007)
- The Emoticon Don EP (2008)
- Moonshine EP (2008)
- Island of Sanctity 12" (2008)
- Couples Therapy (2009)
- C: My Consciousness (2011)
- Sauna Stranger EP (2014)
