= Donald Stanley Gardner =

Donald Stanley Gardner, from Intel Corporation, Santa Clara, California, was named a Fellow of the Institute of Electrical and Electronics Engineers (IEEE) in 2012 for his contributions to integrated circuit interconnects and integrated inductor technology.
