= PAGER =

U.S. Geological Survey-operated monitoring system for earthquakes

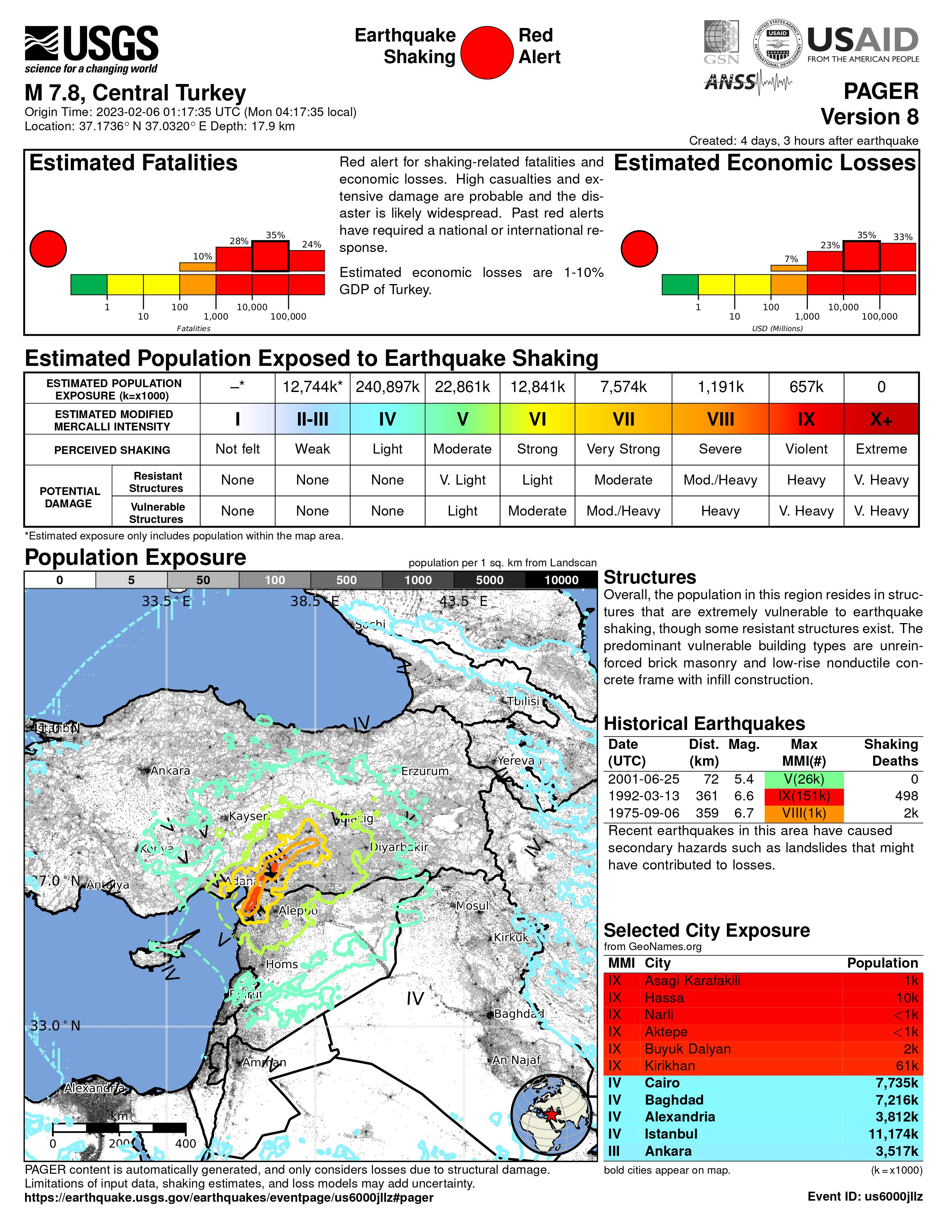
Single-page example of a PAGER automated response following the 2023 Turkey earthquake.

Prompt Assessment of Global Earthquakes for Response (PAGER) is a monitoring system for earthquakes. The service is operated by the United States Geological Survey, from its office in Golden, Colorado.

It provides fatality and economic loss impact estimates following significant earthquakes worldwide. USGS seismologist David J. Wald leads development of the system.

The primary purpose of the PAGER system is to inform emergency responders, government and aid agencies, and the media regarding the potential scope of the disaster. Earthquake alerts—formerly sent based on event magnitude and location or population exposure to shaking—are generated based on the estimated range of fatalities and economic losses.

PAGER is now an automated system that generates information concerning the impact of significant earthquakes worldwide within approximately 20 minutes of any magnitude 5.4 or greater events. PAGER rapidly assesses earthquake impacts by combining data about populations exposed to estimated levels of shaking intensity with models of economic and fatality losses based on past earthquakes in each country or region of the world.

== See also ==
- Earthquake casualty estimation
