= Thomas Gardener =

English politician

Thomas Gardener (died 1408/09), of Dorchester, Dorset, was an English politician.

== Family ==
He was married to a woman named Petronilla.

== Career ==
He was a member (MP) of the parliament of England for Dorchester in September 1388 and 1393.
