= Gardiner (surname) =

Gardiner is an English surname. Notable people with the surname include:

- Addison Gardiner (1797–1883), New York Lieutenant Governor and judge
- Ainsley Gardiner, New Zealand film producer
- Sir Alan Gardiner (1879–1963), English Egyptologist
- Albert Gardiner, Australian politician
- Alfred George Gardiner (1865–1946), English journalist and essayist
- Allen Francis Gardiner (1794–1851), English missionary
- Asa Bird Gardiner (1839–1919), American lawyer and politician
- Barry Gardiner (born 1957), Scottish politician
- Bernard Gardiner (c. 1668–1726), English academic administrator
- Boris Gardiner (born 1943), Jamaican reggae musician
- Charlie Gardiner (ice hockey player) (1904–1934), Scottish-born Canadian ice hockey player
- Charles Gardiner (1720–1769), Irish politician and landowner
- Charles Gardiner, 1st Earl of Blessington (1782–1829), socialite
- Chittampalam Abraham Gardiner, Sri Lankan businessman and Catholic activist
- Chris Gardiner (born 1986), Scottish footballer
- Clive Gardiner (1891–1960), artist, illustrator and designer
- Crispin Gardiner (born 1942), New Zealand physicist
- Darcy Gardiner (born 1995), Australian rules footballer
- David Gardiner (footballer) (born 1957), Guatemalan footballer
- Eve Gardiner (1913–1992), English beautician and make-up artist
- Frank Gardiner, Scottish-born Australian bushranger
- Fred Gardiner, Toronto politician
- Frederick Gardiner (1850–1919), British shipowner, explorer and mountaineer
- Sir George Gardiner (politician) (1935–2002), English politician
- George Gardiner, multiple people
- Gerald Gardiner, Baron Gardiner (1900–1990), Lord Chancellor of the United Kingdom
- Harry Gardiner (1871–c. 1933), American buildings climber
- Harry Gardiner (footballer), Scottish footballer
- Henry Balfour Gardiner (1877–1950), English composer
- Henry John Gardiner (businessman) (1843–1940), English clothing wholesaler
- Herb Gardiner (1891–1972), Canadian ice hockey player
- Ian Gardiner (disambiguation), multiple people
- Jake Gardiner, Canadian hockey player
- James Gardiner (British Army officer) (1688–1745), Scottish soldier
- James Garfield Gardiner (1883–1962), Canadian politician
- James Henry Gardiner, Australian footballer
- James McDonald Gardiner, (1857–1925), American architect, educator and lay missionary to Japan
- James Terry Gardiner (1842–1912), American surveyor
- Jane Gardiner, schoolmistress, grammarian
- Jeane Gardiner, Bermudian alleged witch
- Jennifer Gardiner (born 2001), Canadian ice hockey player
- John Gardiner (Australia) (1873–1878), Irish-born settler in Australia
- Sir John Eliot Gardiner (born 1943), English conductor
- John Reynolds Gardiner, American novelist
- John Stanley Gardiner (1872–1946), British zoologist
- John Sylvester John Gardiner (1765–1830), Welsh-born American clergyman
- John Gardiner (businessman) (born 1936), British businessman
- Joseph Gardiner (Western Australian politician) (1886–1965), Australian politician
- Joseph Gardiner (New South Wales politician) (1879–1941), Australian politician
- Joe Gardiner, English footballer
- Les Gardiner (Scottish footballer) (1918–1991)
- Lion Gardiner (1599–1663), English settler in New York
- Luke Gardiner (1690–1755), Irish politician
- Luke Gardiner, 1st Viscount Mountjoy (1745–1798), Irish politician and property developer
- Marguerite Gardiner, Countess of Blessington (1789–1849), Irish writer
- Marshall G. Gardiner (1912–1999), American journalist and politician
- Michael Gardiner, Australian footballer
- Muriel Gardiner, American psychiatrist
- Pauline Gardiner, New Zealand politician
- Peter Gardiner, Swedish actor and dancer
- Reginald Gardiner (1903–1980), English actor
- Richard Gardiner (disambiguation), multiple people
- Ricky Gardiner, Scottish musician
- Robert Gardiner (disambiguation), multiple people
- Samuel B. Gardiner (1815–1882), American politician
- Samuel Rawson Gardiner (1829–1902), English historian
- Silvester Gardiner (1707–1786), American physician and land developer
- Simon Gardiner (born 1975), world record neck size
- Stephen Gardiner (c. 1493–1555), English Lord Chancellor and bishop
- Steven Gardiner (born 1995), Bahamian sprinter
- Susan Gardiner (born 1980), Canadian water polo player
- Timea Gardiner (born 2003), British-American basketball player
- Thomas A. Gardiner (1832–1881), New York politician
- Toni Avril Gardiner (born 1941), known as Princess Muna al-Hussein, second wife of King Hussein of Jordan
- Vianna Gardiner, Bahamian politician
- William Gardiner (botanist) (1808–1852), Scottish poet, botanist and umbrella maker
- William Guthrie Gardiner, shipowner and philanthropist
- Wrey Gardiner (1901–1981), English writer, poet, editor and publisher

== See also ==
- Lord Gardiner (disambiguation)
- Baron Gardiner
- Gaertner
- Gardiner (disambiguation)
- Gardner (disambiguation)
- Gardinier
