= Les Gardiner =

Les Gardiner or Gardner may refer to:

- Les Gardiner (Scottish footballer), Scottish association footballer for Torquay United
- Les Gardiner (Australian footballer) (born 1923), former Australian rules footballer
- Les Gardner
