= Compher =

Compher is a surname. Notable people with the surname include:

- J. T. Compher (born 1995), American ice hockey player
- Jesse Compher (born 1999), American ice hockey player
