= Jesse Compher =

American ice hockey player (born 1999)

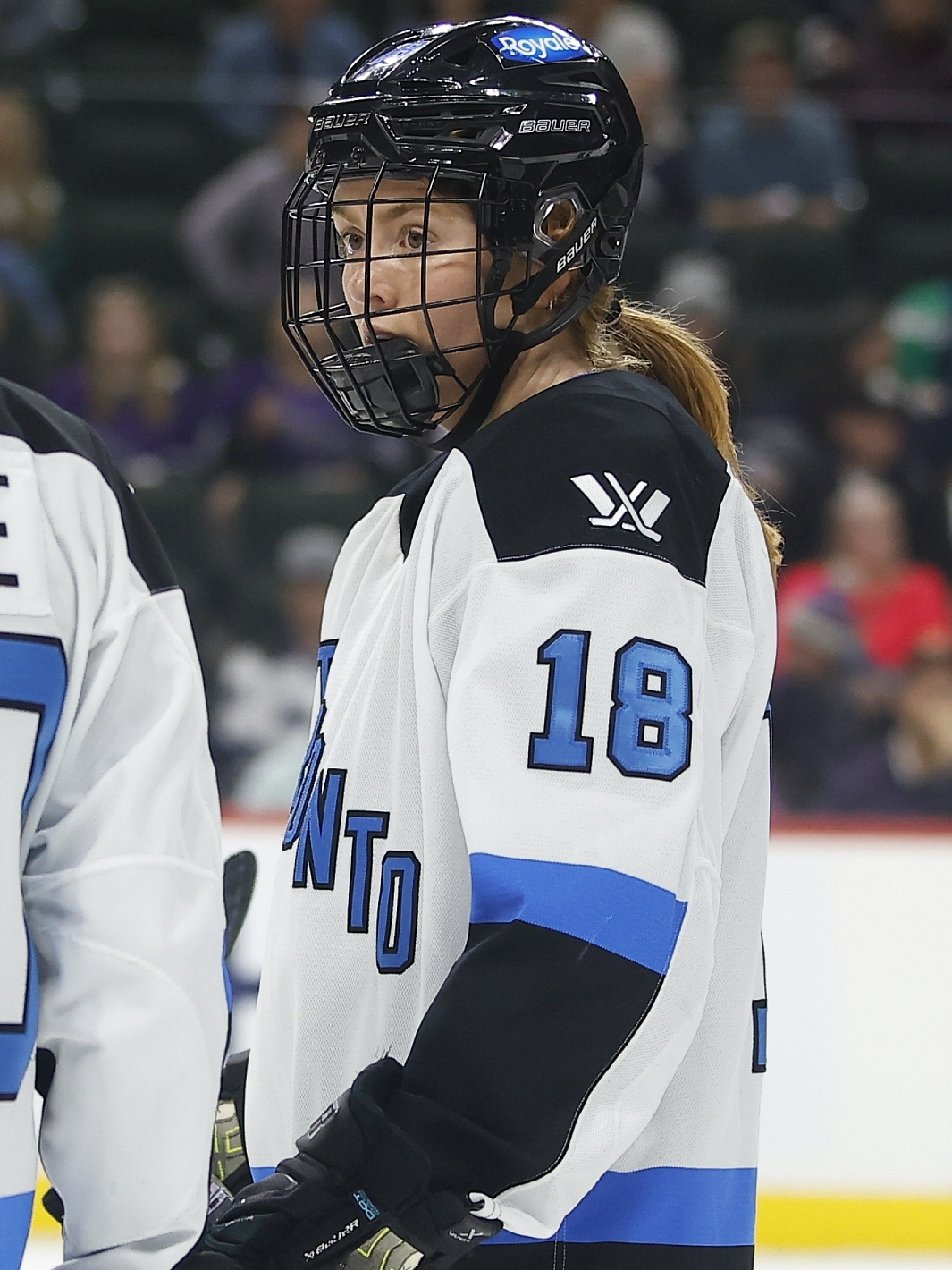
- Compher with PWHL Toronto in 2024
- Born: July 1, 1999 (age 27) Northbrook, Illinois, U.S.
- Height: 5 ft 8 in (173 cm)
- Weight: 161 lb (73 kg; 11 st 7 lb)
- Position: Forward
- Shoots: Right
- PWHL team Former teams: Detroit Clutch; Toronto Sceptres
- National team: United States
- Playing career: 2017–present
Medal record
Olympic Games
Silver medal – second place	2022 Beijing	Team
World Championships
Gold medal – first place	2019 Finland
Gold medal – first place	2025 Czechia
Gold medal – first place	2026 Denmark
Silver medal – second place	2021 Canada
Silver medal – second place	2022 Denmark
World U18 Championships
Gold medal – first place	2016 Canada
Gold medal – first place	2017 Czech Republic

Jesse Compher (born July 1, 1999) is an American professional ice hockey player for the Detroit Clutch of the Professional Women's Hockey League (PWHL) and member of the United States women's national ice hockey team. She played college ice hockey at Boston University, where she was the Hockey East scoring champion in 2019. She helped Wisconsin win the 2023 NCAA National Championship.

Compher won a silver medal at the 2022 Winter Olympics and is a two-time world champion, winning gold at the 2019 and 2025 World Championships.

== Early life ==
Born in Northbrook, Illinois, to parents Bob and Valerie Compher, Jesse was raised with her two older siblings: Morgan and brother J. T. Compher, who plays in the National Hockey League for the Detroit Red Wings. She attended Hickory Point Elementary School, Shabonee School, and Wood Oaks Junior High School in Northbrook, before graduating from Glenbrook North High School in 2017.

Compher began playing hockey at the local sports center and was inspired by watching her older brother play, "I was always at this rink watching him (J.T.), so I thought I might as well try, and then I fell in love with it." Compher played youth hockey for the Chicago Mission U19 team for three seasons, serving as team captain during her final two years. With the Mission, she won a national championship in 2014–15, finished as runner-up at the national championships in 2016–17, and helped her team to a third-place finish in 2015–16. She also won four consecutive state championships with the Mission.

== Playing career ==
=== College ===
==== Boston University (2017–2021) ====
Compher began her collegiate career for the Boston University Terriers during the 2017–18 season. She made her debut for the Terriers on September 23, 2017, in a game against Merrimack. She recorded her first two collegiate goals on November 28, 2017, in a 6–4 victory over Brown. She finished the season with nine goals and 17 assists in 37 games for the Terriers, ranking third on the team in points. Her 17 assists ranked second in the league among rookies. Following an outstanding freshman season, she was named to the Hockey East All-Rookie Team.

During the 2018–19 season, she led Hockey East in scoring and ranked third in the NCAA, recording 17 goals and 44 assists in 37 games. Her 44 assists were a program record, and she became the second player in program history to surpass 60 points during a season. On December 8, 2018, she posted a career-high five points, including an NCAA-best four assists, in an 8–0 victory over RIT. She was subsequently named the Hockey East Player of the Week, and NCAA First Star of the Week. Compher was named the Hockey East Player of the Month for the month of December after leading the nation in points (11) and assists (8). Following an outstanding season, she was named a Hockey East First Team All-Star, a Second Team CCM/AHCA Hockey All-American and a top ten finalist for the Patty Kazmaier Award. On April 13, 2020, Compher was named team captain for the Terriers. During the 2020–21 season, she led the team in scoring, with seven goals and 11 points in eight games. Following the season, she was named a Hockey East Second Team All-Star.

==== Wisconsin (2022–2023) ====
On April 14, 2022, after spending the 2021–22 season with the U.S. national team, Compher announced she was transferring to Wisconsin for her final year of NCAA eligibility. During the 2022–23 season, in her graduate year with Wisconsin, Compher served as an assistant captain and recorded 16 goals and 24 assists for 40 points. She played a key role in Wisconsin's championship run, recording four points (two goals, two assists) in the regional semifinal against LIU and providing two assists, including one on the game-winning goal, in the Frozen Four semifinal victory over Minnesota. The Badgers defeated Ohio State 1–0 in the championship game to claim Wisconsin's seventh NCAA title, fulfilling Compher's goal of winning a national championship. Following the season, she was named to the NCAA All-Tournament Team.

=== Professional ===
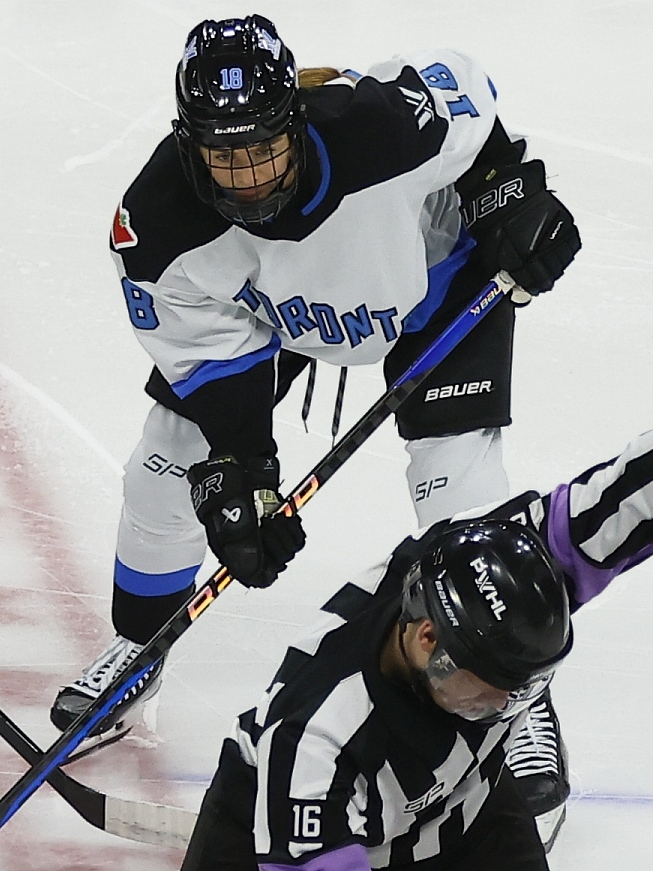
Compher with Toronto in 2024.

==== Toronto Sceptres (2024–2025) ====
On September 18, 2023, Compher was drafted in the fifth round, 26th overall, by PWHL Toronto in the 2023 PWHL Draft. She signed a two-year contract with Toronto on November 7, 2023.

Compher recorded one goal and four assists in 24 regular season games during the 2024 season, scoring the go-ahead goal in a 3–0 victory over Montreal in the Battle on Bay Street, in front of a record-breaking crowd of 19,285 fans at Scotiabank Arena. Toronto finished first in the regular season standings with 47 points, earning the top playoff seed. In Game 2 of the PWHL Playoffs, she scored the go-ahead goal with 1:25 remaining in the third period, tipping in a point shot from Renata Fast to give Toronto a 1–0 lead as they secured a 2–0 victory and a 2–0 series lead. Despite winning the first two games, Toronto lost the next three games and was eliminated from the playoffs, with Compher finishing with one goal in five games.

During the 2024–25 season, Compher significantly improved her production, finishing fourth on the team in scoring with nine goals and nine assists in 30 regular season games. Her nine goals ranked third on the Sceptres behind Daryl Watts and Hannah Miller. Toronto finished second in the regular season with a 15-9-6 record and 48 points. During the 2025 PWHL playoffs, Toronto again faced Minnesota in the semifinals. In Game 3, a historic 7–5 Minnesota victory that became the highest-scoring game in PWHL playoff history, Compher recorded two assists—the first multi-point playoff game of her career—bringing her series total to three assists. Compher finished the playoffs with three assists in four games as Toronto was eliminated after a 4–3 overtime loss in Game 4.

Ahead of the 2025–26 season, Compher signed a two-year contract extension with Toronto. That season, she ranked third on the Sceptres in scoring with six goals and six assists in 30 regular season games, including her first multi-goal game in a 4–3 win over New York.

==== Detroit Clutch (2026–present) ====
During the league's expansion to 12 teams ahead of the 2026–27 season, Compher was left unprotected by the Sceptres and signed a three-year contract with the Detroit Clutch on June 8, 2026.

== International play ==
=== Junior ===
Compher represented the United States at the 2016 and 2017 IIHF World Women's U18 Championships, where she won gold.

=== Senior ===
Compher has been a member of the United States women's national ice hockey team since 2019, representing the United States at multiple World Championships and the Olympics.

==== IIHF World Championships ====
On March 1, 2019, Compher was named to the roster for the United States women's national ice hockey team ahead of the 2019 IIHF Women's World Championship, where she made her national team debut. At the tournament in Espoo, Finland, where she recorded one assist in six games and won a gold medal. On February 25, 2020, Compher was again named to the roster for the United States at the 2020 IIHF Women's World Championship, however, the tournament was cancelled due to the COVID-19 pandemic.

On March 30, 2021, Compher was again named to the roster for the United States at the 2021 IIHF Women's World Championship. She recorded her first senior national team goal against Russia during the tournament, as the United States won a silver medal.

Compher was also named to the roster for the 2022 IIHF Women's World Championship, where she scored a goal in the semifinals against Czechia as the United States won a silver medal. After being left off the 2023 and 2024 rosters, Compher returned to the team for the 2025 IIHF Women's World Championship, where the United States won gold.

==== Olympics ====
External videos
- Jesse Compher: 2022 Olympic Introduction, USA Hockey

On January 1, 2022, Compher was named to Team USA's roster to represent the United States at the 2022 Winter Olympics in Beijing. Compher recorded three goals and one assist in seven games as the United States won a silver medal. In the preliminary round, she recorded an assist in her Olympic debut against Finland and scored two goals against Switzerland, including two goals nine seconds apart in the first period to help secure an 8-0 win.

==== Rivalry Series ====
On December 11, 2025, Compher scored a goal in a 10-4 victory versus Canada. Held in Edmonton, Alberta, this was the third game of the 2025 Rivalry Series, marking the first time that the Canadian women's national ice hockey team allowed 10 goals in a loss to the United States.

== Personal life ==
Compher's brother, J. T. Compher, is a professional ice hockey player for the Detroit Red Wings in the National Hockey League (NHL).

== Career statistics ==
=== Regular season and playoffs ===
			Regular season					Playoffs
Season	Team	League	GP	G	A	Pts	PIM	GP	G	A	Pts	PIM
2017–18	Boston University	HE	37	9	17	26	20	—	—	—	—	—
2018–19	Boston University	HE	37	17	44	61	12	—	—	—	—	—
2019–20	Boston University	HE	26	13	16	29	21	—	—	—	—	—
2020–21	Boston University	HE	9	7	4	11	2	—	—	—	—	—
2022–23	University of Wisconsin	WCHA	41	16	24	40	39	—	—	—	—	—
2023–24	PWHL Toronto	PWHL	24	1	4	5	23	5	1	0	1	2
2024–25	Toronto Sceptres	PWHL	30	9	9	18	10	4	0	3	3	0
2025–26	Toronto Sceptres	PWHL	30	6	6	12	14	—	—	—	—	—
PWHL totals			84	16	19	35	47	9	1	3	4	2

=== International ===
Year	Team	Event	Result	GP	G	A	Pts	PIM
2016	United States	U18	1st place, gold medalist(s)	5	0	1	1	4
2017	United States	U18	1st place, gold medalist(s)	5	0	1	1	6
2019	United States	WC	1st place, gold medalist(s)	6	0	1	1	2
2021	United States	WC	2nd place, silver medalist(s)	6	1	2	3	4
2022	United States	OG	2nd place, silver medalist(s)	7	3	1	4	4
2022	United States	WC	2nd place, silver medalist(s)	7	1	1	2	2
2025	United States	WC	1st place, gold medalist(s)	6	0	0	0	0
Junior totals				10	0	2	2	10
Senior totals				32	5	5	10	12

== Awards and honors ==
Honors	Year	Ref
College
Hockey East All-Rookie Team	2018	
WHEA scoring champion	2019	
Hockey East First Team All-Star	2019	
CCM/AHCA Hockey Second Team All-American	2019	
Hockey East First Team All-Star	2020	
Hockey East Second Team All-Star	2021	
NCAA All-Tournament Team	2023	
