= 2025 IIHF Women's World Championship =

Ice hockey tournament in Czechia

Tournament details
- Host country: Czech Republic
- Venue: 1 (in 1 host city)
- Dates: 9–20 April
- Opened by: Petr Bříza; Martin Kuba; Dagmar Škodová Parmová
- Teams: 10

Final positions
- Champions: United States (11th title)
- Runners-up: Canada
- Third place: Finland
- Fourth place: Czechia

Tournament statistics
- Games played: 29
- Goals scored: 149 (5.14 per game)
- Attendance: 122,331 (4,218 per game)
- Scoring leader: (Canada) Marie-Philip Poulin (12 points)

Awards
- MVP: (Canada) Marie-Philip Poulin

Official website
- www.iihf.com

The 2025 IIHF Women's World Championship was the 24th edition of the Top Division of the Women's Ice Hockey World Championship organized by the International Ice Hockey Federation (IIHF). The tournament was contested in České Budějovice, Czech Republic from 9 to 20 April 2025 at the Budvar Arena.

The United States won their eleventh title, after a 4–3 overtime win in the final against Canada.

== Venue ==
České Budějovice
Budvar Arena
Capacity: 5,859
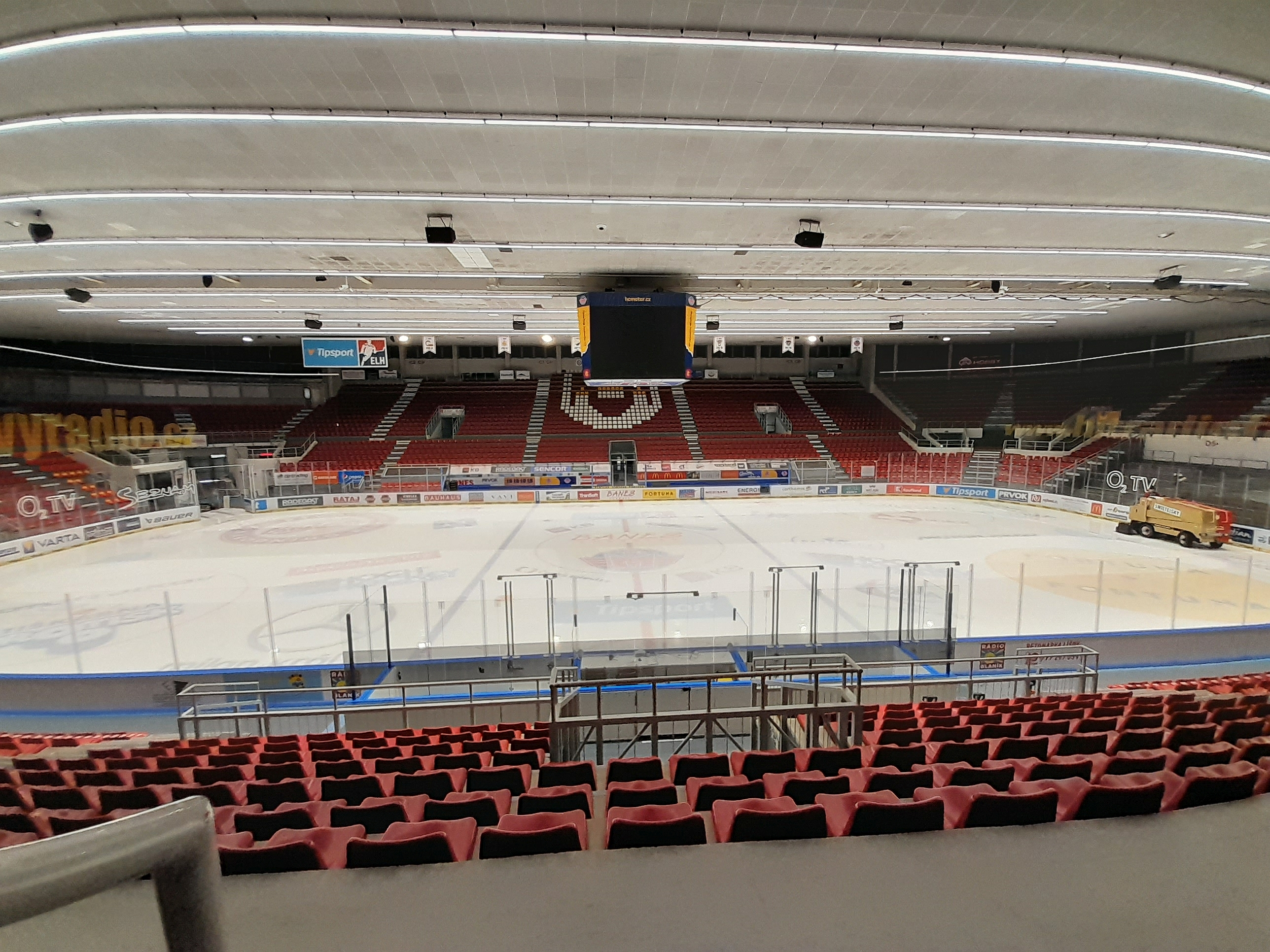

== Participants ==
Group A

- Canada
- United States
- Finland
- Czechia
- Switzerland

Group B

- Germany
- Sweden
- Japan
- Hungary – Promoted from Division I Group A in 2024
- Norway – Promoted from Division I Group A in 2024

== Format ==
The top five teams from the previous tournament were placed in Group A and the teams that finished sixth through eighth in the 2024 tournament, plus two teams promoted from 2024 Division IA, were placed in Group B. All of the teams in Group A and the top three teams from Group B continued to the knockout phase, while the bottom two teams from Group B were relegated. During the knockout stage, there was a re-seeding after the quarterfinals.

== Marketing ==
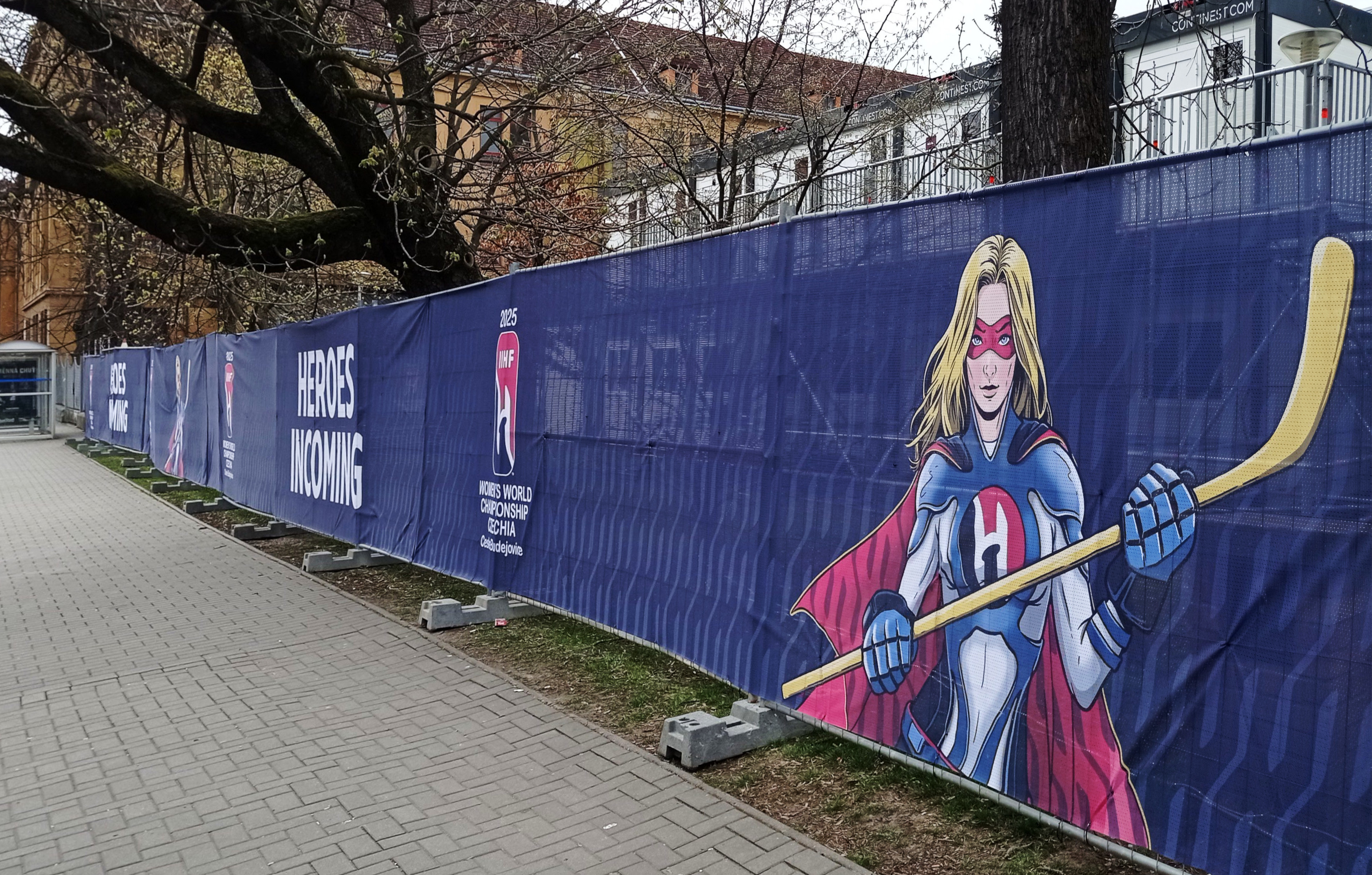
Championship motto, "Heroes Incoming" at the Budvar Arena in České Budějovice

The mascot was a superhero named Tori, whose name was chosen in an audience poll. The motto was "Hrdinky přicházejí" (marketed in English as "Heroes Incoming", but more precisely translated as "Heroines Incoming"). With 122,331 total spectators, the tournament broke the world championship attendance record previously held by the 2007 edition in Canada.

== Match officials ==
Twelve referees and twelve linesmen were selected for the tournament.

Referees	Linesmen
(Austria) Julia Kainberger; (Canada) Cianna Lieffers; (Canada) Elizabeth Mantha; (Canada) Michelle McKenna; (Canada) Shauna Neary; (Czech Republic) Zuzana Svobodová; (Finland) Anniina Nurmi; (Sweden) Ida Henriksson; (United States) Kelly Cooke; (United States) Melissa Doyle; (United States) Samantha Hiller; (United States) Amanda Tassoni	(Canada) Alex Clarke; (Canada) Laura Gutauskas; (Canada) Justine Todd; (Canada) Kirsten Welsh; (Canada) Erin Zach; (Czech Republic) Kristýna Hájková; (Finland) Tiina Saarimäki; (France) Alexia Cheyroux; (Germany) Leonie Ernst; (Sweden) Jessica Lundgren; (United States) Sarah Buckner; (United States) Jennifer Cameron

== Preliminary round ==
The groups were based on the final rankings from the previous tournament.

All times are local (UTC+2)

=== Group A ===
Pos	Team	Pld	W	OTW	OTL	L	GF	GA	GD	Pts	Qualification
1	United States	4	4	0	0	0	18	2	+16	12	Quarterfinals
2	Canada	4	3	0	0	1	17	3	+14	9	Quarterfinals
3	Finland	4	2	0	0	2	7	15	−8	6	Quarterfinals
4	Czechia (H)	4	1	0	0	3	6	15	−9	3	Quarterfinals
5	Switzerland	4	0	0	0	4	1	14	−13	0	Quarterfinals

Source: IIHF
Rules for classification: 1) points; 2) head-to-head points; 3) head-to-head goal difference; 4) head-to-head number of goals scored; 5) result against closest best-ranked team outside tied teams; 6) result against second-best ranked team outside tied teams; 7) seeding before tournament.
(H) Host

9 April 2025; 15:00	Finland	1–7 (0–3, 1–2, 0–2)	United States	Budvar Arena, České Budějovice; Attendance: 5,132

Game reference

Sanni Ahola
Goalies
Aerin Frankel
Referees:
(United States) Kelly Cooke
(Finland) Anniina Nurmi
Linesmen:
(United States) Jennifer Cameron
(Czech Republic) Kristýna Hájková

	0–1	02:44 – Scamurra (Harmon, Simms)
	0–2	05:39 – Scamurra (Edwards, Zumwinkle)
	0–3	11:58 – Pannek (Murphy)
	0–4	20:55 – Stecklein (Knight, Heise)
Nieminen (Holopainen, Laitinen) (PP) – 28:03	1–4
	1–5	28:19 – Knight (Carpenter, Janecke)
	1–6	41:45 – Heise (Barnes)
	1–7	42:07 – Pannek (Winn, Harvey)

2 min
Penalties
4 min
20
Shots
24

9 April 2025; 19:00	Czechia	3–0 (2–0, 1–0, 0–0)	Switzerland	Budvar Arena, České Budějovice; Attendance: 5,859

Game reference

Klára Peslarová
Goalies
Andrea Brändli
Referees:
(Austria) Julia Kainberger
(Canada) Cianna Lieffers
Linesmen:
(Sweden) Jessica Lundgren
(Canada) Kirsten Welsh

Hymlárová (Mlýnková, Trnková) – 04:47	1–0
Kaltounková (Mrázová, Šapovalivová) (PP) – 19:47	2–0
Pištěková (Přibylová, Trnková) – 27:41	3–0

12 min
Penalties
6 min
31
Shots
26

10 April 2025; 19:00	Canada	5–0 (3–0, 1–0, 1–0)	Finland	Budvar Arena, České Budějovice; Attendance: 1,128

Game reference

Kristen Campbell
Goalies
Emilia Kyrkkö
Anni Keisala
Referees:
(Canada) Elizabeth Mantha
(United States) Amanda Tassoni
Linesmen:
(Canada) Alex Clarke
(Canada) Erin Zach

Gardiner (Shelton, Poulin) – 06:02	1–0
Shelton (Fast, Jenner) – 12:22	2–0
Poulin (Gardiner, Stacey) – 17:12	3–0
Gardiner – 20:18	4–0
Maltais (Zandee-Hart) – 51:14	5–0

4 min
Penalties
2 min
35
Shots
24

11 April 2025; 15:00	Switzerland	0–4 (0–1, 0–3, 0–0)	Canada	Budvar Arena, České Budějovice; Attendance: 5,398

Game reference

Andrea Brändli
Goalies
Ann-Renée Desbiens
Referees:
(Canada) Shauna Neary
(Finland) Anniina Nurmi
Linesmen:
(Czech Republic) Kristýna Hájková
(Canada) Justine Todd

0–1	12:26 – Zandee-Hart (Poulin, Stacey)
0–2	27:14 – Spooner (Poulin, Nurse) (PP)
0–3	29:06 – Stacey (Poulin, Fast)
0–4	29:46 – Watts (Fast, Fillier)

2 min
Penalties
2 min
17
Shots
40

11 April 2025; 19:00	United States	4–0 (1–0, 1–0, 2–0)	Czechia	Budvar Arena, České Budějovice; Attendance: 5,859

Game reference

Gwyneth Philips
Goalies
Michaela Hesová
Referees:
(Canada) Cianna Lieffers
(United States) Amanda Tassoni
Linesmen:
(Sweden) Jessica Lundgren
(Finland) Tiina Saarimäki

Murphy (Harvey, Simms) – 14:52	1–0
Murphy (Pannek, Keller) – 26:58	2–0
Knight (Keller, Carpenter) (PP) – 42:28	3–0
Carpenter (Keller, Janecke) (PP) – 47:22	4–0

4 min
Penalties
10 min
48
Shots
10

12 April 2025; 19:00	Finland	4–2 (0–1, 2–0, 2–1)	Czechia	Budvar Arena, České Budějovice; Attendance: 5,859

Game reference

Sanni Ahola
Goalies
Klára Peslarová
Referees:
(United States) Melissa Doyle
(Austria) Julia Kainberger
Linesmen:
(United States) Jennifer Cameron
(Canada) Erin Zach

	0–1	11:55 – Vanišová (Pejšová, Křížová) (PP)
Suoranta (Tulus, Kuoppala) – 26:29	1–1
Savolainen (Kuoppala, Tulus) – 29:23	2–1
Schalin (Savolainen, Vesa) – 46:20	3–1
Holopainen (Tapani, Nieminen) – 51:01	4–1
	4–2	57:57 – Kaltounková (Tejralová, Mrázová) (PP) (EA)

6 min
Penalties
2 min
28
Shots
29

13 April 2025; 19:00	Canada	1–2 (0–1, 0–1, 1–0)	United States	Budvar Arena, České Budějovice; Attendance: 5,538

Game reference

Ann-Renée Desbiens
Goalies
Aerin Frankel
Referees:
(United States) Samantha Hiller
(Canada) Michelle McKenna
Linesmen:
(Canada) Justine Todd
(Canada) Kirsten Welsh

	0–1	10:36 – Stecklein (Pannek, Coyne)
	0–2	32:22 – Keller (Scamurra, Harmon)
Stacey (Poulin, Gardiner) – 46:50	1–2

4 min
Penalties
4 min
19
Shots
28

14 April 2025; 15:00	Switzerland	1–2 (0–1, 1–1, 0–0)	Finland	Budvar Arena, České Budějovice; Attendance: 5,209

Game reference

Saskia Maurer
Goalies
Emilia Kyrkkö
Referees:
(Canada) Elizabeth Mantha
(Canada) Shauna Neary
Linesmen:
(Germany) Leonie Ernst
(Czech Republic) Kristýna Hájková

	0–1	10:13 – Savolainen (Nylund) (SH)
	0–2	27:47 – Karvinen (Tulus, Parkkonen)
Müller – 29:33	1–2

2 min
Penalties
8 min
28
Shots
22

14 April 2025; 19:00	Czechia	1–7 (1–1, 0–1, 0–5)	Canada	Budvar Arena, České Budějovice; Attendance: 5,859

Game reference

Klára Peslarová
Michaela Hesová
Goalies
Kristen Campbell
Referees:
(United States) Kelly Cooke
(Finland) Anniina Nurmi
Linesmen:
(Finland) Tiina Saarimäki
(Canada) Erin Zach

	0–1	03:20 – Poulin (Larocque, Ambrose)
Šapovalivová – 05:25	1–1
	1–2	27:13 – Poulin (Stacey, Larocque)
	1–3	45:42 – Watts (Ambrose, Thompson) (PP)
	1–4	46:09 – O'Neill (Gosling)
	1–5	46:40 – Gardiner
	1–6	48:05 – O'Neill (Maltais, Serdachny)
	1–7	54:17 – Jaques (Nurse, Fast)

8 min
Penalties
10 min
19
Shots
43

15 April 2025; 19:00	United States	5–0 (3–0, 1–0, 1–0)	Switzerland	Budvar Arena, České Budějovice; Attendance: 2,981

Game reference

Gwyneth Philips
Ava McNaughton
Goalies
Andrea Brändli
Referees:
(Sweden) Ida Henriksson
(Canada) Michelle McKenna
Linesmen:
(United States) Jennifer Cameron
(Germany) Leonie Ernst

Janecke (Carpenter, Knight) (PP) – 11:23	1–0
Coyne (Pannek, Winn) – 12:37	2–0
Janecke (Knight, Carpenter) – 15:05	3–0
Harvey (Knight, Carpenter) – 39:59	4–0
Coyne (Pannek, Wilgren) – 58:41	5–0

0 min
Penalties
6 min
53
Shots
6

=== Group B ===
Pos	Team	Pld	W	OTW	OTL	L	GF	GA	GD	Pts	Qualification or relegation
1	Sweden	4	4	0	0	0	17	2	+15	12	Quarterfinals
2	Japan	4	3	0	0	1	8	4	+4	9	Quarterfinals
3	Germany	4	2	0	0	2	11	9	+2	6	Quarterfinals
4	Norway	4	1	0	0	3	7	18	−11	3	Relegated to the 2026 Division I
5	Hungary	4	0	0	0	4	1	11	−10	0	Relegated to the 2026 Division I

Source: IIHF
Rules for classification: 1) points; 2) head-to-head points; 3) head-to-head goal difference; 4) head-to-head number of goals scored; 5) result against closest best-ranked team outside tied teams; 6) result against second-best ranked team outside tied teams; 7) seeding before tournament.

9 April 2025; 11:00	Sweden	5–2 (1–0, 1–1, 3–1)	Germany	Budvar Arena, České Budějovice; Attendance: 4,207

Game reference

Emma Söderberg
Goalies
Sandra Abstreiter
Referees:
(United States) Samantha Hiller
(Czech Republic) Zuzana Svobodová
Linesmen:
(France) Alexia Cheyroux
(Finland) Tiina Saarimäki

Thuvik (Lis. Johansson) – 10:34	1–0
Hallin (Olsson, Lin. Johansson) – 28:19	2–0
	2–1	33:16 – Lu. Welcke (Jobst-Smith, Li. Welcke)
Kjellbin (Lin. Johansson, Hallin) – 42:12	3–1
T. Johansson (Hedqvist, Bouveng) – 43:08	4–1
	4–2	50:04 – Nix (Kluge, Gleißner) (PP)
Olsson (EN) – 58:53	5–2

4 min
Penalties
4 min
33
Shots
19

10 April 2025; 11:00	Japan	5–2 (2–2, 2–0, 1–0)	Norway	Budvar Arena, České Budějovice; Attendance: 3,314

Game reference

Miyuu Masuhara
Goalies
Ena Nystrøm
Referees:
(Sweden) Ida Henriksson
(Canada) Shauna Neary
Linesmen:
(United States) Sarah Buckner
(Canada) Laura Gutauskas

	0–1	02:05 – Dalen
Hosoyamada (Miura, Maeda) – 04:51	1–1
Ukita (Ito, Sato) – 13:38	2–1
	2–2	15:53 – Brunvold (Haave)
Miura (Maeda) – 24:40	3–2
Rir. Noro (Maeda) – 36:01	4–2
Ak. Shiga (Ito) – 48:05	5–2

2 min
Penalties
12 min
57
Shots
27

10 April 2025; 15:00	Sweden	2–0 (0–0, 1–0, 1–0)	Hungary	Budvar Arena, České Budějovice; Attendance: 1,295

Game reference
Emma Söderberg	Goalies	Anikó Németh	Referees: (United States) Melissa Doyle (Canada) Michelle McKenna; Linesmen: (Germany) Leonie Ernst (Canada) Justine Todd
Lin. Johansson (Svensson, Forsgren) – 38:59 / 1–0; Ljungblom (Jungåker, Lin. Johansson) – 55:37 / 2–0			Referees: (United States) Melissa Doyle (Canada) Michelle McKenna; Linesmen: (Germany) Leonie Ernst (Canada) Justine Todd
8 min	Penalties	4 min	Referees: (United States) Melissa Doyle (Canada) Michelle McKenna; Linesmen: (Germany) Leonie Ernst (Canada) Justine Todd
24	Shots	24	Referees: (United States) Melissa Doyle (Canada) Michelle McKenna; Linesmen: (Germany) Leonie Ernst (Canada) Justine Todd

11 April 2025; 11:00	Hungary	0–2 (0–1, 0–0, 0–1)	Japan	Budvar Arena, České Budějovice; Attendance: 2,139

Game reference
Anikó Németh	Goalies	Miyuu Masuhara	Referees: (Canada) Michelle McKenna (Czech Republic) Zuzana Svobodová; Linesmen: (Canada) Laura Gutauskas (Canada) Kirsten Welsh
0–1 / 19:37 – Wajima; 0–2 / 59:52 – Ak. Shiga (Hitosato) (EN)			Referees: (Canada) Michelle McKenna (Czech Republic) Zuzana Svobodová; Linesmen: (Canada) Laura Gutauskas (Canada) Kirsten Welsh
4 min	Penalties	2 min	Referees: (Canada) Michelle McKenna (Czech Republic) Zuzana Svobodová; Linesmen: (Canada) Laura Gutauskas (Canada) Kirsten Welsh
27	Shots	21	Referees: (Canada) Michelle McKenna (Czech Republic) Zuzana Svobodová; Linesmen: (Canada) Laura Gutauskas (Canada) Kirsten Welsh

12 April 2025; 15:00	Norway	2–5 (1–2, 1–2, 0–1)	Germany	Budvar Arena, České Budějovice; Attendance: 5,435

Game reference

Ena Nystrøm
Goalies
Sandra Abstreiter
Referees:
(United States) Kelly Cooke
(United States) Samantha Hiller
Linesmen:
(United States) Sarah Buckner
(France) Alexia Cheyroux

	0–1	07:29 – Haider (Schiefer, Gleißner)
	0–2	17:47 – Feldmeier
Fischer (Kruse, Sirum) – 18:57	1–2
	1–3	22:01 – Schiefer (Feldmeier, Strobel)
Dalen (Fischer, Bergesen) – 31:24	2–3
	2–4	39:44 – Jobst-Smith (Lu. Welcke, Li. Welcke) (PP)
	2–5	59:18 – Li. Welcke (Lu. Welcke, Strobel) (SH, EN)

10 min
Penalties
6 min
22
Shots
39

13 April 2025; 11:00	Hungary	0–3 (0–0, 0–2, 0–1)	Norway	Budvar Arena, České Budějovice; Attendance: 1,811

Game reference

Anikó Németh
Goalies
Ena Nystrøm
Referees:
(Sweden) Ida Henriksson
(Canada) Elizabeth Mantha
Linesmen:
(Canada) Alex Clarke
(Germany) Leonie Ernst

0–1	20:56 – Furulund (Sirum)
0–2	29:46 – Bergesen (Engmann, Pedersen)
0–3	59:15 – Sirum (EN)

4 min
Penalties
6 min
45
Shots
21

13 April 2025; 15:00	Japan	0–2 (0–1, 0–0, 0–1)	Sweden	Budvar Arena, České Budějovice; Attendance: 3,051

Game reference
Miyuu Masuhara	Goalies	Emma Söderberg	Referees: (Austria) Julia Kainberger (Canada) Cianna Lieffers; Linesmen: (France) Alexia Cheyroux (Canada) Laura Gutauskas
0–1 / 16:57 – Bergström (Karlsson, Svensson); 0–2 / 44:33 – Thuvik (Hjalmarsson, L. Johansson)			Referees: (Austria) Julia Kainberger (Canada) Cianna Lieffers; Linesmen: (France) Alexia Cheyroux (Canada) Laura Gutauskas
0 min	Penalties	4 min	Referees: (Austria) Julia Kainberger (Canada) Cianna Lieffers; Linesmen: (France) Alexia Cheyroux (Canada) Laura Gutauskas
17	Shots	26	Referees: (Austria) Julia Kainberger (Canada) Cianna Lieffers; Linesmen: (France) Alexia Cheyroux (Canada) Laura Gutauskas

14 April 2025; 11:00	Germany	4–1 (0–0, 1–1, 3–0)	Hungary	Budvar Arena, České Budějovice; Attendance: 3,415

Game reference

Sandra Abstreiter
Goalies
Anikó Németh
Referees:
(Czech Republic) Zuzana Svobodová
(United States) Amanda Tassoni
Linesmen:
(United States) Jennifer Cameron
(Sweden) Jessica Lundgren

Hadraschek (Nix, Kluge) (PP) – 33:16	1–0
	1–1	36:16 – Kreisz (Seregély, Mayer)
Jobst-Smith (Li. Welcke, Voigt) (PP) – 45:38	2–1
Kluge (Voigt) (PP) – 49:00	3–1
Hadraschek (Kluge, Nix) (PP) – 58:01	4–1

8 min
Penalties
8 min
23
Shots
13

15 April 2025; 11:00	Norway	0–8 (0–2, 0–3, 0–3)	Sweden	Budvar Arena, České Budějovice; Attendance: 5,217

Game reference

Ena Nystrøm
Goalies
Ida Boman
Referees:
(United States) Melissa Doyle
(Canada) Shauna Neary
Linesmen:
(France) Alexia Cheyroux
(Canada) Alex Clarke

0–1	06:44 – Hallin (Johansson, Karlsson)
0–2	14:24 – Ljungblom (Johansson, Raunio)
0–3	20:18 – Hedqvist (Hjalmarsson)
0–4	25:10 – Raunio (Svensson)
0–5	31:39 – Bouveng (Hjalmarsson, Kjellbin)
0–6	46:26 – Hedqvist (Silén, Bouveng)
0–7	52:51 – Svensson (Ljungblom, Jungåker)
0–8	57:44 – Hedqvist (Silén, Hjalmarsson)

2 min
Penalties
0 min
16
Shots
56

15 April 2025; 15:00	Germany	0–1 (0–0, 0–1, 0–0)	Japan	Budvar Arena, České Budějovice; Attendance: 1,703

Game reference
Sandra Abstreiter	Goalies	Miyuu Masuhara	Referees: (United States) Kelly Cooke (Czech Republic) Zuzana Svobodová; Linesmen: (United States) Sarah Buckner (Sweden) Jessica Lundgren
0–1 / 25:11 – Ukita (Ito)			Referees: (United States) Kelly Cooke (Czech Republic) Zuzana Svobodová; Linesmen: (United States) Sarah Buckner (Sweden) Jessica Lundgren
4 min	Penalties	0 min	Referees: (United States) Kelly Cooke (Czech Republic) Zuzana Svobodová; Linesmen: (United States) Sarah Buckner (Sweden) Jessica Lundgren
34	Shots	25	Referees: (United States) Kelly Cooke (Czech Republic) Zuzana Svobodová; Linesmen: (United States) Sarah Buckner (Sweden) Jessica Lundgren

== Knockout stage ==
There was a re-seeding after the quarterfinals.

=== Bracket ===
Quarterfinals
17 April
A1 United States	3
B3 Germany	0
17 April
A2 Canada	9
B2 Japan	1
17 April
A3 Finland	3
B1 Sweden	2
17 April
A4 Czechia	7
A5 Switzerland	0

Semifinals
19 April
1 United States	2
4 Czechia	1
19 April
2 Canada	8
3 Finland	1

Final
20 April
1 United States (OT)	4
2 Canada	3
Third place
20 April
3 Finland (OT)	4
4 Czechia	3

=== Quarterfinals ===
17 April 2025; 10:00	Finland	3–2 (2–0, 1–2, 0–0)	Sweden	Budvar Arena, České Budějovice; Attendance: 2,594

Game reference

Sanni Ahola
Goalies
Emma Söderberg
Referees:
(United States) Melissa Doyle
(United States) Amanda Tassoni
Linesmen:
(Canada) Laura Gutauskas
(Czech Republic) Kristýna Hájková

Nylund (Liikala, Vanhanen) – 08:35	1–0
Savolainen (Suoranta, Liikala) – 17:15	2–0
	2–1	20:50 – Hedqvist (Hjalmarsson, Söderberg)
	2–2	25:54 – Bouveng (Raunio, Jungåker)
Tapani (Holopainen) – 31:46	3–2

0 min
Penalties
4 min
26
Shots
15

17 April 2025; 13:30	United States	3–0 (2–0, 1–0, 0–0)	Germany	Budvar Arena, České Budějovice; Attendance: 2,958

Game reference

Aerin Frankel
Goalies
Sandra Abstreiter
Referees:
(Canada) Michelle McKenna
(Finland) Anniina Nurmi
Linesmen:
(United States) Jennifer Cameron
(Canada) Erin Zach

Pannek (Murphy, Edwards) – 05:36	1–0
Eden (Winn, Heise) – 10:50	2–0
Carpenter (Knight, Janecke) – 38:53	3–0

2 min
Penalties
10 min
51
Shots
12

17 April 2025; 17:00	Czechia	7–0 (5–0, 0–0, 2–0)	Switzerland	Budvar Arena, České Budějovice; Attendance: 5,859

Game reference

Klára Peslarová
Goalies
Andrea Brändli
Saskia Maurer
Referees:
(United States) Samantha Hiller
(Canada) Elizabeth Mantha
Linesmen:
(Canada) Alex Clarke
(Sweden) Jessica Lundgren

Pejšová (Vanišová, Pejzlová) – 11:47	1–0
Mlýnková (Kaltounková, Tejralová) (PP) – 13:15	2–0
Vanišová (Křížová, Pejšová) – 13:40	3–0
Kaltounková (Mrázová, Šapovalivová) – 18:13	4–0
Křížová (Vanišová, Seroiszková) – 19:48	5–0
Mlýnková (Mrázová, Kaltounková) (PP) – 48:15	6–0
Mlýnková (SH) – 53:41	7–0

8 min
Penalties
6 min
22
Shots
14

17 April 2025; 20:30	Canada	9–1 (2–0, 3–1, 4–0)	Japan	Budvar Arena, České Budějovice; Attendance: 4,877

Game reference

Kristen Campbell
Goalies
Miyuu Masuhara
Referees:
(Austria) Julia Kainberger
(Canada) Shauna Neary
Linesmen:
(United States) Sarah Buckner
(Finland) Tiina Saarimäki

Thompson (Fast, Clark) – 13:42	1–0
Gardiner (Thompson) – 16:38	2–0
	2–1	30:00 – Miura
Shelton (Watts) – 31:30	3–1
Fillier (Spooner, Fast) – 33:56	4–1
Gosling (Poulin, Fast) (PP) – 34:44	5–1
Gardiner (O'Neill) – 42:52	6–1
Fillier (Larocque) – 52:22	7–1
Clark (Turnbull) – 53:10	8–1
Jaques (O'Neill, Thompson) – 59:01	9–1

2 min
Penalties
2 min
62
Shots
6

=== Semifinals ===
19 April 2025; 15:00	United States	2–1 (0–1, 1–0, 1–0)	Czechia	Budvar Arena, České Budějovice; Attendance: 5,859

Game reference

Aerin Frankel
Goalies
Klára Peslarová
Referees:
(United States) Kelly Cooke
(Canada) Cianna Lieffers
Linesmen:
(Canada) Justine Todd
(Canada) Kirsten Welsh

	0–1	15:28 – Plosová (Hymlárová)
Edwards (Keller, Knight) (PP) – 28:56	1–1
Pannek (Eden, Dunne) – 48:26	2–1

2 min
Penalties
6 min
45
Shots
11

19 April 2025; 19:00	Canada	8–1 (2–1, 4–0, 2–0)	Finland	Budvar Arena, České Budějovice; Attendance: 5,273

Game reference

Ann-Renée Desbiens
Goalies
Emilia Kyrkkö
Referees:
(United States) Samantha Hiller
(United States) Amanda Tassoni
Linesmen:
(Czech Republic) Kristýna Hájková
(Canada) Erin Zach

	0–1	00:46 – Karvinen (Tulus, Savolainen)
Ambrose (Gardiner, Stacey) – 02:28	1–1
Poulin (Gardiner, Stacey) – 14:44	2–1
Watts (Nurse, Thompson) – 37:18	3–1
Watts (Fast, Poulin) (PP) – 38:17	4–1
Clark (Jenner, Thompson) (PP) – 38:30	5–1
Serdachny (Gosling, O'Neill) – 39:16	6–1
Thompson (Maltais) (SH) – 44:56	7–1
Nurse (Serdachny, Shelton) – 51:25	8–1

29 min
Penalties
2 min
34
Shots
20

=== Fifth place game ===
19 April 2025; 11:00	Switzerland	3–2 (1–1, 2–1, 0–0)	Sweden	Budvar Arena, České Budějovice; Attendance: 3,274

Game reference

Saskia Maurer
Goalies
Emma Söderberg
Referees:
(Austria) Julia Kainberger
(Canada) Elizabeth Mantha
Linesmen:
(Canada) Alex Clarke
(Finland) Tina Saarimäki

	0–1	15:36 – Hedqvist (Bouveng, Kjellbin)
Enzler (Stalder, Vallario) (PP) – 17:45	1–1
	1–2	29:43 – Johansson (Olsson, Jungåker) (PP)
Stalder (Enzler, Müller) – 35:15	2–2
Enzler (Müller, Mériguet) – 39:57	3–2

6 min
Penalties
4 min
23
Shots
36

=== Third place game ===
20 April 2025; 14:00	Finland	4–3 OT (0–2, 1–1, 2–0) (OT: 1–0)	Czechia	Budvar Arena, České Budějovice; Attendance: 5,859

Game reference

Sanni Ahola
Goalies
Klára Peslarová
Referees:
(United States) Samantha Hiller
(Austria) Julia Kainberger
Linesmen:
(Canada) Erin Zach
(Canada) Alex Clarke

	0–1	02:48 – Kaltounková (Pejšová, Mlýnková)
	0–2	12:53 – Mlýnková (Mrázová, Tejralová) (PP)
	0–3	30:42 – Lásková (Čajanová, Juříčková)
Suoranta (Vanhanen) – 36:26	1–3
Holopainen (Nieminen, Laitinen) (PP) – 41:06	2–3
Holopainen (Savolainen, Laitinen) (PP, EA) – 58:27	3–3
Nylund (Vanhanen) – 64:52	4–3

5 min
Penalties
10 min
29
Shots
28

=== Final ===
20 April 2025; 18:00	United States	4–3 OT (0–0, 2–2, 1–1) (OT: 1–0)	Canada	Budvar Arena, České Budějovice; Attendance: 5,369

Game reference

Aerin Frankel
Goalies
Ann-Renée Desbiens
Referees:
(United States) Kelly Cooke
(Canada) Cianna Lieffers
Linesmen:
(Canada) Justine Todd
(Canada) Kirsten Welsh

Harvey (Knight, Carpenter) – 27:16	1–0
Murphy (Coyne, Stecklein) – 27:45	2–0
	2–1	28:37 – Serdachny (Fast, Clark)
	2–2	29:32 – Gardiner (Poulin, Stacey)
Heise (Murphy, Edwards) (PP2) – 45:27	3–2
	3–3	54:12 – Fillier (Clark)
Janecke (Heise) – 77:06	4–3

4 min
Penalties
6 min
30
Shots
47

== Final standings ==
Pos	Grp	Team	Pld	W	OTW	OTL	L	GF	GA	GD	Pts	Final Result
1	A	United States	7	6	1	0	0	27	6	+21	20	Champions
2	A	Canada	7	5	0	1	1	37	9	+28	16	Runners-up
3	A	Finland	7	3	1	0	3	15	28	−13	11	Third place
4	A	Czechia (H)	7	2	0	1	4	17	21	−4	7	Fourth place
5	A	Switzerland	6	1	0	0	5	4	23	−19	3	Fifth place
6	B	Sweden	6	4	0	0	2	21	8	+13	12	Sixth place
7	B	Japan	5	3	0	0	2	9	13	−4	9	
8	B	Germany	5	2	0	0	3	11	12	−1	6	
9	B	Norway	4	1	0	0	3	7	18	−11	3	Relegated to the 2026 Division I A
10	B	Hungary	4	0	0	0	4	1	11	−10	0	Relegated to the 2026 Division I A

Source: IIHF
(H) Host

== Awards and statistics ==
The awards were announced on 20 April 2025.

=== Awards ===
Directorate Awards

Position	Player
Goaltender	(United States) Aerin Frankel
Defenceman	(United States) Caroline Harvey
Forward	(Canada) Marie-Philip Poulin
MVP	(Canada) Marie-Philip Poulin

All-Star team

Position	Player
Goaltender	(Czech Republic) Klára Peslarová
Defenceman	(Canada) Renata Fast
Defenceman	(Finland) Ronja Savolainen
Forward	(Czech Republic) Kristýna Kaltounková
Forward	(United States) Kelly Pannek
Forward	(Canada) Marie-Philip Poulin

=== Scoring leaders ===
List shows the top skaters sorted by points, then goals.

Player	GP	G	A	PTS	+/−	PIM	Pos
(Canada) Marie-Philip Poulin	7	4	8	12	+9	2	F
(Canada) Jennifer Gardiner	7	6	4	10	+13	0	F
(United States) Hilary Knight	7	2	7	9	+3	0	F
(United States) Kelly Pannek	7	4	4	8	+8	0	F
(United States) Alex Carpenter	7	2	6	8	+2	0	F
(Canada) Laura Stacey	7	2	6	8	+8	4	F
(Canada) Renata Fast	7	0	8	8	+11	4	D
(Sweden) Linnéa Johansson	6	2	5	7	+8	2	F
(Canada) Claire Thompson	6	2	5	7	+7	4	D
(Sweden) Ebba Hedqvist	6	5	1	6	+6	2	F

GP = Games Played, G = Goals, A = Assists, PTS = Points, +/- = Plus/Minus, PIM = Penalties in Minutes, Pos = Position
Source: IIHF

=== Leading goaltenders ===
Only the top five goaltenders, based on save percentage, who have played at least 40% of their team's minutes, are included in this list.

Player	TOI	GA	GAA	SA	Sv%	SO
(Canada) Kristen Campbell	180:00	2	0.67	49	95.92	1
(United States) Aerin Frankel	284:35	5	1.05	91	94.51	1
(Sweden) Emma Söderberg	297:16	8	1.61	109	92.66	2
(Canada) Ann-Renée Desbiens	256:31	7	1.64	95	92.63	1
(Japan) Miyuu Masuhara	298:03	13	2.62	176	92.61	2

TOI = Time on Ice, GA = Goals Against, GAA = Goals Against Average, SA = Shots Against, Sv% = Save Percentage, SO = Shutouts
Source: IIHF
