= Kelly Pannek =

American ice hockey player (born 1995)

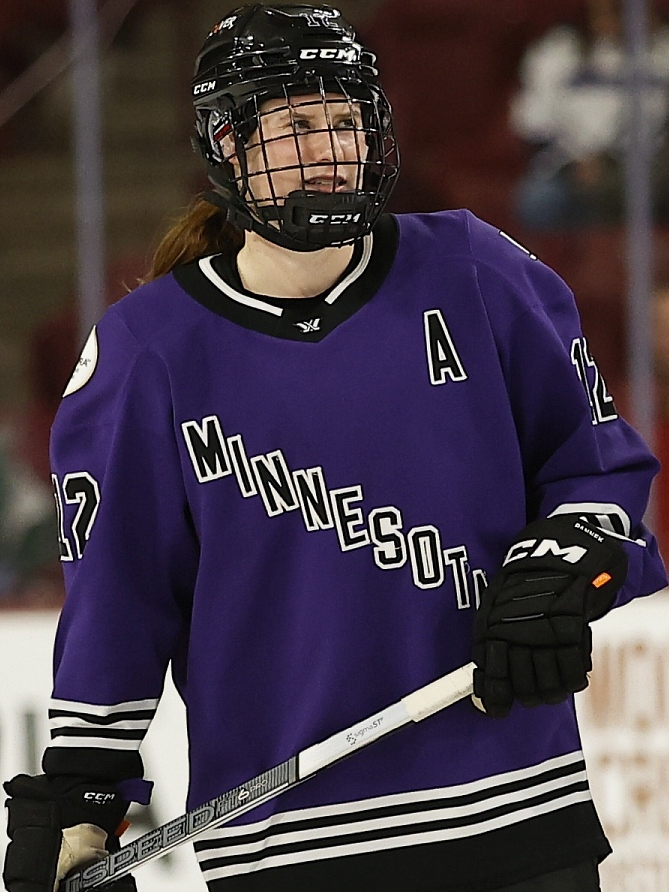
- Pannek with PWHL Minnesota in 2024
- Born: December 29, 1995 (age 30) Plymouth, Minnesota, United States
- Height: 5 ft 8 in (173 cm)
- Weight: 150 lb (68 kg; 10 st 10 lb)
- Position: Forward
- Shoots: Right
- PWHL team: Minnesota Frost
- National team: United States
- Playing career: 2014–present
Medal record
Olympic Games
Gold medal – first place	2018 Pyeongchang	Team
Gold medal – first place	2026 Milano Cortina	Team
Silver medal – second place	2022 Beijing	Team
World Championships
Gold medal – first place	2017 United States
Gold medal – first place	2019 Finland
Gold medal – first place	2023 Canada
Gold medal – first place	2025 Czechia
Gold medal – first place	2026 Denmark
Silver medal – second place	2021 Canada
Silver medal – second place	2022 Denmark
Silver medal – second place	2024 United States

Kelly Maureen Pannek (born December 29, 1995) is an American professional ice hockey player for the Minnesota Frost of the Professional Women's Hockey League (PWHL). She previously played in the Professional Women's Hockey Players Association (PWHPA). An alternate captain for Minnesota, Pannek has won back-to-back Walter Cup championships with the Frost in 2024 and 2025.

Internationally, Pannek has represented the United States since 2017, earning three Olympic medals—gold in 2018, silver in 2022, and gold in 2026—and seven World Championship medals, including four golds (2017, 2019, 2023, 2025). At the 2025 World Championship, she finished fourth in tournament scoring with eight points in seven games. In the 2018 Olympic gold medal game against Canada, Pannek delivered a crucial assist on the game-tying goal with 6:21 remaining that sent the game to overtime, where the United States won 3–2 in a shootout for their first Olympic gold in 20 years.

At the collegiate level, Pannek played for the University of Minnesota, recording 186 points in 157 games and winning two NCAA national championships (2015, 2016). She was a Patty Kazmaier Award finalist in 2017 after scoring 62 points in 39 games. In high school at Benilde-St. Margaret's, she was a dual-sport athlete who set a Minnesota state record for the fastest natural hat trick in hockey (three goals in 22 seconds) and was named 2013 Minnesota Ms. Soccer.

== Early life ==
Born in Plymouth, Minnesota to Molly and Todd Pannek, Kelly was raised with her two older sisters, Allie and Amy, and one younger brother, Billy in Plymouth. Pannek grew up playing multiple sports, crediting her multi-sport upbringing as essential to her athletic development. She played baseball, basketball, and spent time playing outdoor games with neighborhood kids. Pannek has cited this variety as essential to her success, stating: "I grew up in a time where you're always playing outside, playing whatever games with the neighborhood kids, playing a bunch of different sports...I think that's a huge reason why I am the athlete I am now."

Pannek attended Benilde-St. Margaret's, a Catholic school in St. Louis Park, Minnesota, where she excelled in both hockey and soccer as a dual-sport varsity athlete for four years. In hockey, she led the Red Knights in scoring as a freshman with 52 points during the 2010–11 season. As a sophomore in 2012, Pannek set a Minnesota state record for the fastest natural hat trick, scoring three consecutive goals in 22 seconds. She was a four-time Star Tribune all-metro honoree, receiving first team honors in 2013 and 2014, and was a finalist for the Minnesota Ms. Hockey Award in 2014.

In soccer, Pannek was a six-time varsity letter winner who played midfielder and scored 99 points, including 41 goals, as a senior. She led the Red Knights to back-to-back Minnesota state soccer championships as a junior and senior (2012, 2013) and was named 2013 Minnesota Ms. Soccer. Despite being one of the best soccer players in Minnesota and receiving offers to play both Division I soccer and hockey at the University of Minnesota, Pannek chose to focus solely on hockey for college, explaining that she "always loved hockey practice" and was constantly working to improve at the sport. Pannek was a National Honor Society member and was named to the high honor roll.

== Playing career ==
=== Collegiate ===
Pannek played four seasons for the University of Minnesota between 2014 and 2019, recording 186 points (72 goals, 114 assists) in 157 games. She helped the Golden Gophers win back-to-back NCAA national championships in 2015 and 2016. As a freshman during the 2014–15 season, Pannek led all NCAA rookies with 44 points (14 goals, 30 assists) in 41 games, earning a spot on the All-USCHO Rookie Team and WCHA All-Rookie Team. She ranked eighth in the NCAA and third in the WCHA with 30 assists. In her sophomore season, Pannek recorded a career-high 49 points (23 goals, 26 assists) in 40 games and led the Gophers with six game-winning goals. She was named WCHA Offensive Player of the Month for October after leading the league with a .701 faceoff winning percentage and 10 goals during the month.

External videos
- Kelly Pannek's OT Goal Beats Wisconsin 4-3, Minnesota Gophers

Pannek's junior season in 2016–17 was her most decorated, as she recorded 62 points (19 goals, 43 assists) in 39 games and was named a First-Team All-American by the AHCA. She was a finalist for the Patty Kazmaier Award as the top player in women's college hockey, and the Gophers won their second consecutive national championship. Following the season, Pannek took a redshirt year in 2017–18 to train with the U.S. Women's National Team in preparation for the 2018 Winter Olympics, where she won a gold medal.

Pannek returned for her senior season in 2018–19 as team captain, recording 31 points (16 goals, 15 assists) in 37 games. She led the WCHA with two hat tricks and tied for first in the conference and fourth in the nation with three shorthanded goals. She finished her collegiate career ranked sixth all-time among Golden Gophers with 114 career assists and 10th with 186 career points.

=== Professional ===
==== Drafted by Minnesota Whitecaps (2018) ====
Pannek was drafted fourth overall by the Minnesota Whitecaps in the 2018 NWHL Draft on December 20, 2018, making her the Whitecaps' first-ever draft pick. She was one of three 2018 U.S. Olympic gold medalists selected in the first round of the draft, alongside Megan Keller (third overall to Buffalo) and Kali Flanagan (fifth overall to Boston). At the time of her selection, Pannek was in the middle of her senior season at Minnesota, where she had recorded 11 goals and eight assists in 18 games. However, Pannek never played for the Whitecaps and joined the Professional Women's Hockey Players Association (PWHPA) instead.

==== PWHPA (2019–2023) ====
After graduating from Minnesota in 2019, Pannek joined the Professional Women's Hockey Players Association (PWHPA), opting not to sign with the NWHL in pursuit of a sustainable professional league. The PWHPA was founded in May 2019 by over 200 players following the dissolution of the Canadian Women's Hockey League, with the goal of establishing a unified, financially sustainable professional women's hockey league in North America. PWHPA members boycotted existing leagues—including the NWHL—citing concerns over inadequate salaries, lack of health insurance, and insufficient financial stability.

External videos
- Making History at The Garden: PWHPA Secret Dream Gap Tour, New York Rangers

Pannek competed with the PWHPA's Minnesota regional hub during the Dream Gap Tour showcases from 2020 to 2023, a series of exhibition events designed to generate support for the establishment of a professional league while maintaining competitive play. During the 2020–21 PWHPA season, Pannek emerged as a leading scorer for Team Adidas (Minnesota). In 11 games during the Florida hub-city training, she led the team with six goals and 10 points. She continued as a key player throughout the PWHPA's existence, competing alongside teammates including Kendall Coyne Schofield, Hilary Knight, Hannah Brandt, and Lee Stecklein in showcases held in cities across North America. In the 2022–23 PWHPA season, Pannek played for Team Harvey's alongside players such as Marie-Philip Poulin and Alex Carpenter. The PWHPA's efforts culminated in 2022 when the organization partnered with Mark Walter and Billie Jean King, leading to the formation of the Professional Women's Hockey League (PWHL) in 2023.

==== Minnesota Frost (2023–present) ====
===== 2023–24 season =====
On September 20, 2023, the newly formed PWHL announced that Pannek, along with Kendall Coyne Schofield and Lee Stecklein, had signed three-year contracts with the Minnesota franchise, making them the team's first three signings in PWHL history. Minnesota general manager Natalie Darwitz stated: "With the signing of three of the top players in the world, Minnesota cements its foundation as a team built on excellence." Pannek was named one of the team's alternate captains.

External videos
- Best Of Kelly Pannek #12 2023-2024 Highlights, Minnesota Frost

During the inaugural PWHL season, Pannek recorded four goals and 12 assists in 19 regular season games. Minnesota finished the regular season in fourth place with an 8–4–3–9 record, clinching the final playoff spot on the last day of the season after losing their final five games. In the semifinals, top-seeded PWHL Toronto selected Minnesota as their opponent. After being shut out in the first two games of the series, Minnesota rallied to win three consecutive games, advancing to the 2024 PWHL Finals. In Game 3 of the finals against PWHL Boston at Xcel Energy Center, Pannek assisted on Sydney Brodt's first career PWHL goal, which gave Minnesota a 2–0 first-period lead en route to a 4–1 victory before more than 9,000 fans.

Minnesota clinched the inaugural Walter Cup championship with a 3–0 road victory over Boston in Game 5 on May 29, 2024. Pannek finished the playoffs with two goals and three assists in 10 games, contributing to Minnesota's championship run. Following the championship, Pannek praised captain Kendall Coyne Schofield's leadership, stating: "The only reason this [league] happened from a player's sense is Kendall."

===== 2024–25 season =====
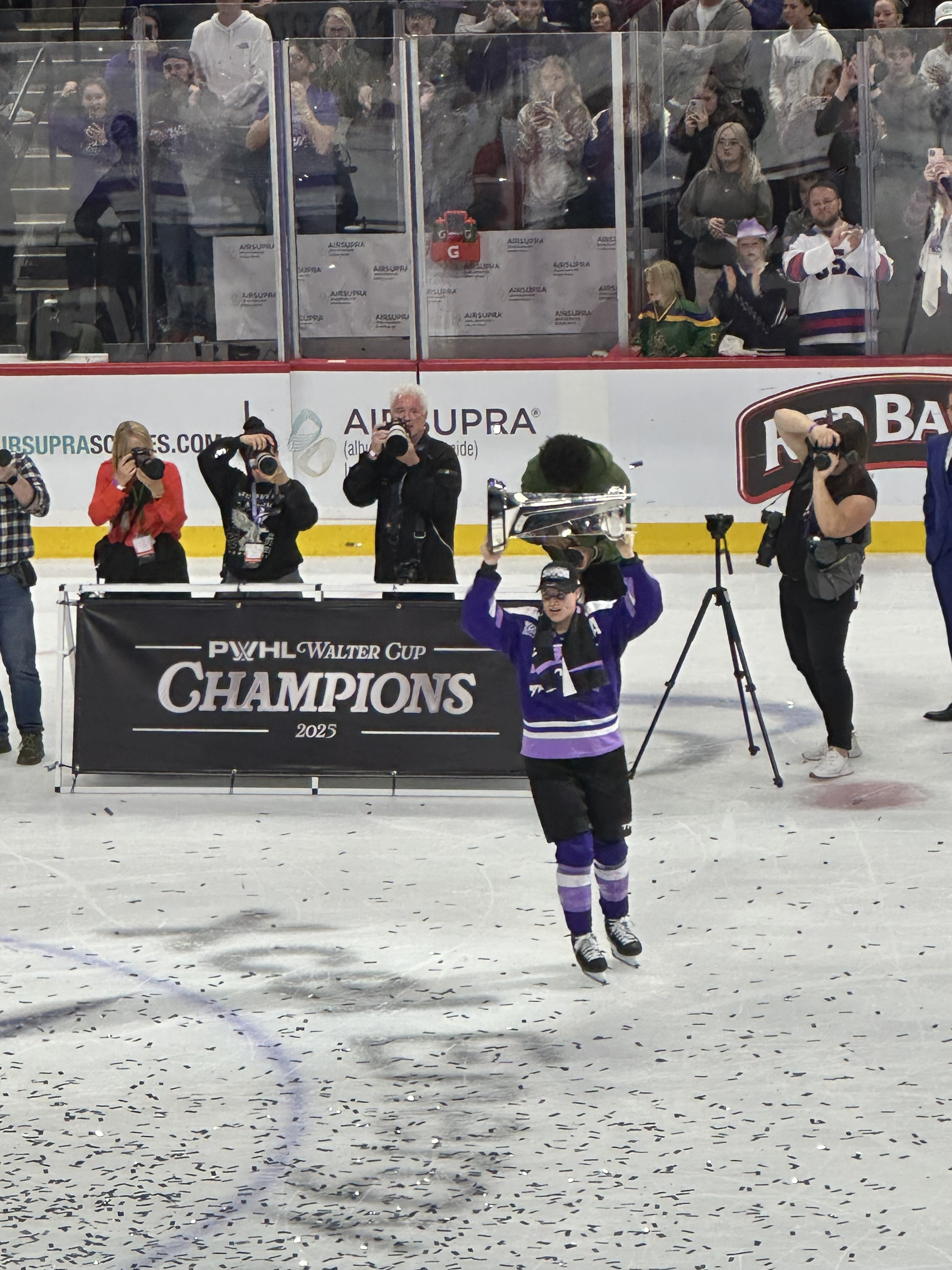
Pannek with the 2025 Walter Cup

In the Frost's championship defense season, Pannek recorded three goals and 11 assists in 30 regular season games. Minnesota again entered the playoffs as the fourth seed after clinching a playoff berth on the final day of the regular season. Prior to the playoffs, Pannek participated in the 2025 IIHF Women's World Championship in the Czech Republic, where she finished fourth in tournament scoring with four goals and four assists in seven games as the United States captured gold.

In the semifinals, Minnesota again rallied from a series deficit, defeating PWHL Toronto after losing Game 1. Minnesota advanced to face the Ottawa Charge in the 2025 PWHL Finals, where all four games were decided by 2–1 overtime results. After losing Game 1, the Frost won three consecutive games to capture their second consecutive Walter Cup championship.

Pannek scored the go-ahead goal in Game 4—the series clincher—midway through the second period, giving Minnesota their first lead of the entire series. It was also the Frost's first goal in the first period of the entire finals series. Liz Schepers scored the championship-winning goal in overtime for the second consecutive year before a crowd of 11,024 at Xcel Energy Center. Pannek finished the playoffs with two goals and five assists in eight games, becoming the ninth Frost player to score multiple postseason goals. Following the championship, Pannek reflected on winning at home: "It's always fun to celebrate in Boston with just the people closest to you...It's also special to celebrate here with all the fans who stick with you through three overtimes."

===== 2025–26 season =====
Pannek entered her third PWHL season as one of the Frost's alternate captains, continuing her role on the team's top line with Kendall Coyne Schofield and Britta Curl-Salemme. She began the season in outstanding form, recording eight points (three goals, five assists) in her first six games, matching her goal total from the entire 2024–25 regular season and tying for the league lead in scoring. Pannek credited her offseason preparation for her strong start, noting: "Knowing that it's a long season, [I'm] trying to be ready for the PWHL season, and also trying to be in a good spot to make an Olympic team and then compete at the Olympics in February."

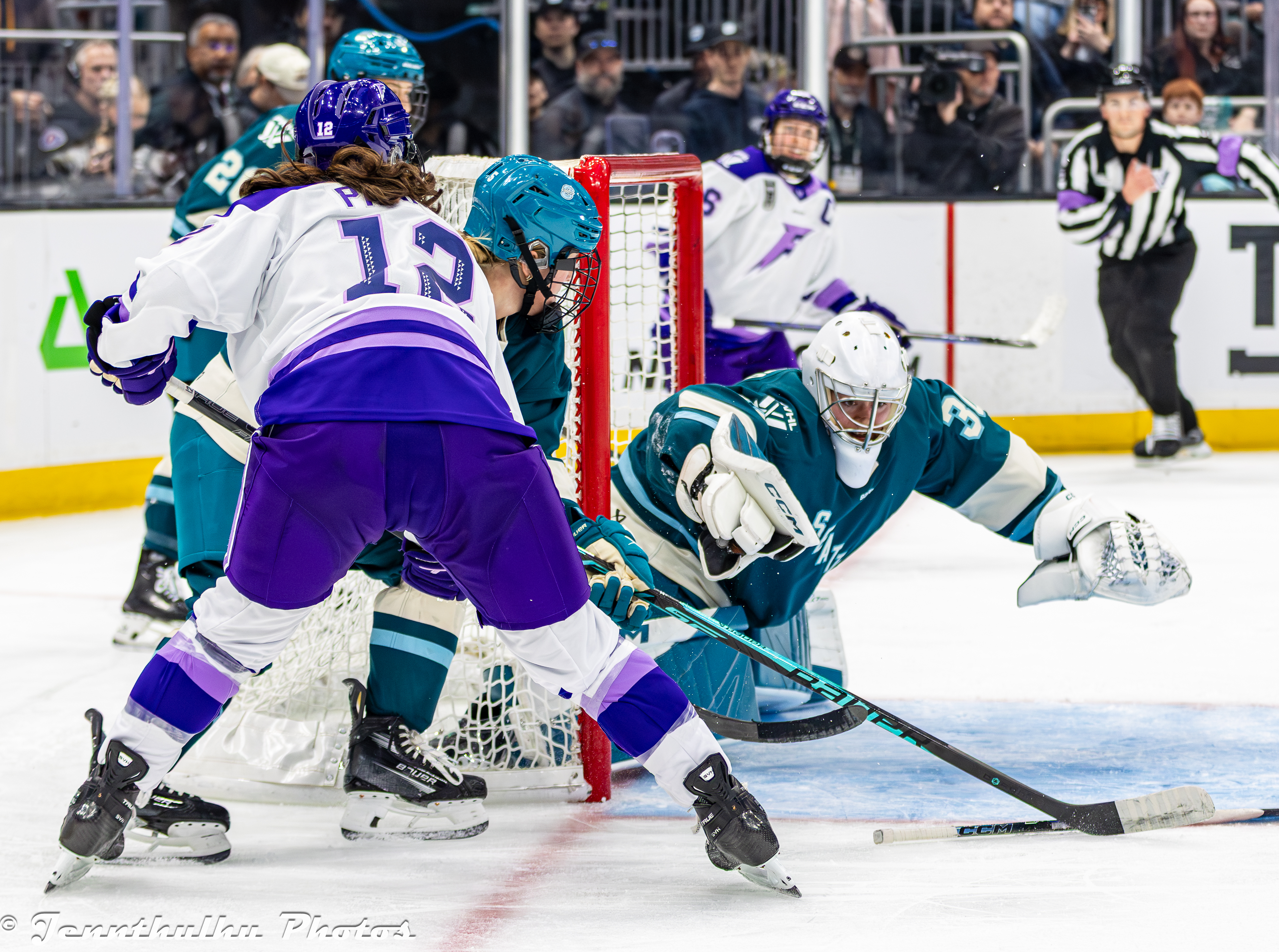
Pannek takes a shot against Seattle, November 2025

On November 28, 2025, Pannek scored two goals in a 3–0 shutout victory over the Seattle Torrent at Climate Pledge Arena, helping Minnesota spoil Seattle's home debut before a record-breaking U.S. arena crowd of 16,014 for a women's hockey game. It was her second career multi-goal game in the PWHL. On December 19, Pannek recorded an empty-net goal in a 5–2 victory over the Boston Fleet, matching her 2024–25 season goal total. Through the first seven games of the season, Pannek maintained a 4.77 points per 60 minutes of ice time, with six of her eight points coming at even strength. Her shot rate also increased dramatically from the previous season—she recorded 15 shots in six games (8.83 shots/60) compared to 51 shots in 30 games (5.5 shots/60) in 2024–25. Pannek also showcased strong playmaking, with four of her five assists being primary assists. Between PWHL games, Pannek competed in the 2025–26 Rivalry Series in November and December, scoring three goals and one assist in four games for Team USA, including a two-goal performance in the United States' historic 10–4 victory over Canada on December 11, 2025—the first time Canada had allowed 10 goals in a loss to the U.S. She ranked fifth in Rivalry Series scoring over the four-game stretch.

== International play ==
Pannek has represented the United States on the senior national team since 2017. As of 2025, she has earned two Olympic medals (one gold, one silver) and seven World Championship medals (four gold, three silver).

=== World Championships ===
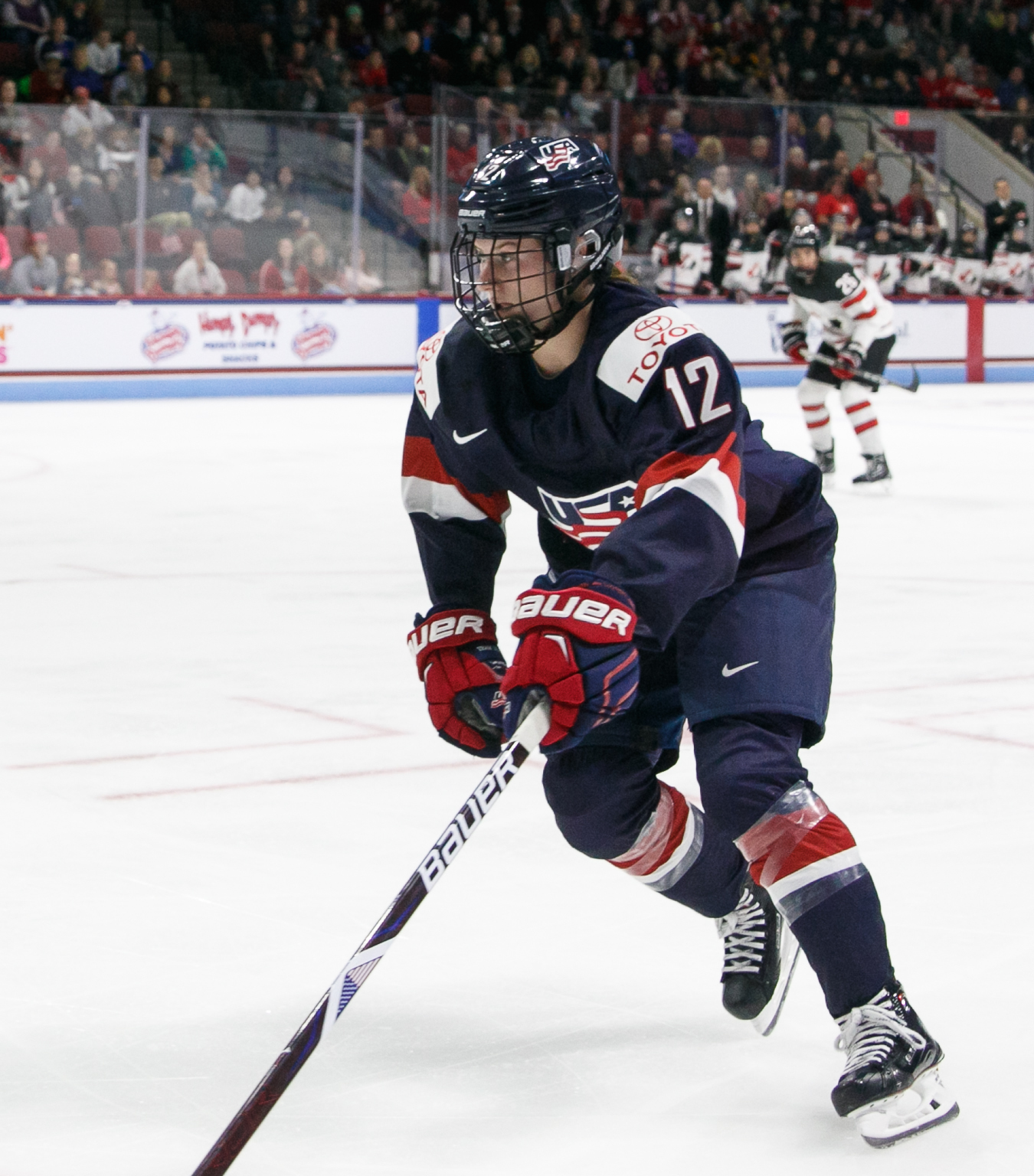
Team USA forward Kelly Pannek, 2017

Pannek was first invited to the senior team's development camp in December 2016. She made her IIHF Women's World Championship debut at the 2017 World Championship in Plymouth, Michigan, where the United States captured gold. Pannek continued to represent the United States at the 2018 and 2019 World Championships, earning gold medals at both tournaments.

At the 2022 World Championship, Pannek recorded three goals and one assist in seven games as Team USA won silver. At the 2023 World Championship in Brampton, Ontario, she recorded one assist in seven games as the United States captured gold. Pannek participated in the 2024 World Championship in Utica, New York, though she did not record any points in seven games; the United States earned silver. At the 2025 World Championship in České Budějovice, Czech Republic, Pannek finished fourth in tournament scoring with four goals and three assists in seven games as the United States captured gold.

=== Olympics ===
==== 2018 PyeongChang ====
Pannek was a member of the gold-medal-winning American team at the 2018 Winter Olympics in PyeongChang, where she recorded two assists in five games. Throughout the tournament, she played on the third line alongside twins Jocelyne Lamoureux-Davidson and Monique Lamoureux-Morando, and the trio's chemistry was exceptional throughout the competition.

In the gold medal game against Canada, Pannek delivered a crucial stretch pass to Monique Lamoureux-Morando, who was streaking up ice during a Canadian line change. Lamoureux-Morando scored on the breakaway with 6:21 remaining in the third period to tie the game 2–2, sending it to overtime. The United States went on to win 3–2 in a shootout, capturing their first Olympic gold medal in 20 years. Pannek also finished in the tournament's top 10 for faceoff percentage.

==== 2022 Beijing ====
On January 2, 2022, Pannek was named to Team USA's roster for the 2022 Winter Olympics in Beijing. During the preliminary round on February 6, Pannek recorded two goals and one assist in an 8–0 victory over Switzerland, earning three points. Throughout the entire competition, she recorded two goals and four assists in seven games as the United States earned a silver medal, losing 3–2 to Canada in the gold medal game.

==== 2026 Milan ====
On January 2, 2026, she was named to team USA's roster for the 2026 Winter Olympics.

==== Four Nations Cup ====
Pannek won gold with Team USA at the 2017 Four Nations Cup. Following the 2018 Olympics, she won gold at the 2018 Four Nations Cup.

==== Rivalry Series ====
Pannek has been a regular participant in the Rivalry Series between the United States and Canada since its inception in 2019. In the 2025–26 series, played in November and December 2025, Pannek recorded three goals and one assist in four games for Team USA, ranking fifth in series scoring. On December 11, 2025, during the third game in Edmonton, Alberta, Pannek recorded two goals in a historic 10–4 victory over Canada—the first time the Canadian women's national ice hockey team had allowed 10 goals in a loss to the United States.

== Personal life ==
Pannek graduated from the University of Minnesota with a bachelor's degree in finance, with a minor in supply chain management from the Carlson School of Management.

Outside of her playing career, Pannek has served as co-head coach for the Benilde-St. Margaret's girls hockey team, her alma mater. During her time at the University of Minnesota, she participated in community service activities with organizations including the White Dove Foundation, Masonic Children's Hospital, and HopeKids.

== Career statistics ==
=== Regular season and playoffs ===
Note: GP = Games played; G = Goals; A = Assists; Pts = Points; PIM = Penalty minutes;

			Regular season					Playoffs
Season	Team	League	GP	G	A	Pts	PIM	GP	G	A	Pts	PIM
2014–15	University of Minnesota	WCHA	41	14	30	44	21	—	—	—	—	—
2015–16	University of Minnesota	WCHA	40	23	26	49	14	—	—	—	—	—
2016–17	University of Minnesota	WCHA	39	19	43	62	16	—	—	—	—	—
2018–19	University of Minnesota	WCHA	37	16	15	31	6	—	—	—	—	—
2019–20	Minnesota	PWHPA	—	—	—	—	—	—	—	—	—	—
2020–21	Minnesota	PWHPA	6	2	5	7	2	—	—	—	—	—
2022–23	Team Scotiabank	PWHPA	20	4	7	11	2	—	—	—	—	—
2023–24	PWHL Minnesota	PWHL	24	4	12	16	2	10	0	2	2	0
2024–25	Minnesota Frost	PWHL	30	3	8	11	12	8	2	3	5	2
2025–26	Minnesota Frost	PWHL	30	16	17	33	6	5	1	3	4	0
PWHL totals			84	23	37	60	20	24	3	8	11	11

=== International ===
Year	Team	Event	Result	GP	G	A	Pts	PIM
2013	United States	U18	2nd place, silver medalist(s)	5	3	2	5	0
2017	United States	WC	1st place, gold medalist(s)	5	0	0	0	0
2018	United States	OG	1st place, gold medalist(s)	5	0	2	2	0
2019	United States	WC	1st place, gold medalist(s)	7	2	3	5	6
2021	United States	WC	2nd place, silver medalist(s)	7	2	3	5	0
2022	United States	OG	2nd place, silver medalist(s)	7	2	4	6	2
2022	United States	WC	2nd place, silver medalist(s)	7	3	1	4	6
2023	United States	WC	1st place, gold medalist(s)	7	0	1	1	27
2024	United States	WC	2nd place, silver medalist(s)	7	0	0	0	6
2025	United States	WC	1st place, gold medalist(s)	7	4	4	8	0
2026	United States	OG	1st place, gold medalist(s)	7	0	2	2	0
Junior totals				5	3	2	5	0
Senior totals				66	13	20	33	47

== Awards and honors ==
Award	Year	Ref
College
WCHA All-Rookie Team	2015	
All-USCHO.com Rookie Team	2015	
AHCA First-Team All-American	2017	
NCAA National Champion (University of Minnesota)	2015, 2016	
PWHL
Walter Cup Champion	2024, 2025	
PWHL Forward of the Year	2026	
PWHL Points Leader	2026	
PWHL Top Goal Scorer	2026	
PWHL All-First Team	2026	
