= Richard Gardner =

Richard Gardner may refer to:

- Richard Gardner (politician) (1812–1856), British Member of Parliament for Leicester
- Richard Nelson Gardner (1881–1953), American lawyer and politician
- Richard N. Gardner (1927–2019), American ambassador to Italy and Spain
- Richard A. Gardner (1931–2003), American psychiatrist
- Richard Gardner (sport shooter) (born 1938), Zimbabwean sports shooter
- Sir Richard Gardner (embryologist) (born 1943), British embryologist and geneticist
- Ritchie Gardner (born 1958), English professional darts player
- Rich Gardner (born 1981), American football player

== See also ==
- Richard Gardiner (disambiguation)
