= Ian Gardiner =

Ian Gardiner may refer to:

- Ian Gardiner (actor) (1928-2021), British actor
- Ian Gardiner (footballer) (1928–1990), Scottish footballer
- Ian Gardiner (artist) (1943–2008), Australian artist
- Ian Gardiner (musician) (born 1952), bass player
- Ian Gardiner (rower), American rower who won a silver medal at the 1967 European Rowing Championships
