= Jenn Gardiner =

Canadian ice hockey player (born 2001)

Jennifer Gardiner
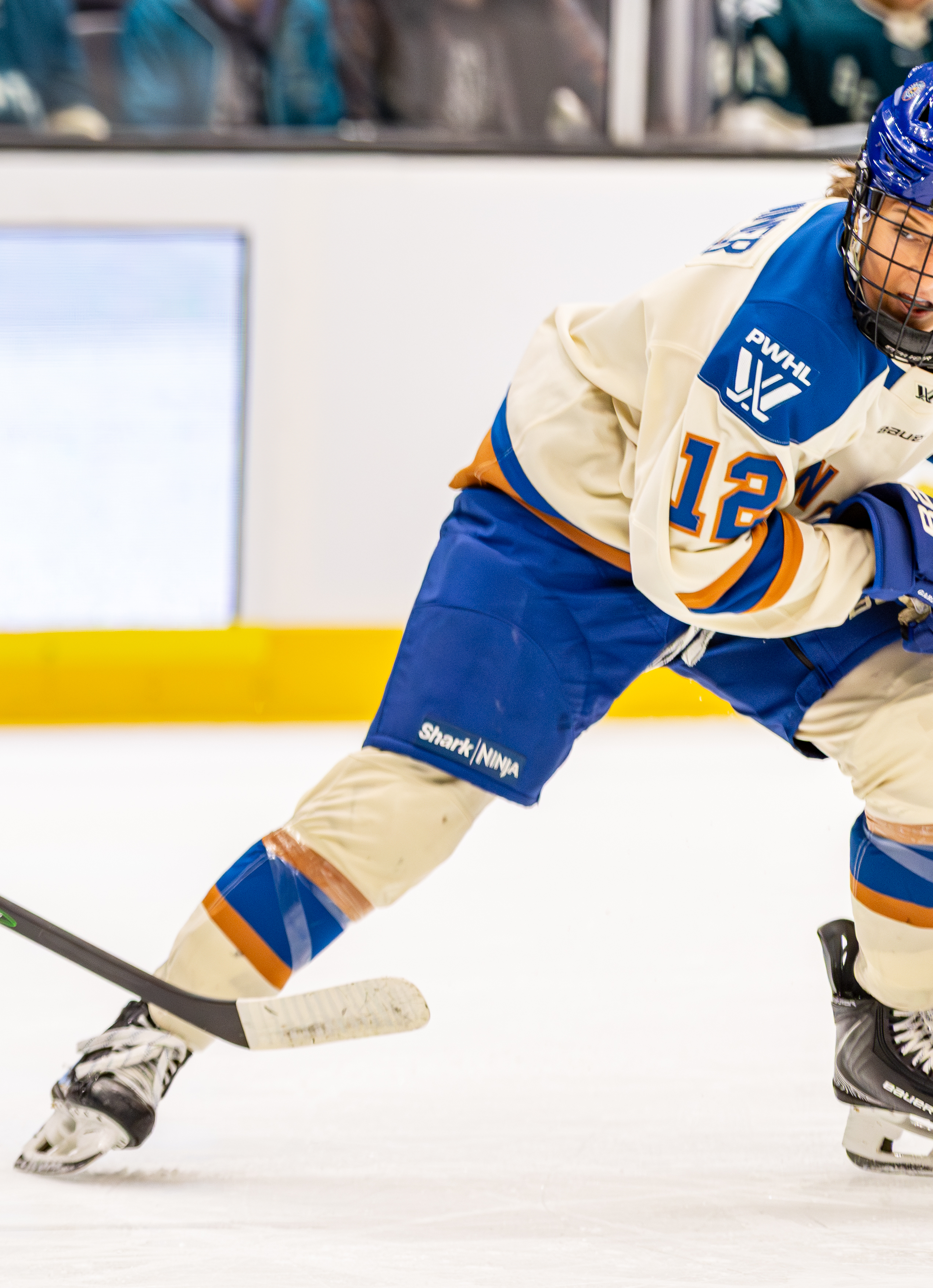
- Born: September 18, 2001 (age 25) Surrey, British Columbia, Canada
- Height: 5 ft 6 in (168 cm)
- Position: Forward
- Shoots: Left
- PWHL team Former teams: Vancouver Goldeneyes; Montreal Victoire
- National team: Canada
- Playing career: 2019–present

Jennifer Gardiner (born September 18, 2001) is a Canadian professional ice hockey forward for the Vancouver Goldeneyes of the Professional Women's Hockey League (PWHL). She previously played for the Montreal Victoire of the PWHL. She played college ice hockey at Ohio State.

== Early life ==
Gardiner was born to Tom and Diane Gardiner, and has a brother, Brad. She attended Lord Tweedsmuir Secondary School and played three seasons for the Greater Vancouver Comets of the BC Elite Hockey League, where she recorded 90 goals and 91 assists in 92 games. She led the league in scoring all three years, and was named a three-time FMAAA all-star team honoree and three-time Provincial Champion.

== Playing career ==
=== College ===
Gardiner began her collegiate career for Ohio State during the 2019–20 season. During her freshman year, she recorded nine goals and six assists in 38 games. During the 2020–21 season in her sophomore year, she recorded a team-high eight goals and seven assists in 20 games, in a season that was shortened due to the COVID-19 pandemic. During the 2021–22 season in her junior year, she recorded 15 goals and 24 assists in 38 games. During the 2022 NCAA tournament, she scored the game-winning goal against Yale in the Frozen Four to help Ohio State advance to the championship game, and lead Ohio State to their first national championship in program history.

During the 2022–23 season in her senior year, she recorded 21 goals and 36 assists in 41 games. She led the team in points with 57. Following the season, she was named to the All-WCHA First Team. During the 2023–24 season, as a graduate student, she recorded 18 goals and 27 assists in 39 games. She ranked second on the team in points with 45. Following the season, she was named to the All-WCHA Third Team. She helped lead the Buckeyes to their second national championship in program history.

Gardiner finished her collegiate career with 71 goals and 100 assists in a program record 176 games. She became only the third Buckeyes player in program history to reach 100 assists.

=== Professional ===
On June 10, 2024, Gardiner was drafted in the second round, 11th overall, by PWHL Montreal in the 2024 PWHL Draft. On July 16, 2024, she signed a two-year contract with Montreal. During the 2024–25 season, in her rookie season with the Victoire, she recorded five goals and 13 assists in 30 regular season games. During the 2025 PWHL playoffs, she recorded three assists in four games.

During the league's expansion to eight teams ahead of the 2025–26 season, Gardiner was left unprotected by the Victoire and signed a one-year contract with the Vancouver Goldeneyes on June 5, 2025.

On April 18, 2026 in a game against the Seattle Torrent, Gardiner became the first player in PWHL history to score four goals in a single game, including the game winner in overtime. Her teammate Hannah Miller also broke a PWHL record in the same game by becoming the first player in league history with two four-point games.

== International play ==
Medal record

Representing Canada

Ice hockey

Olympic Games
Silver medal – second place	2026 Milano Cortina	Team

World Championships
Silver medal – second place	2025 Czechia	

World U18 Championships
Gold medal – first place	2019 Japan	

Gardiner represented Canada at the 2019 IIHF World Women's U18 Championship where she was scoreless in four games and won a gold medal.

On March 21, 2025, she was selected to represent Canada at the 2025 IIHF Women's World Championship where she made her senior national team debut. She played on Canada's top line with Montreal Victoire teammates Marie-Philip Poulin and Laura Stacey. During the first preliminary round game against Finland, she recorded two goals and one assist. She led the tournament in goals with six, and ranked second on the team in points with ten, and won a silver medal.

On January 9, 2026, Gardiner was named to Canada's roster to compete at the 2026 Winter Olympics, one of six Canadian skaters who made their Olympic debut as Canada played Switzerland on February 7, 2026. In their final game of preliminary round play, Gardiner scored her first Olympic goal (also the game-winning goal) as Canada beat Finland 5–0.

== Career statistics ==
=== Regular season and playoffs ===
			Regular season					Playoffs
Season	Team	League	GP	G	A	Pts	PIM	GP	G	A	Pts	PIM
2019–20	Ohio State University	WCHA	38	9	6	15	4	—	—	—	—	—
2020–21	Ohio State University	WCHA	20	8	7	15	6	—	—	—	—	—
2021–22	Ohio State University	WCHA	38	15	24	39	18	—	—	—	—	—
2022–23	Ohio State University	WCHA	41	21	36	57	13	—	—	—	—	—
2023–24	Ohio State University	WCHA	39	18	27	45	2	—	—	—	—	—
2024–25	Montreal Victoire	PWHL	30	5	13	18	2	4	0	3	3	0
2025–26	Vancouver Goldeneyes	PWHL	30	9	10	19	4	—	—	—	—	—
PWHL totals			60	14	23	37	6	4	0	3	3	0

=== International ===
Year	Team	Event	Result	GP	G	A	Pts	PIM
2019	Canada	U18	1st place, gold medalist(s)	4	0	0	0	0
2025	Canada	WC	2nd place, silver medalist(s)	7	6	4	10	0
2026	Canada	OG	2nd place, silver medalist(s)	7	1	0	1	0
Junior totals				4	0	0	0	0
Senior totals				14	7	4	11	0

== Awards and honours ==
Honors	Year
PWHL
All-Rookie Team	2025
