= Ian Gardiner (musician) =

Canadian bass guitarist

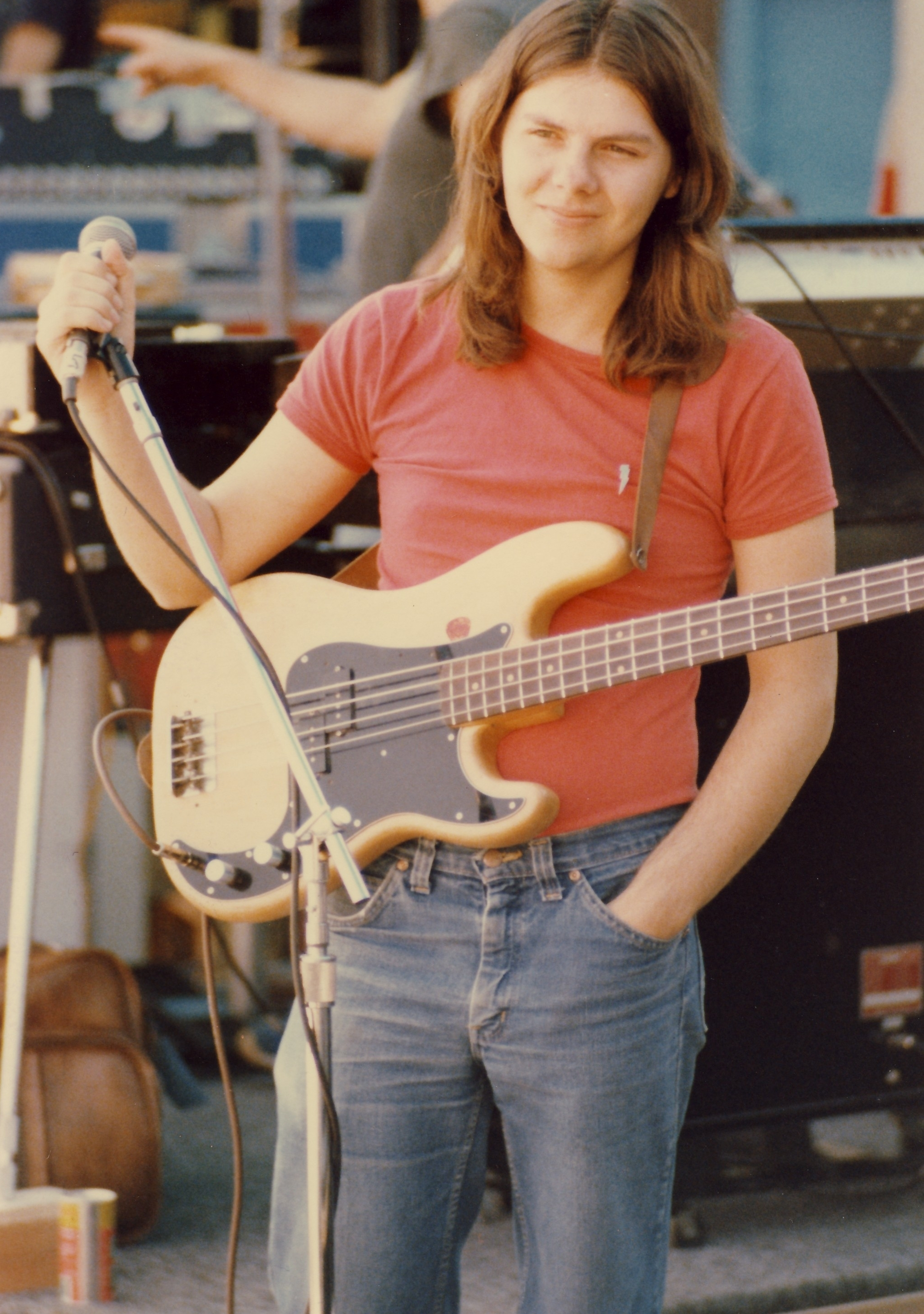

Ian L. Gardiner (born December 4, 1952, in Winnipeg, Manitoba) is a bass player (jazz, rock, blues). He has played with Burton Cummings, formerly of the Guess Who ("American Woman", "No Time", "Undun", "Stand Tall"), Lenny Breau, Makanda Ken McIntyre, Randy Bachman and many other musicians. He's produced Bo Diddley, The Bonedaddys and The Delphines; engineered Supertramp and The Knack, and more. Since 1996, he designs and manufactures custom pro audio gear and recording consoles, as the founder of Boutique Audio & Design and co-founder of Tree Audio, located in Los Angeles, California.

== Biography ==
As a teen, Ian Gardiner was surrounded by creativity. Neil Young, Burton Cummings, Lenny Breau and Randy Bachman all began there right about that time in his hometown. Winnipeg author and rock historian John Einarson said, "Winnipeg's isolation allowed for a strong and vibrant local music scene to grow and flourish."

Regarding those days in the mid-1960s, Gardiner recalled, "Winnipeg, at that time, had the best music scene in Canada, by far. Each neighborhood had a community club, which consisted of a hockey rink, or two, and a hall with a stage where dances were held Friday, Saturday and sometimes on Sunday nights. Back then, there was no drinking or drugs. The main rush was just seeing all of the bands." One of the bands he would see was The Deverons, Burton Cummings' band, whom Gardiner would later play with when Cummings went solo.

In 1965, surrounded by Winnipeg's exciting music scene and after seeing The Beatles on Ed Sullivan, thirteen-year-old Gardiner joined his first band: Ragnar and the Pagans. Soon, he and his good friend Glen Hall began listening to more eclectic music, Frank Zappa and jazz. At about seventeen, Gardiner started playing with Winnipeg jazz players: Al Thumbler at a Winnipeg pub called the Big "A"; jazz drummer Bill Graham at The Old Bailey Lounge, and with jazz guitarist Lenny Breau at the Ting Tea Room.

1972 to 1974, Gardiner played bass in the band for Manitoba Theatre Centre Productions of Jaques Brel is Alive and Well and Living in Paris and Jubalay.

In the mid to late 1970s, Gardiner joined Winnipeg band Mood Jga Jga. By 1976, he began playing bass with Burton Cummings, after Cummings left The Guess Who. 1978, Gardiner played with Cummings on "Dream of a Child," which went on to earn a Juno Award for record of the year, and was the first ever triple platinum album for a Canadian artist.

1980, Gardiner co-wrote the song "Fine State of Affairs" with Cummings, which later won a SOCAN Award. Another song Gardiner wrote with Cummings, "Love Dream," won a SOCAN Award in 1986.

1987, Gardiner co-produced Bo Diddley's "Surfer's Love Chant" for the John Cusack and Tim Robbins movie Tapeheads, with The Bonedaddys' King Cotton as co-producer. With R.E.M's Peter Buck, Gardiner co-produced The Moberlys. 1996, he produced and engineered former Go-Go's guitarist Kathy Valentine and bass player Dominique Davalos' band The Delphines in the living room of his Topanga Canyon home, along with The Knack's Bruce Gary as co-producer.

While he still plays bass, since 1996 Ian Gardiner designs and manufactures custom professional audio gear and recording consoles in his two businesses: Boutique Audio & Design and Tree Audio, which he runs with his business partner Steve Firlotte from Inward Connections.

== Discography ==
- Orchestra: Jubalay Productions soundtrack - Bass (1974)
- Lenny Breau: CBC Radio Canada Broadcasting - Bass (1974)
- Burton Cummings: Burton Cummings - Bass (1976)
- Burton Cummings: My Own Way to Rock - Bass (1977)
- Burton Cummings: Dream of a Child - Bass (1978)
- Various: California Dreaming soundtrack - Bass (1978)
- Dann Rogers: Hearts Under Fire - Producer/Bass/vocals (1978)
- Bette Midler: Don’t Cry out Loud (demo) - Bass (1978)
- Randy Bachman: Survivor - Bass (1978)
- Various: Epitaph for a Legend - Cover Design (1980)
- Eddie Schwartz: Hit Me with Your Best Shot (demo)- bass (1980)
- Burton Cummings: Woman Love - Bass (1980)
- Burton Cummings: Daddy's on the Road - Co-Writer (1980)
- Burton Cummings: Fine State of Affairs - Co-Writer (1980)
- Glen Hall: The Book of the Heart - Mixing (1981)
- Maclean and Maclean: Locked up for Laughs - Bass (1983)
- Burton Cummings: Love Dream - Co-Writer (1984)
- Bo Diddley: Surfer's Love Chant/Tapeheads soundtrack - Co-producer (1988)
- Various: Sweatin’ to the Oldies 2- Engineer (1990)
- Hand of Fate: Hand of Fate - Mixing/Engineer (1990)
- Blue X: Know Now No - Co-Writer (1992)
- Jim Basnight: Pop Top - Producer (1992)
- The Moberlys: Sibelius: Symphony No. 2; Karelia Suite - Co-Producer (1995)
- Alvin & the Chipmunks: A Very Merry Chipmunk - Engineer (1995)
- The Delphines: The Delphines - Producer/Mixing/Engineer (1996)
- Supertramp: Some Things Never Change - Engineer (1997)
- Preston Lane: Preston Lane - Producer (2000)
- The Knack: Normal as the Next Guy - Assistant Engineer (2001)
- The Bonedaddys: Garage Sale - Producer/Mixing (2004)
- Dick Wagner: Full Meltdown - Bass (2009)
- Kanarek: Looking Back Ahead - Bass (2009)
