= Les Gardner =

Australian rules footballer (1923–2019)

Personal information
- Full name: Leslie Harry Gardner
- Born: 30 September 1923; Malvern East, Victoria
- Died: 28 May 2019 (aged 95)
- Original team: Prahran
- Height: 178 cm (5 ft 10 in)
- Weight: 78 kg (172 lb)

Playing career^{1}
Years	Club	Games (Goals)
1947	St Kilda	3 (0)
- ^{1} Playing statistics correct to the end of 1947.

Leslie Harry Gardner (30 September 1923 – 28 May 2019) was an Australian rules footballer who played with St Kilda in the Victorian Football League (VFL).
