= Walter Cup playoffs =

Elimination tournament in the Professional Women's Hockey League

PWHL Walter Cup Playoffs
- Current season, competition or edition: 2026 Walter Cup playoffs
- Sport: Ice hockey
- Founded: May 8, 2024
- First season: 2024 PWHL playoffs
- No. of teams: 8
- Country: Canada; United States
- Most recent champion: Montreal Victoire (1st title)
- Most titles: Minnesota Frost (2 titles)
- Qualification: Top 4 teams by points per conference
- Website: www.thepwhl.com/en/playoffs

The Walter Cup playoffs (officially the PWHL Walter Cup Playoffs; French: Séries éliminatoires de la Coupe Walter de la LPHF) is the annual playoff tournament of the Professional Women's Hockey League (PWHL) that determines the league champion and winner of the Walter Cup. The playoffs consist of three rounds: the conference semifinals, conference finals & the PWHL Finals. All series are played in a best-of-five format with a 2–2–1 home ice arrangement, except the conference semifinals, which is best-of-three & arranged odd-even.

The playoffs feature several unique elements, most notably the playoff opponent selection rule, where the top-seeded team chooses its conference semifinal opponent from the third- and fourth-seeded teams. The playoffs began in May 2024, with the Minnesota Frost winning the first two championships (2024 and 2025) and the Montreal Victoire winning the third to date.

== Format ==
=== Qualification ===
At the conclusion of the 30-game PWHL regular season, the top four teams by points qualify for the playoffs. Teams earn points using a 3-2-1-0 system:

- 3 points for a regulation win
- 2 points for an overtime or shootout win
- 1 point for an overtime or shootout loss
- 0 points for a regulation loss

If teams are tied in points, the tiebreakers are (better conference record; then coin toss/drawing of lots is used if the criteria below fail):

1. Greater number of regulation wins
2. Head-to-head record
3. Goal differential

=== Playoff opponent selection ===
One of the most distinctive features of the PWHL playoffs is the playoff opponent selection rule. The conference winner is given a 24-hour window after the regular season concludes to choose its conference semifinal opponent from either the third- or fourth-seeded team. The runner-up team then faces the remaining team.

This rule gives the top seed a strategic advantage, allowing them to select the matchup they feel most confident about. The selection is announced publicly through league channels.

=== Series format ===
All rounds of the playoffs, except the conference semifinals, which is best-of-three & uses odd-even basis (higher seed hosts the odd games, the third if needed), use a best-of-five series format with a 2–2–1 home ice arrangement:

- The higher-seeded team hosts games 1 & 2, plus 5 if needed
- The lower-seeded team hosts games 3, plus 4 if needed

==== Overtime rules ====
Unlike the regular season, playoff games use traditional sudden-death overtime periods, the same way the NHL does. If a game is tied after regulation:

- Playoff overtime consists of full-strength 5-on-5 play
- 20-minute sudden-death overtime periods continue until a goal is scored
- No shootouts are used in playoff games

This differs from regular season overtime, which features 5 minutes of 3-on-3 play followed by a best-of-five shootout if necessary.

== History ==
=== 2024 playoffs ===
The inaugural PWHL playoffs began on May 8, 2024, and concluded on May 29, 2024. Toronto finished first in the regular season and exercised the playoff opponent selection rule, choosing to play fourth-place Minnesota. This left Montreal (2nd) to face Boston (3rd).

Semifinals:

- Minnesota defeated Toronto 3–2 in a five-game series
- Boston defeated Montreal 3–0, winning all three games in overtime

Finals: Minnesota defeated Boston 3–2 in a five-game series to capture the first Walter Cup championship. The decisive Game 5 ended 3–0, with Nicole Hensley earning a shutout and Liz Schepers scoring the championship-winning goal.

Taylor Heise led all playoff scorers and was awarded the inaugural Ilana Kloss Playoff Most Valuable Player Award.

=== 2025 playoffs ===
The 2025 playoffs began on May 7, 2025, and concluded on May 26, 2025. Montreal finished first and selected third-place Ottawa as their opponent, leaving Toronto (2nd) to face Minnesota (4th).

Semifinals:

- Ottawa defeated Montreal 3–1, with Game 2 lasting 4 overtimes (15:33 in the 4th OT) – the longest game in PWHL history
- Minnesota defeated Toronto 3–1, winning three consecutive games after losing Game 1

Finals: Minnesota defeated Ottawa 3–1 to win their second consecutive Walter Cup. All four games were decided by 2–1 overtime scores, marking only the second time in professional hockey history that a championship series featured four consecutive overtime games.

Liz Schepers scored the championship-winning goal in overtime of Game 4, making her the only player to score championship-winning goals in consecutive years. Lee Stecklein became the first defender in PWHL playoff history to lead in scoring with 8 points.

Gwyneth Philips of the Ottawa Charge was awarded the Ilana Kloss Playoff MVP Award, becoming the second consecutive rookie to win the award, the first goaltender, and the first player from the losing team to receive the honor. Philips led all goaltenders with a 1.23 goals-against average and .952 save percentage in eight playoff starts, posting four wins and one shutout without losing a game in regulation.

=== 2026 playoffs ===
The 2026 playoffs began April 30, 2026, and concluded May 20, 2026. The first placed Montreal selected Minnesota (3rd) as their opponent, leaving Ottawa (4th) to take on Boston (2nd).

Semifinals:

- Ottawa defeated Boston 3-1
- Montreal defeated Minnesota 3-2, eliminating them for the first time in PWHL history.

Finals: Montreal defeated Ottawa 3-1, earning the first championship in franchise history as well as being the first time the championship had been won by a Canadian team.

Marie-Philip Poulin was awarded the Ilana Kloss Playoff MVP award.

== Playoff results by year ==
PWHL playoff champions
Year	Champion	Runner-up	Finals result	Playoff MVP	Reference
2024	Minnesota Frost	Boston Fleet	3–2	Taylor Heise	
2025	Minnesota Frost	Ottawa Charge	3–1	Gwyneth Philips	
2026	Montreal Victoire	Ottawa Charge	4–0	Marie-Philip Poulin	

== Playoff opponent selections ==
First-place team playoff opponent selections
Year	First place team	Selected opponent	Seed	Result
2024	Toronto Sceptres	Minnesota Frost	4th	Lost 2–3
2025	Montreal Victoire	Ottawa Charge	3rd	Lost 1–3
2026	Montreal Victoire	Minnesota Frost	3rd	Won 3–2

== Attendance ==
The PWHL playoffs have drawn strong attendance figures, building on the league's regular season success.

=== 2024 playoffs ===
The 2024 playoffs drew 84,040 fans in 12 playoff games (overall average: 7,230). During the regular season, the league set new attendance records and "sold merchandise faster than they could keep it in stock", and gained a long list of corporate sponsors.

=== 2025 playoffs ===
The 2025 PWHL Finals averaged 8,378 fans per game, an 11.6% increase over the 2024 Finals (7,504 average). Game 4 drew a playoff-high 11,024 fans at Minnesota's Xcel Energy Center.

Total playoff attendance for the 2024–25 season was 84,040 across 12 games. Combined with regular season attendance, the league reached 737,455 total fans for the season.

== Broadcast coverage ==
=== United States & International ===
In the United States, playoff coverage varies by team market:

- All games stream free on YouTube for U.S. and international viewers
- Regional sports networks including FanDuel Sports Network, MSG Network, and NESN

=== Canada ===
In Canada, playoff games are broadcast on TSN (English) and RDS (French). The PWHL Finals air exclusively on TSN/RDS

== Records and statistics ==
=== Team records ===
- Most consecutive championships: Minnesota Frost (2, 2024-2025)
- Most playoff appearances: 2 teams tied (3)
- Perfect playoff record at home: Minnesota Frost (6–1 all-time through 2025)

==== Special achievements ====
- First championship-winning goal scorer: Liz Schepers, PWHL Minnesota (2024)
- Only player to score championship-winning goals in consecutive years: Liz Schepers, Minnesota (2024, 2025)
- First player from losing team to win Playoff MVP: Gwyneth Philips, Ottawa Charge (2025)
- First goaltender to win Playoff MVP: Gwyneth Philips, Ottawa Charge (2025)
- Most consecutive overtime games in a series: 4 (2025 Finals, all games went to OT)

=== Notable series records ===
- Longest game: 4 overtimes, 15:33 in 4th OT – Montreal vs Ottawa, Game 2, 2025 Semifinals (total time: 5 hours, 32 minutes)
- Highest-scoring game: 7–5 – Minnesota vs Toronto, Game 3, 2025 Semifinals
- Most games won by shutout, single playoff year: Minnesota Frost, 4 (2024)
- Perfect penalty kill, playoffs: Minnesota Frost (19/19, 2024)

== See also ==
- Walter Cup
- Ilana Kloss Playoff MVP
- Professional Women's Hockey League
