= Budvar Arena =

Indoor sporting arena in České Budějovice, Czech Republic

- Budvar aréna

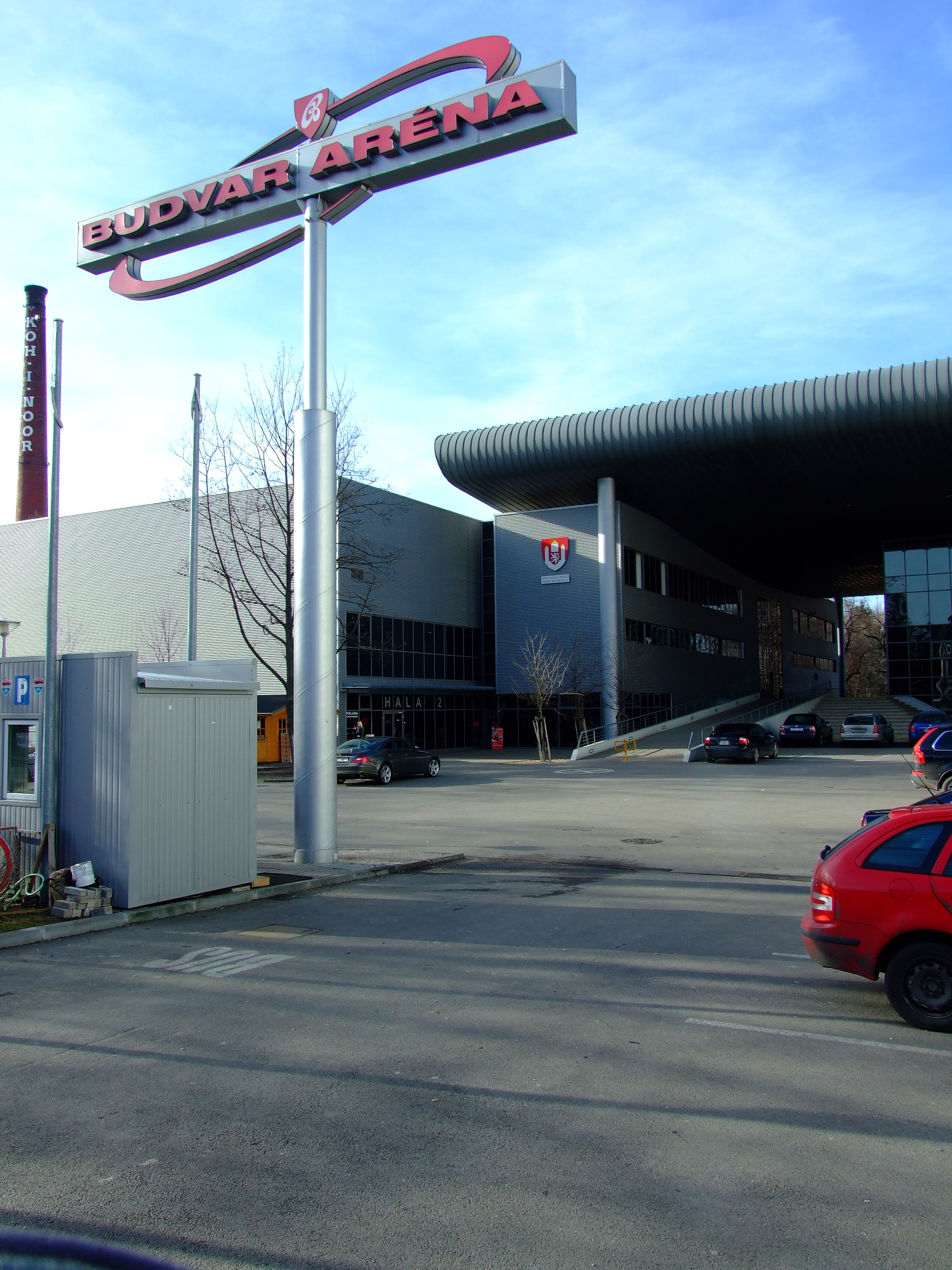
- Interactive map of Budvar Arena
- Location: Františka Antonína Gerstnera 7/8, České Budějovice, Czech Republic, 370 01
- Coordinates: 48°58′14.870″N 14°28′16.183″E
- Owner: České Budějovice
- Operator: SZMCB
- Capacity: 6421

Construction
- Opened: 27 October 1946
- Renovated: 2002

Budvar Arena is an indoor sporting arena located in České Budějovice, Czech Republic. It is used as the home ice of Motor České Budějovice, which currently plays in the Czech Extraliga. The arena opened in October 1946 and has since undergone several renovations, being almost completely rebuilt in 2002. The current capacity of the arena is 6,421 people.
