= Richard Gardiner =

Richard Gardiner may refer to:

- Sir Richard Gardiner (politician) (died 1489), Lord Mayor of London and member of parliament
- Richard Gardiner (Irish priest), Dean of St Patrick's Cathedral, Dublin, 1238–1250
- Richard Gardiner (English divine) (1591–1670), English divine
- Ricky Gardiner (born 1948), Scottish guitarist and composer

== See also ==
- Richard Gardiner Willis (1865–1929), Canadian politician
- Richard Gardner (disambiguation)
