= Linnéa Johansson =

Swedish ice hockey player (born 2002)

- Born: 5 April 2002 (age 23); Ljungby, Sweden
- Height: 171 cm (5 ft 7 in)
- Weight: 65 kg (143 lb; 10 st 3 lb)
- Position: Left Wing
- Shoots: Left
- SDHL team Former teams: Luleå HF/MSSK: Linköping HC; IF Troja-Ljungby; HV71; Karlskrona HK
- Playing career: 2015–present

Linnéa Johansson (born 5 April 2002) is a Swedish ice hockey left winger and member of the Swedish national team, currently playing in the Swedish Women's Hockey League (SDHL) with Luleå HF/MSSK. She represented Sweden at the 2022 Winter Olympics and the 2022 IIHF Women's World Championship.

== Playing career ==
Johansson grew up playing ice hockey with boys, including Malmö Redhawks defenceman Helge Grans, at the Tre Kronors Hockeyskola in her hometown of Ljungby, in south-central Sweden.

At the age of 14, she joined Karlskrona HK, playing with their women's team in the Damettan and in the club's youth system. She made her SDHL debut in the 2016–17 season, after being called up by HV71, getting two assists in seven games as well as playing in four playoff games. During the 2016–17 season, she also played fifteen games with the women's team of IF Troja-Ljungby in the Damettan and was active with minor teams of IF Troja-Ljungby.

After putting up 7 points in 25 games with HV71 in the 2017–18 SDHL season, and growing increasingly dissatisfied with the way girls were treated in the co-ed Troja-Ljungby youth teams, she left the city to sign with Linköping HC.

She scored 7 points in 19 games in her first year with Linköping before being sidelined due to a concussion sustained while playing with the national U18 team. She missed the first nine games of the 2019–20 SDHL season as well before returning to the ice.

=== International ===
As a junior player, Johansson was a member of the Swedish national under-18 team during 2016 to 2020, and participated in the IIHF U18 Women's World Championship in 2018 and 2020.
