= Joseph Gardiner (New South Wales politician) =

Australian politician

Joseph Reuben Gardiner (1879 – 5 February 1941) was an English-born Australian politician.

He was born in Bristol to Charles Henry Gardiner and Marie Kate Ponting. He migrated to New South Wales around 1883 and became a bootmaker, eventually establishing a boot manufacturing firm. He married Rachel Harris, with whom he had a daughter. He acquired property in Sydney, notably in Wynyard where he built the Plaza Hotel. From 1934 to 1937 he was an independent member of the New South Wales Legislative Council. Gardiner died in Randwick in 1941.
