= Walter Cup =

Professional Women's Hockey League championship trophy

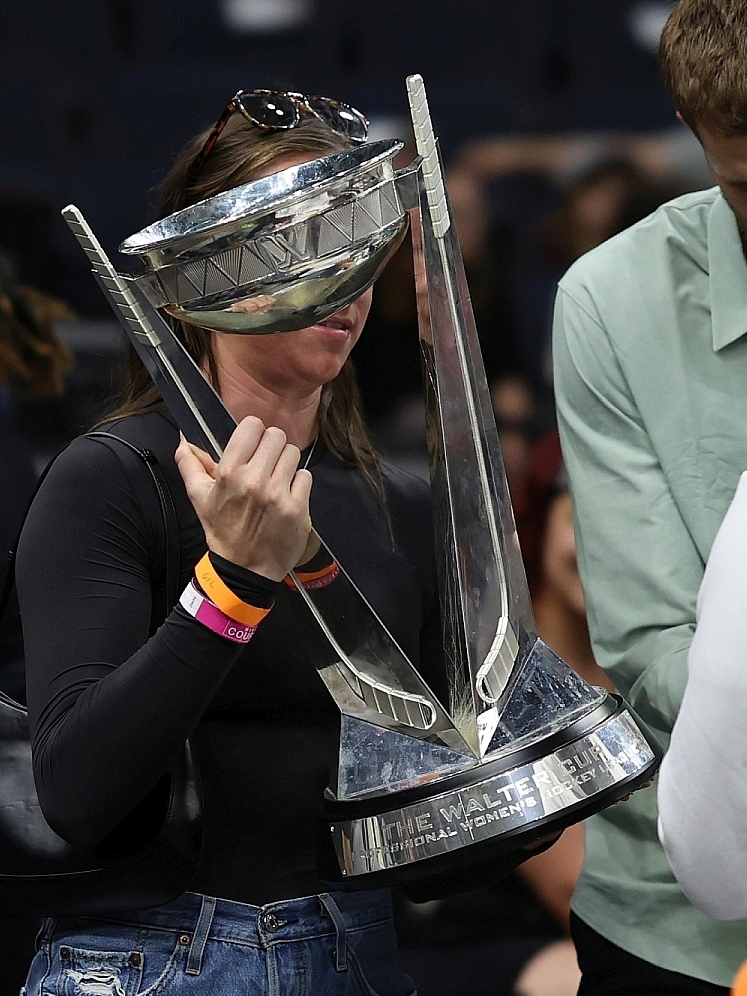
- Taylor Heise holding the Walter Cup in 2024
- Sport: Ice hockey
- Competition: Walter Cup playoffs
- Awarded for: Playoff champion of the Professional Women's Hockey League (PWHL)

History
- First award: 2024
- First winner: Minnesota Frost (Note: The Frost played the 2024 season as PWHL Minnesota.)
- Most wins: Minnesota Frost (2)
- Most recent: Montreal Victoire (1st) (2026)

The Walter Cup (French: La coupe Walter) is the championship trophy awarded to the winner of the Walter Cup playoffs (French: Séries éliminatoires de la Coupe Walter de la LPHF), which culminate in an annual best-of-five series that determines the champion of the Professional Women's Hockey League (PWHL). The trophy is named in honour of PWHL co-founders and spouses Mark Walter and Kimbra Walter. Two teams have won the Cup since its establishment: the Minnesota Frost in both 2024 and 2025, and the Montreal Victoire in 2026.

The Walter Cup is permanently on display at the Hockey Hall of Fame in Toronto. In contrast to the Stanley Cup, a replica of the Walter Cup is made for each year's champions.

== History ==
The founding of the PWHL in 2023 as the top level of professional women's hockey in North America raised the question of what championship the new league's teams would play for. Both the defunct Canadian Women's Hockey League and Premier Hockey Federation had historical trophies in the Clarkson Cup and Isobel Cup, respectively, and it was suggested that one or both might have been fitting for the new league, including by Adrienne Clarkson, the namesake of the former. However, on April 4, 2024, the PWHL announced in a press release that it would unveil a new championship trophy. The name Walter Cup was proposed by Billie Jean King, one of the two initiators of the league and member of the league's advisory board, in honour of the league's financial backers, Mark and Kimbra Walter, to recognize their commitment to enabling the creation of the PWHL.

On May 29, 2024, Minnesota became the first Walter Cup champions when they defeated Boston 3–0 in the fifth and deciding game of the inaugural season's championship series. Minnesota was successful in defending their title, winning a second Walter Cup championship in 2025 by defeating the Ottawa Charge in the Final. In 2026, the Montréal Victoire became the first Canadian team—and the first team other than Minnesota—to win the Walter Cup championship when they defeated the Charge in the Final.

On August 21, 2026, the PWHL reported that the replica of the trophy made for the 2026 champion Victoire went missing while in transit to Lethbridge, Alberta, the hometown of Victoire forward Dara Greig. The trophy was found three days later and returned to the Victoire. The League did not disclose where it was found nor the circumstances surrounding its disappearance.

== Design ==
The sterling silver Walter Cup trophy was designed by the luxury jeweler Tiffany & Co. The cup weighs approximately 35 pounds, measures 24 inches in height and over 13 inches in width. It rests on a ring around which sits six 'W's, symbol of the PWHL, and rays of light representing the dawn of a new era in women's hockey. It is located at the top of angled rods, identifying the playing ice marked with skating marks, on which sits hockey sticks. The rods rest on a removable base, representing a puck, on which the name of the winning team each year is engraved.

== List of winners ==
Year	Winning team	Series	Losing team	Playoff MVP	Winning coach	Win #
2024	Minnesota Frost	3–2	Boston Fleet (Note: The Fleet played the 2024 season as PWHL Boston.)	Taylor Heise	Ken Klee	1
2025	Minnesota Frost	3–1	Ottawa Charge	Gwyneth Philips	Ken Klee	2
2026	Montreal Victoire	3–1	Ottawa Charge	Marie-Philip Poulin	Kori Cheverie	1

== See also ==
- Isobel Cup, awarded to winners of the predecessor Premier Hockey Federation (2016–2023).
- Clarkson Cup, awarded to the Canadian women's national champion team (2009–2019).
