= Les Gardiner (Scottish footballer) =

Scottish footballer (1918–1991)

Leslie Lickley Gardiner (10 August 1918 – 6 February 1991) was a Scottish professional footballer who played 14 games in the Football League for Torquay United.

Gardiner was born in Dundee in August 1918. Gardiner, an outside left, began his career with Hibernian. He made 15 appearances and scored five goals in the Scottish Football League during the 1936–37 season, before joining Torquay United in 1937. He scored on his Torquay debut, netting the only goal in Torquay's home win against Walsall. He scored five goals in 16 games that season before leaving to join Clapton Orient. However, he failed to make the Orient first team and left league football.

Gardiner was appointed manager of then Parthenon League side Canvey Island in 1961. Gardiner died in Dundee on 6 February 1991, at the age of 72.
