= Baron Gardner =

Title in the Peerage of Ireland

- Creation date: 23 December 1800 (Ire); 27 November 1806 (UK)
- Created by: King George III (Ire & UK)
- Peerage: Peerage of Ireland; Peerage of the United Kingdom
- Baronetage: Gardner of Uttoxeter
- First holder: Alan Gardner, 1st Baron Gardner (Ire & UK)
- Last holder: Alan Gardner, 3rd Baron Gardner (Ire & UK)
- Remainder to: The 1st Baron's heirs male of the body lawfully begotten (Ire & UK).
- Status: Dormant (2 November 1883)

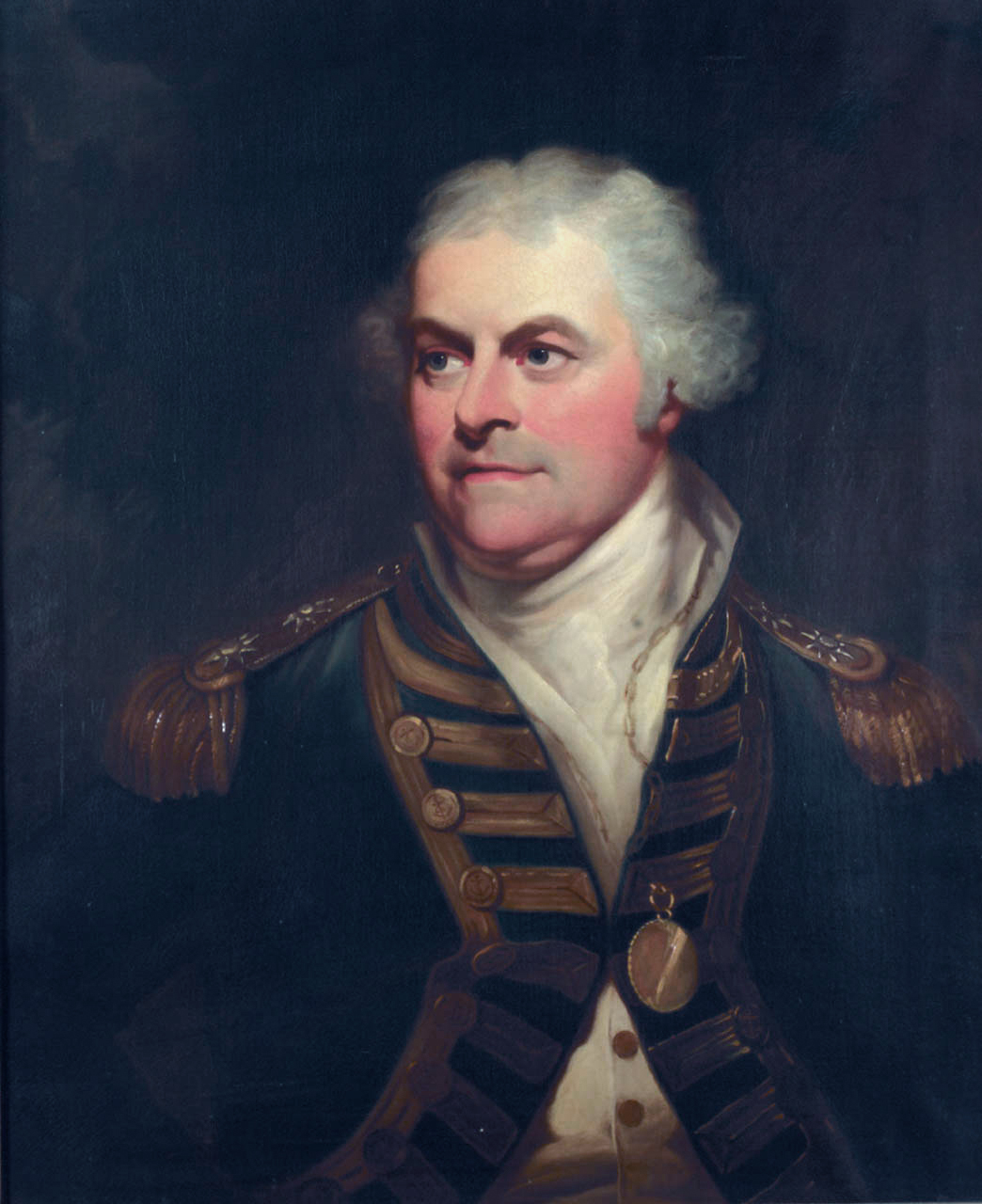
Alan Gardner, 1st Baron Gardner

Baron Gardner, of Uttoxeter, is a dormant title in the Peerage of Ireland. It was created in 1800 for Sir Alan Gardner, an Admiral of the Blue and former Member of Parliament for Plymouth and Westminster. In 1806, he was also created Baron Gardner, of Uttoxeter in the County of Stafford, in the Peerage of the United Kingdom. His son, the second Baron, was also an Admiral in the Royal Navy. In 1815, it was announced that he was to be created a viscount, but Lord Gardner died before the patent had passed the Great Seal.

He was succeeded by his son, the third Baron. He was a Whig politician and served as a Lord-in-waiting (government whip in the House of Lords) from 1837 to 1841. On his death in 1883 the peerages became dormant. They were claimed by Alan Gardner, grandson of the second son of the first Baron, who styled himself "Lord Gardner", but neither he nor any other male-line descendant have been able to prove their claim to the titles satisfactorily. It has been suggested by William Dalrymple that the current heir to the barony is from the Gardner family of Khasgunge (now Kasganj), Uttar Pradesh, India.

Another member of the Gardner family was the Liberal politician Herbert Gardner, 1st Baron Burghclere. He was the illegitimate son of the third Baron Gardner.

== Barons Gardner, first and second creations (1800, 1806) ==
- Alan Gardner, 1st Baron Gardner (1742–1809)
- Alan Hyde Gardner, 2nd Baron Gardner (1771–1815)
- Alan Legge Gardner, 3rd Baron Gardner (1810–1883)

== See also ==
- Baron Burghclere

== Notes ==
Baronetage of Great Britain
Preceded by Bowyer baronets	Gardner baronets of Uttoxeter; 9 September 1794	Succeeded by Curtis baronets
