= Alan Gardner, 2nd Baron Gardner =

Royal Navy officer (1770–1815)

Vice-Admiral the Right Honourable The Lord Gardner KCB
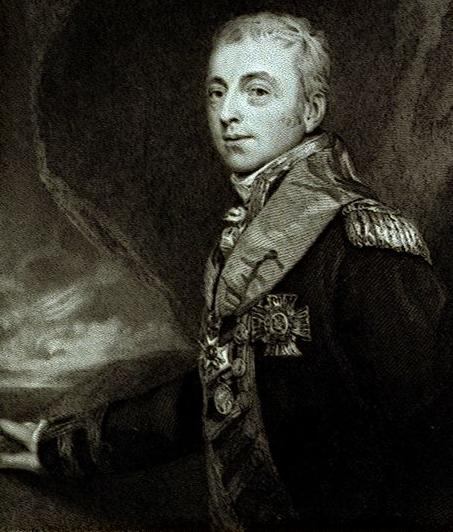
- Vice-Admiral the Lord Gardner, 1815
- Born: 5 February 1770; Uttoxeter, Staffordshire, England
- Died: 22 December 1815 (aged 45); Berkeley Square, London
- Burial place: St James's Church, Westminster
- Relatives: Admiral the Hon. Francis Ffarington Gardner (brother); General the Hon. William Henry Gardner (brother); Colonel William Linnæus Gardner (cousin)
- Military career
- Allegiance: Great Britain; United Kingdom
- Branch: Royal Navy
- Service years: 1781–1815
- Rank: Vice-Admiral
- Commands: HMS Cygnet; HMS Daphne; HMS Circe; HMS Heroine; HMS Ruby; HMS Resolution; HMS Hero
- Conflicts: American Revolutionary War; Battle of the Saintes (WIA); French Revolutionary Wars; West Indies Campaign; Invasion of Ceylon; Napoleonic Wars; Trafalgar Campaign; Battle of Cape Finisterre; Battle of Cape Ortegal; Walcheren Expedition
- Awards: KCB (1815); Naval Gold Medal (1808)

Vice-Admiral Alan Hyde Gardner, 2nd Baron Gardner, KCB (5 February 1770 – 22 December 1815), was a decorated Royal Navy officer and member of the House of Lords.

== Naval career and titles ==
The eldest son of Admiral Alan Gardner, 1st Baron Gardner, he followed his father into the Royal Navy joining as a midshipman in 1781. Serving under his father aboard HMS Duke, Alan Hyde Gardner saw action being wounded at the Battle of the Saintes in 1782 and was commissioned as lieutenant on 12 January 1787. In 1796 he was promoted captain of the frigate HMS Heroine, and in 1802 he was commanding HMS Resolution. Given command in 1805 of 74-gun HMS Hero, Captain Gardner was present at the action off Ferrol, before leading the vanguard at the Battle of Cape Finisterre later that year.

Promoted rear-admiral in 1808, he succeeded as Baron Gardner upon the death of his father on 1 January 1809 taking his seat in the House of Lords in May 1809.

In 1810 Gardner was appointed Commander-in-Chief, North Sea, at Yarmouth, Norfolk, but resigned his post in May 1811 following the untimely death of his wife. He was then promoted vice-admiral on 4 December 1813.

Appointed a Knight Commander of the Order of the Bath on 2 January 1815, and gazetted behalf the Prince Regent on 30 September to be advanced as a Viscount, Lord Gardner died before his letters patent passed the Great Seal, so the viscountcy was not created, despite being so titled in his Will.

Lord Gardner died on 22 December 1815 in Berkeley Square, being buried at St James's Church, Westminster. His only son, Alan Legge Gardner, inherited the family titles after it was formally established in 1825 that his first wife's son (born 1802) was illegitimate.

== Marriage and issue ==
Gardner married twice, firstly without issue (annulled), and secondly having issue (two children):

1. His first marriage (as Captain Gardner) was on 9 March 1796 in India to Maria Elizabeth Adderley (1780–1831), only daughter of Thomas Adderley MP (1712–1791) and his wife Margaretta née Bourke (1766–1796), and (after her mother's second marriage in 1792) step-daughter of the Hon. Robert Hobart, then Governor of Madras. Disappointed to learn in June 1803 of his wife's adultery and secret delivery of a child, Gardner brought ecclesiastical legal proceedings which led to the marriage's annulment and dissolution by Act of Parliament in 1805, citing her adultery with Henry Devereux Jadis (father of her son, Henry Fenton Gardner later Jadis, who was declared illegitimate by the House of Lords in 1825). According to the Treatise on Adulterine Bastardy, the divorced Mrs Gardner promptly married her lover at St Marylebone Parish Church, raising their child as Henry Fenton Jadis.
2. His second marriage (as Lord Gardner) was on 10 April 1809 to the Hon. Charlotte Elizabeth Smith (1784 – 27 March 1811), third daughter of Robert Smith, 1st Baron Carrington, by his wife Anne Boldero-Barnard. The couple had one son the Hon. Alan Legge Gardner (29 January 1810 – 2 November 1883) and one daughter, the Hon. Charlotte Susannah Gardner (29 December 1810 – 15 August 1859), who married in 1835 Edward Vernon Harbord, 4th Baron Suffield (1813–1853), without issue.

Their children were "Irish twins" (born in the same calendar year, and within twelve months of each other); Lady Gardner died three months later in 1811.

== Legacy ==
Succeeding his father to the family baronies and baronetcy in 1809, Lord Gardner died a widower in 1815, leaving legitimate issue (two young children, for whom Lord Carrington acted as sponsor).

Efforts were made, from 1824, to establish his son's right to sit in the House of Lords, thus ensuring that Henry Fenton Jadis aka Gardner (son of Lord Gardner's first wife), could not claim the peerage title. The subsequent proceedings before the House of Lords Committee for Privileges established in 1825 that Alan Legge Gardner was the 3rd Baron Gardner, and that his (alleged) half-brother was in fact illegitimate. These proceedings heard evidence from domestic servants and also medical practitioners, testifying to the possible lengths of human gestation; the medical evidence also received an eccentric contemporary commentary by Robert Lyall, MD, FLS, with a science-fictional experiment to calculate the exact length of human gestation, which Lyall called the "Experimental Conception Hospital".

== See also ==
- Baron Burghclere

Peerage of Ireland
Preceded by Alan Gardner	Baron Gardner; 1809–1815	Succeeded by Alan Legge Gardner
Peerage of the United Kingdom
Preceded by Alan Gardner	Baron Gardner; 1809–1815	Succeeded by Alan Legge Gardner
Baronetage of Great Britain
Preceded by Alan Gardner	Baronet; 1809–1815	Succeeded by Alan Legge Gardner
