= HMS Heroine (1783) =

Royal Navy fifth-rate frigate

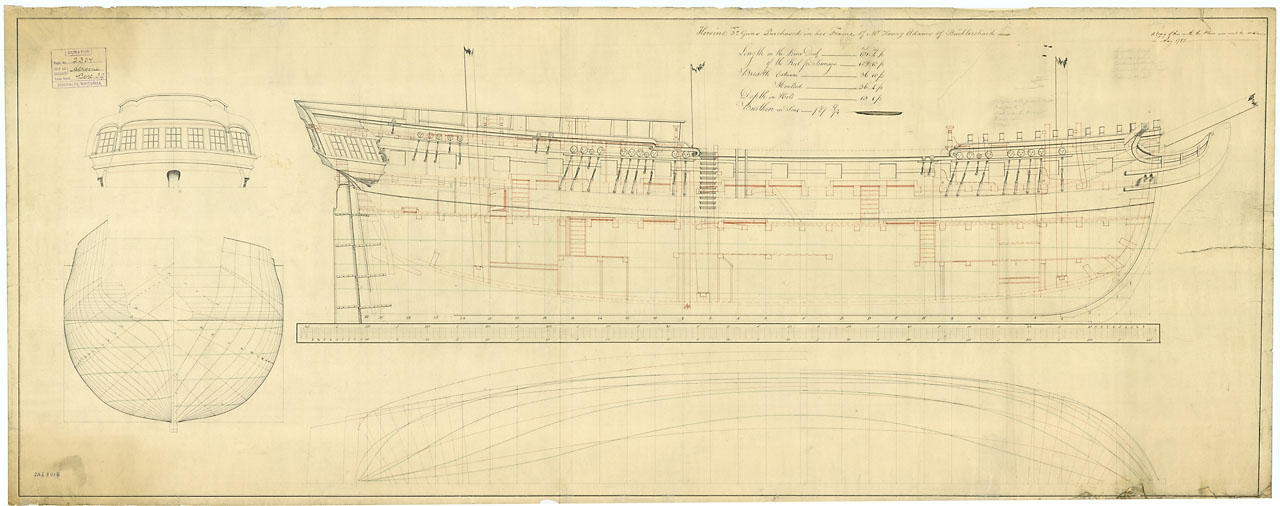
- Lines and profile of Heroine

History

United Kingdom
- Name: Heroine
- Builder: Henry Adams, Bucklers Hard
- Launched: August 1783
- Commissioned: September 1790
- Fate: Sold February 1806

General characteristics
- Class & type: Fifth-rate frigate
- Tons burthen: 77859/94 (bm)
- Length: 130 ft 11 1/2 in (39.9 m) (upper deck); 107 ft 6 3/8 in (32.8 m) (keel)
- Beam: 36 ft 10 3/4 in (11.2 m)
- Draught: 8 ft 8 in (2.6 m) (forward); 13 ft 5 in (4.1 m) (aft)
- Depth of hold: 13 ft (4 m)
- Propulsion: Sails
- Complement: 220
- Armament: UD: 26 × 12-pounder guns; QD: 4 × 6-pounder guns; Fc: 2 × 6-pounder guns

HMS Heroine was a 32-gun frigate of the Royal Navy. Privately built by Henry Adams at Bucklers Hard, she was purchased by the Admiralty before construction was completed in 1783. After activation for the Spanish Armament in 1790, Heroine saw service throughout the French Revolutionary Wars. Having first served in an aborted invasion of Martinique, the frigate joined the East Indies Station in 1794, participating in the Invasion of Ceylon in the following year.

Heroine was converted into a troopship in 1800 and served as such during the Egypt campaign in 1801, participating in the Battle of Abukir. The frigate subsequently served as a floating battery, and when the Napoleonic Wars began in 1803 she was loaned to Trinity House to defend against any French invasion of Britain. This fear dissipated in 1805 after the Battle of Trafalgar, and Heroine was paid off. Worn out, she was sold in 1806.

== Design and construction ==
Heroine was a 12-pounder fifth-rate frigate. (Note: Ships of the Royal Navy were categorised in a rating system. Fifth-rate ships were those holding between thirty and forty-four guns, and usually frigates. They were smaller than fourth-rates, of fifty and sixty guns, but larger than sixth-rates, of twenty to thirty guns.) Frigates were three-masted, full-rigged ships that carried their main battery on a single, continuous gun deck. They were smaller and faster than ships of the line and primarily intended for raiding, reconnaissance and messaging.

With the American Revolutionary War ongoing, by 1778 the frigates of the Royal Navy were greatly outnumbered by those of France, Spain, and Holland. In order to quickly increase the number of frigates at sea, the Admiralty began to accept offers directly from shipbuilders, rather than ordering out to them. The shipbuilder Henry Adams at Bucklers Hard began a private venture to construct a frigate in 1782. The Admiralty, in a decision the naval historian Robert Gardiner describes as "unthinkable under normal circumstances", purchased the ship while the frame was still on the stocks at Bucklers Hard.

The Navy Board took over the design process for the ship, adapting it to naval standards. The frigate was named Heroine on 17 May, the first Royal Navy vessel to go by that name. The ship's figurehead was a woman holding a dagger. She was launched in August 1783 with the following dimensions: 130 feet 11 1/2 inches (39.9 m) along the gun deck, 107 feet 6 3/8 inches (32.8 m) at the keel, with a beam of 36 feet 10 3/4 inches (11.2 m) and a depth in the hold of 13 feet (4 m). Her draught was 8 feet 8 inches (2.6 m) forward and 13 feet 5 inches (4.1 m) aft, and the ship was calculated at 778 59/94 tons burthen. (Note: Gardiner provides a significantly different draught to Winfield; 16 feet 7 inches (5.1 m) forward and 17 feet 9 inches (5.4 m) aft.)

Heroine had a complement of 220 when fully manned. The ship held twenty-six 12-pounder long guns on her upper deck, supported by four 6-pounder long guns on her quarterdeck and a further two 6-pounders on her forecastle. An Admiralty order on 31 January 1793 added six 18-pounder carronades, but did not clarify whether they were placed on the quarterdeck or forecastle.

Heroine was fitted out at Portsmouth Dockyard between 17 August and 11 October 1783. The frigate was not put into service, and between September and August 1784 further work added her copper sheathing and fitted her to go in ordinary at Portsmouth.

=== Characteristics ===
As a private design rather than one ordered by the Admiralty, Heroine was much rounder in shape than other Royal Navy vessels. While fitting out was completed to the standards of the Navy Board, Gardiner argues that the carronade gun ports on the frigate appear to have been an after-thought. Despite her unique design, Heroine was the match of other frigates of her type in performance, and had better freeboard. She could reach a speed of 12 1/2 knots (14.4 mph) and was recorded in her sailing reports as being weatherly, sailing and handling comfortably.

== Service ==
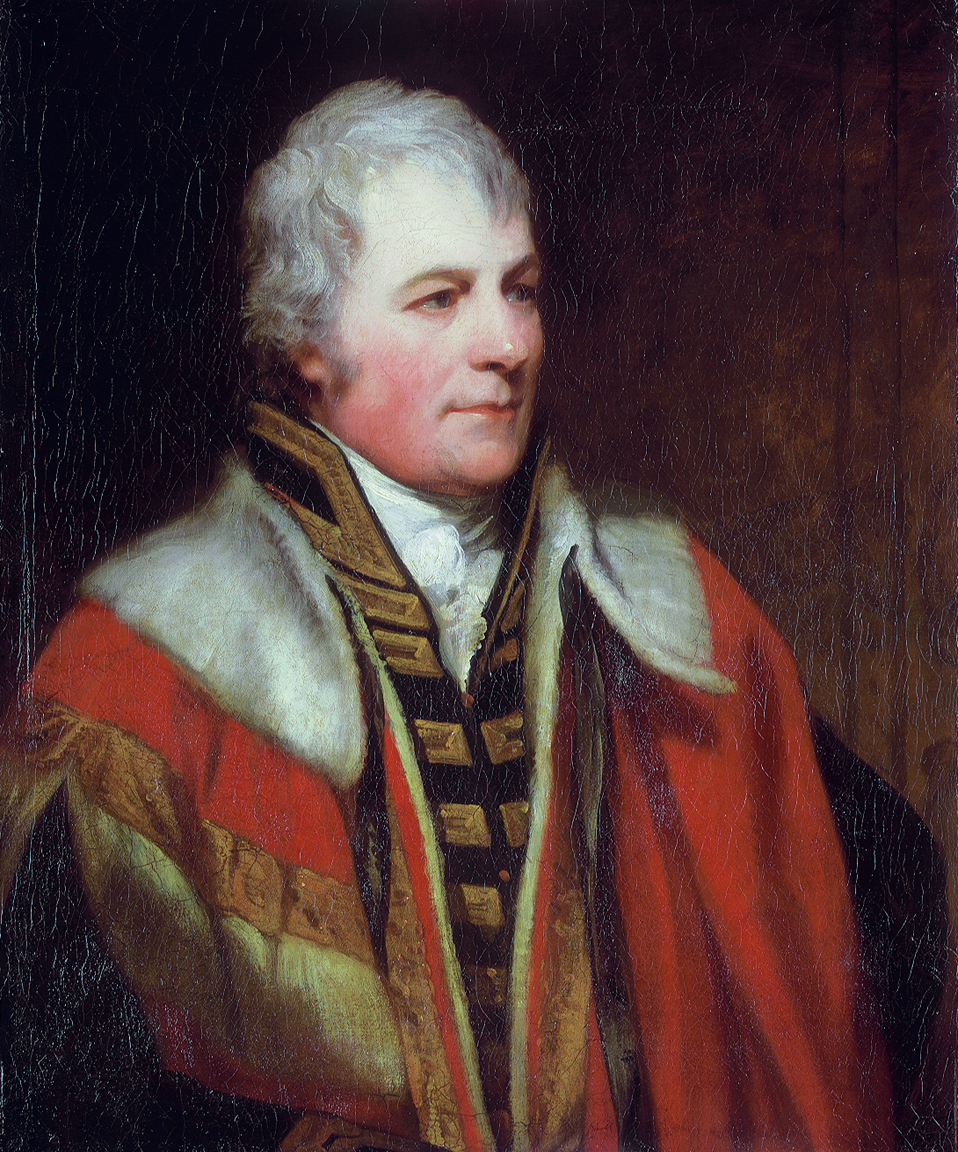
William Carnegie, Lord Rosehill, was Heroine's first commander

Heroine was first commissioned in September 1790 by Captain Lord Rosehill as part of the response to the Spanish Armament. With war with Spain a possibility over ownership of Nootka Sound, the frigate joined a fleet sailing in the English Channel. The controversy over ownership of Nootka Sound continued for several months until Spain renounced possession.

=== French Revolutionary Wars ===
At the start of the French Revolutionary Wars in 1793, Heroine was one of the two largest of the forty-four, 32-gun frigates available to the Royal Navy. (Note: The other was HMS Aimable.) The frigate was recommissioned in January under the command of Captain Alan Gardner, but stayed in Portsmouth until 14 March while repairs were completed. On 25 March Heroine was part of a squadron under the command of Gardner's father, Rear-Admiral Alan Gardner, which sailed to the West Indies to protect the British islands there. There the squadron embarked 1,100 soldiers at Barbados for an attack on French Martinique. They departed on 10 June and by 19 June had landed at Case-Navire, but the attack on land failed and the soldiers re-embarked. The squadron left for Barbados on 22 June, and returned to Britain in the autumn. Heroine continued in Gardner's squadron, now attached to the Channel Fleet, and was still serving in it in December.

Heroine subsequently joined the East Indies Station, and by 11 September 1794, was at Madras with the rest of that squadron. On 5 February 1795, the ship was sent from Madras alongside the 44-gun ship HMS Diomede to protect merchant traffic in the Straits of Malacca, between Malacca and Bangka Island. The two ships had returned to Madras by 21 July, when they sailed again as part of an expedition to invade Ceylon in order to stop it being occupied by the French. Split into two groups, Heroine was part of the larger force sent to Trincomalee, while another attacked Malacca. Heroine was detached from the other vessels later in July to sail to Colombo, where the governor of Dutch Ceylon, Johan van Angelbeek, resided. There she landed Major Patrick Agnew who obtained a letter of support from Angelbeek for the taking of Trincomalee, based on an order from William V, Prince of Orange. Heroine re-joined the invasion force on 31 July, and on the following day they arrived in Back Bay, off Trincomalee.

The communications from Prince William and Angelbeek were passed over to the commandant of Trincomalee, but he found issue with the wording of the order. Having argued over whether access would be provided for two days, the British attacked on 2 August. Diomede attempted to navigate the bay but was wrecked in doing so, causing another delay before the landings were undertaken on 3 August. Heroine was sent in close to the shore, and covered the soldiers with her broadside as they landed without opposition. Besieging the town, Fort Fredrick surrendered on 26 August. The garrison was taken on board a transport and on 30 August Heroine sailed as escort to the ship as it conveyed the Dutch to Madras. The final holdout, Fort Ostenburg, surrendered on 31 August.

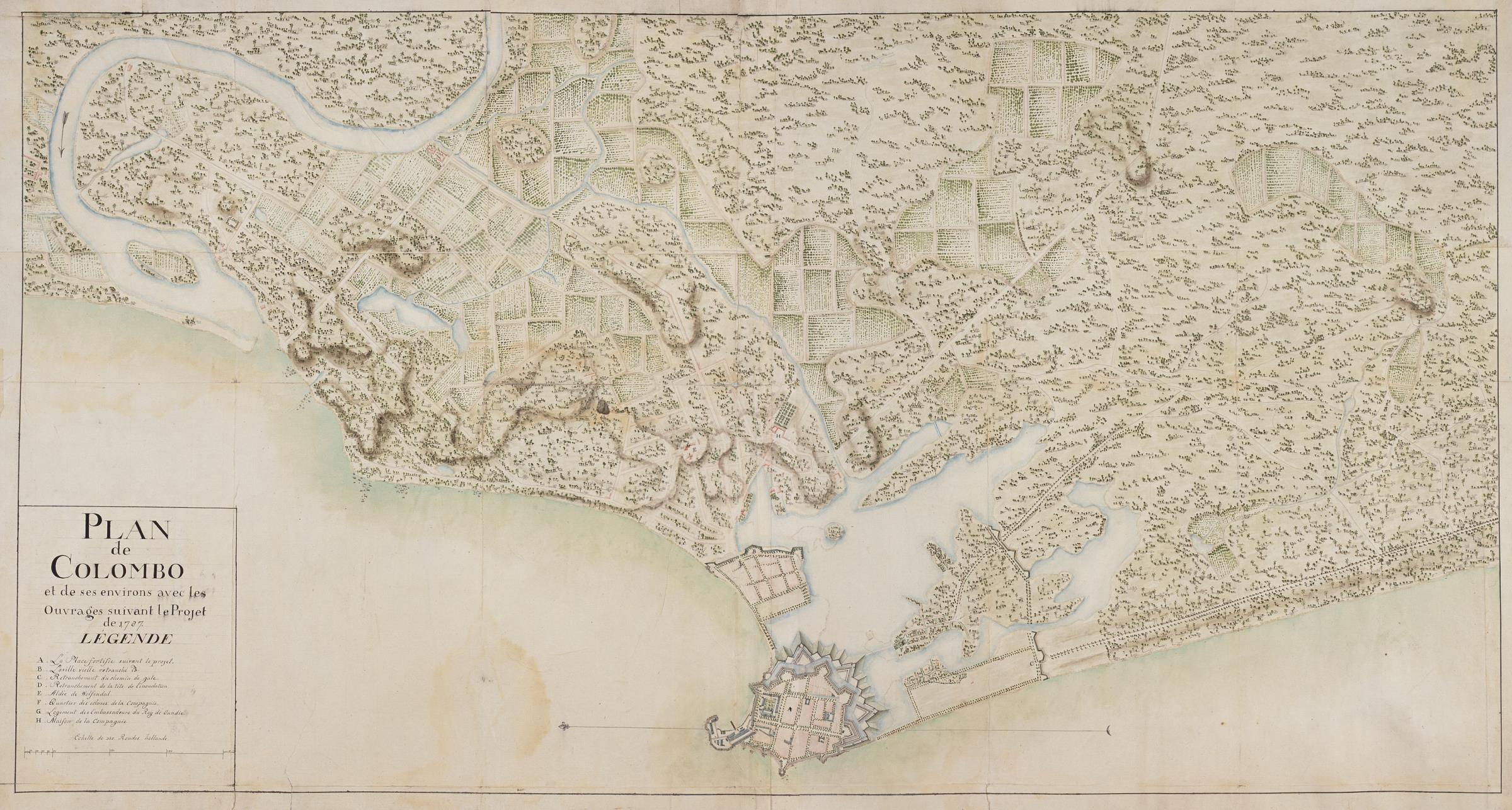
Colombo, captured by Heroine's blockading force in 1796

The invasion force returned to Madras on 21 September. The majority of the East Indies squadron then sailed again to attack the Spice Islands. Heroine was ordered to remain behind to blockade Colombo, the final Dutch holdout on Ceylon. For this task she was joined by ships from the Bombay Marine; the 32-gun frigate HCS Bombay and 18-gun sloop HCS Swift. The blockade was still running when, on 15 January 1796, it was supplemented by the 16-gun sloops HMS Echo and HMS Rattlesnake, and a transport, from the Cape of Good Hope Station. Gardner commanded the force. Heroine, Echo, and Rattlesnake escorted a fleet of troop transports to Negombo on 5 February. Capturing the port, the soldiers travelled overland to surround Colombo, while Gardner's ships closed in from the sea. The city finally surrendered to Gardner on 15 February. This resulted in £300,000 (equivalent to £29,330,498 in 2025) of prize money for the blockaders. In September Heroine and the 32-gun frigate HMS Orpheus were damaged by storms in the Bay of Bengal, requiring two frigates from the Cape of Good Hope Station to be transferred across to take on their duties.

By February 1797, Heroine was sailing with the majority of the East Indies squadron, under the command of Rear-Admiral Peter Rainier, off the Coromandel Coast. The ships were kept together in expectation of the start of the Anglo-Spanish War. After April Gardner left Heroine to return to Britain and was replaced in command by Captain John Murray. With war declared, Rainier prepared to attack Manila. As part of this Heroine escorted transports from Calcutta to Penang, the invasion rendezvous, on 9 August. She was placed in the larboard division of the squadron for the attack, tasked with repeating signals between the ships in any engagement. (Note: Repeating frigates stationed out of the line of battle mirrored the flag signals sent out by their admirals so that messages could be more easily spread throughout the fleet.) The attack was suddenly cancelled on 28 August when Rainier learned of the signing of the Peace of Leoben, in which Britain's Austrian allies stopped fighting France, leaving that nation free to attack while India was vulnerable with the navy absent at Penang.

Rainer redistributed his forces to defend against any French incursions. Heroine was sent with Orpheus to patrol the Sandheads, part of the Bay of Bengal, in around September. After this, Murray was ordered to take Heroine back to Britain by Rear-Admiral Sir Hugh Christian, the commander of the Cape of Good Hope Station. Christian was not in Murray's chain of command but he acceded to the order and left the East Indies Station without informing Rainier, who according to the naval historian C. Northcote Parkinson was left "almost speechless with indignation". Heroine arrived at Portsmouth on 10 July 1798, having on board Lord Hobart, the previous governor of Madras, and several other passengers. The frigate was paid off in August.

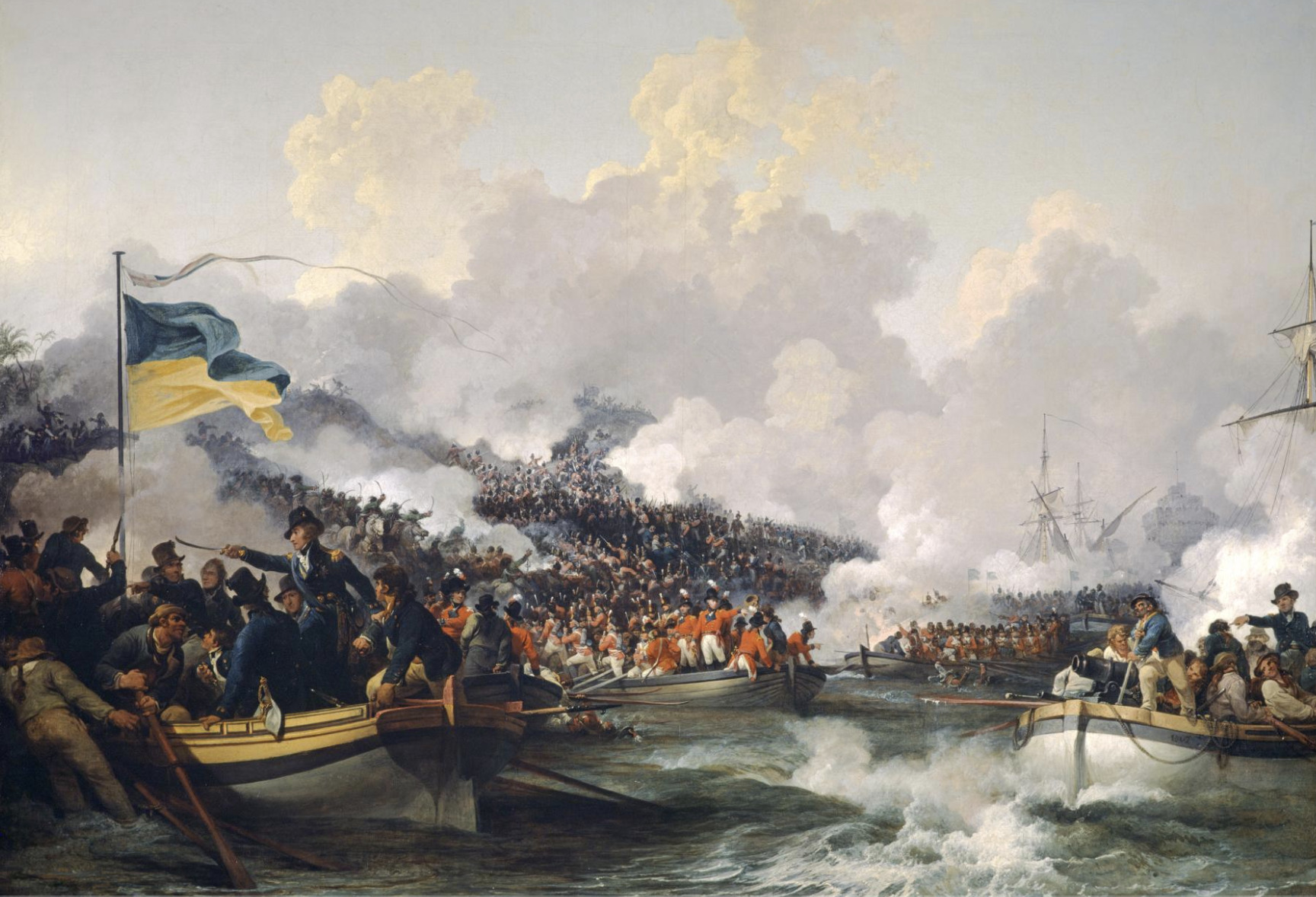
Heroine participated in the landings at the Battle of Abukir in 1801

Rainier demanded that Murray be court-martialled for desertion: "The Honourable John Murray in H.M.S. Heroine has deserted the Station totally, without any authority from me". The First Lord of the Admiralty, Lord Spencer, undertook an enquiry into the situation and chose to take no action.

At Portsmouth Heroine was refitted to become a troopship between February and March 1800, being re-rated as a 16-gun ship, en flute. She was recommissioned in February under the orders of Commander John Hill. In this new role Heroine participated in the Egypt campaign in 1801, conveying a section of the 23rd Regiment of Foot. On 8 March Heroine was part of the fleet at Abu Qir which participated in the landings for the Battle of Abukir, in which the 23rd formed part of the reserve force for the attack. One seaman from Heroine was wounded in the battle. The ship was still serving with the expedition on 10 June when she shared in the capture of a French ship off Alexandria.

=== Napoleonic Wars ===
Heroine was used as a floating battery in 1802. The Treaty of Amiens expired on 18 May 1803, beginning the Napoleonic Wars. There was a public fear that the French would soon launch an invasion of Britain. The lighthouse and navigation corporation Trinity House volunteered to equip ten out-of-service frigates to defend the River Thames. Laid up at Deptford Dockyard because of difficulties in finding a crew to man her, Heroine was selected as one of these vessels. After a refit at Deptford she was delivered to Trinity House alongside HMS Vestal, HMS Iris, and HMS Unite, on 12 October.

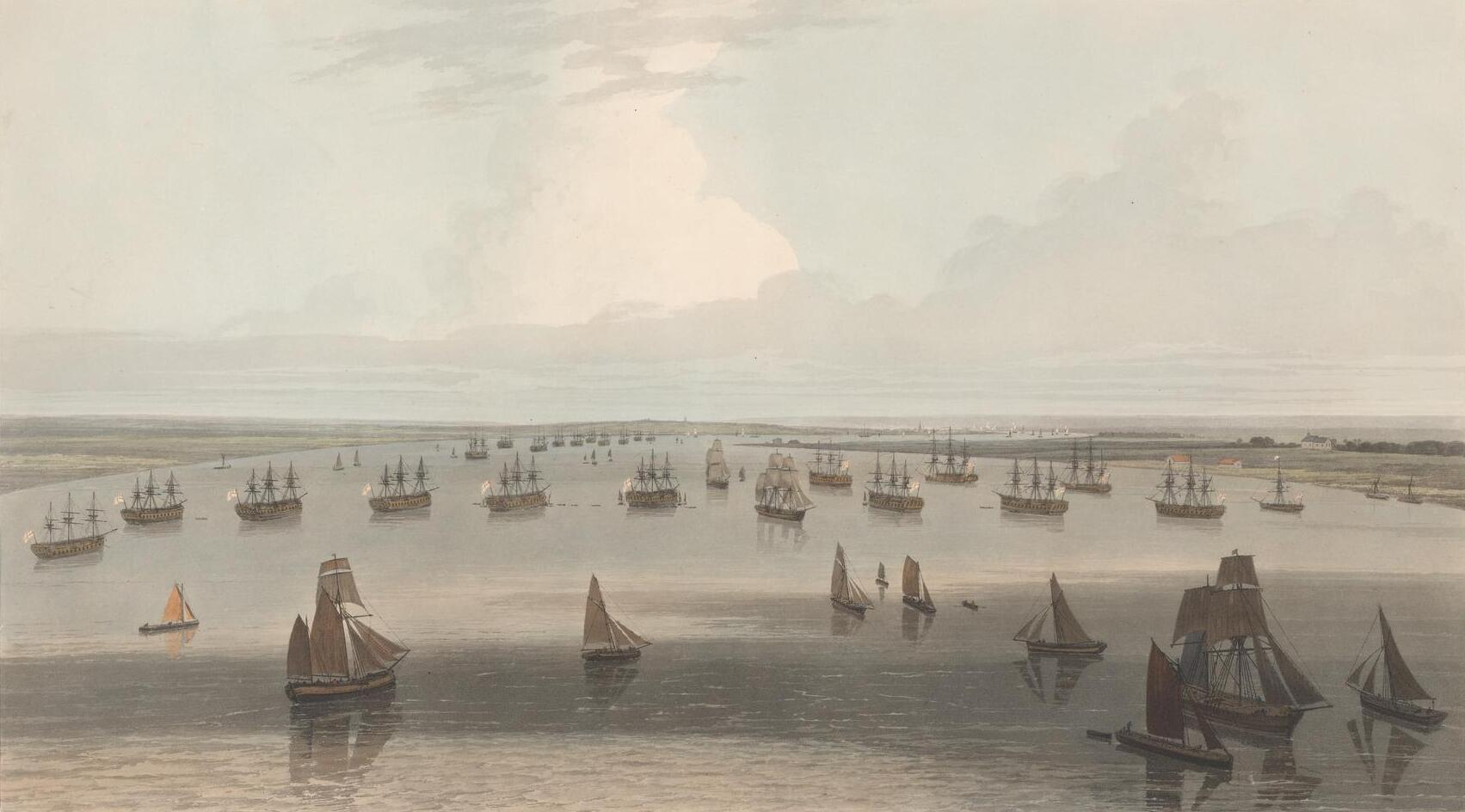
The Trinity House frigates in the Thames Estuary, 1804; Heroine is fifth from the left in the line

Manned by 600 men from the newly formed Royal Trinity House Volunteer Artillery (RTHVA), the ships were stationed off Gravesend and were later joined by six other frigates. They were organised in a cordon between Kent and Essex, tied to moorings and only partially rigged. The deputy master of Trinity House, Joseph Cotton, commanded the force as a lieutenant-colonel. He was stationed on Heroine, serving as her joint commander alongside another Trinity House member, Captain R. Lewin. Each ship had a complement of about 120. As they were merchant sailors, it was agreed that if there was a need to go into action, command of the ships would be given over to two naval captains who were stationed at Lower Hope on board HMY Royal Charlotte. The plan was that when attacked, the ships would block the mouth of the Thames, swinging themselves broadside-on towards the French.

The British victory at the Battle of Trafalgar on 21 October 1805 ended the invasion scare; Trinity House soon disbanded the RTHVA and paid off the frigates. Worn out, Heroine was put up for sale at Woolwich Dockyard on 17 February 1806 and sold in the same month.
