= Curtis baronets of Gatcombe (1794) =

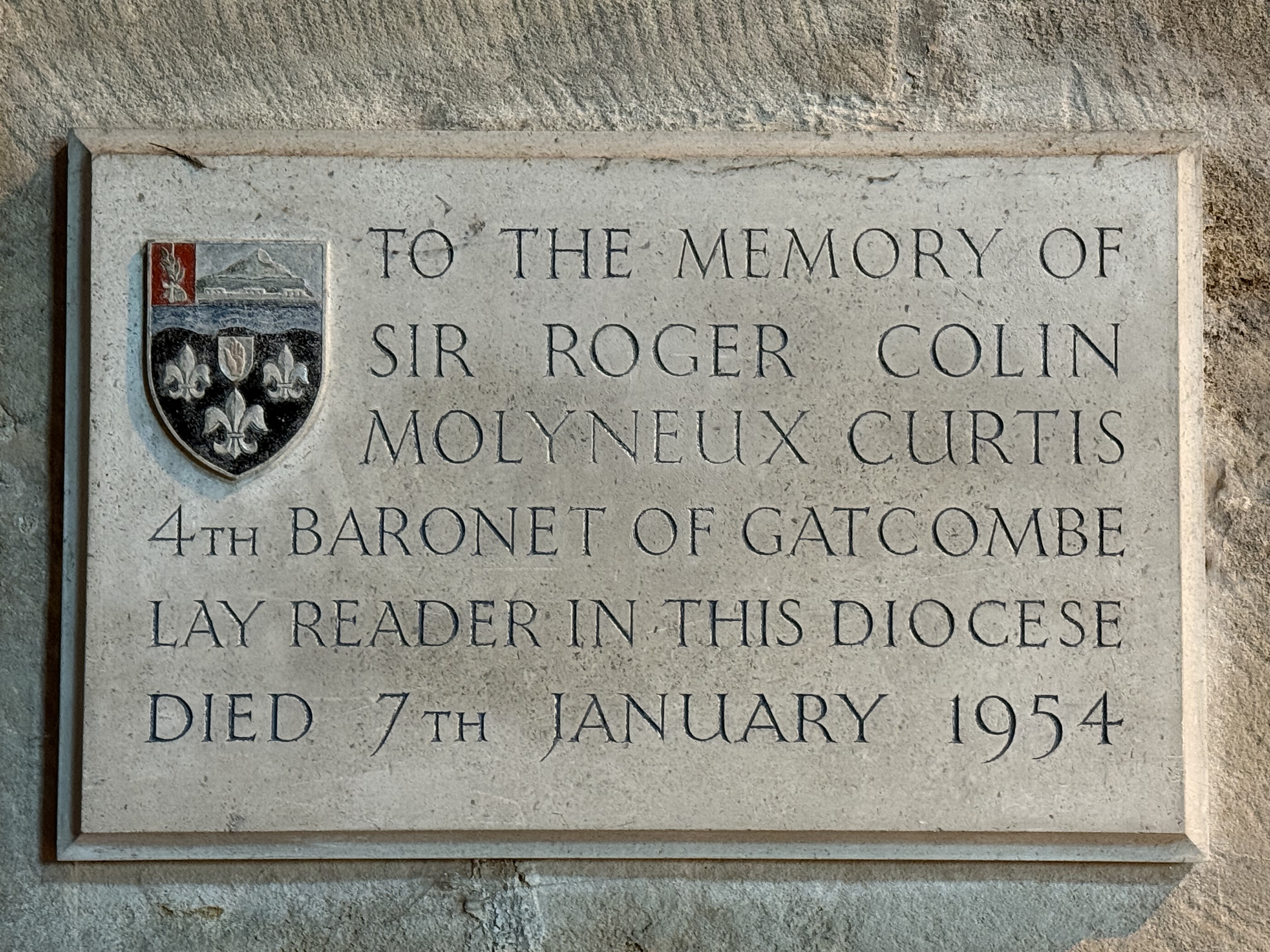
Memorial to Sir Roger Colin Molyneux Curtis, Baronet of Gatcome in St Michael with St Mary's Church, Melbourne

The Curtis baronetcy, of Gatcombe in the County of Southampton, was created in the Baronetage of Great Britain on 10 September 1794 for the naval commander Admiral Sir Roger Curtis, 1st Baronet. The title became extinct on the death of the fourth Baronet in 1954.

== Curtis baronets, of Gatcombe (1794) ==
- Sir Roger Curtis, 1st Baronet (died 1816)
- Sir Lucius Curtis, 2nd Baronet (1786–1869)
- Sir Arthur Colin Curtis, 3rd Baronet (1858–1898)
- Sir Roger Colin Molyneux Curtis, 4th Baronet (1886–1954)

== Coat of arms ==
Coat of arms of Curtis baronets of Gatcombe
Crest Out of a naval coronet Or an arm embowed vested Azure cuffed Argent the hand proper supporting a staff thereon a flag flowing to the dexter charged with a wolf's head Or on a canton per saltire Gules and Azure a cross Argent all within a bordure Or. Escutcheon Per fesse wavy Argent and Sable in chief a rock (alluding to Gibraltar) in base three Fleurs-de-lis of the first on a canton Gules a sword erect proper pommel and hilt or entwined with a palm branch also proper. Motto Per ardua (Through difficulty)

== Notes ==
Baronetage of Great Britain
Preceded by Gardner baronets	Curtis baronets of Gatcombe; 10 September 1794	Succeeded by Sanderson baronets
