= HMS Mermaid (1749) =

Frigate of the Royal Navy

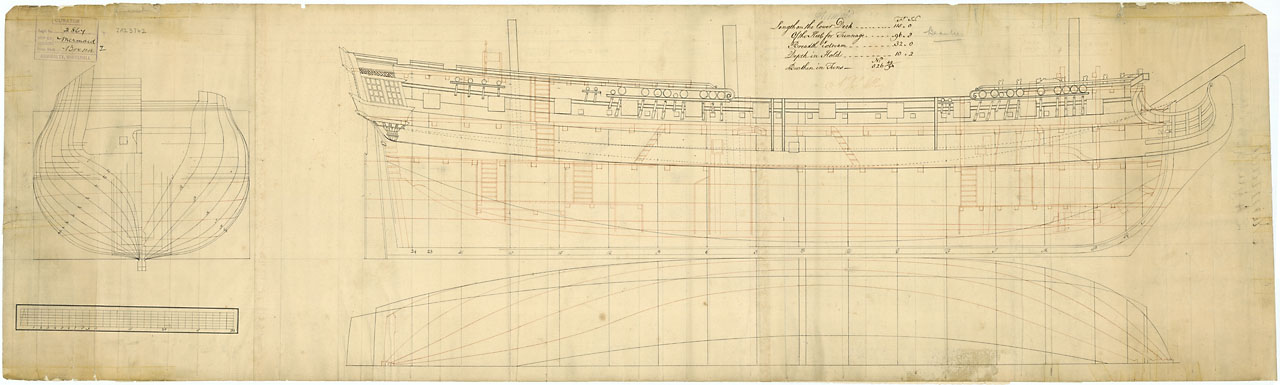
- Mermaid

History

Great Britain
- Name: HMS Mermaid
- Ordered: 4 February 1748
- Builder: Henry Adams, Bucklers Hard
- Laid down: 2 April 1748
- Launched: 22 May 1749
- Commissioned: June 1749
- Fate: Bilged and abandoned on 6 January 1760

General characteristics
- Class & type: Sixth-rate post ship
- Tons burthen: 533 tons
- Length: 114 ft 10.5 in (35.014 m) (overall); 96 ft 10 in (29.51 m) (keel)
- Beam: 32 ft 2 in (9.80 m)
- Depth of hold: 10 ft 2.5 in (3.112 m)
- Sail plan: Full-rigged ship
- Complement: 160
- Armament: Upper deck: 22 × 9 pdrs; Quarter deck: 2 × 3 pdrs

HMS Mermaid was a 24-gun sixth-rate post ship of the Royal Navy, built in 1748–49, which served in the Seven Years' War.

== Construction and commissioning ==
Mermaid was ordered on 4 February 1748, with the contract being awarded to Henry Adams, of Bucklers Hard, with the keel being laid on 2 April. She was built to a design by the Surveyor of the Navy Joseph Allin, named Mermaid on 6 December, launched on 22 May 1749 and completed on 7 August 1749 at Portsmouth Dockyard, having cost £4,211.16.7d to build, and with a further £3,829.3.11d spent on fitting her out.

== Career ==
Her first commander was Captain John Montagu, who commissioned her in June 1749, and sailed her to New York in August 1749. Montagu was succeeded by Captain Edward Keller in 1750, then later that year by Captain Elias Bate. On 15 September 1752, she was driven ashore in a hurricane at Charles Town, South Carolina, British America. In 1753, command was taken by Captain John Hollwall. Mermaid served this first commission in North American and Caribbean waters, and was decommissioned in July 1753. She refitted and underwent repairs over the next few months, and recommissioned in January 1754 under Captain Washington Shirley, sailing for New England in July 1754. Captain Alexander Innes took command in 1756, and was succeeded by Captain James Hackman in 1758. She bilged on a sandbank off Big Grand Cay in the Bahamas on 4 December 1759 and was abandoned as a wreck on 6 January 1760.
