= John Hill (Royal Navy officer) =

Royal Navy officer

Rear-Admiral Sir John Hill
- Born: c.1774
- Died: 20 January 1855, age 81 Walmer Lodge, Deal, Kent
- Allegiance: United Kingdom
- Branch: Royal Navy
- Service years: 1781–1855
- Rank: Rear-Admiral
- Commands: HMS Heroine
- Conflicts: American Revolutionary War; French Revolutionary Wars; Battle of the Nile; Napoleonic Wars
- Awards: Knight Bachelor

Rear-Admiral Sir John Hill (c.1774 – 20 January 1855) was an officer of the Royal Navy who served during the American War of Independence, and the French Revolutionary and Napoleonic Wars.

Hill entered the navy at a young age, probably after a period of being nominally on naval ships in order to gain seniority. He served on several ships during the years of peace between the end of the American War of Independence and the start of the French Revolutionary Wars, and was promoted to lieutenant shortly after the outbreak of the latter conflict. He served in the English Channel and the Mediterranean, and was one of the officers of HMS Minotaur at the Battle of the Nile in 1798. He was promoted to commander for his good service in the battle, but only commanded one ship, the troopship HMS Heroine, before the Peace of Amiens.

He distinguished himself in the service of the Transport Board during the Napoleonic Wars, overseeing the movement of troops to and from continental Europe and earning the thanks of Swedish royalty and the Duke of Wellington. Advanced to post-captain, he continued in this role for some years after the end of the Napoleonic Wars, until being appointed Captain-Superintendent of Deptford Victualling Yard. The remainder of his career was spent ashore at the navy's dockyards, moving to Sheerness Dockyard and then back to Deptford. He was knighted for his services in 1831, and while at Sheerness in 1838, oversaw preparations for selling HMS Temeraire. He retired in 1851 with the rank of rear-admiral and died in 1855.

== Early life ==
Hill was born c. 1774 and joined the navy on 25 September 1781, being entered on the books of the bomb vessel HMS Infernal as a first-class volunteer under Commander James Alms.^{[a]} His name was borne on Infernal's books until March 1783.^{[b]} From 20 April 1788 he served aboard the 16-gun HMS Nautilus at Newfoundland under Commander Thomas Thompson, and from 1789 went on to serve aboard several ships of the line.^{[c]} He held the ranks of master's mate, and later midshipman, aboard the 74-gun ships HMS Goliath, Captain Archibald Dickson, and HMS Bedford, Captain Robert Mann, and the 24-gun HMS Proserpine, Captain James Alms, seeing service in the English Channel and in the West Indies.^{[d]} Hill was promoted to lieutenant on 28 July 1794 and was at first posted to the 74-gun HMS Invincible, serving with the Channel Fleet under Captain Hon. Thomas Pakenham. Hill followed Pakenham to his next command the following year, the 80-gun HMS Juste, and spent a brief period in 1797 serving under his old commander, James Alms, aboard the 64-gun HMS Repulse.

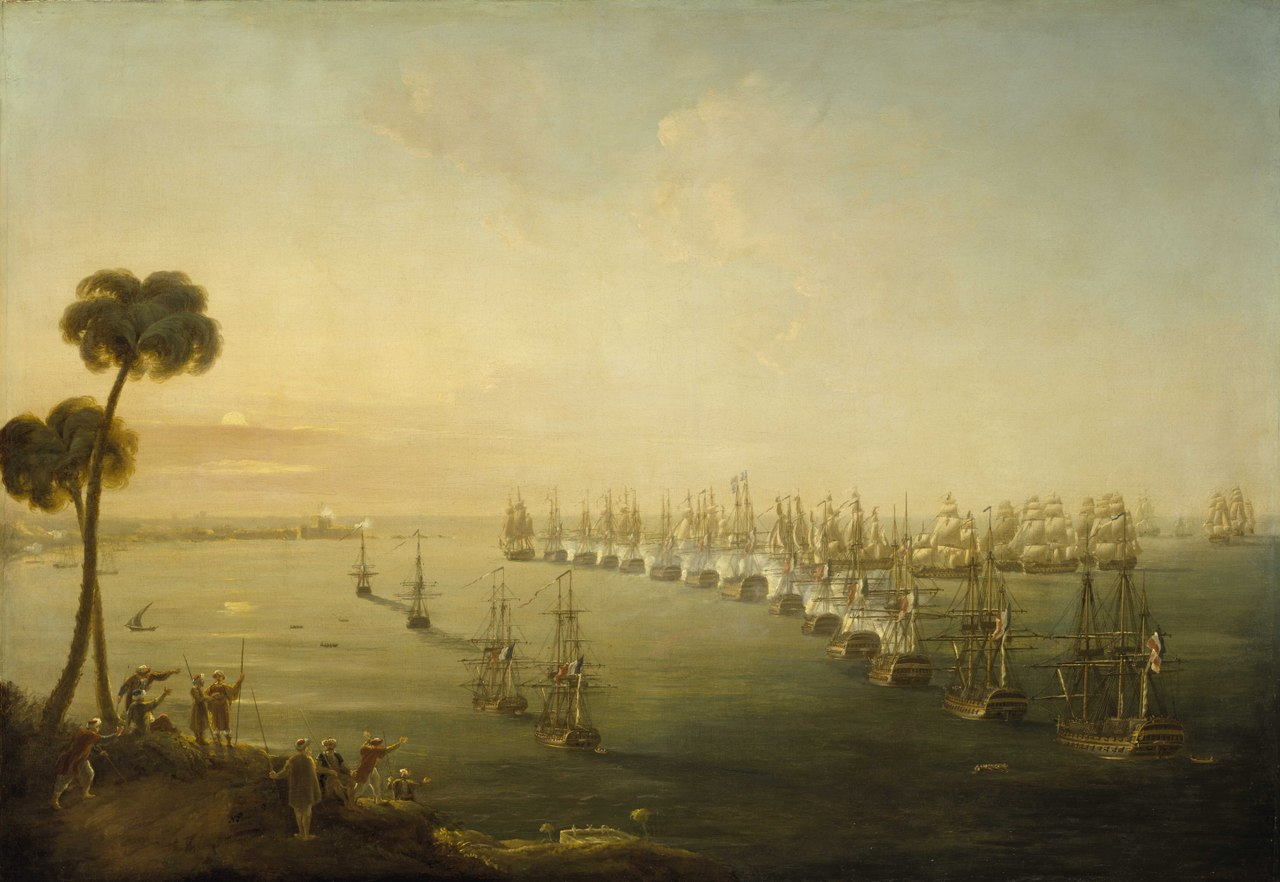
The Battle of the Nile, depicted in an 1808 painting by Nicholas Pocock

Hill then went out to the Mediterranean aboard the 98-gun HMS Princess Royal, the flagship of Sir John Orde. He transferred to the 74-gun HMS Minotaur under Captain Thomas Louis in May 1798, and served as her senior lieutenant at the Battle of the Nile in early August that year. His good service in the battle led to a commission to the rank of commander, dated 8 October 1798. He was for some time without a command, until being appointed to take over HMS Heroine on 2 February 1800.

== Command ==
Heroine was a former 32-gun fifth rate frigate, but had been reduced to 16 guns and converted to carry troops. He went out with her to the Mediterranean and supported the Egyptian campaign between 1800 and 6 March 1802, when he relinquished command. Hill did not receive any commands during the drawdown of the navy during the Peace of Amiens, but returned to service after the resumption of the wars, with an appointment to the hired 16-gun sloop Humber, in the Channel between 31 March 1804 and 27 October 1808.

Hill saw limited opportunities for service after the expiration of this posting, and it was not until 23 March 1813 that he received another appointment, as an Agent for Transports. He had responsibilities for this in the Baltic and off the French and Dutch coasts for the next six years, being promoted to post captain on 28 October 1815. A summary of his services reported that while in the transport service, he had embarked and disembarked the Swedish Army from Sweden to Pomerania, earning the thanks of Charles XIV John of Sweden. Hill had also been principal agent for transports under General Thomas Graham, 1st Baron Lynedoch, and oversaw the transport of troops prior to the Battle of Waterloo, earning the thanks of Arthur Wellesley, 1st Duke of Wellington, and his support for his promotion to post-captain. Hill remained in Europe for several years, based at Calais, and overseeing the transport of troops, wounded soldiers, and prisoners of war.

== Shore appointments and later life ==
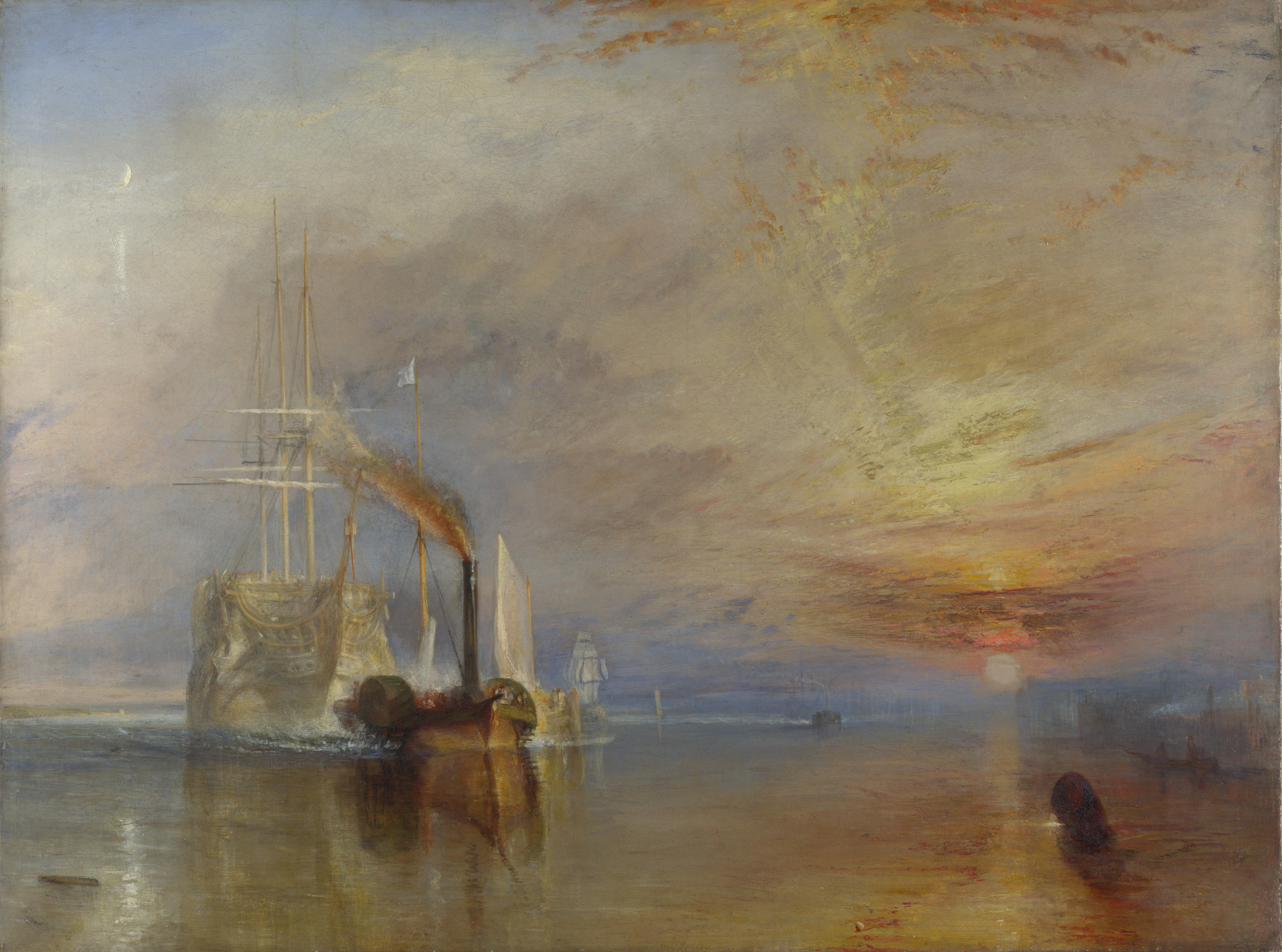
The Fighting Temeraire tugged to her last Berth to be broken up, 1838, by J. M. W. Turner. Hill oversaw her preparation for her sale and disposal, which included the removal of her masts. Turner used artistic license in his painting, in depicting her with masts.

Following on from his transport duties, Hill was made Captain-Superintendent of Deptford Victualling Yard in 1820, holding the post until 1838. He was made a comptroller in 1822, and a patent commissioner in 1826, followed by captain-superintendent in 1832.

Hill was knighted by King William IV on 31 August 1831. From Deptford Hill was moved to be Superintendent at Sheerness Dockyard on 9 March 1838, where he remained until returning to Deptford as superintendent of the dockyard on 11 December 1841. While at Sheerness he was nominally captain of the 98-gun HMS Ocean, where in mid-1838 he received orders from the captain-superintendent, Thomas Fortescue Kennedy, to have HMS Temeraire, then serving as the "Guardship of the Ordinary and Captain-Superintendent's ship of the Fleet Reserve in the Medway", prepared for sale and disposal. Hill oversaw the removal of Temeraire's masts, stores and guns, and the paying off of her crew. Temeraire's final voyage to the breaker's yard was painted by J. M. W. Turner as The Fighting Temeraire.

Hill remained at Deptford until his promotion to rear-admiral in 1851. He had been granted a pension of £150 a year by Parliament, to be paid after his retirement, for "...special services ... superintending the relief granted in times of scarcity in Ireland and in Scotland..." Hill was reported to have married and to have at least one son, who became a colonel in the British Army, and a daughter, who married the naval officer Captain William Langford Castle in 1835, but died in 1837. Rear-Admiral Sir John Hill died at Walmer Lodge, Deal, Kent on 20 January 1855, at the age of 81. He left an estate valued at around £80,000.

== See also ==
- O'Byrne, William Richard (1849). "Hill, John" . A Naval Biographical Dictionary . John Murray – via Wikisource.

== Notes ==
a. Died a vice-admiral of the red in 1816, also written as 'James Almes'. Not to be confused with James Alms (1728–1791).

b. Hardwicke's Annual Biography states that Hill entered the navy aboard a ship named Imperial. No ship of this name was in service at this time, and presumably Imperial is a mistake for Infernal, attested to in O'Byrne.

c. Hill would have been aged around seven at the time of his entry into Infernal. It may be that this was a titular posting only, and he did not actually physically serve until some years later, likely at the time of his assignment to Nautilus in 1788. The Gentleman's Magazine's obituary for Hill states he joined Nautilus in April 1783, omitting this gap in his service. There was no Nautilus in service at this time, the previous sloop of that name having been sold in 1780, and the later ship was not launched until January 1784. Moreover, Thompson did not take command of Nautilus until 1786.

d. Both O'Byrne and The Gentleman's Magazine list HMS Porcupine, a similarly named sixth rate, instead of Proserpine. Porcupine at this time was off Scotland under the command of Captain George Martin, and began a refit in Plymouth in November 1791. Proserpine was under James Alms from May 1791, and went out to Jamaica in August that year.
