= Alexander Innes =

18th c Royal Naval Officer

Rear-Admiral Alexander Innes
- Died: 1786
- Military career
- Allegiance: Kingdom of Great Britain
- Branch: Royal Navy
- Rank: Rear-Admiral
- Commands: HMS Mermaid; HMS Enterprise; HMS Hampton Court; HMS Queen; Jamaica Station
- Conflicts: Anglo-Spanish War

Rear-Admiral Alexander Innes (died 1786) was a Royal Navy officer who became Commander-in-Chief of the Jamaica Station.

== Naval career ==
Promoted to post captain on 25 June 1756, Innes was given command of the sixth-rate HMS Mermaid in 1756. He then took command of the fourth-rate HMS Enterprise in 1758 and of the third-rate HMS Hampton Court in 1762 and took part in the Battle of Havana in summer of that year during the Anglo-Spanish War. After that he was then given command of the second-rate HMS Queen in 1778. He went on to be Commander-in-Chief of the Jamaica Station with his flag in the 50-gun HMS Europa in 1786 but died in office.

== Sources ==
- Cundall, Frank (1915). Historic Jamaica. West India Committee.
- Winfield, Rif (2007). British Warships in the Age of Sail, 1714 to 1792. Seaforth Publishing, London. ISBN 978-1-84415-700-6.

Military offices
Preceded by Alan Gardner	Commander-in-Chief, Jamaica Station; 1786	Succeeded by Alan Gardner
