= William Linnæus Gardner =

British military officer in India (1770–1835)

- Born: 1770; Livingston Manor, New York
- Died: 1835 (aged 64–65); Kasganj, British India
- Occupation: Lieutenant colonel
- Known for: Raising Gardner's Horse, initially for police and revenue duties
- Spouse(s): Begum Dehlmi, Nawab Mah Manzeil-ul-Nisa (Indian princess) (m. 1796–1835, his death)

William Linnæus Gardner (1770 – 1835) was a Bengal Army officer known for raising 2nd Lancers (Gardner's Horse) in 1809 and for his marriage to a Muslim Indian princess.

== Early life and family ==
William Linnaeus Gardner was born in 1770 to a prominent Loyalist family in New York's Hudson Valley. He was the eldest son of Major Valentine Gardner (born 1739 in Ireland), 16th Foot. His father Major Valentine Gardner was the elder brother of Alan Gardner, 1st Baron Gardner and was with the 16th Regiment of Foot, during its service in America from 1767 to 1782. Gardner's mother was his father's first wife, Aleda (1747–1791), third daughter of Colonel Robert Livingston of Livingston Manor, New York (where he was born).

Gardner "... is mentioned as being cared for by his maternal grandfather at the... manor house for several years before it was judged prudent to send him to his father, with whom he ended up back in England – an involuntary intercontinental emigration in reverse". Through his father, he had a younger half-brother, also named Valentine Gardner, whose mother his father later married. He was brought up in France and when a boy, was gazetted as ensign in the old 89th Foot on 7 March 1783 and placed on half-pay of the regiment on its disbandment some weeks later. He was brought on full-pay as ensign in the 74th Highlanders in India on 6 March 1789, and promoted to a lieutenancy in the 52nd Foot in India in October of the same year. The regimental muster-rolls, which are incomplete, show him on the strength of the depôt-company at home from 1791 to 1793. He became captain in the 30th Foot in 1794 and at once exchanged to half-pay of a disbanded independent company. Of the circumstances under which he retired various stories were told. All that is known is that he appeared afterwards as a military adventurer in the "chaotic field of central Indian discord".

== Marriage and children ==
For some time (starting in 1798), Gardner was in the service of Jeswunt Rao Holkar, the famous Maratha ruler of Indore. Holkar sent him on a mission to the independent princes of Cambay, where Gardner converted to Islam and married his only wife, an Indian Muslim princess (born c. 1775), on whose ancestors the emperors of Delhi, in days gone by, had conferred the highest hereditary honours.

Sources are conflicting on their date of marriage (with some citing marriage in 1788 when the Begum was 13 years old and others stating that they married in 1796). On seeing his future wife, Begum Mah Munzel ul-Nissa, for the first time, he stated: "... I saw, as I thought, the most beautiful black eyes in the world." She was the daughter of the Nawab of Cambay and the adopted daughter of Akbar Shah II, the Mughal Emperor of India. On living at his wife's estates at Khassgunge, he wrote in a letter to his cousin Edward: "At Khassgunge I anticipate very great happiness. I am fond of reading and I am fond of my garden and... have more relish in playing with [my] little brats than for the First Society in the World." Together they had three children: two sons named Alan Hyde Gardner (whose younger daughter married a Mughal prince named Mirza Anjum Shikoh Bahadur) and James Valentine Gardner (who married a Mughal princess named Begum Mulka Humanee), as well as a daughter.

The memoirs of Fanny Parkes, a contemporary of Gardner's who spent time with the family in February 1835, offers unique insight into the family's multicultural daily life. Parkes writes of the household's mix of Mughal and European traditions and practices. Parkes' book Wanderings of a Pilgrim in search of the Pictureseque During four and twenty years in the East with revelations of Life in the Zenana (1850) was rediscovered and edited by William Dalrymple and published for contemporary audiences as Begums, Thugs & Englishmen, The Journals of Fanny Parkes (Penguin).

== Adventures ==
Holkar afterwards sent Gardner to meet with Lord Lake and suspecting treachery, grossly insulted him on his return. Gardner replied by attempting to cut down the Maharaja. Failing, he escaped in the confusion and went through a succession of the wildest adventures. At one time, when a prisoner of Amrit Rao, he was strapped to a gun under the threat of death unless he promised to fight against the English. At another time, he jumped down a precipice fifty feet deep into a stream to escape his guards. Eventually, he made his way into Lake's camp in the guise of a grass-cutter (1804). His wife and her attendants were allowed to depart unharmed from Holkar's camp through her family's influence.

== Military life ==
In 1809 Gardner raised a body of horse to carry out police and revenue duties and originally it was styled Lieutenant Colonel Gardner's Horse. In 1817 when it became a corps of Irregular Horse, the police and revenue aspect being dropped, and was renamed Lieutenant Colonel Gardner's Corps of Irregular Horse. Gardner's Horse, which has had name changes over the years, is one of the most highly decorated regiments of the Indian Army, first seeing service during the Nepal War (1814-1816).

Gardner had served as a leader of irregular horse (captain) under Lake and in the same capacity (lieutenant-colonel), performed services under Sir David Ochterlony in Kaman from 1814 to 1815. In the latter connection, Gardner (whose name, like that of his father, is spelt 'Gardiner' in many army lists), has been confounded by some writers with the first British resident in Nepal, the Hon. Edward Gardiner, who was affiliated with the Bengal Civil Service (for reference see Debrett, Peerage, 1825, under 'Blessington,’ and Dodwell and Miles, Lists of Bengal Civil Servants). Gardner also rendered service under Ochterlony in the settlement of Rajputana from 1817–18. He was rewarded in 1822 with an unattached majority in the king's service antedated to 25 September 1803.

The name of William Linnæus Gardner first appears in the East India Company army lists in January 1819, as a local lieutenant-colonel commanding a corps of irregular cavalry, afterwards described as Gardner's Corps, as Gardner's Local Horse and as the 2nd Regiment of Local Horse. Gardner was stationed at Kasganj in 1819, at Sagar in 1821, at Bareilly from 1821–23, at Arracan in 1825 and at Kasganj again from 1826–27. In January 1828, when the 2nd Local Horse was again at Bareilly, Gardner is described as on leave and his name does not again appear in either the British or Indian army lists. No further record of him exists at the India Office.

Gardner resided at Kasganj, North West Provinces (modern day Uttar Pradesh, India), which was his private property (Hunter, Gazetteer of India, under 'Kásganj'). A skilled rider and swordsman in his prime, Gardner is described in his latter years as a "... tall, soldier-like old man, of very courteous and dignified manners and very kind to his ailing wife".

Gardner died at Kasganj on 29 July 1835, aged 65. His Begum died a month after him (Parkes, vol. i.). His tomb, and that of his Begum and his son James, still stand in Kasganj today.
