= Herbert Gardner, 1st Baron Burghclere =

British Liberal politician

The Right Honourable The Lord Burghclere PC
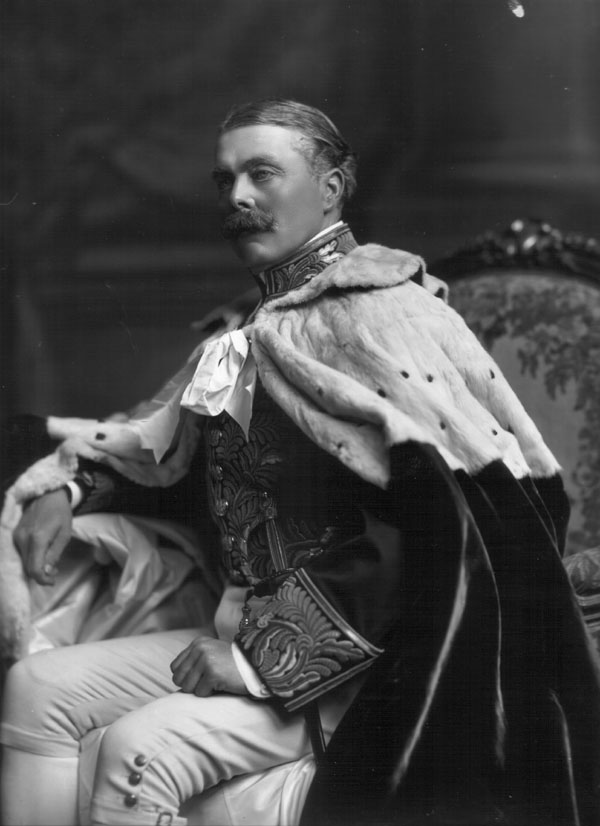
- Photographed 8 August 1902

President of the Board of Agriculture
- In office 25 August 1892 – 21 June 1895
- Monarch: Victoria
- Prime Minister: William Ewart Gladstone; The Earl of Rosebery
- Preceded by: Henry Chaplin
- Succeeded by: Walter Long

Personal details
- Born: Herbert Colstoun Gardner; 9 June 1846
- Died: 6 May 1921 (aged 74)
- Party: Liberal
- Spouse: Lady Winifred Herbert (m. 1890)
- Children: Juliet Gardner; Alethea Fry, Lady Fry; Mary Hope-Morley, Baroness Hollenden; Evelyn Gardner
- Education: Trinity Hall, Cambridge

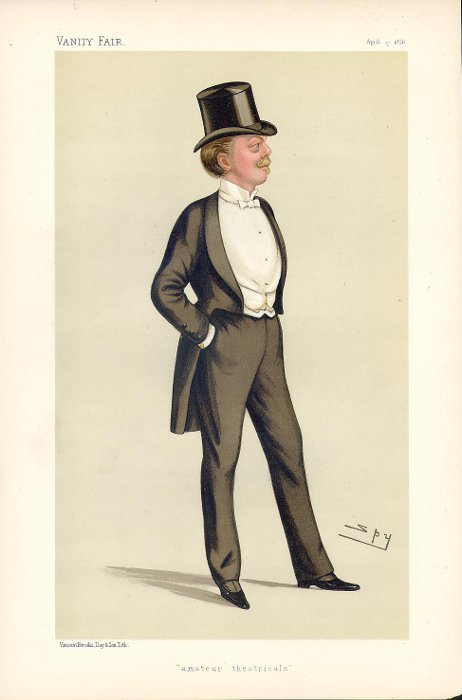
"Amateur theatricals". Caricature by Spy published in Vanity Fair in 1886

Herbert Colstoun Gardner, 1st Baron Burghclere, PC (9 June 1846 – 6 May 1921) was a British Liberal politician who sat in the House of Commons from 1885 until he was raised to the peerage in 1895. He served as President of the Board of Agriculture between 1892 and 1895.

== Early life ==
Gardner was born on 9 June 1846. He was the son of Alan Gardner, 3rd Baron Gardner, by his second wife, the professional actress Juliah Sarah (née Fortescue). However, he was born two years before his parents' marriage and was consequently not allowed to succeed in the barony of Gardner on his father's death in 1883. He had an elder brother who was not formally recognised as the baron: Alan Coulston Gardner who joined the British army and saw action in India and famously in the Anglo-Zulu War

His paternal grandparents were Alan Gardner, 2nd Baron Gardner, an admiral in the British Navy, and Charlotte (née Smith) Gardner, third daughter of Robert Smith, 1st Baron Carrington. His maternal grandfather was Edward E. T. Fortescue.

He was educated at Harrow School followed by Trinity Hall, Cambridge.

== Career ==
While at Cambridge, he was a member and eventually manager of the Amateur Dramatic Club which was 'flourishing exceedingly' under his management. He later acted with the Canterbury Old Stagers for whom he and William Yardley wrote some of the best plays and epilogues they produced.

In 1867, Gardner was admitted at Inner Temple and was a Deputy Lieutenant of Middlesex.

=== Political career ===
At the 1885 general election, Gardner was elected Member of Parliament for Saffron Walden, a seat he held until 1895. He served in the Liberal administrations of William Ewart Gladstone and later Lord Rosebery as President of the Board of Agriculture from 1892 to 1895. He was sworn of the Privy Council in 1892 and in 1895 he was raised to the peerage as Baron Burghclere, of Walden in the County of Essex.

Gardner was a director of the P and O Steamship Company. He was an Ecclesiastical Commissioner from 1903 to 1921 and chairman of Royal Commission on the Historical Monuments of England.

Gardner was also an author of several novels, and of the comedies Time will tell, Our Bitterest Foe, After Dinner and Cousin Zacchary. He published a translation of Virgil's Georgics in 1904.

== Personal life ==
On 4 March 1890, Lord Burghclere married Lady Winifred Anne Henrietta Christiana, daughter of Henry Herbert, 4th Earl of Carnarvon and Lady Evelyn Stanhope (a daughter of George Stanhope, 6th Earl of Chesterfield and Anne Stanhope, Countess of Chesterfield). Lady Winifred was the widow of Captain Alfred John George Byng (a son of George Byng, 2nd Earl of Strafford), who died in 1887. Together, they were the parents of four daughters:

- Juliet Mary Evelyn Stanhope Gardner (b. 1892), who married Alexander Duncan Cumming-Russell, son of Maj.-Gen. Francis Shirley Russell, in 1916. They divorced in 1922.
- Alethea Margaret Gwendolin Valentine Gardner (b. 1893), who married Sir Geoffrey Fry, 1st Baronet.
- Mary Sidney Katharine Almina Gardner (1896–1994), who married Geoffrey Hope-Morley, 2nd Baron Hollenden.
- Evelyn Florence Margaret Winifred Gardner (1903–1994), who was the first wife of the author Evelyn Waugh.

Lord Bughclere died in May 1921, aged 74. As he had no sons the barony became extinct on his death. Lady Burghclere died in September 1933, aged 69.

== Coat of arms ==
Coat of arms of Herbert Gardner, 1st Baron Burghclere
Crest A demi-griffin azure collared and chained and charged on the shoulder with a saltire wavy or, holding in the claws an anchor as in the arms. Escutcheon Or, on a chevron gules between three griffins’ heads erased azure, an anchor erect with a piece of cable attached between two lions counter-passant chevron wise of the field, all within a bordure wavy sable. Supporters On either side a wyvern reguardant vert, gorged with a collar flory, counter-flory or, and charged with an anchor as in the arms. Motto Valet anchora virtus (Virtue is a sheet anchor)

== Books ==
- Hesilrige, Arthur G. M. (1921). Debrett's Peerage and Titles of courtesy. London: London: Dean & son, limited. p. 153.

Parliament of the United Kingdom
New constituency	Member of Parliament for Saffron Walden; 1885–1895	Succeeded by Charles Gold
Political offices
Preceded by Henry Chaplin	President of the Board of Agriculture; 1892–1895	Succeeded by Walter Long
Peerage of the United Kingdom
New creation	Baron Burghclere; 1895–1921	Extinct
