= Alan Gardner, 1st Baron Gardner =

Royal Navy Admiral (1742–1809)

Admiral The Right Honourable The Lord Gardner
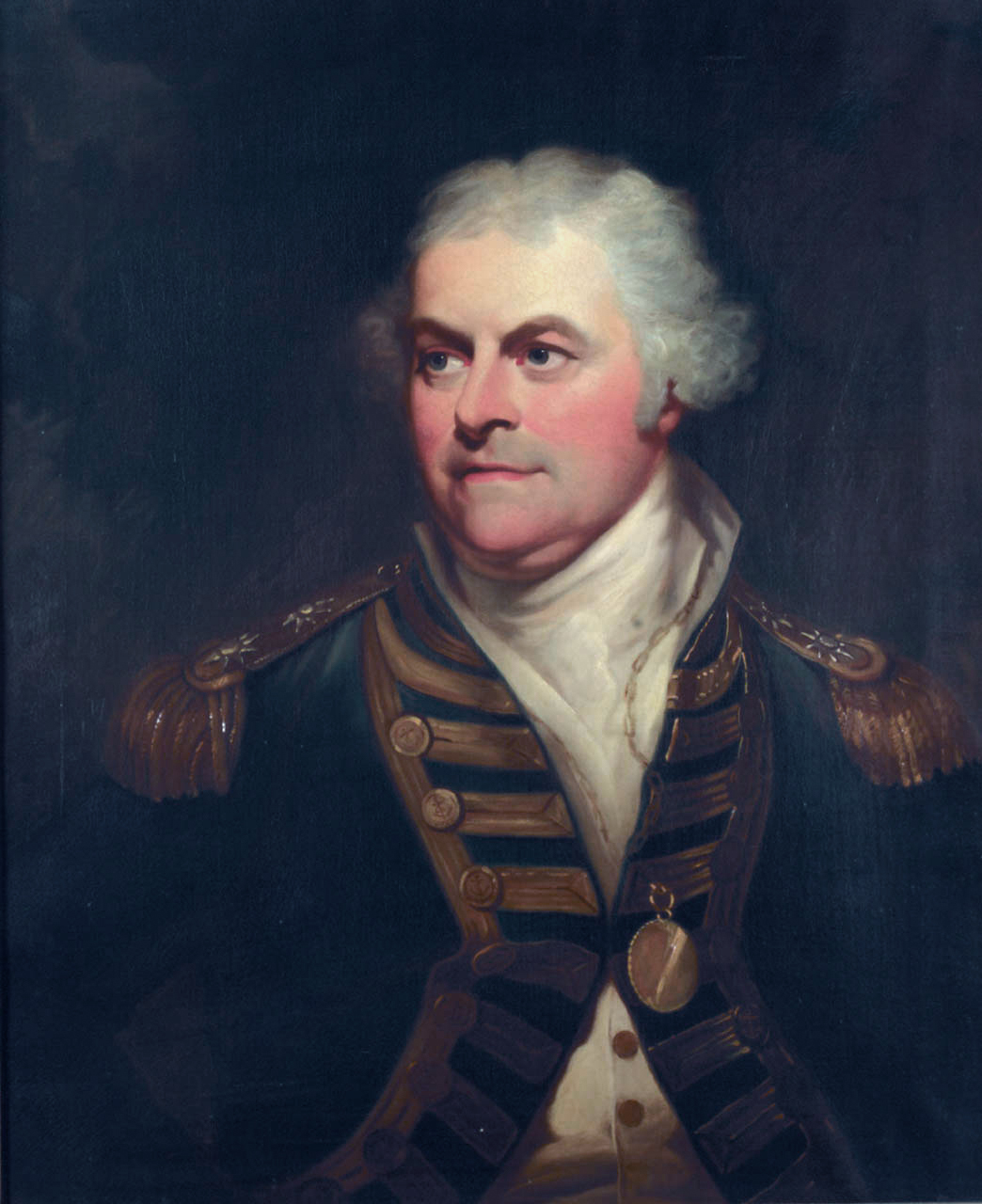
- Alan Gardner by William Beechey
- Born: 12 February 1742; Uttoxeter, England
- Died: 1 January 1809 (aged 66)
- Relatives: Alan Gardner (eldest son), Robert Barrie (nephew), William Linnæus Gardner (nephew)
- Military career
- Allegiance: Kingdom of Great Britain; Great Britain and Ireland
- Branch: Royal Navy
- Service years: 1755–1800
- Rank: Admiral
- Commands: Jamaica Station; Leeward Islands Station; Cork Station; Portsmouth Command
- Other work: MP for Plymouth and, later, Westminster.

Admiral Alan Gardner, 1st Baron Gardner (12 February 1742 – 1 January 1809), was a British Royal Navy officer and peer of the realm. He was regarded by some as one of the Georgian era's most dashing frigate captains and, ultimately, a respected senior admiral.

== Naval career ==
Gardner joined the Royal Navy in 1755. Promoted to captain in 1766, his first command was the fireship HMS Raven. He commanded a number of frigates before being promoted to a ship of the line.

In 1782, he commanded the 98-gun HMS Duke at the Battle of the Saintes, and in 1786 as commodore of the Jamaica Station (consisting of HMS Europa and HMS Experiment), he suppressed smuggling in the Gulf of Mexico and ordered detailed hydrographic surveys of Caribbean locations of interest to the Navy. During this time, he commanded and probably mentored future famous officers such as George Vancouver, Peter Puget and Joseph Whidbey.

Gardner became a Member of Parliament for Plymouth in 1790 and later for Westminster in 1796. He was appointed to the Board of Admiralty in 1790 and was appointed commander-in-chief of the Leeward Islands Station in 1793. As rear admiral in November 1793, he was among the first officers to articulate a growing conviction in the navy that lemons were the best cure for scurvy and, going against prevailing medical opinion, demanded a supply for his ships. The resulting scurvy-free voyage of HMS Suffolk to India was a crucial element in the Admiralty's decision in 1795 to issue lemon juice as a daily ration in the navy – a policy which drastically minimised outbreaks of scurvy. He left the Admiralty Board in 1795 and was promoted to full admiral. He commanded a squadron during the Mutiny at Spithead in 1797, and Gardner negotiated directly with the mutineers, until he lost his temper, seized a mutineer by the throat and threatened to hang the lot. This nearly led to his own demise at the hands of the mutineers, but cooler heads prevailed.

In 1800 he became commander-in-chief of the Cork Station. That year he was also created Baron Gardner, of Uttoxeter, in the Peerage of Ireland and in 1806 the title of Baron Gardner in the Peerage of the United Kingdom was created for him. He was briefly commander-in-chief of Portsmouth from March to June 1803, but returned to the Cork Station after that. In a letter dated 19 May 1803 to Lady Hamilton he is referred to by Lord Nelson as a drinker, saying "... I shall get from him as soon as I can for they say there is much drinking...". In 1807 he was made commander-in-chief of the Channel Fleet and he died in office on 1 January 1809.

His memorial in the south transept of Bath Abbey, where he is interred, states that "The post of Major General of the Marine Forces was purposely created and bestowed on him by His most Gracious Sovereign for the very distinguished part He took in the ever Memorable Battle of the 1st of June 1794".

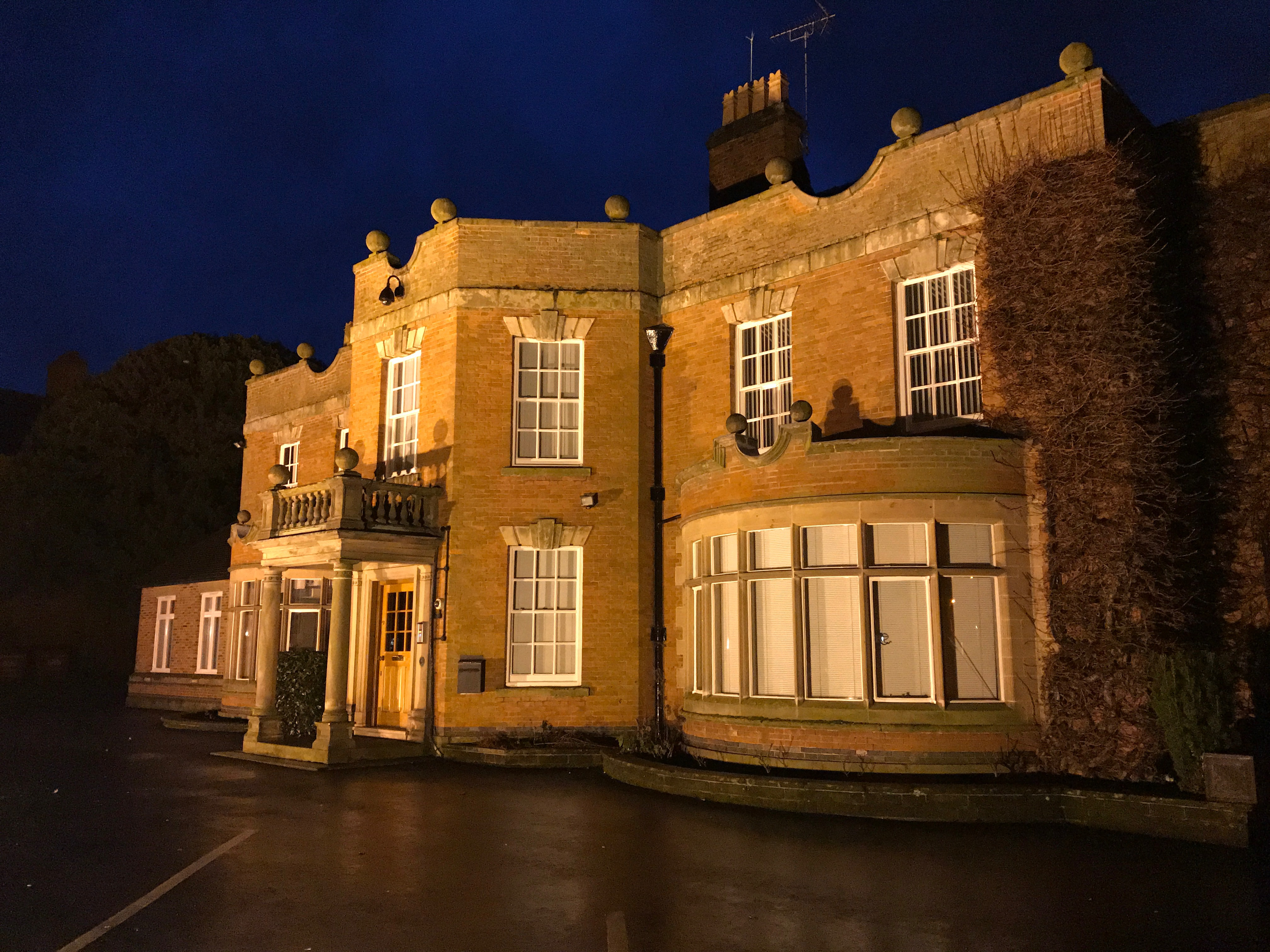
Manor House, Uttoxeter, birthplace of Admiral Alan Gardner, 1st Baron Gardner

== Family ==
Gardner was born at the Manor House, Uttoxeter, which is commemorated by a plaque. He married Susannah Hyde Gale (2 May 1749 – 20 April 1823) in Kingston, Jamaica, on 20 May 1769. She was a Jamaican heiress and the daughter of Francis Gale, a plantation owner, and Susanna Hall. They had nine sons and a daughter. His eldest son, Alan Gardner, 2nd Baron Gardner, became an admiral in the Royal Navy; the second son, Francis, also became an admiral; and the third son William, became a major general.

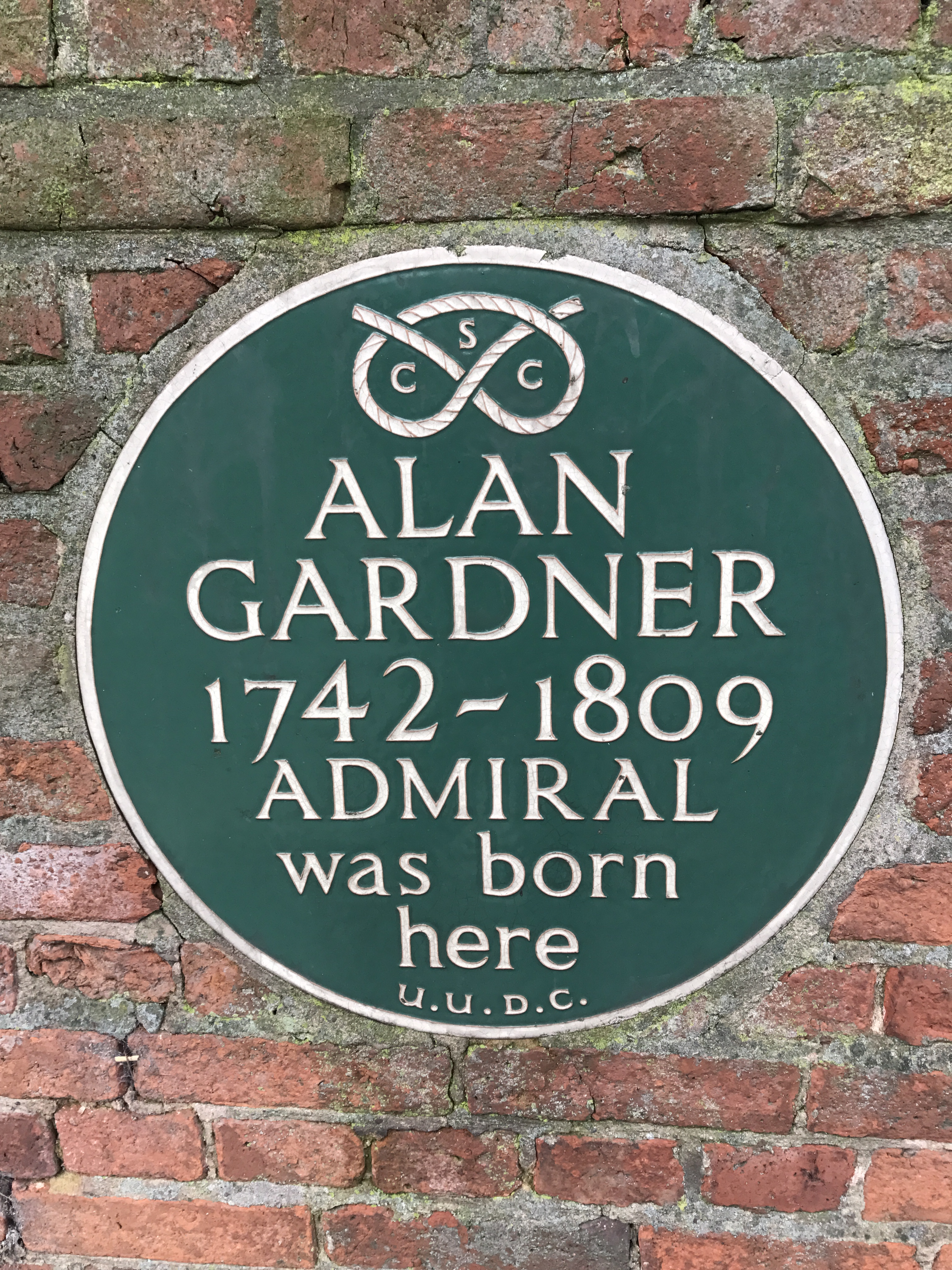
Alan Gardner Plaque

Gardner's brother, Major Valentine Gardner, served with the 16th Foot during its service in America from 1767 to 1782, and his son (Gardner's nephew) was Colonel William Linnæus Gardner, a British Indian officer, who created Gardner's Horse in 1809.

Gardner's sister, Dorothea (Dolly) Gardner Barrie, had a son Robert Barrie who by the patronage of his uncle took part in the Vancouver Expedition. Later in life, Barrie would be knighted and become a rear admiral.

== Legacy ==
An East Indiaman was named after Admiral Gardner; it was wrecked on the Goodwin Sands, 25 January 1809. It was carrying a large number of copper 10 and 20 cash coins minted by the East India Company for circulation in the Madras Presidency. The coins were preserved in tightly sealed barrels and large numbers were retrieved in 1985. They are frequently packaged and sold as inexpensive "shipwreck coins."

== Sources ==
- Cundall, Frank (1915). Historic Jamaica. West India Committee.

Parliament of Great Britain
Preceded by Captain Robert Fanshawe; Captain John MacBride	Member of Parliament for Plymouth; 1790–1796; With: Captain John MacBride (1790); Sir Frederick Leman Rogers (1790–1796)	Succeeded by Sir William Elford; Sir Frederick Leman Rogers
Preceded by Samuel Hood	Member of Parliament for Westminster; 1796–1801	Parliament of the United Kingdom
Parliament of the United Kingdom
New parliament	Member of Parliament for Westminster; 1801–1806	Succeeded by Earl Percy
Military offices
Preceded by John Pakenham	Commander-in-Chief, Jamaica Station; 1785	Succeeded by Alexander Innes
Preceded by Alexander Innes	Commander-in-Chief, Jamaica Station; 1786–1789	Succeeded by Philip Affleck
Preceded by Sir John Laforey	Commander-in-Chief, Leeward Islands Station; 1793	Succeeded by Sir John Jervis
Preceded by Robert Kingsmill	Commander-in-Chief, Cork Station; 1800–1803	Succeeded by Not filled
Preceded by Mark Milbanke	Commander-in-Chief, Portsmouth; March 1803 – June 1803	Succeeded by Sir George Montagu
Preceded by Not filled	Commander-in-Chief, Cork Station; 1803–1807	Succeeded by James Hawkins-Whitshed
Peerage of Ireland
New creation	Baron Gardner; 1800–1809	Succeeded by Alan Gardner
Peerage of the United Kingdom
New creation	Baron Gardner; 1806–1809	Succeeded by Alan Gardner
Baronetage of Great Britain
New creation	Baronet of Uttoxeter; 1794–1809	Succeeded by Alan Gardner
