= William Gairdner =

William Gairdner may refer to:

- William Gairdner (physician) (1793–1867), physician
- William Tennant Gairdner (1824–1907), physician
- William Henry Temple Gairdner (1873–1928), missionary
- Bill Gairdner (born 1940), athlete

== See also ==
- Gairdner (surname)
- William Gardiner (disambiguation)
- William Gardner (disambiguation)
