= William Gardner =

William or Bill Gardner may refer to:

== Sport ==
- Bill Gardner (baseball) (1868–1948), American baseball player
- Bill Gardner (football hooligan) (born 1954), English football supporter, former football hooligan and co-author of books on football hooliganism
- Bill Gardner (footballer) (1893–1973), English professional footballer
- Bill Gardner (ice hockey) (born 1960), retired ice hockey player
- Bill Gardner (rugby union) (1929–2012), Australian rugby union player
- Billy Gardner (born 1927), retired American baseball player
- "Wee" Willie Gardner (1933–2000), American basketball player for the Harlem Globetrotters
- William Jennings Gardner (1884–1965), American football player and member of Eliot Ness's "Untouchables"

== Military ==
- William Gardner (sailor) (1832–?), American Civil War sailor and Medal of Honor recipient
- William Gardner (VC) (1821–1897), Scottish recipient of the Victoria Cross
- William Linnæus Gardner (1771–1835), Indian officer
- William M. Gardner (1824–1901), Confederate States Army brigadier general

== Others ==
- Bill Gardner (author) ((fl. 1980s–2020s), American author
- Bill Gardner (politician) (born 1948), secretary of state for New Hampshire
- William A. Gardner (born 1942), American electrical engineer and professor
- William Biscombe Gardner (1847–1919), English painter and wood-engraver
- William E. Gardner Jr. (1939–1991), president of Savannah State College
- William Gardner (Australian settler) (1802–1860), pioneer and historian
- William Gardner (coin designer) (1914–2000), English coin designer, engraver, calligrapher and writer
- William Gardner (former slave) (1759–unknown), freedman who had been a slave of U.S. President James Madison
- William Gardner (Massachusetts judge) (1827–1888), justice of the Massachusetts Supreme Judicial Court
- William Gardner (surgeon) (1846–1897), practised in South Australia and Victoria
- William Gardner, a 17-year-old African American boy killed in August 2024 by Baltimore Police Department officers
- William Gardner, pseudonym of Peter Hope (born 1930), British composer and arranger
- William James Gardner (1825–1874), British missionary in Jamaica
- Willie Gardner (fl. 1970s–2020s), Scottish rock musician
- Will Gardner, a fictional character in the American series The Good Wife

== See also ==
- William Gardner Hale (1849–1928), American classical scholar
- William Gardner Smith (1927–1974), African-American novelist and journalist
- William Gairdner (disambiguation)
- William Gardiner (disambiguation)
