= Gairdner =

Gairdner is a surname. Notable people with the surname include:

- Alice Elizabeth Gairdner (1873–1954), British plant scientist, geneticist and cytologist
- Bill Gairdner (1940–2024), Canadian track and field athlete
- Douglas Gairdner (1910–1992), Scottish pediatrician, research scientist, academic and author
- Charles Gairdner (1898–1983), British Governor of Western Australia and Tasmania
- James Gairdner (1828–1912), British historian
- John Gairdner (1790–1876), Scottish politician
- Scott Gairdner (born 1985), American comedy writer, director and podcast
- William Gairdner (disambiguation), multiple people

== See also ==
- Gardner (disambiguation)
