= Constance E. Padwick =

English missionary

Constance Evelyn Padwick (2 July 1886 – 1968) was an English missionary. She was known as one of the leading British women missionaries and one of the first women missiologists of the twentieth century: she also worked with Church Mission Society for several years. She lived and worked in Cairo, Egypt and traveled to many different places from Fez to Lahore. In 1947 when conditions were bad because of the war she was asked to leave Jerusalem and went to Kordofan in Sudan. Padwick prepared textbooks for Christian schools for three years and then moved to Istanbul and then returned to England in 1957.

Padwick spent almost forty years in the Middle East where she learned Arabic. Her knowledge of mosques and devotees helped her write her best known work, Muslim Devotions: A Study of Prayer-Manuals in Common Use.

== Background ==
Known as Paddie to her friends, she was born at the Manor House, West Thorney, Sussex, England and grew up near Chichester, in the English countryside as well as in London. She was educated at home and then further trained as a teacher.

Padwick's father was a non-practising Barrister who farmed his own land. Her maternal Grandfather was the Reverend Thomas Pownall Boultbee who set up the London College of Divinity now St John's College, Nottingham. At the age of ten Padwick went to Finsbury Square, London where she was taught by her godmother and was also with other children through most of her teen years. This godmother was also the aunt, and governess to many other children of this household. The father of the children of this particular household was James Pratt, who was the grandson of Josiah Pratt, a founder in 1799 of C.M.S. After her teen years in this household in London she went with one of her cousins to Palestine in 1910 for a visit and fell in love with the Middle East. Near the end of her life she then lived with her sister Joy in Lower Odcombe, in Somerset, where she died.

== Education ==
Padwick was educated from home and then went out to be trained as a teacher. After her teen years she went briefly to Paris and then back with her family in Sussex where she started studying the New Testament Greek and became active in the Student Christian Movement. She went to the University of London and studied Arabic, Arab folklore and the understanding of Islam, she also took her teachers training Certificate with distinction and was rewarded by a scholarship to the School of Oriental and African Studies within the University of London. Padwick also studied Greek and pedagogy and was a student of Oriental studies of the American University in Cairo. She worked from 1909 to 1916 on the home staff of the Church Mission Society as the editor of children's magazines.

== Educational work ==
In 1912 Padwick joined C.M.S and was the editor of children's magazines. Padwick was drawn to the Middle East through the reading of the biography of Douglas M. Thornton written by Temple Gairdner. She believed literature was a great evangelistic tool. "After looking very carefully at the different positions from which it would now be possible to serve the Moslem world by means of Christian literature, and after much prayer, I have come to the deliberate conclusion that it is as a C.M.S literature missionary, if C.M.S. will have me, that I want the privilege of serving. For both on a general view and on a detailed examination, it seems to me that God calls us now to strengthen the Cairo literature department of C.M.S (CMS 3)" But when she offered to work overseas with C.M.S., she was rejected because of ill health.

Padwick nevertheless worked in Cairo, Egypt with the Nile Mission Press, where she met Paul and Bettina Kraus until 1921 and then went back to the University of London where she wrote a thesis on Arab Folklore. In 1923 she went back to Cairo, under C.M.S. and became the editorial secretary for the Central Committee for Christian Literature for Muslims. She also served in Cairo under C.M.S. for over three decades till the end of her career, which included her time in Palestine in 1937. After the war in 1947 she was asked to leave Palestine and go to the Nuba Mountains in Sudan where she wrote Arab text books for schools. She then spent three years at Katcha Kordofan which ended in November 1951 with serious illness at the age of sixty-five. Padwick wrote many different Arabic materials for those people and she ended her time in Sudan in 1951 when she became ill and retired in 1952 from C.M.S. but never really truly retired till 1957 in Dorset, Village Maiden Newton close to the heart of the Hardy country of Wessex. Somewhere in between this time she was first nursed at Omduran hospital and then by friends in Kenya until she was ready to travel to Istanbul where she spent four quiet years.

== Writings ==
Constance E. Padwick is most well known for her writing. While working for Church Mission Society she was an editor of children’s magazines, she was also one the editors of the Orient and Occident which is a Christian monthly published in Cairo. She is also known for writing biographies of Henry Martyn, Lilias Trotter and her colleague William Henry Temple Gairdner. She also wrote Muslim Devotions: A Study of Prayer-Manuals in common use, as well as Mackay of the great lake, The Master of the Impossible: Sayings for the Most part in Parable from the Letters and Journals of Lilias Trotter of Algiers (1938), and many more. She loved Muslims and writing about them, she developed specific materials for Muslim readers which included biographies about different missionaries who worked among Muslims. Many of her writings have helped youth deal with the stress of modern living and she saw her writings as a form of service in which she conducted with high standards, dedicated research and true objectivity. "Padwick's long career as missionary and missiologist bridges the gap between the female writers and strategists of the women's missionary movement and the contemporary female missiologists and mission strategists." "All that she wrote, she wrote out of a profound and missionary commitment to Christ as Christianity receives Him."

It was hard for women during Padwick’s time to be missionaries or to receive the respect that women deserved. Padwick wrote in and during a male-missionary-dominated era but she managed to make the transition, and was one of the first women to accomplish this. Her writings were published over a fifty-year period from 1918 to 1967 and her last one was published when she was 81. Her most well known book “Muslim Devotions: A Study of Prayer-Manuals in common use” analyzes the religious thought of Islam. According to Kenneth Cragg, her biography of Temple Gairdner was "one of the classics of missionary biography of this century."

== Hobbies ==
Padwick had a lifelong joy of external nature and loved flowers. She was accepted as a member by the Royal Horticultural Society of Great Britain. She loved going to different little bookstores and searching for little hand held prayer books and pocket manuals to include in her work on Muslim Devotions. She desired to know Islam's inward spirituality and wanted this devotional book to speak to the heart of Muslims. This consumed her for more than twenty years. She gained respect through friends and learned from everyone and this book is now a valuable compendium of Muslim spirituality. "Muslim Devotions, it may be truly said, is a worthy expression of Christian initiative and at the same time a comprehensive index to Muslim liturgy: It is a gesture of imagination inspired by one faith towards the inner genius of another." "She attained a patient kinship with Muslim norms and themes and made their world her own." She also stated, "for it is in knowing that we are known."

== Publications ==
Padwick published several books, including;

- White Heroines of Africa: A Book for Leaders Amongst Working Girls, 1914
- Heroines of Healing: A Book for Leaders Amongst Working Girls, 1915
- Mackey of the Great Lake, 1920
- Temple Gairdner of Cairo, 1930
- Henry Martyn: Confessor of the Faith, 1950
- Call to Instanbul, 1958
- Muslim devotions: a study of prayer-manuals in common use, 1968

== Archives ==
A collection of archival material related to Constance E. Padwick can be found at the Cadbury Research Library, University of Birmingham.
