= William Gardiner =

William Gardiner may refer to:

== Politicians ==
- William Gardiner (MP died 1558) (1522–1558), English MP for Barnstaple
- William Gardiner (MP for Helston) (1531–1597), English MP for Helston and Lostwithiel
- William Gardiner (British Army officer) (1748–1806), last British minister in Poland before its Third (and final) Partition
- William Gardiner (Wisconsin politician) (1826–?), farmer and member of the Wisconsin State Assembly in 1879
- William Tudor Gardiner (1892–1953), American politician and Governor of Maine
- Sir William Gardiner, 1st Baronet (1628–1691), English politician

== Others ==
- William Gardiner (mathematician) (died 1752), English mathematician
- William Gardiner (English composer) (1770–1853), English composer
- William Gardiner (botanist) (1808-1852), Scottish poet-botanist and umbrella maker
- William H. Gardiner (1861–1935), photographer
- William Gardiner (clergyman) (1867–1941), twice tried for the Peasenhall Murder
- William Guthrie Gardiner (died 1935), businessman and philanthropist
- William Gardiner (Australian composer) (born 1986), Australian composer
- William Gardiner (cricketer) (1864–1924), New Zealand cricketer
- William Nelson Gardiner (1766–1814), Irish engraver and bookseller
- William Gardiner (rugby union), Irish international rugby union player

== See also ==
- William Gairdner (disambiguation)
- William Gardner (disambiguation)
