= William Henry Temple Gairdner =

British Christian missionary

William Henry Temple Gairdner

William Henry Temple Gairdner (31 July 1873 – 22 May 1928) was a British Christian missionary with the Church Missionary Society in Cairo, Egypt. His entire life was dedicated to service in Egypt as he himself commented when he was first preparing to leave. While in Cairo he partnered with his friend Douglas M. Thornton to reach educated Muslims with the gospel of Jesus Christ. This dynamic duo held many lectures in their home, Beit Arabi Pasha, and wrote a weekly magazine, Orient and Occident.

After Thornton's death in 1907 Gairdner continued his work in Cairo but was never able to recapture the amount of work that was accomplished when Thornton was at his side. It was this lack of help that would plague his ministry until the day of his death in 1928. Gairdner was a prolific writer and scholar of Arabic. He showed much promise to contribute greatly in theological and scholarly circles of Islam but instead chose to serve the local church in Cairo.

== Family and early life ==
Gairdner was born in Ardrossan, Ayrshire, Scotland on 31 July 1873. He was the son of Sir William Tennant Gairdner, a Scotsman, and Helen Bridget Wright, an English-woman. Gairdner was educated at St Ninian's Prep School, Moffat and Rossall School. His father served as a professor of medicine at Glasgow University and bestowed upon young Gairdner his passions for music, science, and philosophy. His mother contributed to Gairdner's experiences in school life and church life as she often conveyed her love for the Anglican Church to him as well as arranged for his traditional English education. Gairdner's personality drew greatly from his mother. From her he drew his sense of humor and emotional nature.

Gairdner married Margaret Mitchell on 16 October 1902 at Christ Church, Nazareth. Margaret was one of Gairdner's childhood friends and was the daughter of Dr. John Oswald Mitchell, and granddaughter of Rev. W. Ackworth.

Gairdner and Margaret celebrated twenty-five years of marriage and raised five children together before Gairdner's death in 1928.

== Oxford University ==
Gairdner entered Trinity College, Oxford in October 1892. Gairdner's educational career at Oxford is marked by his involvement in the Oxford Inter-Collegiate Christian Union (OICCU). Gairdner remained on the fringe of this group until March 1893 "Where he experienced the overwhelming ‘embrace of Christ’, and responded in faith." It was at the Congress of Unions at Oxford that brought Gairdner to this point and pushed him into a new passion for service and witness. Gairdner finished his time at Oxford in 1897 but that would not be the last time he would spend in diligent study. In 1910 after serving eleven years with the Church Missionary Society in Cairo, Egypt, Gairdner was granted a one-year leave of absence to study Arabic and Islam. Gairdner was gone for a total of eighteen months leaving at the end of May 1910 and returning to Cairo in November 1911. Gairdner made three major stops on this educational leave, the first being in Potsdam, Germany to study the German language and be able to read German literature of which there were many writings on Islamic topics. The next five months were spent at Hartford Theological Seminary in Hartford, Connecticut where he was able to study with Duncan Black MacDonald who was one of the foremost Western scholars of Islam. The last portion of his study year was used to return to Europe where he studied with the Hungarian scholar of Islam, Ignaz Goldziher, and toured different institutions to study methods of missionary training.

== Career ==
After finishing his schooling at Oxford, Gairdner became a travelling secretary for the Student Christian Movement until 1899. At this point Gairdner was ordained and the Church Missionary Society (CMS) sent him to Cairo with his beloved friend, Douglas Thornton. Gairdner's role in Cairo was to work with educated Muslims and so Gairdner and Thornton opened their home, called Beit Arabi Pasha, to conduct meetings and lead study groups with Muslims of higher education. In January 1905, Thornton and Gairdner were able to release the first issue of their Anglo-Arabic magazine, Orient and Occident. This magazine was created to present articles of general interest and to reach a wider audience than Thornton and Gairdner were already reaching. Many of the articles dealt with questions and objections that Muslims would raise about Christianity such as the authenticity of the Bible.

Thornton's death in 1907 was a large blow to Gairdner and tested him severely. However the loss of his dear friend did not hinder him in his ministry. He continued with his work, especially that of the Orient and Occident and even undertook several other writing jobs. This workload put a halt to the meetings at Beit Arabi Pasha a year after Thornton's death but Gairdner was able to finish two books by 1909, D. M. Thornton: A Study of Missionary Ideals and Methods and The Reproach of Islam.

Upon his return to Cairo after his year of absence to study Arabic and Islam during 1910-11, Gairdner found himself in a much different role than he had before. Gairdner was put to a much more technical aspect of the mission. His role now included much more grammatical work in Arabic as well as being the Mission secretary. This role was not his forte and he found great difficulty in dealing with the administrative tasks and transactions of an organisation.

After Gairdner’s time as Mission secretary he began experimenting in the medium in which the gospel could be shared. Between 1921 and 1925 Gairdner began to take biblical narratives and presenting them in dramas. This was eventually shut down by the CMS who instead advocated for the establishment of an Arabic Anglican Church. Gairdner took great delight in this church and saw that its growth was much more important than his own production of literature. Some of his last endeavours before his death in 1928 include his speaking on "Brotherhood, Islam’s or Christ’s" at a Scottish Missionary Conference in 1922 as well as the composition of several literary works. These works include Arabic-language commentaries on Galatians, Hebrews, and Philippians and The Values of Christianity and Islam.

== Selected works ==
- D.M. Thornton: A Study in Missionary Ideals and Methods (1908)
- The Reproach of Islam (1909)
- Echoes From Edinburgh 1910: An Account and Interpretation of the World Missionary Conference (1910)
- The Verse of Stoning in the Bible and the Qur'an (1910)
- The Eucharist as Historical Evidence (1910)
- God as Triune, Creator Incarnate, Atoner: A Reply to Muhammadan Objections and an Essay in Philosophic Apology (1916)
- "Mohammed without Camouflage: Ecce Homo Arabicus," Moslem World 9, (1917): 25–57.
- "The Christian Church as a Home for Christ's Converts from Islam," Moslem World 14, (1924): 235–246.
- Al-Ghazzali's mishkat Al-Anwar : or, The Niche for Lights (London: Royal Asiatic Society, 1924; Asiatic Society Monographs, vol. 19)
- The Muslim Idea of God (1925)
- The Phonetics of Arabic: A Phonetic Inquiry and Practical Manual for the Pronunciation of Classical Arabic and of One Colloquial (the Egyptian) (London: H. Milford, Oxford University Press, 1925)
- Egyptian Colloquial Arabic: A Conversation Grammar (London: H. Milford, Oxford University Press, 1926)
- Commentary on Galatians (in Arabic)
- Commentary on Hebrews (in Arabic)
- Commentary on Philippians (in Arabic)

=== Translations ===
- The Niche for Lights (Mishkât Al-Anwar, 1924)

For a more complete bibliography, see Lyle L. Vander Werff, Christian Mission to Muslims, the Record: Anglican and Reformed Approaches in India and the Near East, 1800–1938 (South Pasadena, CA: William Carey Library, 1977), 279–282; and Constance E. Padwick, Temple Gairdner of Cairo (London: Society for Promoting Christian Knowledge, 1929), 327–330.

=== See also ===
- Douglas Gairdner
- Constance E. Padwick

== Source material ==
- Tucker, Ruth A. From Jerusalem to Irian Jaya: A Biographical History of Christian Missions. Grand Rapids, MI: Zondervan, 1983, 2004.
- Cragg, Kenneth. "Temple Gairdner's Legacy". International Bulletin of Missionary Research, 5, no. 4 (October 1981): 164–167.
