= Douglas Gairdner =

Scottish paediatrician, research scientist, academic and author

Douglas Montagu Temple Gairdner
- Born: 19 November 1910
- Died: 10 May 1992 (aged 81)
- Education: Trinity College, Oxford, Middlesex Hospital
- Scientific career
- Fields: Neonatologist, Pediatrician, author, writer
- Workplaces: Great Ormond Street Hospital, Bellevue Hospital, University of Cambridge

Douglas Montagu Temple Gairdner FRCP (19 November 1910 – 10 May 1992) was a Scottish paediatrician, research scientist, academic and author. Gairdner was principally known for a number of research studies in neonatology at a time when that subject was being developed as perhaps the most rewarding application of basic physiology to patient care, and later his most important contributions as editor, firstly editing Recent Advances in Paediatrics, and then of Archives of Disease in Childhood for 15 years, turning the latter into an international journal of repute with its exemplary standards of content and presentation.

== Early life ==
Gairdner, the son of William Henry Temple Gairdner, an Anglican missionary, and grandson of Sir William Tennant Gairdner, KCB, a medical doctor and professor, was born in Scotland on 19 November 1910. His mother was Mary Mitchell. He was the great-nephew of historian James Gairdner. Gairdner was named for his father's late friend, Douglas M. Thornton who had died three years before Gairdner's birth. Gairdner had four siblings. His very early life was spent in Egypt where his father was a missionary. Gairdner's father died in 1928, when Gairdner was 17 years of age.

Gairdner attended Kelvinside Academy, Glasgow Dragon School, Oxford; and Gresham's School, Holt. He went to school with W. H. Auden and Benjamin Britten and sang madrigals with classmate Peter Pears.

He read chemistry at the University of Oxford but switched to medicine, did clinical training at Middlesex Hospital and was awarded his Bachelor of Medicine, Bachelor of Surgery Degree in 1936. He did his residency (house physician) in paediatrics at The Hospital for Sick Children, Great Ormond Street in Bloomsbury, London in 1937-8. Gairdner described his experience there in a memoir written a half-century later. He wrote, "I recall the sheer enjoyment of working there, but also the periods of overwhelming exhaustion."

== Professional career ==
Gairdner worked as a fellow in paediatrics at Bellevue Hospital in 1939. During the Second World War, served in the Royal Army Medical Corps for five years, retiring with the rank of Major.

He became first assistant in the paediatric department at Newcastle where he began to work under Professor Sir James Calvert Spence in 1945. In 1948, he became a consultant paediatrician at Addenbrooke's Hospital, Cambridge, and associate lecturer in paediatrics at the University of Cambridge, where he remained until his retirement in 1975.

His obituary in the British Medical Journal described Gairdner as "an outstanding figure in the development of British Paediatrics after the second world war". His statistics from the special care baby unit were "invaluable in monitoring trends in perinatal mortality and morbidity since 1950." He constantly produced important research over a range of topics and he improved the management of respiratory problems in the newborn. He was appointed editor of the Archives of Disease in Childhood in 1964, a position he held for 15 years, until his retirement in 1979. During that time the journal "steadlily increased in size, scientific content, and international reputation."

Gairdner's 1949 article, The Fate of the Foreskin: A Study of Circumcision, was described as "a model of perceptive and pungent writing." It concluded that if circumcision became uncommon it would result in "the saving of about 16 children's lives lost from circumcision each year in this country..." According to Wallerstein, the article "began to affect the practice of circumcision by the British". Gairdner was pleased with the success of the article. Gairdner also opposed unnecessary tonsillectomy, drawing attention to the risks of the operation at the time (1951) and suggested more conservative ways of treating repeated respiratory infections.

Gairdner served as editor of Recent Advances in Paediatrics, an annual book publication, for several years from 1954.

Gairdner's research interests included Schōnlein-Henoch purpura, nephrotic syndrome, circumcision, and the formation of red blood cells in infancy. He made contributions to the field of neonatology with studies on improving the management of respiratory problems of the newborn. PubMed lists sixty-one published papers by Dr Gairdner.

== Honours ==
The James Spence Medal of the British Paediatric Association was awarded to Gairdner in 1976. He received the Dawson Williams Prize of the British Medical Association in 1978 for his creative editing of the Archives of Disease in Childhood. Gairdner vacationed several times in Portugal as guest of the Portuguese Academy of Paediatrics where he won the respect of the local paediatricians who called him "the best paediatric ambassador who ever came to Portugal."

== Personal life ==
Gairdner lived in a detached house on Rutherford Road in Cambridge. Gairdner and his wife, Nancy, had four girls. The youngest was killed in a road accident.

Gairdner was a talented musician who played the ukulele, the flute, and the tuba. He was a member of the Royston Town Band, a brass band that plays in and around the city of Royston, Hertfordshire (about 13 miles south-west of Cambridge). He also was a sailor and kept a boat named the "Merry Thought".

Gairdner loved to read and told of his wide-ranging interests in an article published by the British Medical Journal.

He was described as a man with a strong sense of social responsibility who took politics seriously and a radical by temperament who "found it difficult to combine his feel for tradition with the need for change."

== Death ==
Gairdner died on 10 May 1992 at the age of 81. He was survived by his wife, Nancy, three daughters, and five grandchildren.

== See also ==
- History of male circumcision
- Circumcision controversies
