= Archives of Disease in Childhood =

- Discipline: Paediatrics
- Language: English
- Edited by: Nick Brown

Publication details
- History: 1926–present
- Publisher: BMJ Group (United Kingdom)
- Frequency: Monthly
- Impact factor: 3.4 (2025)

Standard abbreviations
- ISO 4: Arch. Dis. Child.

Indexing
- CODEN: ADCHAK
- ISSN: 0003-9888 (print); 1468-2044 (web)
- OCLC no.: 01513868

Links
- Journal homepage; Online access; Online archive

Archives of Disease in Childhood is a peer-reviewed medical journal published by the BMJ Group and covering the field of paediatrics. It is the official journal of the Royal College of Paediatrics and Child Health.

== Scope ==
Archives of Disease in Childhood focuses on all aspects of child health and disease from the perinatal period through to adolescence. It includes original research reports, commentaries, reviews of clinical and policy issues, and evidence reports. Other sections include: guidelines updates, international health, and a column written by patients about their experience with the health care system.

Douglas Gairdner served as editor from 1964 to 1979 and because of his creative editing, he was awarded the Dawson-Williams prize of the British Medical Association.

== Abstracting and indexing ==
The journal is indexed on MEDLINE/Index Medicus, Web of Science, and Excerpta Medica.

According to the Journal Citation Reports, the journal has a 2024 impact factor of 3.2.

== Special editions ==
=== Education and Practice ===
Education & Practice Cover

This edition is published bimonthly and was established in 2004. It aims to assist paediatricians, at all levels in their training, in their ongoing professional development. The edition is supported by the Royal College of Paediatrics and Child Health.

=== Fetal and Neonatal ===
Fetal and Neonatal Cover

This bimonthly edition brings together research and reviews in the field of perinatal and neonatal medicine. Original research papers cover foetal and neonatal physiology and clinical practice, genetics, perinatal epidemiology, and neurodevelopmental outcomes.

=== Paediatric and Perinatal Drug Therapy ===
This quarterly section publishing original research, reviews, comment and analysis in all areas of paediatric drug therapy.
