= John Gairdner =

Scottish physician

Dr John Gairdner FRCS (18 September 1790 – 12 December 1876) was a Scottish physician.

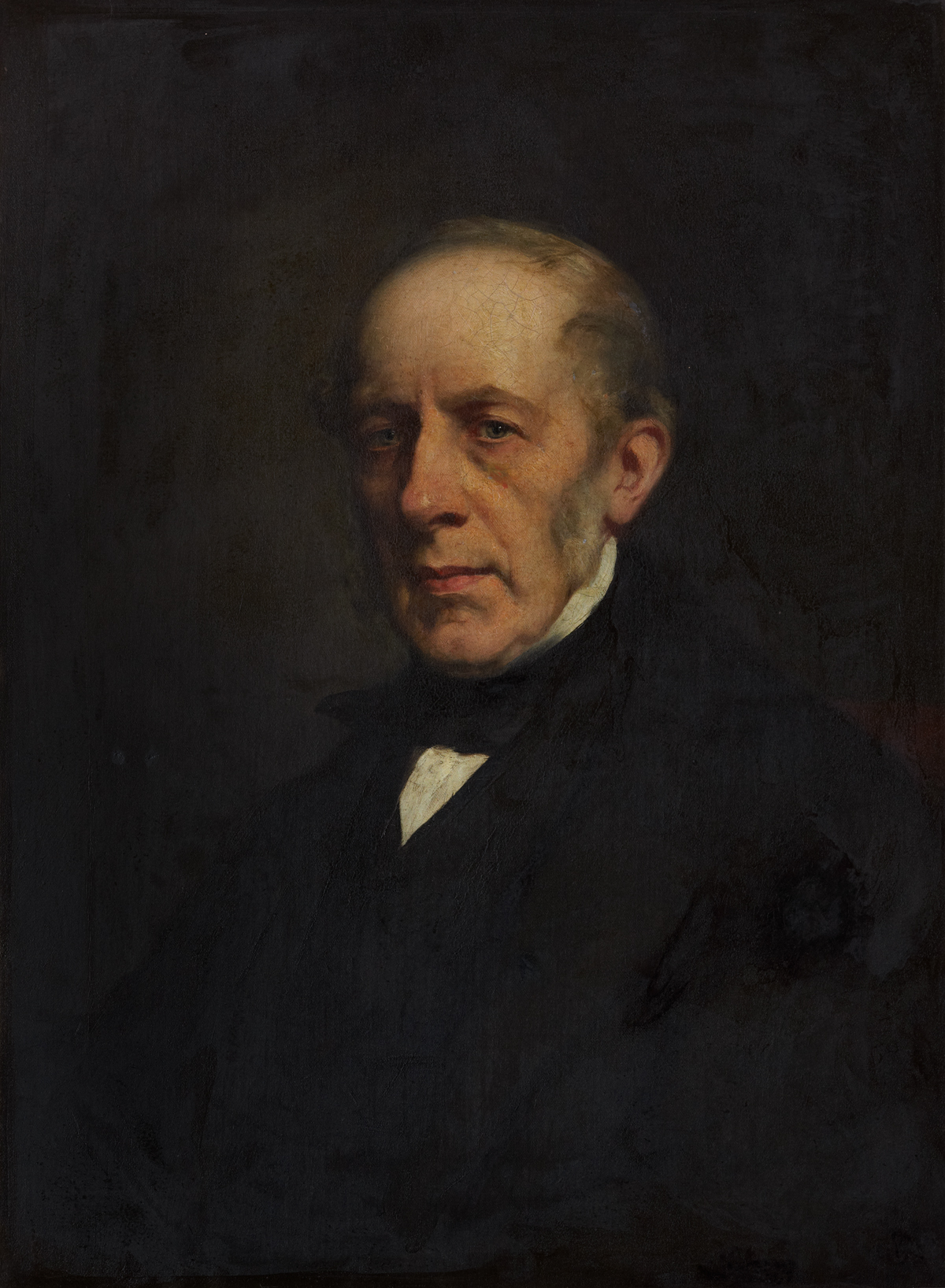
John Gairdner

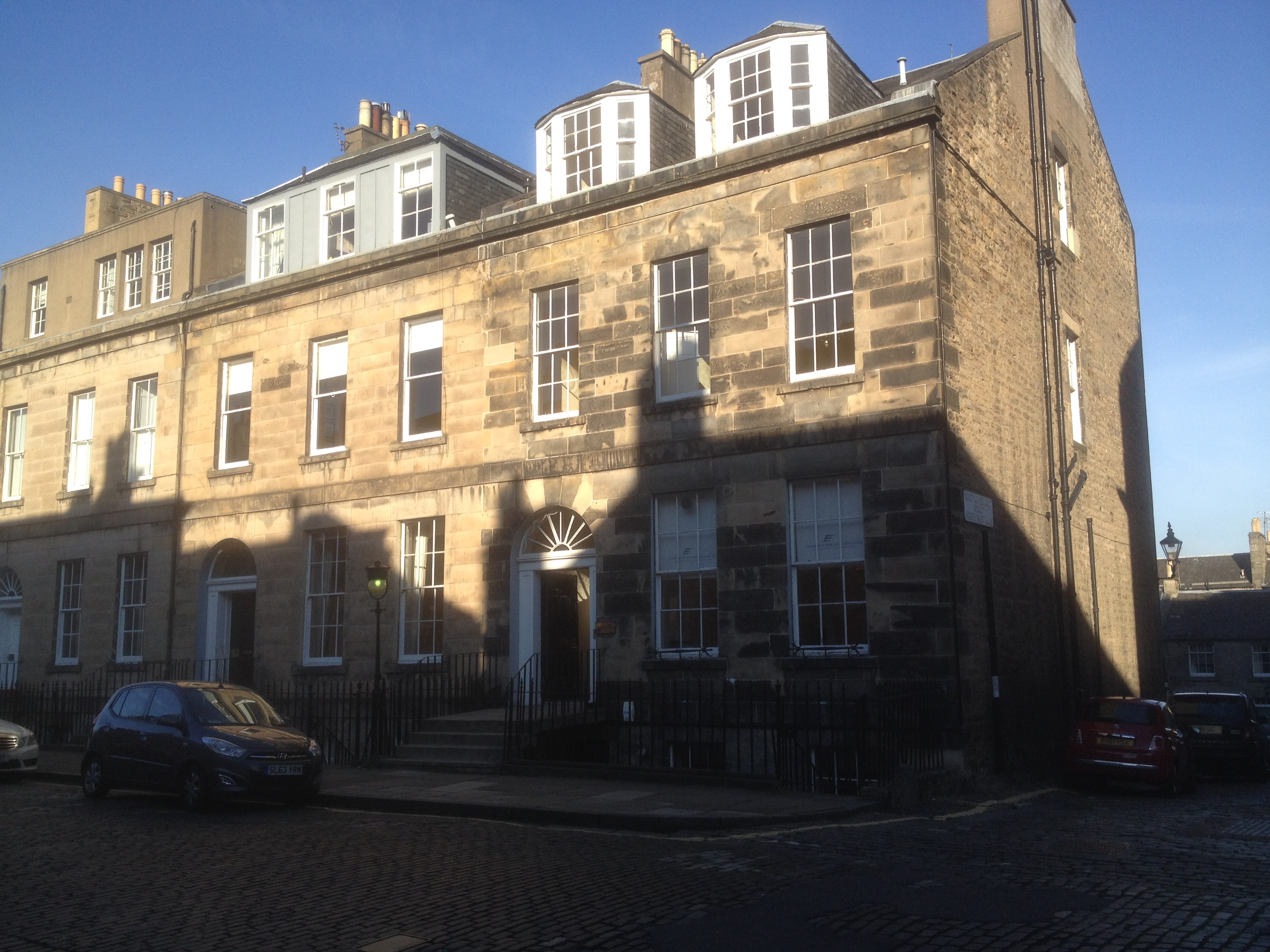
45 Northumberland Street (centre)

== Life ==
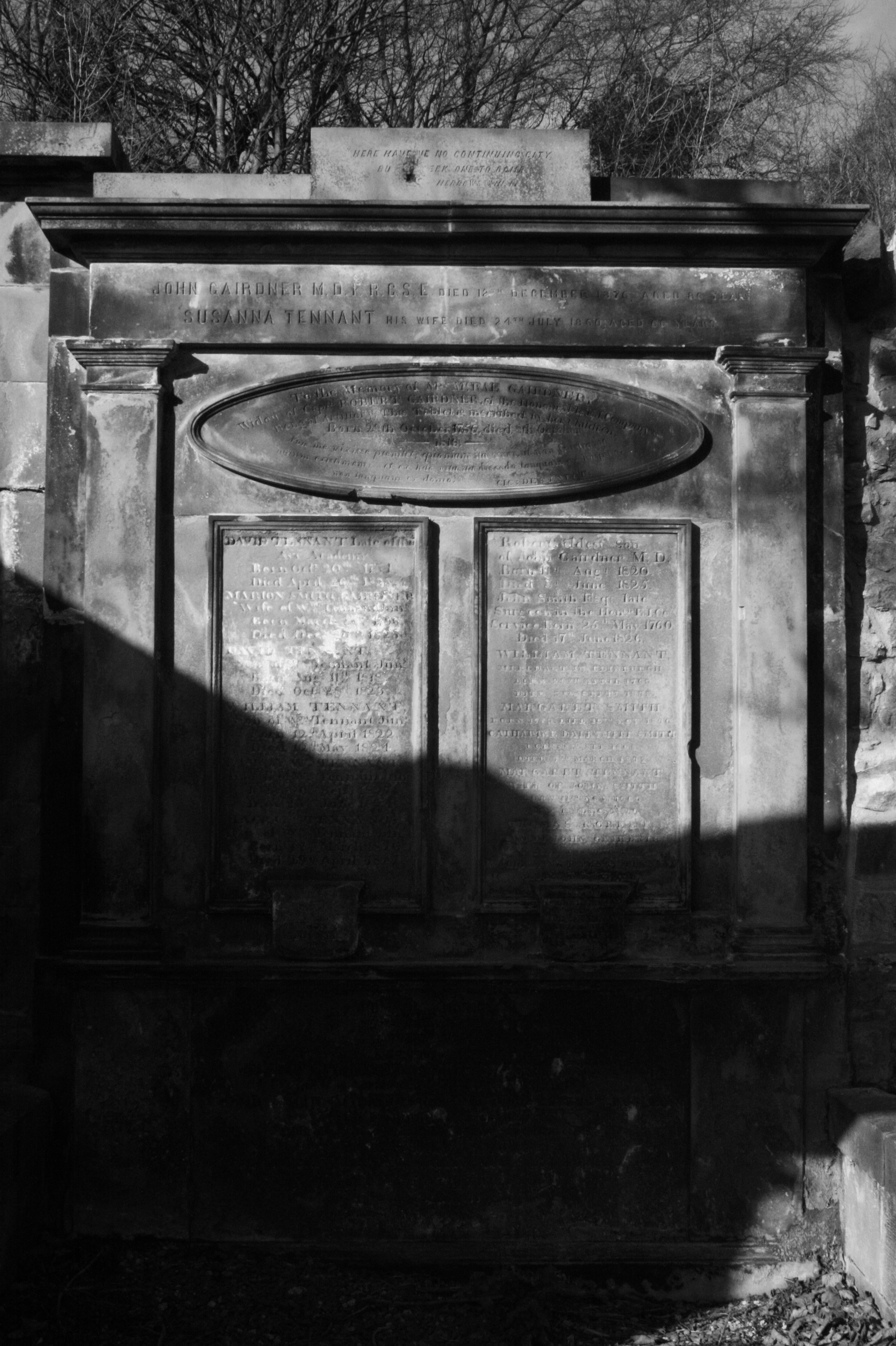
The grave of Dr John Gairdner, New Calton Burial Ground, Edinburgh

He was the eldest son of Captain Robert Gairdner of the Bengal artillery, and brother of William Gairdner, born at Mount Charles, near Ayr, on 18 September 1790. When he was five years old his father was killed by the kick of a horse. He received his school education at Ayr Academy, and after he moved with his family to Edinburgh in 1808, studied medicine at the University of Edinburgh, receiving his MD in 1811. He spent the winter of 1812 in London, studying anatomy under Charles Bell.

In 1813 Gairdner went into practice in Edinburgh in partnership with Dr Farquharson. In the same year he became a fellow of the College of Surgeons of Edinburgh, and four years later began to act as examiner for the College. For many years he was the College's treasurer, and later he was president from 1830 to 1832. This appointment gave him a seat in the unreformed town council of Edinburgh. The election for the parliament of 1831 was entirely in the hands of the town council, and Gairdner, a reformer, seconded the nomination of Francis Jeffrey, Lord Advocate. The majority of the council, however, disregarded a petition presented to them and elected Robert Adam Dundas. They departed through back streets, while a mob attacked the Lord Provost and threatened to throw him over the North Bridge.

In the 1830s he was living in the centre of the Edinburgh's New Town at 18 Hill Street.

With his friend William Wood, Gairdner supported a move allowing medical students at the University of Edinburgh the right to receive professional training from extra-academical lectures. He also gave evidence before parliamentary committees in London, on behalf of the Royal College of Surgeons of Edinburgh, in the efforts made to secure a legal status for licensed practitioners of medicine and surgery extending throughout the UK, ahead of the Medical Act 1859.

Gairdner joined a small group of Unitarians, and this was thought to have hampered his career. He was involved in setting up of a new Unitarian chapel in Edinburgh. He later returned to the Church of Scotland.

Gairnder died at home, 45 Northumberland Street in Edinburgh on 12 December 1876, at the age of 86. He is buried in New Calton Burial Ground in east Edinburgh. The grave lies against the north wall. His father-in-law David Tennant of Ayr Academy (1751-1835) is also buried there.

== Works ==
Gairdner wrote in Transactions of the Medico-Chirurgical Society of Edinburgh, and in the medical journals, almost to the end of his life. He also published two lectures, one on the history of the Edinburgh College of Surgeons, the other on the early history of the medical profession in Edinburgh. He published in his later years a Calendar printed on cardboard, with a cardboard slide, for the verification of dates.

Robert Burns and the Ayrshire Moderates (1883) was published after Gairdner's death. It reprinted anonymous letters in The Scotsman on Robert Burns.

== Family ==
In 1817 Gairdner married his cousin Susanna Tennant (d.1860), a granddaughter of Dr William Dalrymple of Ayr. Together they had two daughters and three sons. He survived his wife by 16 years, and he was survived by his children. His sons were William Tennant Gairdner, Professor of Medicine at the University of Glasgow and archivist and historian James Gairdner.

== Notes ==
Attribution

This article incorporates text from a publication now in the public domain: Stephen, Leslie, ed. (1889). "Gairdner, John". Dictionary of National Biography. Vol. 20. London: Smith, Elder & Co.
