= Bill Gardner (author) =

American business owner, graphic designer, speaker and author

Bill Gardner is an American businessman, graphic designer, speaker and author who founded Gardner Design and LogoLounge.

== Career ==
Gardner started Gardner's Graphic Hands, a graphic design firm in 1983. In 1987, Gardner joined forces with Sonia Greteman and Susan Mikulecky to found American Institute of Graphic Arts Wichita. Gardner served as the chapter's founding president.

Gardner, Greteman and Mikulecky started a graphic design firm – Gardner, Greteman + Mikulecky – in 1989, which became Gardner + Greteman after Mikulecky left in 1992.

In 1994, Gardner founded Gardner Design as the sole owner and president.

=== LogoLounge ===
LogoLounge is a research and networking tool for graphic designers who create corporate identities, or logos. Members can search the database by keywords provided by the originator, or according to such criteria as designer, color, shape, symbol, client, etc. Members also bookmark and organize favorite designs in “Collections,” read articles pertaining to the graphic design industry, and connect with other members.

LogoLounge launched in 2002 and was created from a need for an efficient way to find reference material for logos. Gardner is the founder.

Logos submitted to LogoLounge are considered for publication in the affiliated book series Each book features the most recent top 2,000 logos selected by industry judges and organized according to trends and keywords. As of 2018, LogoLounge Volumes 1, 2, 3, 4, 5, 6, 7 and 8, and Master Library Volumes 1, 2, 3 and 4 have been published by Rockport Publishers. Book 9 was published by HOW Publishing, and Book 10 and all future books will be published by Indicia Press

== Awards and honors ==
In September 2014, Gardner received the first-ever AIGA Wichita Fellow Award for his contributions to the local, national and international creative community.
