= William Tennant Gairdner =

Scottish Professor of Medicine

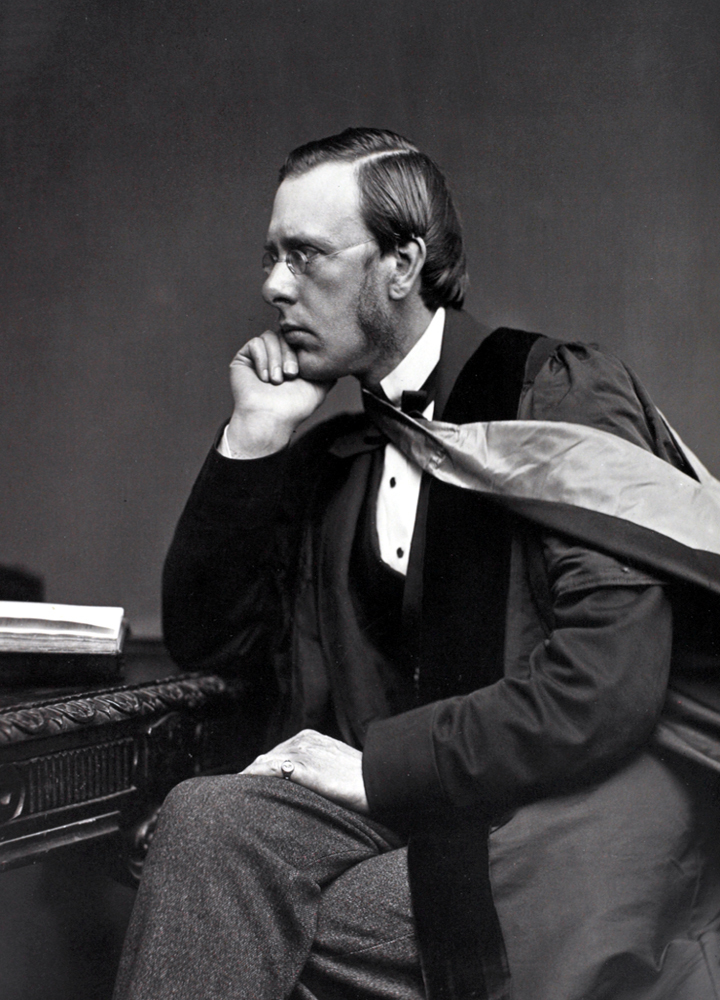
William Tennant Gairdner in 1871

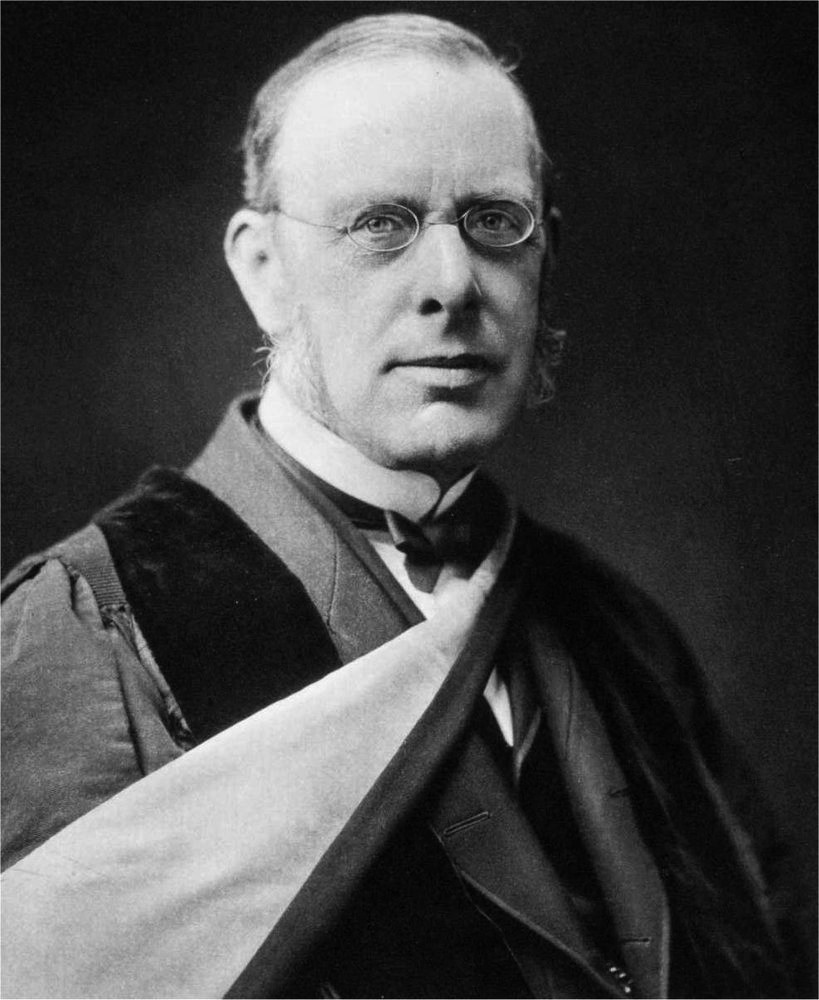
William Tennant Gairdner in 1891

Sir William Tennant Gairdner KCB FRCPE FRS (8 November 1824 – 28 June 1907) was a Scottish Professor of Medicine in the University of Glasgow.

== Early life ==
William Tennant Gardiner was born in Edinburgh, the son of physician John Gairdner and his wife, Susanna Tennant. He was the elder brother of the historian James Gairdner. He was educated at the Edinburgh Institution and then in his father's profession at the University of Edinburgh, graduating as M.D. in 1845. Immediately after his graduation he went to Rome for six months. He was taught surgery by Prof Monro and Dr Robert Halliday Gunning.

== Medical career ==
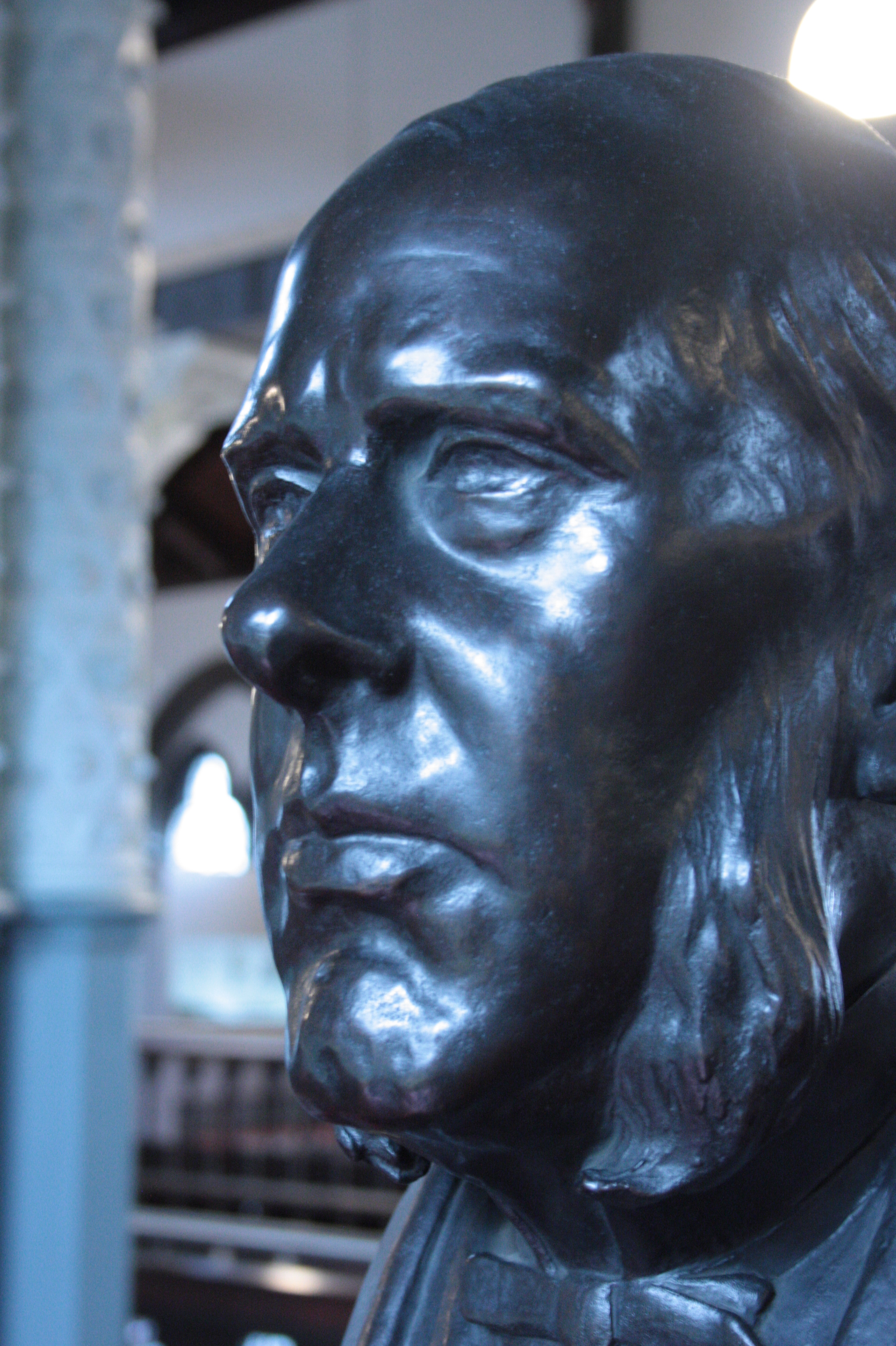
William Tennant Gairdner by Frank Baxter 1901, Hunterian Museum, Glasgow

In 1850 he was elected a Fellow of the Royal College of Physicians of Edinburgh; and a year or two later was appointed physician and pathologist to the Royal Infirmary of Edinburgh (RIE). During his time at the RIE he was a lecturer at the Edinburgh Extramural School of Medicine. In 1862 he accepted an invitation to take the professorship of medicine in the University of Glasgow, together with the post of physician to the Western Infirmary. In the following year much attention was directed in Glasgow to the insanitary state of the city; and Dr. Gairdner, at considerable pecuniary sacrifice, undertook the duties of medical officer of health, which he discharged for ten years in such a manner as brought about a total change in the conditions which he found existing. From this time forward he devoted himself to the duties of his professorship and to his increasing consulting practice.

Gairdner worked on sanitation, investigated diseases of the heart, and opposed the excessive use of alcohol to stimulate fevers, which was a practice popularized by Dr. Todd's teachings. His personal influence on successive generations of students was, however, more significant than his purely medical contributions.

In 1852 Gairdner was elected a member of the Harveian Society of Edinburgh and served as President in 1870. In 1893, he was elected President of the Royal College of Physicians of Edinburgh and a Fellow of the Royal Society The same year he was appointed honorary physician in ordinary in Scotland to Queen Victoria, receiving the corresponding appointment on the accession of King Edward VII. He was made Knight Commander of the Order of the Bath in 1898, and in 1890 resigned his professorship and took up his residence in Edinburgh.

He was president of the British Medical Association in 1888, representative of the University of Glasgow in the General Medical Council for ten years from 1893 to 1903, and among other distinctions received the degree of LL.D. Edin. in 1883 and that of M.D. Dublin (honoris causa), with the honorary Fellowship of the Royal College of Physicians of Ireland, in 1887. In 1900 he was elected a member of the Aesculapian Club, and in 1903 he received honorary degree of Doctor of Laws from the University of Glasgow.

== Works ==
His principal works were Clinical Medicine, 1862; Public Health in Relation to Air and Water, 1862; On Some Modern Aspects of Insanity, Lectures to Practitioners (jointly with Dr. J. Coats), 1868; The Physician as Naturalist, 1889; and The Three Things that Abide, 1903.

At the time of his death it was stated that "his book The Physician as Naturalist, if not written with any idea of self-portraiture, at least contains a large amount of self-revelation; while his last publication, The Three Things that Abide, is made up of lay sermons on faith, hope, and love, of no common interest and beauty."

== Personal life ==
In 1870, he married Helena Bridget Wright, of Norwich, Norfolk who survived him. He had four sons (William Henry Temple, Hugh Montgomerie, Eric Dalrymple, and Anthony Philip) and three daughters (Helen Christian, Ailsa Bridget, and Dorothea). Douglas Montagu Temple Gairdner was his grandson.

Academic offices
Preceded by Alexander Russell Simpson	President of the Royal College of Physicians of Edinburgh; 1893–1895	Succeeded by John Batty Tuke
