= List of killings by law enforcement officers in the United States, August 2024 =

A still from bodycam video depicting the killing of 17-year-old William Gardner in Baltimore, Maryland.

This is a list of people reported killed by non-military law enforcement officers in the United States in August 2024, whether in the line of duty or not, and regardless of reason or method. The listing documents the occurrence of a death, making no implications regarding wrongdoing or justification on the part of the person killed or officer involved. Killings are arranged by date of the incident that caused death. Different death dates, if known, are noted in the description. The table below lists 129 people.

== August 2024 ==
Date	Name (age) of deceased	Race	Location	Description
2024-08-31	Khasi Nikole Chrisley (33)	White	Christiansburg, Virginia	During a pursuit of a suspected armed robber, Montgomery County Sheriff's Office deployed spike strips which caused the suspect's vehicle to lose control and crashed into other vehicles. She later died in a hospital.
2024-08-30	Barbara Williams (78)	White	Plainfield, Indiana	During a pursuit, a Plainfield police officer struck an unrelated vehicle at an intersection. Two people in the vehicle died and the officer was injured. The suspect was arrested on September 16.
2024-08-30	Bennie Williams (79)	White	Plainfield, Indiana	During a pursuit, a Plainfield police officer struck an unrelated vehicle at an intersection. Two people in the vehicle died and the officer was injured. The suspect was arrested on September 16.
2024-08-30	Victoria Meza (43)	Hispanic	Beaumont, Texas	Meza reportedly fired shots at Beaumont Police officers while they were serving an arrest and search warrant on her. They returned fire, killing Meza. A dog was also killed during the incident.
2024-08-30	James Tighe Cushman (31)	White	Orchard Park, New York	Orchard Park Police received a report of a man with a knife and gun. Two officers shot and killed him as he advanced toward them with a knife.
2024-08-30	Douglas L. Plott (54)	Unknown	Alexandria, Ohio	Licking County Sheriff Deputies responded to a call and found the house on fire. They went in and fatally shot the suspect who attempted to stab his sister.
2024-08-29	Amir Jordan (19)	Black	Cincinnati, Ohio	While a Cincinnati police officer was responding to a serious injury crash with activated lights and sirens, he struck and killed Jordan, who was crossing the street.
2024-08-29	Brandon Evans (32)	Unknown	Chandler, Arizona	A suspect who was making suicidal statements fired a round with a gun in an alleyway. When the Chandler police officers came to investigate, he reportedly pulled out a gun and was shot.
2024-08-29	Christian Alexander Tyson Thomas (18)	Black	Cleveland Heights, Ohio	Cleveland Heights officers responded to a domestic dispute. They allegedly shot a man came out of the home through a screened porch window and also carrying a gun.
2024-08-29	Wallace Gonzales (41)	Unknown	Alamogordo, New Mexico	A New Mexico State Police officer stopped Gonzales during a traffic stop. He threatened to shoot the officer then fled the scene, which led to a pursuit that ended at White Sands Mall parking lot. A shootout occurred between Gonzales and LCPD SWAT team during the standoff which left him dead.
2024-08-29	unidentified male (26)	Unknown	Roanoke, Virginia	Roanoke Police responded to a call and found a woman with a serious cut. The woman directed officers to an apartment and they encountered a suspect armed with a knife. Officers shot and killed the suspect as he advanced toward them.
2024-08-29	Jennifer Provence (40)	White	Glenwood, Arkansas	A Pike County Sheriff's Office deputy shot and killed a woman who refused to drop a knife.
2024-08-29	Derik J. Trotter (33)	White	Coffeyville, Kansas	Coffeyville Police Department performed a traffic stop on a vehicle driven by Trotter to serve a search warrant. As they attempted to handcuff him, a physical altercation ensued and two officers deployed tasers and an officer shot him.
2024-08-29	Corey Cobb-Bey (30)	Black	Lewisville, Texas	A man wanted for shooting three police officers in Dallas, killing Officer Darron Burks, was shot and killed by Dallas Police officers following a chase. Police shot the man after he allegedly pointed a rifle at officers.
2024-08-29	Trent Weston (37)	White	Kittery, Maine/Portsmouth, New Hampshire	Weston, suspected of killing his wife in Troy, New Hampshire, was shot and killed by Maine and New Hampshire State Police on the Piscataqua River Bridge connecting New Hampshire to Maine. An 8-year-old boy, their son, was found shot to death in Weston's car.
2024-08-28	Juan Herrea Mejorado (43)	Hispanic	Carson City, Nevada	A teenager reported that his father stabbed his mother multiple times and cut himself severely. Upon arrival, Carson City Sheriff Deputies encountered two juveniles and the mother at a safe place. When they contacted with the father, a fight ensued and 2 deputies fatally shot him. The mother was listed in serious but stable condition.
2024-08-28	Andre Deon Haggray (30)	Black	Liberty County, Georgia	Liberty County Sheriff deputies responded to a domestic disturbance call. Upon arrival, a shootout occurred between Haggray and deputies in the woods. He then made his way to a dirt road and reportedly pointed his gun in the direction of the deputies before being fatally shot.
2024-08-27	Derrick Rankins (33)	Black	Stockbridge, GA	
2024-08-27	Cameron Ford (37)	Black	Omaha, Nebraska	Omaha Police SWAT team officers served a no-knock warrant at a home and fatally shot Ford when he ran towards them. Ford was unarmed when he was shot.
2024-08-28	Christian Demetri Moshofsky (33)	Black	Kent, Washington	Kent Police responded after a caller reported sounds of six to seven gunshots being fired. Upon arrival, officers believed the gunman was firing at them from an apartment complex. One officer returned fire. The suspected shooter, Moshofsky, was found dead inside the complex. Kent Police later confirmed that he died from a Kent Police shooting.
2024-08-27	Kenneth Grimm (77)	Unknown	Seguin, Texas	A Guadalupe County sheriff's deputy shot and killed a suspect who was suffering mental health crisis. Details are limited.
2024-08-27	Sina Chohili Sobby (22)	Asian	San Antonio, Texas	While ATF agents were serving a federal arrest warrant, one of them fatally shot Sobby, who was armed with a gun and reportedly pointed at them.
2024-08-27	Chad Owen Herman (58)	White	Asheville, North Carolina	
2024-08-27	Kim Lawong Crocker (58)	Black	Eastman, Georgia	Police received a report regarding livestock/animals in the roadway. Upon arrival, they encountered Crocker at the corner of the home with a gun. A shootout occurred which a deputy was shot and injured and Crocker was pronounced dead at the scene.
2024-08-26	unidentified male	Unknown	Panama City Beach, Florida	A fleeing suspect was tased and handcuffed by Panama City Beach Police. The suspect became unresponsive and was later pronounced deceased at a hospital.
2024-08-26	Rustin Lee Burke (39)	White	Follett, Texas	
2024-08-26	Jacob Daniel Bundy (39)	White	Beaverton, Oregon	Two Beaverton Police officers attempted to detain Bundy in a store. A struggle ensued and Bundy fired a gun. He was then shot by the police. The gun and the motorcycle he had driven were previously reported stolen in Vancouver, Washington.
2024-08-26	unidentified male	Unknown	San Diego, California	Officer Austin Machitar and a fleeing suspect was killed while another police officer Zachary Martinez, is in very serious condition after a crash. While officers were pursuing a fleeing vehicle, the suspect T-boned the officer's cruiser at a high rate of speed, which caused a multi-vehicle crash.
2024-08-25	Emmanuel Blanco Cruz (37)	Hispanic	Richardson, Texas	Officers reportedly shot and killed a man wielding a large knife after responding to a domestic disturbance call.
2024-08-25	Mark Francis Kelly (62)	White	New York City, New York	In East Harlem, Manhattan, the NYPD received a report of a man with a gun. They responded and encountered the man. The man refused to drop the gun and was fatally shot by two officers.
2024-08-24	unidentified male	Unknown	Valley County, Montana	A McCone County deputy saw two individuals arguing outside their vehicle. As he got out of the vehicle, one of them opened fire at him, prompting him to return fire, killing the shooter. Another individual was tased after he approached the deputy.
2024-08-24	Naimmikal Wayne Sanders (38)	Black	Huntsville, Alabama	Huntsville Police responded to a domestic disturbance call. Upon arrival, officers witnessed a man shooting at a fleeing woman. One officer discharged his weapon, killing him. The man was later identified as Sanders.
2024-08-24	Manuel Arteaga (42)	Hispanic	Beaumont, Texas	A man was fatally shot by an unknown number of Beaumont police officers after the he reported approached the officers with a chainsaw.
2024-08-24	Ricardo ‘Ricky’ Resendez Jr. (28)	Hispanic	Houston, Texas	An off-duty Harris County Deputy Constable involved in a car crash, which left a man dead.
2024-08-23	Billy Ray Factor (25)	White	Edmond, Oklahoma	Officers responded after the caller reported that an unknown person was in their backyard. Upon arrival, officers located the suspect on the caller's balcony. When they tried to talk with him, he pulled out a gun and shot at them before being fatally shot.
2024-08-23	James Dehart	White	Sacramento, California	Sacramento subdued and handcuffed Dehart before placing him inside a cruiser. He was later pronounced dead by paramedics on scene.
2024-08-23	Brayden Hemphill (17)	Unknown	Sugar Hill, Georgia	
2024-08-23	Kentrail Small (40)	Black	Lawrence, Indiana	
2024-08-23	Michael Hobbs (39)	Unknown	El Paso, Texas	
2024-08-23	Richard Phillip Randall Jr. (41)	Unknown	Altamonte Springs, Florida	Police shot and killed Randall, suspected of a felony, after he allegedly ran towards officers while holding an unspecified object.
2024-08-22	Kevin James Kennedy (44)	Unknown	Colquitt County, Georgia	
2024-08-22	Unnamed child	Unknown race	Science Hill, KY	
2024-08-22	Juan Diego Contreras (22)	Hispanic	Weslaco, Texas	Weslaco Police shot and killed Contreras, who turned around and reached for a shotgun while officers were making contact with him.
2024-08-22	Vernon Randle Jr. (27)	Black	Alton, Illinois	Randle Jr. was a suspect who shot and injured a woman on August 21. During the confrontation, he shot and injured an officer and killed police dog Odin before being fatally shot by returned fire.
2024-08-22	Juan Barbosa (41)	Hispanic	Mustang, Oklahoma	
2024-08-22	Julio Cordero (56)	Hispanic	El Paso, Texas	An El Paso Independent School District police officer shot and killed Cordero, a retired FBI agent, outside Franklin High School, where Cordero's son was a student. Few details were released, other than that the officer confronted Cordero for breaking windows at the school.
2024-08-21	Alex Gonzalez Jr. (30)	Hispanic	Hialeah, Florida	
2024-08-21	Michael Davies (59)	White	Layton, Utah	
2024-08-20	Angel Rojas (39)	Hispanic	Fresno, California	When CHP officers were investigating a stolen truck, they found Rojas sitting inside. When they tried to talk with him, he put the vehicle into reverse and rammed two of their unmarked patrol cars. He was then shot by them. A loaded gun was found in the truck. He died at the hospital 10 days later.
2024-08-19	Gerald Rahier II (42)	White	Grainfield, Kansas	
2024-08-18	Chris Cochran (60)	White	Bartow County, Georgia	
2024-08-18	Tias Dequan Cobb (25)	Black	Opelika, Alabama	Deputies responded to a call for service. Upon arrival, they encountered Cobb armed with a gun. An altercation ensued which led to the shooting.
2024-08-18	Alex Angel Cortez (16)	Hispanic	Chicago, Illinois	
2024-08-17	Denis L. Redondo-Zelaya (27)	Hispanic	Saint Clair, Missouri	
2024-08-17	Jeremy Lundgreen (47)	White	Roy, Utah	After a pursuit, Lundgreen reportedly confronted officers with a gun and fired at them. He was then killed after a shootout with police.
2024-08-17	unidentified juvenile	Unknown	Pulaski County, Kentucky	An off-duty officer collided with an off-road motorcycle, operated by a juvenile, who was not wearing a helmet. The juvenile was pronounced deceased at the scene.
2024-08-17	unidentified male	Unknown	Albuquerque, New Mexico	
2024-08-17	Michael Donnell Jones (54)	Black	Akron, Ohio	Two police officers approached a stolen U-Haul at a gas station, and demanded the suspect get out of the van. Suddenly, the suspect accelerated his vehicle while officers attempted to gain control. One of the officers fired two shots, killing the suspect.
2024-08-16	unidentified male	Unknown	Cibola County, New Mexico	Officers shot and killed a man who reportedly presented a threat.
2024-08-16	unidentified female (26)	Unknown	St. Louis, Missouri	
2024-08-15	unidentified male	Unknown	Mayfield, Kentucky	
2024-08-15	Curtis "CJ" Glen Purvis Jr. (31)	Unknown	Laurens County, Georgia	
2024-08-14	Timothy J. King (58)	White	Bonne Terre, Missouri	
2024-08-14	Alston Kaipo Awong (60)	Pacific Islander	Waianae, Hawaii	
2024-08-14	Robert Miller (61)	White	Virginia Beach, Virginia	
2024-08-13	Tyshawn Demmoris Barnes (28)	Black	Bertie County, North Carolina	Deputies attempted to serve an involuntary commitment order on Barnes. Barnes allegedly came out of the home and pointed a gun at officers and attempted to shoot. He then went back into the home and came back pointing a gun at them again, at which point officers fired at him, killing him. Barnes also fired shots at police during an incident in 2019.
2024-08-13	unidentified male	Unknown	Houston, Texas	
2024-08-13	Daniel McClelland (47)	Unknown	Palmetto, Florida	A man who was making suicidal statements was shot and killed by an officer after he pointed a rifle at them.
2024-08-13	Easter Leafa (16)	Pacific Islander	Anchorage, Alaska	Police were called to a home where a resident had reported her sister threatening her with a knife. Police encountered the girl, allegedly armed with a knife, and fatally shot her.
2024-08-12	R.J. Snodgrass (42)	Unknown	Summersville, West Virginia	Officers deployed spikes during a high speed pursuit, which led the suspect's vehicle to lose control, resulting 2 deaths.
2024-08-12	Adam Matthew Frazier (32)	Unknown	Summersville, West Virginia	Officers deployed spikes during a high speed pursuit, which led the suspect's vehicle to lose control, resulting 2 deaths.
2024-08-12	Kevin D. Price (28)	White	Fitchburg, Wisconsin	Fitchburg Police Department officers responded to a domestic dispute. Upon arrival, the suspect approached officers with a knife. One of the officers then shot him. He succumbed to his injuries on August 15.
2024-08-12	Mikhal Anthony Concepcion (20)	Hispanic	Warner Robins, Georgia	Officers responded to a report of a man with a gun. Upon arrival, they encountered Concepcion. He was shot to death after shooting at officers and tried to enter a home forcefully.
2024-08-12	Paul G. Behan Jr. (61)	White	Alexandria, Virginia	Upon responding to the Alexandria Overlook apartments, police were met in the stairwell by a man armed with a gun. After police demanded him to drop the weapon, the man opened fire, leading officers to return fire and kill him.
2024-08-11	Pedro Noe Sotelo (46)	Unknown	Thornton, Colorado	
2024-08-11	Asante Taaj Omar Miller (21)	Black	Columbus, Ohio	Police were dispatched to a home on a burglary in progress. The suspect then fled the scene. Officers located the suspect nearby, who was armed. Officers gave the suspect multiple verbal commands to drop his firearm. The suspect refused, which resulted in officers discharging their firearms. The suspect attempted to elude officers by forcing entry into another residence. While searching the residence, officers encountered the suspect hiding in a room, which resulted in additional shots being fired, killing him.
2024-08-11	Justin Brown (43)	Black	Long Beach, Mississippi	After an hours-long standoff and shootout with LBPD officers, Brown was found dead in the residence.
2024-08-11	Rodrick Edmond (47)	Black	Delhi, Louisiana	Officials stated that Edmond was operating a vehicle suspiciously in a police parking lot when officers approached him to investigate. A pursuit then ensued after he refused to stop. When he stopped on LA Highway 17. He allegedly got out the vehicle with a knife before officers shot and killed him.
2024-08-11	Marquavious Sims (26)	Black	Athens, Georgia	Officers responded to a report of a man with a machine gun and was waving it around. Upon arrival, they ordered Sims to drop it, however, he reportedly fired at them. Officers then returned fire, killing him.
2024-08-11	Dwayne Earl Johnson (18)	Black	Corpus Christi, Texas	Police were dispatched to an assault in progress. They encountered the suspect who then produced a handgun. One officer then fatally shot him.
2024-08-11	Sarah Jackson (85)	Unknown	Lowndes County, Mississippi	Jackson was killed in a collision with a Lowndes County Sheriff's Deputy.
2024-08-10	Albert William Park (54)	White	San Bernardino, California	An armed motorcyclist was shot and killed in a shooting during a pursuit.
2024-08-10	Garrett Ryan (30)	White	Sullivan, Missouri	The suspect allegedly walked toward the officers with a knife before being fatally shot.
2024-08-10	Imani Jackson (46)	Black	Phoenix, Arizona	Jackson reportedly fired a gun upon a group of people. Officers then conducted a traffic stop on him about a mile away. Jackson fled and reached towards his waistband for a handgun before being fatally shot.
2024-08-10	unidentified male	Unknown	Kaufman County, Texas	A deputy and an officer responded to a silent alarm at a convenience store. Upon arrival, the suspect fired at them, wounding them both. Then they returned fire, killing him. Both officers are expected to recover.
2024-08-09	Victor Delgadillo (18)	Hispanic	Anaheim, California	An Anaheim officer and other members of the Task Force shot and killed Delgadillo, who was wanted for a murder in Iowa. It is still unclear what led to the shooting.
2024-08-09	Timothy Wayne Goodman (65)	White	Smyth County, Virginia	A Marion officer attempted to make a routine traffic stop but Goodman did not immediately stop. He drove a mile and a half before pulling over at an intersection. When Deputy Hunter Reedy approached the vehicle, Goodman fatally shot him. A shootout then occurred which wounded another deputy and Goodman. Goodman died on August 16 and the wounded deputy is expected to recover.
2024-08-09	Nathan Jenkins (32)	Black	Cobb County, Georgia	Officers went to arrest a wanted suspect. Jenkins, who was allegedly armed with a firearm, was fatally shot.
2024-08-08	Joseph Fleming (29)	White	Palm Bay, Florida	Officers responded to an armed domestic disturbance. Upon arrival, gunshots was heard and the suspect came out of the residence and fired at police. Police then returned fire, striking him. A woman was found dead inside the residence. The suspect was transported to a hospital in critical condition and later died.
2024-08-08	unidentified male	Unknown	Dunklin County, Missouri	Multiple agencies were serving an arrest warrant on the suspect. During the encounter, the suspect pointed a gun at them before being fatally shot.
2024-08-08	Usher Leonard (25)	Black	Summit, Mississippi	At a checkpoint in Summit, a vehicle approached and the passenger fatally shot Officer Troy Floyd. Another two officers responded to the scene, a shootout occurred left the suspect dead and wounded both responding officers at a nearby grocery store. Details are limited about the driver.
2024-08-08	Jamie Lynn Still (45)	Unknown	Sumter County, Georgia	Still's family member called the police after he fired a gun at his home. Deputies arrived and Still reportedly pointed a rifle at them. He was then fatally shot by one of the deputies.
2024-08-08	Jacob Nathaniel Grebbien (40)	Unknown	Johnsonburg, Pennsylvania	The suspect had charges of terroristic threats filed against him. He was shot and killed after a standoff. It is unclear what led to the shooting.
2024-08-08	Tyrel Richter Cutchie (42)	Unknown	Colfax County, New Mexico	Officers responded after Cutchie allegedly ran someone off the road. When the State police arrived, Cutchie reversed his car into a parol vehicle before fleeing. His vehicle then stopped on the highway. When he wanted to leave, he collided with another state police cruiser, at which point, two deputies opened fire, killing him.
2024-08-08	Paul Parvea Montazer (37)	Asian	Irvine, California	Officers responded to a call about someone actively attacking a woman with a knife. Upon arrival, they shot and killed Montazer as he reportedly advanced toward them with the knife. The victim succumbed to her wounds, identified as Parvin Montazer, the suspect's mother.
2024-08-08	Tomas Ramirez (25)	Hispanic	Los Angeles, California	An off-duty officer witness a fight and tried to break it up. Two males involved the fight armed with a gun and a pipe respectively. Ramirez, who was the male armed with a gun, was shot and killed under unknown circumstances.
2024-08-07	Alexandria Gerard (43)	White	Albuquerque, New Mexico	Gerard died in a crash involving a BCSO unit.
2024-08-07	Austin Springer (25)	Unknown	Onyx, California	Deputies responded to investigate a restraining order violation. When they attempted to make contact with the suspect, an officer-involved shooting occurred which left the suspect dead. The suspect was reportedly armed with a firearm.
2024-08-07	Brandon Franklin Kizer (35)	White	Mesa, Arizona	Kizer allegedly stabbed a woman with a large knife. He was shot by the police after he moved back to the apartment with the knife. Less-lethal rounds were discharged but they were not effective. The woman sustained life-threatening injuries.
2024-08-07	Bo William Aurell (41)	White	Fort Worth, Texas	Aurell shot a deputy three times after deputies attempted to arrest them on child sex charges. Aurell then barricaded himself inside the home. At some point, SWAT officers entered the home and a shootout occurred, which left Aurell dead. The wounded deputy is expected to recover.
2024-08-07	Edmundo Meza (42)	Hispanic	Houston, Texas	HPD officers spotted two man near a gas station and learned one of them, Meza, had a warrant on him. While attempting to arrest him. They found that he was armed with a gun. A fight ensued for the gun and one officer opened fire, fatally striking Meza.
2024-08-06	Dennis Thornton (43)	Unknown	San Marcos, Texas	Officers received a report of a man acting erratically on top of the overpass. During the encounter, Thornton reportedly moved forward towards them and didn't follow their commands. Officers then tased him and put him into custody. When they attempted to speak with Thornton, he did not respond. He was then pronounced dead at a hospital.
2024-08-06	Floyd D. Caudill (40)	White	Golconda, Illinois	Illinois Department of Natural Resources were attempting to serve an arrest warrant. Caudill refused to exit his tent and a shot was fired. An officer then returned fire. Caudill was later found deceased.
2024-08-05	Aresly Anahi Jaramillo (20)	Hispanic	Dallas, Texas	Jaramillo was struck and killed by a squad car which was responding to a service call.
2024-08-05	Mychal Tanner Montalvo (31)	Hispanic	Tahoka, Texas	During a barricade situation, Montalvo shot at several SWAT vehicles and a K9 unit. At some point, he came out of the home and reportedly reached for a gun. He was then fatally shot.
2024-08-05	unidentified male	Unknown	West Haven, Utah	Officers responded to a call about a man was threatening self-harm. Upon arrival, they encountered a man holding two children hostage with a bladed weapon. When the man reportedly made statements to harm one of the children, Weber County Sheriff's Deputies fatally shot him.
2024-08-04	Phillip Reeder (52)	White	Irondale, Alabama	Reeder, a construction company owner, was driving home from a job in Memphis, Tennessee when a colleague called 911 to report he was having a medical emergency. When police arrived, Reeder was walking in and out of traffic. Officers handcuffed, restrained, and tased Reeder, who told police he couldn't breathe. He died, and his death was ruled a homicide.
2024-08-04	Christopher Baeza Morales (55)	Hispanic	Wright, Wyoming	A Campbell County Sheriff's deputy shot and killed a man allegedly wielding a shotgun.
2024-08-05	William Gardner (17)	Black	Baltimore, Maryland	Baltimore Police Department officers noticed an armed man, later identified as William Gardner. Gardner then began running away from the officers. As they were running after him, he displayed a gun at which point multiple officers opened fire, killing him.
2024-08-05	Aaron Matthew Shindle (47)	White	Irvine, California	Irvine Police shot and killed Shindle, suspected of driving a van into a home and stabbing a wheelchair-using man to death. According to the victim's family, Shindle was his former caretaker.
2024-08-05	Devon Anderson (38)	Black	South Fulton, Georgia	An off-duty Atlanta Police officer was arrested for shooting a man, Anderson, outside a bar where the officer was attending a birthday party. Witnesses said Anderson was attempting to diffuse an argument when the officer shot him.
2024-08-04	Julio Palomares (30)	Hispanic	Paramount, California	Los Angeles Sheriff's Deputies responded to a report of a family disturbance and battery. Upon arrival, they encountered Palomares with a pair of scissors. Palomares allegedly aggressively advanced toward them with the scissors, causing the officers to shoot him. A taser was deployed but it was not effective.
2024-08-04	Francisco Vasquez (57)	Hispanic	Stanton, Delaware	Vasquez forcibly entered a home and shot a man and a woman, the woman was killed and the man fled to a nearby gas station and reported the incident to the police. Vasquez then set the home on fire and fled the scene. Police later tracked him and found him on an electrical tower. He was shot and killed by Delaware State Troopers after firing a weapon at them. The male was uninjured.
2024-08-03	Adrian Cevallos (33)	Hispanic	New York City, New York	Cevallos, who was in the midst of a schizophrenic episode, was tased at least three times and handcuffed by NYPD during a struggle in Maspeth, Queens. He became unresponsive and died shortly after. His death was ruled a homicide by the medical examiner. The incident remained unreported until two years later in 2026 when the media found out. The Attorney General subsequently released the following footage.
2024-08-03	Jonathan Schutte (33)	Unknown	Hardin County, Tennessee	Hardin County Sheriff's Deputies encountered Schutte, a robbery suspect from Alabama. As they approached, Schutte allegedly fired a gun at them and was fatally shot.
2024-08-03	Angeleno Davonte Sykes (31)	Unknown	Rancho Cucamonga, California	After responding to a report of a man with a gun, a "lethal force encounter" occurred and Sykes was killed by San Bernardino County Sheriff's Deputies.
2024-08-03	Peter Christensen (51)	White	Martinsburg, West Virginia	Berkley County Sheriff's Deputies were called to assist the fire department with a large disturbance. While on the way to the scene, they collided with a Toyota Camry, which left Christensen dead. A deputy and another passenger suffered non-life-threatening injuries and serious injuries respectively.
2024-08-03	Christian Felix Gonzales (35)	Hispanic	Bastrop County, Texas	Bastrop County Sheriff's deputies responded to a shooting incident. Upon arrival, Gonzales allegedly fired at them before being fatally shot.
2024-08-02	Henry Sanders (41)	Black	Wyandanch, New York	Sanders died after being subdued and handcuffed by Suffolk County Police.
2024-08-02	William Ritchie (67)	Unknown	Pasadena, Texas	Pasadena Police shot a domestic violence suspect after he allegedly fired at officers approaching his home. He died from his injuries on August 4.
2024-08-02	Ladarius Walls	Black	Clarksdale, Mississippi	Clarksdale police officers were called to a traffic accident. Upon arrival, an altercation ensued and the suspect shot one of the responding officers, the wounded officer then returned fire, killing the suspect.
2024-08-02	Jerry Garcia (29)	Hispanic	Elk City, Oklahoma	Elk City police officers responded to a disturbance at approximately 7:00 p.m. When they arrived, they encountered Garcia brandishing a knife. Despite law enforcement's commands for Garcia to drop the weapon, Garcia refused, leading officers to shoot and kill him.
2024-08-02	Brandon Lena (47)	Native American	Oklahoma City, Oklahoma	Around 3 a.m., Oklahoma City Police responded to a disturbance call and they found a man having a mental health episode walking in the road with a weapon. Less-lethal rounds were discharged but they were ineffective. The suspect then reportedly pointed a gun at them, leading the officers to shoot.
2024-08-02	David Resmondo (49)	White	Madisonville, Tennessee	Madisonville Police responded to “an active shooter event”. According to officials, Resmondo fired shots in the parking lot and the building at Monroe County Justice Center. A deputy then shot and killed him.
2024-08-02	Rantavious Johnson (22)	Black	Memphis, Tennessee	Memphis police officer Demetrice Johnson and a driver was killed while another police officer Bobby Fields, is in very serious condition after a crash. According to new reports, Rantavious Johnson coming from the opposite direction on Danny Thomas veered into the officers lane before the fatal crash, also, he was shot during a previous incident unrelated. No one involved in the crash were wearing a seatbelt.
2024-08-01	Benjamin Wheeler (40)	White	Columbus, Ohio	Wheeler barricaded himself after Columbus police officers responded to a domestic violence situation. He allegedly stabbed and injured three officers before being fatally shot.
2024-08-01	Gabriel Rene Ramirez (22)	Hispanic	Prince William County, Virginia	Prince William County Police were called for reports of a suicidal person. Upon arrival, they found Ramirez at the backyard armed with a gun. The Crisis Negotiation Unite and an on-site Community Services clinician attempted to make him surrender peacefully but they failed. At some point, a SWAT member shot and killed Ramirez as he reportedly pointed the gun in the direction of officers.
2024-08-01	Lorie Martha O'Neal (49)	White	Chandler, Arizona	A Chandler police officer fatally shot O'Neal after she reportedly exited an apartment complex holding a firearm.
2024-08-01	Cris Steenblock (39)	White	Abilene, Texas	A person called 911 and reported to them that Steenblock was causing havoc with his parents at a house. When Abilene police officers approached the home, Steenblock purportedly approached with "weapons in both hands" and was fatally shot.

== See also ==
- Death in custody § United States
- Henry A. Wallace Police Crime Public Database
- List of cases of police brutality
- List of countries with annual rates and counts for killings by law enforcement officers
- List of law enforcement officers killed in the line of duty in the United States
- List of law enforcement officers convicted for an on-duty killing in the United States
- List of shootings by US immigration agents
- List of police reforms related to the George Floyd protests
- List of unarmed African Americans killed by law enforcement officers in the United States
- Lists of killings by law enforcement officers
- Police brutality in the United States
- Police misconduct § United States
- Police riot § United States
- Police use of deadly force in the United States
