= William Gardner (Australian settler) =

Pioneer and historian

- Born: 1802; Glasgow, Scotland
- Died: 10 September 1860 (aged 57–58); Oban Station, New South Wales
- Occupations: settler and historian
- Years active: 1838-1860
- Known for: Historical research
- Notable work: An inquiry into the effect produced by the deluge upon alluvial deposits of gold in Australia (1856)

William Gardner (1802–1860) was a pioneer settler and historian in New South Wales, Australia.

== Life and career ==
Gardner was born in Glasgow, Scotland, in 1802. He arrived in Sydney aboard the County Durham from Leith in April 1838. He worked in a store in Maitland before moving to the recently settled New England plateau. There he took a position as tutor at Saumarez station, in the employ of William Dumaresq.

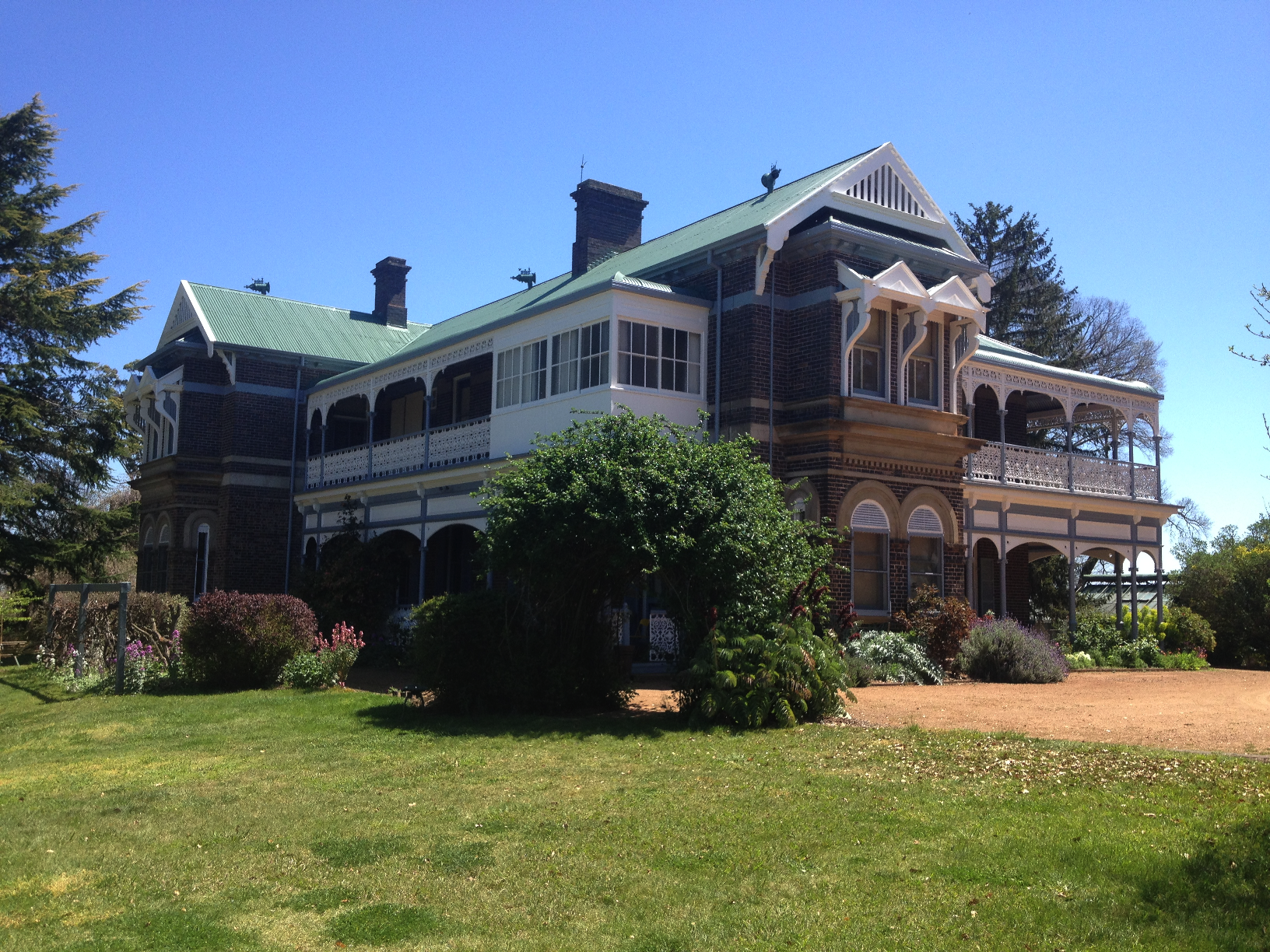
The main building at Saumarez Homestead, near Armadale, New South Wales

Gardner was a keen horseman and he travelled extensively over the district and compiled the first detailed map of northern New South Wales. This was published in Baker’s Australian County Atlas (1844). Gardner's map reveals competent draughtsmanship and detailed attention to roads, tracks and pastoral properties. The economic depression impacted his employer and saw Gardner leave Saumarez station.

His movements over the next few years are uncertain. He may have returned to Scotland. He certainly visited the United States where he visited cotton plantations in Georgia.

By 1848 he was back in Australia where he wrote and published, The cultivation of the cotton plant in New South Wales (1848 & 1850). He also published, An enquiry into the effect produced by the deluge upon alluvial deposits of gold in Australia (1856).

He worked as a tutor at Moredun (1853–1854), Rockvale (1854–1855), Mount Mitchell and Oban Stations (1858–1860). He died at the latter property, on 8 September 1860, of “dropsy of the chest,” after an illness of nine months.

He sketched and wrote about early homesteads and pastoralists in the region in large manuscript notebooks. These are now held by the Mitchell Library in Sydney and are a historical resource for the early settlement of northern New South Wales.
