= William Gardiner (Australian composer) =

Australian composer

William Gardiner is an Australian composer of electronic and acoustic music. He is known for his works in chamber music, symphony orchestra, and classical music ensembles, in addition to his electronic compositions. His most notable works are Hebbian Theory, Prism, and Hedgehog.

== Early life and education ==
William Gardiner was born in Sydney, New South Wales, into a family of early musical aficionados. He performed in classical music ensembles and also was a member of a rock band when he attended high school. Gardiner commonly played the violin and drums when he was younger, and later moved on to playing the guitar, piano (reworked piano) and composed electronic sound using technology. It was his involvement in music during high school that led him to compose his own music.

He studied art and law at University of Sydney, and later left Australia to study at Yale University to earn his doctorate degree in music, under the mentoring of David Lang.

== Career ==
During his studies and early career he was influenced by classical composers such as Bach, Astor Piazzolla, Latvian Pēteris Vasks, George Crumb and Alfred Schnittke; and was also inspired by the works of his fellow Australian composers Matthew Hindson, Paul Stanhope, Anne Boyd, Michael Smetanin and Damien Ricketson.

He then moved to New York to continue pursuing music, following the influential styles of artists like Animal Collective, Do Make Say Think, and Fausto Romitelli.

On 2 October 2014, Gardiner premiered his piece Hebbian Theory at the Morse Recital Hall in New Haven, Connecticut.

On 29 and 30 April 2015, he performed his orchestral arrangement of "Goldmines" by Josh Pyke at the Concert Hall in Sydney Opera House.

On 10 May 2015, he performed his piece called Hedgehog for electric guitar and a large chamber ensemble with fellow musician Jiyeon Kim on the guitar. This piece was performed at the Curtis Institute of Music during the Curtis Institute of Music's recital.

== Recognition ==
Gardiner was sponsored by the Ian Potter Cultural Trust to attempt to raise $7,000 to enter upon earning a Masters of Music in composition and work with David Lang for a year. The project dates ran from August 2011 to May 2012.

In July and August 2014, Lisa Moore performed her showcase titled Lisa Moore: From Me to You, where she performed Gardiner's piece "Little Room", for speaking/singing electronics and pianists at the Centre for New Music in San Francisco (20 July 2014), Dolphin Theatre in Perth, Western Australia (9 August 2014), and Melbourne Recital Center in Melbourne, Victoria (15 August 2014).

In 2015, Gardiner was awarded the '13 MM, '15 MMA of the National Composition Contest by American Composers Forum.

On 11 September 2015, was the premiere of New Work by Wild Up Modern Music Collective at the Roy and Edna Disney/Calarts Theater (REDCATS). This piece was accepted by the American Composers Forum as a piece to their 2015 National Composition Contest.

== Works ==
- Hebbian Theory is a composition of three movements (I. Hebbian Theory, II. Soma, and III. Long-Term potentiation) for amplified clarinet, violin, and piano trio. On 2 October 2014, this piece was performed live at Morse Recital Hall, Yale University by Gleb Kanasevich (clarinet), Ludek Wojtkowski (violin), and Miki Sawada (piano).
- Hedgehog was composed in 2012 for electric guitar, large amplified ensemble, and signal processing
- Arion is a musical piece for an orchestra that was composed in 2012.
- Prism is a piece for a string orchestra that was composed in 2012.
- Wish is a piece to be performed by a string quartet and is composed of three movements. This piece was developed in 2012.
- Cirrus was performed live at the Bang on a Can Summer Festival in Mass Mo CA in 2014.
- Onliving is a composition of four movements (I. Reverie, II. The Loving Bells, III. Running, and IV. Return) and was created in 2010.
