= William Gairdner (physician) =

Scottish physician and writer

- Born: 11 November 1793; Ayrshire
- Died: 28 April 1867 (aged 73); Avignon
- Occupation(s): Physician, writer

William Gairdner (11 November 1793 – 28 April 1867) was a Scottish physician and writer.

Gairdner was born at Mount Charles, Ayrshire on 11 November 1793. He was son of Robert Gairdner, a captain in the Bengal artillery. He was educated at University of Edinburgh and obtained he M.D. in 1813. He studied in London and worked as physician to the Earl of Bristol. He lived on Bolton Street, London and in 1823 was admitted a licentiate of the Royal College of Physicians.

In 1824, he authored Essay on the Effects of Iodine on the Human Constitution which supported Jean-Francois Coindet's treatment of goitre by internal administration of iodine. He authored On Gout, its History, its Causes, and its Cure in 1849, a work which went through four editions. It was an exposition of the main clinical features of gout and advocated treatment such as bleeding, moderate purgation, and the administration of colchicum. He married in 1822 and had one daughter.

Gairdner practiced medicine to the end of his life. He died at Avignon on 28 April 1867.

== Selected publications ==
- Essay on the Effects of Iodine on the Human Constitution (1824)
- On Gout: Its History, its Causes, and its Cure (1849, 1860)
