= Douglas M. Thornton =

English missionary (1873–1907)

Douglas M. Thornton (1873–1907) was an English Christian missionary to Cairo, Egypt with the Church Missionary Society from 1898 to 1907.

== Family ==
Douglas Thornton grew up in the county of Suffolk, England in a family that was well established in the Christian faith. Both his father, Rev. Claude Cecil Thornton, and his grandfather, Rev. Spencer Thornton, were dedicated clergymen and his mother also came from a deeply religious family. The devotion to faith seen in his parents and grandparents influenced him greatly toward a love for the Bible and for missionary work.

In 1899, one year after his arrival in Cairo, Thornton married Elaine Anderson and two years later in 1901 they had their only child – a son named Cecil.

== Education ==
After spending four years preparing at Marlborough College he left for Cambridge University in 1892. Beyond his formal learning in mathematics he threw himself heavily into Christian life and ministry in his university years. He immediately involved himself in the Cambridge Missionary Union as well as the Christian Union at the school which steadily evolved and joined with the more international Student Volunteer Movement largely due to Thornton’s influence.

Perhaps his greatest literary accomplishment was his creation of the magazine Orient and Occident which began in 1904. The magazine reached out to the educated members of society, but not only students. The regular magazine had illustrated articles addressing both religious and non-religious issues for both young and old readers in two languages.

== Last days ==
Douglas Thornton died of typhoid fever in 1907, his eighth year in Egypt. His final year was plagued with sickness and disappointment before a resurgence of energy, health and new excitement to begin a new ministry in Upper Egypt. Just before initiating this new ministry he fell ill once more and never recovered.

== Additional literary contributions ==
Beyond his vast literary contributions in Egypt in general, Thornton can be specifically remembered by a number of works. After gaining proficiency in the Arabic language, in 1902, Thornton meticulously edited and oversaw the printing of a new edition of the Arabic Prayer-Book in Cairo. His greatest and farthest reaching literary success came in publishing “Orient and Occident” beginning 1904. Before departing for Egypt and during his time on staff at the Student Volunteer Movement he also wrote a text book, or "missionary study" for Christian College Unions entitled Africa Waiting or the Problem of Africa's Evangelization.

== Source material ==
- Blessed Be Egypt: A Challenge to Faith for the Mohammedan World. Nile Mission Press, 1906. Pages 110-111.
- Gairdner, W.H. Temple. Douglas M. Thornton: A Study in Missionary Ideals and Methods. New York: Fleming H. Revell Company, 1909.
- Thornton, Douglas M. Africa Waiting or the Problem of Africa's Evangelization. New York: Student Volunteer Movement for Foreign Missions, 1900.
