= 1980–81 Liga Nacional de Hockey Hielo season =

Spanish ice hockey season

The 1980–81 Superliga Espanola de Hockey Hielo season was the ninth season of the Superliga Espanola de Hockey Hielo, the top level of ice hockey in Spain. Eight teams participated in the league, and CH Casco Viejo Bilbao won the championship.

== Final round ==
	Club	GP	W	T	L	Goals	Pts
1.	CH Casco Viejo Bilbao	20	16	1	3	242:70	33
2.	FC Barcelona	20	16	0	4	281:82	32
3.	CH Txuri Urdin	20	11	1	8	151:71	23
4.	CH Jaca	20	10	2	8	117:90	22

== Relegation ==
	Club	GP	W	T	L	Goals	Pts
5.	CG Puigcerdà	14	4	0	10	94:122	8
6.	CH Vitoria	14	4	0	10	63:149	8
7.	CH Boadilla	14	4	0	10	60:225	8
8.	CH Gel Barcelona	14	1	0	13	36:234	2
