= 2009–10 Liga Nacional de Hockey Hielo season =

Spanish ice hockey competition

The 2009–10 Liga Nacional de Hockey Hielo season was the 38th season of the top level of Spanish ice hockey. The season began with the dispute of the Copa de la Federación (Federation Cup), a preparatory tournament which was won by CH Jaca. The regular season of the Liga Nacional began on 24 October and ended on 31 January.

== Regular-Season Standings ==
2013–14 Liga Nacional de Hockey Hielo teams

División de Honor
Team	Pld	Wins	Losses	OTW	OTL	GF	GA	Pts
CG Puigcerdà (Puigcerdà)	8	7	0	1	0	73	36	23
CH Jaca (Jaca)	8	6	2	0	0	63	33	18
CHH Txuri Urdin (San Sebastián)	8	3	4	0	1	52	43	10
FC Barcelona (Barcelona)	8	3	5	0	0	34	50	9
Majadahonda HC (Majadahonda)	8	0	8	0	0	22	82	0

== Play-offs ==
The playoffs were best-of-five series and started on February 6, ending on March 7 with the final victory of CH Jaca.

Semi-finals
CG Puigcerdà	3
FC Barcelona	1
CH Jaca	3
CHH Txuri Urdin	0

Final
CG Puigcerdà	1
CH Jaca	3

After the end of the championship was decided the champion of the Copa del Rey, the last tournament of the season, which was won by CG Puigcerdà.
