= 2002–03 Liga Nacional de Hockey Hielo season =

Spanish ice hockey season

The 2002–03 Superliga Española de Hockey Hielo season was the 29th season of the Superliga Española de Hockey Hielo, the top level of ice hockey in Spain. Six teams participated in the league, and CH Jaca won the championship.

== Standings ==
#	Club	GP	W	OTW	OTL	L	Goals	Pts
1.	CH Jaca	15	14	0	0	1	104:36	42
2.	FC Barcelona	15	9	1	0	5	79:54	29
3.	CH Madrid	15	8	0	0	7	66:56	24
4.	CG Puigcerdà	15	7	1	0	7	64:70	23
5.	CH Gasteiz	15	3	0	2	10	35:71	11
6.	CH Txuri Urdin	15	2	0	0	13	40:99	1*

== Playoffs ==
=== Semifinal ===
- CH Jaca – CG Puigcerdà 2:1 (5:2, 4:6, 6:3)
- FC Barcelona – CH Madrid 2:0 (10:1, 3:2)

=== Final ===
- CH Jaca – FC Barcelona 3:0 (6:2, 8:3, 7:4)
