= 1988–89 Liga Nacional de Hockey Hielo season =

Spanish ice hockey season

The 1988–89 Superliga Espanola de Hockey Hielo season was the 15th season of the Superliga Espanola de Hockey Hielo, the top level of ice hockey in Spain. Six teams participated in the league, and CG Puigcerda won the championship. The league had not been contested since 1985-86, with only junior competitions being held in those years.

== Standings ==
	Club	GP	W	T	L	Goals	Pts
1.	CG Puigcerdà	20	16	1	3	205:57	33
2.	CH Jaca	20	15	2	3	173:52	32
3.	CH Txuri Urdin	20	14	1	5	162:81	29
4.	FC Barcelona	20	6	4	10	118:105	16
5.	CH Gasteiz	20	3	1	16	62:230	7
6.	CH Boadilla	20	1	1	18	59:254	3
