= 1982–83 Liga Nacional de Hockey Hielo season =

Spanish ice hockey season

The 1982–83 Superliga Espanola de Hockey Hielo season was the 11th season of the Superliga Espanola de Hockey Hielo, the top level of ice hockey in Spain. Six teams participated in the league, and CH Vizcaya Bilbao won the championship.

== First round ==
	Club	GP	W	T	L	Goals	Pts
1.	CH Jaca	10	9	0	1	96:50	18
2.	CH Vizcaya Bilbao	10	8	1	1	130:32	17
3.	CG Puigcerdà	10	6	0	4	84:54	12
4.	CH Txuri Urdin	10	4	1	5	89:57	9
5.	CH Gel Barcelona	10	2	0	8	51:117	4
6.	CH Boadilla	10	0	0	10	29:169	0

== Final round ==
	Club	GP	W	T	L	Goals	Pts
1.	CH Vizcaya Bilbao	16	13	1	2	183:52	27
2.	CH Jaca	16	13	1	2	165:88	25*
3.	CG Puigcerdà	16	7	1	8	112:97	15
4.	CH Txuri Urdin	16	5	1	10	112:117	11
