= 1979–80 Liga Nacional de Hockey Hielo season =

Spanish ice hockey season

The 1979–80 Superliga Espanola de Hockey Hielo season was the eighth season of the Superliga Espanola de Hockey Hielo, the top level of ice hockey in Spain. Eight teams participated in the league, and CH Txuri Urdin won the championship.

== Standings ==
| | Club | GP | W | T | L | Goals | Pts |
|---|---|---|---|---|---|---|---|
| 1. | CH Txuri Urdin | 14 | 13 | 0 | 1 | 203:39 | 26 |
| 2. | CH Casco Viejo Bilbao | 14 | 11 | 1 | 2 | 194:41 | 23 |
| 3. | FC Barcelona | 14 | 11 | 0 | 3 | 175:48 | 22 |
| 4. | CH Jaca | 14 | 8 | 1 | 5 | 166:54 | 17 |
| 5. | CH Vitoria | 14 | 5 | 0 | 9 | 74:170 | 10 |
| 6. | CG Puigcerdà | 14 | 3 | 0 | 11 | 50:155 | 6 |
| 7. | CH Boadilla | 14 | 3 | 0 | 11 | 63:196 | 6 |
| 8. | CH Gel Barcelona | 14 | 1 | 0 | 13 | 35:257 | 2 |
