= 2000–01 Liga Nacional de Hockey Hielo season =

Spanish ice hockey season

The 2000–01 Superliga Espanola de Hockey Hielo season was the 27th season of the Superliga Espanola de Hockey Hielo, the top level of ice hockey in Spain. Six teams participated in the league, and CH Jaca won the championship.

== Standings ==
	Club	GP	W	T	L	Goals	Pts
1.	CH Jaca	20	19	0	1	124:54	57
2.	CG Puigcerdà	20	11	1	8	97:74	34
3.	CH Gasteiz	20	9	2	9	80:72	29
4.	CH Txuri Urdin	20	7	2	11	72:104	23
5.	FC Barcelona	20	7	1	13	90:100	22
6.	CH Majadahonda	20	3	1	16	69:128	11

== Playoffs ==
=== Semifinal ===
- CH Jaca – CH Txuri Urdin 10:1, 5:2
- CG Puigcerdà – CH Gasteiz 6:3, 5:2

=== Final ===
- CH Jaca – CG Puigcerdà 3:1 (3:4, 6:3, 4:3, 6:2)
