= 1996–97 Liga Nacional de Hockey Hielo season =

Spanish ice hockey season

The 1996–97 Superliga Espanola de Hockey Hielo season was the 23rd season of the Superliga Espanola de Hockey Hielo, the top level of ice hockey in Spain. Six teams participated in the league, and FC Barcelona won the championship.

== Standings ==
	Club	GP	W	T	L	Goals	Pts
1.	CH Jaca	15	11	2	2	105:61	24
2.	FC Barcelona	15	11	0	4	84:57	22
3.	CG Puigcerdà	15	8	0	7	87:70	16
4.	CH Majadahonda	15	7	1	7	65:58	15
5.	CH Gasteiz	15	5	1	9	53:74	11
6.	CH Txuri Urdin	15	1	0	14	39:113	1*

== Playoffs ==
Semifinal
1	CH Jaca	2
4	CH Majadahonda	0
2	FC Barcelona	2
3	CG Puigcerdà	1

Final
1	CH Jaca	1
2	FC Barcelona	2
