= 2005–06 Liga Nacional de Hockey Hielo season =

Spanish ice hockey season

The 2005–06 Superliga Espanola de Hockey Hielo season was the 32nd season of the Superliga Espanola de Hockey Hielo, the top level of ice hockey in Spain. Seven teams participated in the league, and CG Puigcerda won the championship.

== Standings ==
	Club	GP	W	T	L	Goals	Pts
1.	CH Jaca	12	10	0	2	74:27	20
2.	CG Puigcerdà	12	9	1	2	83:27	19
3.	CH Val d'Aran Vielha	12	9	0	3	68:56	18
4.	FC Barcelona	12	7	1	4	51:42	15
5.	CH Madrid	12	2	1	9	25:65	5
6.	CH Txuri Urdin	12	2	1	9	31:66	3*
7.	Majadahonda HC	12	1	0	11	28:77	2

== Playoffs ==
=== Pre-Playoffs ===
- CH Txuri Urdin – CH Val d'Aran Vielha 2:0 (3:1, 4:1)
- CH Madrid – FC Barcelona 0:2 (4:5, 1:9)

=== Semifinals ===
- CH Txuri Urdin – CG Puigcerdà 0:2 (2:6, 2:9)
- FC Barcelona – CH Jaca 0:2 (6:7, 4:7)

=== Final ===
- CG Puigcerdà – CH Jaca 2:0 (5:4, 3:2)
