= 2004–05 Liga Nacional de Hockey Hielo season =

Spanish ice hockey season

The 2004–05 Superliga Espanola de Hockey Hielo season was the 31st season of the Superliga Espanola de Hockey Hielo, the top level of ice hockey in Spain. Seven teams participated in the league, and CH Jaca won the championship.

== Standings ==
	Club	GP	W	T	L	Goals	Pts
1.	CH Jaca	12	10	1	1	84:33	21
2.	CG Puigcerdà	12	10	0	2	71:21	20
3.	CH Txuri Urdin	12	6	2	4	44:43	14
4.	FC Barcelona	12	6	0	6	57:36	12
5.	CH Madrid	12	5	1	6	41:47	11
6.	CH Gasteiz	12	1	0	11	24:65	2
7.	Majadahonda HC	12	2	0	10	27:100	0*

== Playoffs ==
=== Semifinals ===
- CG Puigcerdà – CH Txuri Urdin 1:5
- FC Barcelona – CH Jaca 1:6, 0:3

=== Final ===
- CH Jaca – CH Txuri Urdin 3:0 (4:0, 5:3, 3:2)
