= 2008–09 Liga Nacional de Hockey Hielo season =

Spanish ice hockey season

The 2008–09 Superliga Espanola de Hockey Hielo season was the 35th season of the Superliga Espanola de Hockey Hielo, the top level of ice hockey in Spain. Seven teams participated in the league, and FC Barcelona won the championship.

== Standings ==
	Club	GP	W	OTW	OTL	L	Goals	Pts
1.	FC Barcelona	12	11	0	1	0	113:42	34
2.	CG Puigcerdà	12	9	1	0	2	91:46	29
3.	CH Jaca	11	8	0	0	3	67:38	24
4.	Anglet Hormadi Élite	11	5	0	0	6	56:59	14*
5.	Majadahonda HC	12	4	0	0	8	31:59	12
6.	CH Txuri Urdin	12	1	0	1	10	26:89	4
7.	CH Gasteiz	12	1	1	0	10	38:89	4*

== Playoffs ==
=== Pre-Playoffs ===
- CH Gasteiz – CH Jaca 0:2 (5:9, 1:10)
- CH Txuri Urdin – Majadahonda HC 1:2 (2:3, 6:5 SO, 1:4)

=== Semifinals ===
- Majadahonda HC – FC Barcelona 0:2 (1:6, 2:8)
- CH Jaca – CG Puigcerdà 1:2 (5:6 SO, 4:3 OT, 3:9)

=== Final ===
- CG Puigcerdà – FC Barcelona 0:2 (5:6, 2:5)
