= 1998–99 Liga Nacional de Hockey Hielo season =

Spanish ice hockey season

The 1998–99 Superliga Espanola de Hockey Hielo season was the 25th season of the Superliga Espanola de Hockey Hielo, the top level of ice hockey in Spain. Six teams participated in the league, and CH Txuri Urdin won the championship.

== Standings ==
	Club	GP	W	T	L	Goals	Pts
1.	FC Barcelona	15	10	2	3	77:47	22
2.	CG Puigcerdà	15	9	3	3	78:43	21
3.	CH Jaca	15	8	2	5	57:48	18
4.	CH Txuri Urdin	15	7	2	6	69:63	16
5.	CH Majadahonda	15	6	1	8	54:69	13
6.	CH Gasteiz	15	0	0	15	37:102	0

== Playoffs ==
Semifinal
1	FC Barcelona	0
4	CH Txuri Urdin	2
2	CG Puigcerdà	2
3	CH Jaca	0

Final
2	CG Puigcerdà	0
4	CH Txuri Urdin	2
