= 1997–98 Liga Nacional de Hockey Hielo season =

Spanish ice hockey season

The 1997–98 Superliga Espanola de Hockey Hielo season was the 24th season of the Superliga Espanola de Hockey Hielo, the top level of ice hockey in Spain. Six teams participated in the league, and CH Majadahonda won the championship.

== Standings ==
	Club	GP	W	T	L	Goals	Pts
1.	CH Jaca	15	13	2	0	103:63	28
2.	CH Majadahonda	15	7	2	6	90:88	16
3.	CH Gasteiz	15	6	3	6	68:70	15
4.	CG Puigcerdà	15	8	0	7	77:75	15*
5.	CH Txuri Urdin	15	5	1	9	79:87	11
6.	FC Barcelona	15	1	2	12	58:92	4

== Playoffs ==
Semifinal
2	CH Majadahonda	2
3	CH Gasteiz	0
1	CH Jaca	0
4	CG Puigcerdà	2

Final
2	CH Majadahonda	2
4	CG Puigcerdà	0
