= 2006–07 Liga Nacional de Hockey Hielo season =

Spanish ice hockey season

The 2006–07 Superliga Espanola de Hockey Hielo season was the 33rd season of the Superliga Espanola de Hockey Hielo, the top level of ice hockey in Spain. Six teams participated in the league, and CG Puigcerda won the championship.

== Standings ==
	Club	GP	W	T	L	Goals	Pts
1.	CG Puigcerdà	15	13	1	1	124:51	27
2.	CH Jaca	15	11	1	3	102:55	23
3.	CH Txuri Urdin	15	7	1	7	68:72	15
4.	CH Val d'Aran Vielha	15	6	2	7	78:77	14
5.	FC Barcelona	15	3	1	11	65:101	7
6.	Majadahonda HC	15	2	0	13	35:112	4

== Playoffs ==
=== Pre-Playoffs ===
- Majadahonda HC – CH Txuri Urdin 0:2 (1:5, 2:7)
- FC Barcelona – CH Val d'Aran Vielha 2:1 (5:3, 5:6 OT, 7:6)

=== Semifinals ===
- CG Puigcerdà – FC Barcelona 2:0 (4:2, 4:2)
- CH Jaca – CH Txuri Urdin 2:0 (4:3 OT, 6:4)

=== Final ===
- CG Puigcerdà – CH Jaca 2:0 (5:4 OT, 11:3)
