= 1983–84 Liga Nacional de Hockey Hielo season =

Spanish ice hockey season

The 1983–84 Superliga Espanola de Hockey Hielo season was the 12th season of the Superliga Espanola de Hockey Hielo, the top level of ice hockey in Spain. Four teams participated in the league, and CH Jaca won the championship.

== First round ==
	Club	GP	W	T	L	Goals	Pts
1.	CH Jaca	8	6	2	0	66:23	14
2.	CG Puigcerdà	8	4	3	1	61:33	11
3.	CH Vizcaya Bilbao	8	4	0	4	45:43	8
4.	CH Txuri Urdin	8	2	1	5	32:58	5
5.	CH Boadilla	8	1	0	7	40:87	2

== Final round ==
	Club	GP	W	T	L	Goals	Pts
1.	CH Jaca	14	9	3	2	98:49	21
2.	CG Puigcerdà	14	9	3	2	98:57	21
3.	CH Vizcaya Bilbao	14	7	1	6	83:78	15
4.	CH Txuri Urdin	14	2	1	11	55:103	5
