= 2024–25 Liga Nacional de Hockey Hielo season =

- League: Liga Nacional de Hockey Hielo
- Sport: Ice hockey
- Duration: 21 September 2024 – 29 March 2025
- Teams: 12

Regular season
- Best record: Club Hielo Jaca
- Runners-up: Club Gel Puigcerdà

Playoffs
- Finals champions: Club Gel Puigcerdà
- Runners-up: Club Hielo Jaca

Liga Nacional de Hockey Hielo seasons
- ← 2023–24 2025–26 →

The 2024–25 Liga Nacional de Hockey Hielo season was the 53rd season of the Liga Nacional de Hockey Hielo, the top level of ice hockey in Spain. The regular season ran from 21 September 2024 to 23 February 2025. Club Hielo Jaca finished atop the standings. The postseason ran from 1 to 29 March, 2025. Club Gel Puigcerdà defeated Club Hielo Jaca 3 games to 0 for the league championship.

== Teams ==
2024–25 LNHH team map

Team	City	State	Arena	Coach
Club Hielo Huarte	Huarte	Navarre	Palacio de Hielo Huarte	(Spain) Javier Casaus
Club Hielo Jaca	Jaca	Aragon	Pabellon de Hielo Jaca	(France) Benoît Pourtanel
Milenio Club Patín	Logroño	La Rioja	Pista de Hielo Lobete	(Finland) Timo Tuomi
SAD Majadahonda	Majadahonda	Madrid	Pista de Hielo La Nevera Majadahonda	(Spain) Fernando Maqueda
HC Porto	Porto	Portugal	Trofa Ice Arena	(Canada) Jim Aldred
Club Gel Puigcerdà	Puigcerdà	Catalonia	Palau de Gel de Puigcerdà	(Spain) Salvador Barnola
CHH Txuri Urdin	San Sebastián	Basque	Palacio de hielo Txuri-Urdin	(Spain) Luis Marcelino

== Regular season ==
=== Standings ===
Pos	Team	Pld	W	OTW	OTL	L	GF	GA	GD	Pts	Qualification
1	Club Hielo Jaca	18	16	1	0	1	123	35	+88	50	Qualification to Play-offs
2	Club Gel Puigcerdà	18	16	0	1	1	159	49	+110	49	Qualification to Play-offs
3	SAD Majadahonda	18	10	1	0	7	82	59	+23	32	Qualification to Play-offs
4	HC Porto (Note: HC Porto, being from Portugal, was ineligible to compete for the Spanish national ice hockey championship.)	18	9	1	0	8	88	74	+14	29	
5	CHH Txuri Urdin	18	3	1	3	11	48	88	−40	14	Qualification to Play-offs
6	Club Hielo Huarte	18	3	0	1	14	59	101	−42	10	
7	Milenio Club Patín	18	1	1	0	16	63	216	−153	5	

Updated to match(es) played on unknown. Source: Standings
Rules for classification: 1) Points; 2) Head-to-head points.

=== Statistics ===
==== Scoring leaders ====
Player	Team	Pos	GP	G	A	Pts	PIM
(Sweden) Julian Edström	Club Gel Puigcerdà	C	18	22	36	58	45
(Russia) Ignat Zemchenko	Club Gel Puigcerdà	C/RW	17	28	25	53	33
(Spain) Jaime Capillas	Club Hielo Jaca	C	18	20	26	46	16
(Spain) Ignacio Granell	Club Gel Puigcerdà	F	18	16	30	46	4
(Spain) Pablo Muñoz	Club Gel Puigcerdà	RW	17	17	23	40	12
(Spain) Joaquim Muratet	Club Gel Puigcerdà	C	18	12	28	40	24
(Netherlands) Ronald Wurm	HC Porto	LW/RW	16	13	26	39	12
(Spain) Adrian Torralba	Club Hielo Jaca	C	18	11	25	36	28
(Spain) Gaston Gonzalez	Club Hielo Jaca	D/RW	18	13	21	34	28
(Russia) Ivan Martynov	Milenio Club Patín	F	16	14	19	33	18

==== Leading goaltenders ====
The following goaltenders led the league in goals against average, provided that they have played at least 1/3 of their team's minutes.

Player	Team	GP	TOI	W	L	GA	SO	SV%	GAA
(Spain) Julio Rapun	Club Hielo Jaca	17	872	14	1	31	1	.903	2.14
(Spain) Raul Barbo	Club Gel Puigcerdà	15	811	12	2	35	0	.909	2.59
(Spain) Marco Hernandez	SAD Majadahonda	15	774	6	6	41	0	.895	3.18

== Playoffs ==
=== Championship ===
Semifinals (best-of-5)
1	Club Hielo Jaca	7	4	10	-	-
5	CHH Txuri Urdin	1	2	4	-	-
2	Club Gel Puigcerdà	6	6	5	3*	-
3	SAD Majadahonda	3	3	6**	2	-

Championship (best-of-5)
1	Club Hielo Jaca	2	1	1	-	-
2	Club Gel Puigcerdà	4	5	4	-	-

Note: * denotes overtime
Note: ** denotes overtime and shootout
