= 2012–13 Liga Nacional de Hockey Hielo season =

Spanish ice hockey season

The 2012–13 Liga Nacional de Hockey Hielo season was the 39th season of the Liga Nacional de Hockey Hielo, the top level of ice hockey in Spain. Six teams participated in the league, and CD Hielo Bipolo won the championship.

== Regular season ==
	Club	GP	W	OTW	OTL	L	Goals	Pts
1.	CD Hielo Bipolo	15	12	0	0	3	76:34	53
2.	CH Jaca	14	11	0	0	3	66:41	37
3.	CG Puigcerdà	14	9	0	0	5	88:57	30
4.	CH Txuri Urdin	15	6	0	1	8	64:70	26
5.	FC Barcelona	15	2	1	1	11	48:78	19
6.	Majadahonda HC	15	2	1	0	12	55:117	15

(Note: The game between CH Jaca and CG Puigcerdá at the end of the season was not played because both teams playoff positions were already determined.)

== Playoffs ==
=== Semifinals ===
- CD Hielo Bipolo - CH Txuri Urdin 2:0 (5:2, 4:1)
- CH Jaca - CG Puigcerdà 0:2 (4:5, 3:8)

=== Final ===
- CD Hielo Bipolo - CG Puigcerdà 3:0 (5:2, 5:3, 7:6)
