= 2010–11 Liga Nacional de Hockey Hielo season =

Ice hockey tournament season

The 2010–11 Liga Nacional de Hockey Hielo season was the 39th season of the national ice hockey league in Spain. The regular season of the Liga Nacional began on 18 September and ended on 22 January.

== Regular-Season Standings ==
2013–14 Liga Nacional de Hockey Hielo teams

División de Honor
Team	Pld	Wins	Losses	OTW	OTL	GF	GA	Pts
CH Jaca (Jaca)	12	11	1	0	0	107	36	33
FC Barcelona (Barcelona)	12	9	3	0	0	84	57	27
CG Puigcerdà (Puigcerdà)	12	6	5	1	0	67	65	20
Majadahonda HC (Majadahonda)	12	2	9	0	1	63	95	7
CHH Txuri Urdin (San Sebastián)	12	1	11	0	0	51	119	3

== Play-offs ==
The playoffs were best-of-three series and started on February 19, ending on March 12 with the final victory of CH Jaca.

Semi-finals
1	CH Jaca	15	11	-	2
4	Majadahonda HC	2	1	-	0
2	FC Barcelona	4	3	3	2
3	CG Puigcerdà	2	4	2	1

Final
CH Jaca	9	5	-	2
FC Barcelona	2	0	-	0
