= 1995–96 Liga Nacional de Hockey Hielo season =

Spanish ice hockey season

The 1995–96 Superliga Espanola de Hockey Hielo season was the 22nd season of the Superliga Espanola de Hockey Hielo, the top level of ice hockey in Spain. Five teams participated in the league, and CH Jaca won the championship.

== Standings ==
| | Club | GP | W | T | L | Goals | Pts |
|---|---|---|---|---|---|---|---|
| 1. | CH Txuri Urdin | 16 | 12 | 0 | 4 | 92:47 | 24 |
| 2. | CG Puigcerdà | 16 | 8 | 2 | 6 | 92:49 | 18 |
| 3. | CH Jaca | 16 | 8 | 2 | 6 | 88:69 | 18 |
| 4. | FC Barcelona | 16 | 8 | 2 | 6 | 105:62 | 18 |
| 5. | CH Gasteiz | 16 | 1 | 0 | 15 | 25:170 | 2 |

== Playoffs ==
Semifinal
2 | CG Puigcerdà | 0
3 | CH Jaca | 2
1 | CH Txuri Urdin | 1
4 | FC Barcelona | 2

Final
3 | CH Jaca | 2
4 | FC Barcelona | 0
