= 2011–12 Liga Nacional de Hockey Hielo season =

Spanish ice hockey season

The 2011–12 Liga Nacional de Hockey Hielo season was the 38th season of the Liga Nacional de Hockey Hielo, the top level of ice hockey in Spain. Six teams participated in the league, and CH Jaca won the championship.

== Regular season ==
	Club	GP	W	OTW	OTL	L	Goals	Pts
1.	CH Jaca	20	17	1	0	2	134:71	53
2.	CG Puigcerdà	20	11	1	2	6	100:81	37
3.	FC Barcelona	20	10	0	0	10	86:86	30
4.	CH Txuri Urdin	20	7	2	1	10	79:90	26
5.	CH Gasteiz	20	6	0	1	13	89:126	19
6.	Majadahonda HC	20	4	1	1	14	99:133	15

== Playoffs ==
=== Semifinals ===
- CH Jaca - CH Txuri Urdin 2:1 (3:4 OT, 7:0, 5:3)
- CG Puigcerdà - FC Barcelona 2:0 (4:1, 5:2)

=== Final ===
- CH Jaca - CG Puigcerdà 3:1 (8:7, 5:1, 1:4, 4:2)
