= 2013–14 Liga Nacional de Hockey Hielo season =

2013–14 Liga Nacional 1ª División
Tournament details
- Host country: Spain
- Dates: September 21, 2013–March 16, 2014
- Teams: 6

Final positions
- Champions: Escor BAKH (2nd title)
- Runners-up: Puigcerdà

The 2013–14 Liga Nacional de Hockey Hielo season was the 40th season of the Liga Nacional de Hockey Hielo, the top level of ice hockey in Spain. Six teams participated in the league, and CD Hielo Bipolo won the championship.

== Teams ==
2013–14 Liga Nacional de Hockey Hielo teams

Team	City/Area	Stadium	Capacity
FC Barcelona	Barcelona	Pista de Gel	1,256
Aramón Jaca	Jaca	Pabellón de Hielo	1,900
Majadahonda	Majadahonda	Palacio del Hielo	350
Puigcerdà	Puigcerdà	Pista de Gel	1,456
Txuri Urdin	San Sebastián	Palacio del Hielo	650
Escor BAKH	Vitoria-Gasteiz	Bakh	500

== Regular season standings ==
Team	Pld	W	OTW	OTL	L	GF	GA	GD	Pts	Qualification
Escor BAKH	20	18	0	0	2	134	49	+85	54	Advanced to Championship Finals
Puigcerdà	20	12	2	2	4	110	71	+39	42	Advanced to Championship Finals
Txuri Urdin	20	9	0	3	8	99	78	+21	30	Advanced to Championship Finals
Aramón Jaca	20	7	1	1	11	73	103	−30	24	Advanced to Championship Finals
FC Barcelona	20	5	3	0	12	71	101	−30	21	
SAD Majadahonda	20	3	0	0	17	71	156	−85	9	

== Playoffs ==
Semifinals
1	Escor BAKH	5	3	7
4	Aramón Jaca	3	4	0
2	Puigcerdà	10	3
3	Txuri Urdin	5	2

Final
1	Escor BAKH	6	5	2	5
2	Puigcerdà	2	1	5	2

=== Semifinals ===
==== 1st leg ====
22 February 2014; 21:00 (UTC+1)	Aramón Jaca	3–5 (0–2, 1–1, 2–2)	Escor BAKH	Pista Hielo del Pirineo

Game reference
Referee: (Russia) Alexey Roshchyn; Linesmen: (Spain) Carlos Trobajo (Spain) Isidro Quintero

22 February 2014; 22:00 (UTC+1)	Txuri Urdin	5–10 (1–2, 0–5, 4–3)	Puigcerdà	Palacio del Hielo Txuri Urdin

Game reference
Referee: (Spain) Fernando Pablo Calvo; Linesmen: (Spain) Ion Doméc (Spain) Diego Lobón

==== 2nd leg ====
1 March 2014; 20:30 (UTC+1)	Escor BAKH	3–4 (2–1, 1–2, 0–1)	Aramón Jaca	Pista de Hielo BAKH

Game reference

1 March 2014; 21:30 (UTC+1)	Puigcerdà	3–2 OT (0–1, 1–1, 1–0) (OT: 1–0)	Txuri Urdin	Pista de Gel de Puigcerdà

Game reference

==== 3rd leg ====
2 March 2014; 14:00 (UTC+1)	Escor BAKH	7–0 (3–0, 3–0, 1–0)	Aramón Jaca	Pista de Hielo BAKH

Game reference

=== Final ===
==== 1st leg ====
8 March 2014; 20:30 (UTC+1)	Escor BAKH	6–2 (3–0, 2–0, 1–2)	Puigcerdà	Pista de Hielo BAKH; Attendance: 500

Game reference
Referee: (Russia) Alexey Roshchyn; Linesmen: (Spain) Sergio Biec (Spain) Alejandro García

==== 2nd leg ====
9 March 2014; 17:30 (UTC+1)	Escor BAKH	5–1 (2–0, 2–1, 1–0)	Puigcerdà	Pista de Hielo BAKH; Attendance: 504

Game reference
Referee: (Spain) Richard Vea; Linesmen: (Spain) Sergio Biec (Spain) Alejandro García

==== 3rd leg ====
15 March 2014; 21:30 (UTC+1)	Puigcerdà	5–2 (2–0, 2–1, 1–0)	Escor BAKH	Pista de Gel de Puigcerdà; Attendance: 380

Game reference
Referee: (Spain) Fernando Pablo Calvo; Linesmen: (Spain) Sergio Biec (Spain) Carlos Trobajo

==== 4th leg ====
16 March 2014; 18:00 (UTC+1)	Puigcerdà	2–5 (0–2, 1–0, 1–3)	Escor BAKH	Pista de Gel de Puigcerdà; Attendance: 500

Game reference
Referee: (Spain) Fernando Pablo Calvo; Linesmen: (Spain) Sergio Biec (Spain) Carlos Trobajo

2013–14 Liga Nacional de Hockey Hielo winners
(Basque Country (autonomous community))
Escor BAKH
Second title
