= 1981–82 Liga Nacional de Hockey Hielo season =

Spanish ice hockey season

The 1981–82 Superliga Espanola de Hockey Hielo season was the 10th season of the Superliga Espanola de Hockey Hielo, the top level of ice hockey in Spain. Six teams participated in the league, and CH Vizcaya Bilbao won the championship.

== Standings ==
	Club	GP	W	T	L	Goals	Pts
1.	CH Vizcaya Bilbao	20	18	1	1	213:56	37
2.	FC Barcelona	20	17	1	2	214:50	35
3.	CH Jaca	20	11	0	9	107:82	22
4.	CG Puigcerdà	20	8	0	12	96:132	16
5.	CH Txuri Urdin	20	4	0	16	85:182	8
6.	CH Vitoria	20	1	0	19	53:268	2
