= 2007–08 Liga Nacional de Hockey Hielo season =

Spanish ice hockey season

The 2007–08 Superliga Espanola de Hockey Hielo season was the 34th season of the Superliga Espanola de Hockey Hielo, the top level of ice hockey in Spain. Six teams participated in the league, and CG Puigcerda won the championship.

== Standings ==
	Club	GP	W	OTW	OTL	L	Goals	Pts
1.	CG Puigcerdà	10	9	1	0	0	76:27	29
2.	Anglet Hormadi Élite	10	7	1	1	1	68:24	24
3.	FC Barcelona	10	6	0	1	3	60:42	19
4.	CH Txuri Urdin	10	4	0	0	6	46:70	12
5.	CH Gasteiz	10	2	0	0	8	30:67	6
6.	Majadahonda HC	10	1	0	0	9	20:70	3

== Playoffs ==
=== Pre-Playoffs ===
- CH Gasteiz – CH Txuri Urdin 2:0 (6:3, 3:2 OT)
- Majadahonda HC – FC Barcelona 0:2 (1:9, 1:11)

=== Semifinals ===
- Anglet Hormadi Élite – FC Barcelona 2:0 (5:2, 5:3)
- CH Gasteiz – CG Puigcerdà 0:2 (4:7, 4:13)

=== Final ===
- Anglet Hormadi Élite – CG Puigcerdà 0:2 (6:7, 6:8)
