= Iberian Ice Hockey League =

Competition among the ice hockey clubs from Andorra, Portugal and Spain

Iberian Ice Hockey League Liga Ibérica de Hóquei no Gelo Liga Ibérica de Hockey Hielo
- Sport: Ice hockey
- Founded: 2024; 2 years ago
- Founder: Portuguese Winter Sports Federation & Royal Spanish Winter Sports Federation
- No. of teams: 8
- Country: Andorra (1 team); Portugal (1 team); Spain (7 teams)
- Continent: Europe
- Most recent champion: Jaca (2024–25)
- Most titles: Jaca (1)
- Related competitions: Liga Nacional de Hockey Hielo

The Iberian Ice Hockey League (Portuguese: Liga Ibérica de Hóquei no Gelo, Spanish: Liga Ibérica de Hockey Hielo) is the top men's ice hockey competition based in the Iberian Peninsula, featuring teams from Andorra, Portugal and Spain.

== History ==
The foundations of a pan-Iberian competition began in October 2023 following a proposal made between the Portuguese Winter Sports Federation, Royal Spanish Winter Sports Federation and International Ice Hockey Federation (IIHF) President Luc Tardif at the IIHF’s Semi-Annual Congress in Vilamoura. The agreement allowed HC Porto to become the first Portuguese team to join the Spanish Liga Nacional de Hockey Hielo (LNHH), however LNHH regulations regarding each team icing a minimum number of Spanish players meant that the Portuguese team were ineligible to qualify for the post-season championship playoff, limiting the team to regular season games only.

Porto's inaugural season met with some success–finishing in fourth place out of a total of seven teams–and therefore, on 13 September 2024, the Portuguese and Spanish Winter Sport Federations jointly announced the creation of a new competition: the Iberian Ice Hockey League. The new competition would feature Porto alongside the six leading Spanish teams from the existing LNHH; Huarte, Jaca, Majadahonda, Milenio Logroño, Puigcerdà and Txuri Urdin, with the prospect of additional teams joining in the future.

The inaugural 2024–2025 season featured 7 teams playing 63 games across 21 rounds, with 15-time Spanish champions Jaca being crowned as the first winners of the new tournament.

In August 2025, ahead of the second edition of the competition, the league announced an expansion to 9 teams with the addition of three teams–FC Barcelona and Madrid along with its first team based in Andorra: Andorra Hoquei Gel–whilst simultaneously announcing the withdrawal of Huarte. In January 2026, mid-way through the 2025–26 season, Milenio Logroño withdrew from the competition due to a visa renewal crisis that left the club without key foreign players.

== Format ==
For the inaugural 2024–2025 season, the competition format consists of a 21-round regular season, after which the top-placed team in the standings is crowned Iberian League champions.

The league co-exists with the Spanish Liga Nacional de Hockey Hielo (LNHH); following the end of the Iberian League season, the four highest placed Spanish-based teams advance to a post-season playoff to determine the Spanish national champions.

== Teams ==
Current Teams (2025–2026 season)
Team	City	Arena	Capacity	Founded	Years
Andorra Hoquei Gel	(Andorra) Canillo	Palau de Gel d'Andorra	1,500	1990	2025–present
FC Barcelona	(Spain) Barcelona	Palau de Gel	1,256	1972	2025–present
Jaca	(Spain) Jaca	Pabellón de Hielo de Jaca	2,000	1972	2024–present
Madrid	(Spain) Madrid	Pista de Hielo de Madrid	1,500	1972	2025–present
Majadahonda	(Spain) Majadahonda	Pista de Hielo La Nevera	350	1992	2024–present
Porto	(Portugal) Porto	Trofa Ice Arena	600	2023	2024–present
Puigcerdà	(Spain) Puigcerdà	Club Poliesportiu Puigcerdà	1,456	1956	2024–present
Txuri Urdin	(Spain) San Sebastián	Palacio de Hielo Txuri Urdin	650	1972	2025–present
Former Teams
Team	City	Arena	Capacity	Founded	Years
Huarte	(Spain) Huarte	Palacio de Hielo de Huarte	500	2014	2024–2025
Milenio Logroño	(Spain) Logroño	Centro Deportivo Municipal Lobete	800	2005	2024–2026

== Champions ==
Season	Iberian League Champion
2024–25	(Spain) Jaca
