= 1999–2000 Liga Nacional de Hockey Hielo season =

Spanish ice hockey season

The 1999–2000 Superliga Espanola de Hockey Hielo season was the 26th season of the Superliga Espanola de Hockey Hielo, the top level of ice hockey in Spain. Six teams participated in the league, and CH Txuri Urdin won the championship.

== Standings ==
	Club	GP	W	T	L	Goals	Pts
1.	CH Jaca	15	12	2	1	129:51	26
2.	CG Puigcerdà	15	9	5	1	99:45	23
3.	CH Txuri Urdin	14	7	3	4	84:62	17
4.	CH Majadahonda	15	5	1	9	46:83	11
5.	FC Barcelona	15	4	3	8	71:76	11
6.	CH Gasteiz	14	0	0	14	20:132	0

== Playoffs ==
=== Semifinal ===
- CH Majadahonda – CH Jaca 6:8, 5:6
- CH Txuri Urdin – CG Puigcerdà 8:6, 3:4

=== Final ===
- CH Txuri Urdin – CH Jaca 4:3, 1:5, 4:3
