= 1989–90 Liga Nacional de Hockey Hielo season =

Spanish ice hockey season

The 1989–90 Superliga Espanola de Hockey Hielo season was the 16th season of the Superliga Espanola de Hockey Hielo, the top level of ice hockey in Spain. Six teams participated in the league, and CH Txuri Urdin won the championship.

== First round ==
	Club	GP	W	T	L	Goals	Pts
1.	CG Puigcerdà	10	8	1	1	114:34	17
2.	CH Txuri Urdin	10	8	1	1	119:36	17
3.	CH Jaca	10	7	0	3	76:40	14
4.	FC Barcelona	10	4	0	6	65:57	8
5.	CH Gasteiz	10	1	0	9	29:134	2
6.	CH Boadilla	10	1	0	9	11:123	2

== Final round ==
	Club	GP	W	T	L	Goals	Pts
1.	CH Txuri Urdin	16	14	1	1	178:58	29
2.	CH Jaca	16	11	0	5	120:62	22
3.	CG Puigcerdà	16	8	1	7	133:76	16*
4.	FC Barcelona	16	6	0	10	102:101	12
5.	CH Boadilla	16	5	0	11	61:166	10
6.	CH Gasteiz	16	3	0	13	54:185	6
