= 1991–92 Liga Nacional de Hockey Hielo season =

Spanish ice hockey season

The 1991–92 Superliga Espanola de Hockey Hielo season was the 18th season of the Superliga Espanola de Hockey Hielo, the top level of ice hockey in Spain. Five teams participated in the league, and CH Txuri Urdin won the championship.

== Standings ==
	Club	GP	W	T	L	Goals	Pts
1.	CH Txuri Urdin	16	12	1	3	106:59	25
2.	CH Jaca	16	10	1	5	81:72	21
3.	FC Barcelona	16	9	0	7	131:81	18
4.	CG Puigcerdà	16	7	2	7	94:68	16
5.	CH Gasteiz	16	0	0	16	56:160	0
