= 1984–85 Liga Nacional de Hockey Hielo season =

Spanish ice hockey season

The 1984–85 Superliga Espanola de Hockey Hielo season was the 13th season of the Superliga Espanola de Hockey Hielo, the top level of ice hockey in Spain. Six teams participated in the league, and CH Txuri Urdin won the championship.

== First round ==
	Club	GP	W	T	L	Goals	Pts
1.	CH Jaca	10	8	1	1	101:28	17
2.	CH Txuri Urdin	10	7	1	2	113:34	15
3.	CG Puigcerdà	10	7	0	3	141:43	14
4.	CH Vizcaya Bilbao	10	5	0	5	87:59	9*
5.	CH Vitoria	10	2	0	8	45:138	4
6.	CH Boadilla	10	0	0	10	22:207	0

== Final round ==
	Club	GP	W	T	L	Goals	Pts
1.	CH Txuri Urdin	16	11	3	2	159:59	25
2.	CH Jaca	16	10	3	3	135:57	23
3.	CG Puigcerdà	16	9	2	5	168:79	20
4.	CH Vizcaya Bilbao	16	6	0	10	117:106	12
