= 1993–94 Liga Nacional de Hockey Hielo season =

Spanish ice hockey season

The 1993–94 Superliga Espanola de Hockey Hielo season was the 20th season of the Superliga Espanola de Hockey Hielo, the top level of ice hockey in Spain. Five teams participated in the league, and CH Jaca won the championship.

== Standings ==
	Club	GP	W	T	L	Goals	Pts
1.	CH Jaca	16	13	1	2	164:49	27
2.	CH Txuri Urdin	16	12	1	3	149:58	25
3.	CG Puigcerdà	16	10	0	6	111:58	20
4.	FC Barcelona	16	4	0	12	63:106	8
5.	CH Gasteiz	16	0	0	16	25:241	0
