= 1994–95 Liga Nacional de Hockey Hielo season =

Spanish ice hockey season

The 1994–95 Superliga Espanola de Hockey Hielo season was the 21st season of the Superliga Espanola de Hockey Hielo, the top level of ice hockey in Spain. Five teams participated in the league, and CH Txuri Urdin won the championship.

== First round ==
	Club	GP	W	T	L	Goals	Pts
1.	CH Txuri Urdin	8	8	0	0	86:19	16
2.	CH Jaca	8	5	0	3	64:28	10
3.	FC Barcelona	8	4	0	4	42:45	8
4.	CG Puigcerdà	8	3	0	5	33:41	6
5.	CH Gasteiz	8	0	0	8	17:109	0

== Playoffs ==
Semi-finals
CH Txuri Urdin	2
CG Puigcerdà	1
CH Jaca	2
FC Barcelona	0

Final
CH Txuri Urdin	1
CH Jaca	0
Third place
FC Barcelona	0
CG Puigcerdà	1
