= 2003–04 Liga Nacional de Hockey Hielo season =

Spanish ice hockey season

The 2003–04 Superliga Espanola de Hockey Hielo season was the 30th season of the Superliga Espanola de Hockey Hielo, the top level of ice hockey in Spain. Six teams participated in the league, and CH Jaca won the championship.

== Standings ==
	Club	GP	W	OTW	OTL	L	Goals	Pts
1.	CH Jaca	15	13	1	1	0	107:29	42
2.	CG Puigcerdà	15	10	0	1	4	81:49	31
3.	CH Gasteiz	14	8	0	0	6	41:52	24
4.	CH Txuri Urdin	14	5	2	0	7	47:61	19
5.	CH Madrid	15	2	2	1	10	36:66	11
6.	FC Barcelona	15	2	0	2	11	30:85	8

== Playoffs ==
=== Semifinals ===
- CH Jaca – CH Txuri Urdin 2:0 (11:2, 5:2)
- CG Puigcerdà – CH Gasteiz 2:1 (4:3 OT, 1:3, 6:1)

=== Final ===
- CH Jaca – CG Puigcerdà 3:0 (6:5, 4:3, 3:2 OT)
