= Ramil Yuldashev =

- Born: September 5, 1961 (age 65)
- Height: 5 ft 9 in (175 cm)
- Weight: 163 lb (74 kg; 11 st 9 lb)
- Position: Right wing
- Played for: Ufa Salavat Yulayev (USSR); Sokil Kyiv (USSR); EHC Biel (SUI-A); Gothiques d'Amiens (FRA); Bolzano HC (ITA)
- National team: Soviet Union and Ukraine
- Playing career: 1978–2005

Ramil Yuldashev (born September 5, 1961 in Ufa, Bashkir ASSR) is a Ukrainian retired ice hockey winger who played the majority of his career in the Soviet Championship League with Salavat Yulayev Ufa and Sokil Kyiv. He led the league in scoring in 1990–91 with 36 goals and 56 points in 46 games. He played four games for the Soviet Union in 1990 and then played later for Ukraine. He was named best forward at the 1993 C Pool World Championships and was the highest goal scorer at the 1994 C Pool World Championships.

== Career statistics ==
=== Regular season and playoffs ===
			Regular season					Playoffs
Season	Team	League	GP	G	A	Pts	PIM	GP	G	A	Pts	PIM
1978–79	Salavat Yulaev Ufa	USSR	4	0	0	0	2	—	—	—	—	—
1978–79	Lada Togliatti	USSR III	19	7	6	13	23	—	—	—	—	—
1979–80	Salavat Yulaev Ufa	USSR II	60	24	9	33	32	—	—	—	—	—
1980–81	Salavat Yualev Ufa	USSR	44	18	4	22	12	—	—	—	—	—
1981–82	Salavat Yulaev Ufa	USSR II	53	60	15	75	18	—	—	—	—	—
1982–83	Salavat Yualev Ufa	USSR	40	16	8	24	12	—	—	—	—	—
1983–84	Salavat Yulaev Ufa	USSR II	58	37				—	—	—	—	—
1984–85	Sokil Kyiv	USSR	40	21	10	31	22	—	—	—	—	—
1985–86	Sokil Kyiv	USSR	40	16	9	25	6	—	—	—	—	—
1986–87	Sokil Kyiv	USSR	40	16	3	19	16	—	—	—	—	—
1987–88	Sokil Kyiv	USSR	43	17	9	26	6	—	—	—	—	—
1988–89	Sokil Kyiv	USSR	42	19	13	32	10	—	—	—	—	—
1989–90	Sokil Kyiv	USSR	46	28	7	35	12	—	—	—	—	—
1990–91	Sokil Kyiv	USSR	46	36	20	56	10	—	—	—	—	—
1991–92	EHC Biel-Bienne	NDA	22	18	16	34	16	—	—	—	—	—
1992–93	EHC Biel-Bienne	NDA	35	43	17	60	22	4	4	1	5	2
1993–94	EHC Biel-Bienne	NDA	32	19	7	26	2	—	—	—	—	—
1994–95	HC Ajoie	CHE II	25	16	14	30	6	—	—	—	—	—
1995–96	Sokil Kyiv	IHL	23	2	5	7	10	—	—	—	—	—
1995–96	Salavat Yualev Ufa	IHL	21	8	4	12	10	4	1	2	3	2
1996–97	SC Luzern	CHE II	10	4	5	9	0	—	—	—	—	—
1996–97	HC Bolzano	AL	17	9	6	15	6	—	—	—	—	—
1996–97	HC Amiens	FRA	11	8	4	12	4	10	6	4	10	2
1997–98	EK Zell am See	AUT II	19	30	30	60		—	—	—	—	—
1998–99	EK Zell am See	AUT II	36	46	34	80		—	—	—	—	—
1999–2000	Berkut Kyiv	EEHL	20	10	5	15	6	—	—	—	—	—
1999–2000	HK Kyiv	EEHL	8	0	4	4	2	—	—	—	—	—
2001–02	Sokil Kyiv	UKR	11	9	7	16	2	—	—	—	—	—
2003–04	CG Puigcerdà	ESP	11	18	7	25	4	6	8	4	12	6
2004–05	CG Puigcerdà	ESP	7	8	5	13	0	1	0	0	0	2
USSR totals			385	187	83	270	108	—	—	—	—	—
NDA totals			89	80	40	120	40	4	4	1	5	2

=== International ===
Year	Team	Event	GP	G	A	Pts	PIM
1981	Soviet Union	WJC	5	4	2	6	0
1993	Ukraine	WC C	7	15	7	22	2
1994	Ukraine	WC C	6	12	2	14	0
1995	Ukraine	WC C	4	4	1	5	0
Senior totals			17	31	10	41	2
