= List of ice hockey teams in Spain =

List of ice hockey clubs in Spain sorted by division:

== Superliga Española 2010/2011 season ==
- CG Puigcerdà (Puigcerdà)
- FC Barcelona (Barcelona)
- Txuri-Urdin (San Sebastián)
- SAD Majadahonda (Majadahonda)
- Aramón Jaca (Jaca)

=== Teams not competing ===
- CH Vielha (Vielha e Mijaran)
- CH Villalba (Vilalba)
- Anglet Hormadi (France) (Anglet)
