= 1990–91 Liga Nacional de Hockey Hielo season =

Spanish ice hockey season

The 1990–91 Superliga Espanola de Hockey Hielo season was the 17th season of the Superliga Espanola de Hockey Hielo, the top level of ice hockey in Spain. Five teams participated in the league, and CH Jaca won the championship.

== Standings ==
	Club	GP	W	T	L	Goals	Pts
1.	CH Jaca	12	11	0	1	96:45	22
2.	CH Txuri Urdin	12	9	1	2	90:47	19
3.	CG Puigcerdà	12	5	1	6	52:50	11
4.	FC Barcelona	12	4	0	8	77:79	8
5.	CH Gasteiz	12	0	0	12	33:127	0
