= 2021–22 Liga Nacional de Hockey Hielo season =

- League: Liga Nacional de Hockey Hielo
- Sport: Ice hockey
- Duration: September 18, 2021 – April 3, 2022
- Number of teams: 8

Regular season
- Regular-season winner: Puigcerdà

Playoffs

Finals
- Champions: FC Barcelona (7th title)
- Runners-up: Puigcerdà

Liga Nacional de Hockey Hielo seasons
- ← 2020–21 2022–23 →

The 2021–22 Liga Nacional de Hockey Hielo season was the 48th season of the Liga Nacional de Hockey Hielo, the top level of ice hockey in Spain. Eight teams participated in the league.

== Teams ==
Team	City/Area	Stadium	Capacity
FC Barcelona	Barcelona	Pista de Gel	1,256
CH Jaca	Jaca	Pabellón de Hielo	1,900
Majadahonda	Majadahonda	Palacio del Hielo	350
Puigcerdà	Puigcerdà	Pista de Gel	1,456
Txuri Urdin	San Sebastián	Palacio del Hielo	650
CH Huarte	Navarre	Palacio de Hielo Huarte	500
Nordic Vikings Madrid	Majadahonda	Palacio del Hielo	350
Milenio Logroño	Logroño	Pista de Hielo Lobete	640

== Regular season ==
Pos	Team	Pld	W	OTW	OTL	L	GF	GA	GD	Pts	Final Result
1	Puigcerdà	21	16	2	0	3	144	72	+72	52	Teams advanced to Championship Finals
2	CH Jaca	21	15	0	2	4	111	51	+60	47	Teams advanced to Championship Finals
3	FC Barcelona	20	12	2	0	6	103	57	+46	40	Teams advanced to Championship Finals
4	SAD Majadahonda	21	11	0	0	10	83	66	+17	33	Teams advanced to Championship Finals
5	Nordic Vikings	21	8	1	4	8	87	74	+13	30	
6	Txuri Urdin	21	9	1	0	11	95	91	+4	29	
7	CH Huarte	21	5	0	0	16	49	130	−81	15	
8	Milenio Logroño	20	1	0	0	19	61	192	−131	3	

Source: Official site

== Statistics ==
=== Scoring leaders ===
The following players led the league in points, at the conclusion of matches played on 20 February 2022.

Player	Team	GP	G	A	Pts	+/–	PIM
(Russia) Ignat Zemchenko	Puigcerdà	19	28	32	60	+31	12
(Spain) Nacho Granell	Puigcerdà	19	28	20	48	+30	10
(Canada) Sean McGovern	Puigcerdà	19	25	21	46	+26	18
(Spain) Oriol Rubio	FC Barcelona	15	23	19	42	+17	6
(Spain) Mikel Mendizabal	Txuri Urdin	18	15	19	34	+9	18
(Spain) Patricio Fuentes	Txuri Urdin	17	14	20	34	+7	8
(Spain) Alejandro Carbonell	CH Jaca	18	11	23	34	+23	4
(Spain) Pablo Pantoja	CH Jaca	16	18	15	33	+23	10
(Spain) Pol Costa	Puigcerdà	18	14	18	32	+33	8
(Sweden) Nils Lindström	Nordic Vikings	20	20	11	31	+15	4

== Results ==
Home	Away							
Home	Barcelona	Jaca	Huarte	Majadahonda	Milenio	Nordic	Puigcerdà	Txuri Urdin
FC Barcelona	–	3–2	6–2; 9–0	10–1	7–4; 11–3	3–2 GWS	2–5; 4–1	8–0; 3–2
CH Jaca	7–3; 2–1	–	5–2; 12–0	2–1	8–2	4–2	5–6 GWS; 2–5	7–3
CH Huarte	0–9	2–5	–	6–2	3–1; 4–3	1–5; 2–1	4–8; 4–8	2–9
SAD Majadahonda	3–7; 4–1	2–4; 1–5	5–0; 4–0	–	8–0	3–5	3–4	6–1
Milenio Logroño	Cancelled	0–10; 1–16	4–7	1–5; 0–11	–	2–8; 6–7	8–18	6–11; 8–7
Nordic Vikings	2–3 OT; 4–7	4–3 OT; 4–6	10–4	1–5; 2–0	11–1	–	4–5 GWS	3–4; 6–1
Puigcerdà	8–3	5–2	10–2	8–3; 2–4	10–2; 16–6	6–3; 5–1	–	8–2
Txuri Urdin	5–3	3–0; 1–4	9–1; 5–3	4–5; 3–7	14–3	3–2 OT	3–5; 5–1	–
OT - Overtime. GWS - Shootout.

== Playoffs ==
Semi-finals
1	Puigcerdà	2
4	SAD Majadahonda	0
2	CH Jaca	1
3	FC Barcelona	2

Finals
1	Puigcerdà	1
3	FC Barcelona	3

=== Semi-finals ===
Puigcerdà – SAD Majadahonda 2-0
12.03.2022	SAD Majadahonda	Puigcerdà	3-6
19.03.2022	Puigcerdà	SAD Majadahonda	6-2
Puigcerdà won the series 2–0.

CH Jaca – FC Barcelona 1-2
12.03.2022	FC Barcelona	CH Jaca	4-2
19.03.2022	CH Jaca	FC Barcelona	3-2
20.03.2022	CH Jaca	FC Barcelona	1-2 GWS
FC Barcelona won the series 2–1.

=== Finals ===
Puigcerdà – FC Barcelona 1–3
26.03.2022	Puigcerdà	FC Barcelona	6-3
27.03.2022	Puigcerdà	FC Barcelona	1-3
02.04.2022	FC Barcelona	Puigcerdà	7-4
03.04.2022	FC Barcelona	Puigcerdà	5-4 OT
FC Barcelona won the series 3–1.

== Final rankings ==
Gold medal	FC Barcelona
Silver medal	Puigcerdà
Bronze medal	CH Jaca
4	SAD Majadahonda
5	Nordic Vikings
6	Txuri Urdin
7	CH Huarte
8	Milenio Logroño
