= 1975–76 Liga Nacional de Hockey Hielo season =

Spanish ice hockey season

The 1975–76 Superliga Espanola de Hockey Hielo season was the fourth season of the Superliga Espanola de Hockey Hielo, the top level of ice hockey in Spain. 11 teams participated in the league, and CH Txuri Urdin won the championship.

== Standings ==
	Club	GP	Goals	Pts
1.	CH Txuri Urdin	20	221:18	37
2.	FC Barcelona	20	270:43	36
3.	CH Casco Viejo Bilbao	20	215:88	32
4.	CH Jaca	20	264:67	26
5.	Real Sociedad	20	125:90	25
6.	CH Barcelona-Catalonia	20	144:97	24
7.	CH Portugalete	20	67:116	13
8.	CH Pirineos	20	75:137	11
9.	CG Puigcerdà	20	75:206	7
10.	Nogaro Bilbao	20	26:305	6
11.	CH Vitoria	20	26:342	2
