= 1985–86 Liga Nacional de Hockey Hielo season =

Spanish ice hockey season

The 1985–86 Superliga Espanola de Hockey Hielo season was the 14th season of the Superliga Espanola de Hockey Hielo, the top level of ice hockey in Spain. Four teams participated in the league, and CG Puigcerda won the championship.

== First round ==
	Club	GP	W	T	L	Goals	Pts
1.	CG Puigcerdà	12	11	0	1	93:33	22
2.	CH Jaca	12	9	0	3	86:42	18
3.	CH Txuri Urdin	12	4	0	8	41:67	8
4.	CH Gel Barcelona	12	0	0	12	31:108	0

== Final round ==
	Club	GP	W	T	L	Goals	Pts
1.	CG Puigcerdà	16	15	0	1	119:43	30
2.	CH Jaca	16	11	0	5	115:57	22
3.	CH Txuri Urdin	16	4	0	12	53:109	8

== Final ==
- CG Puigcerdà – CH Jaca 5:3
