= 1978–79 Liga Nacional de Hockey Hielo season =

Spanish ice hockey season

The 1978–79 Superliga Espanola de Hockey Hielo season was the seventh season of the Superliga Espanola de Hockey Hielo, the top level of ice hockey in Spain. Five teams participated in the league, and CH Casco Viejo Bilbao won the championship.

== Standings ==
	Club	GP	Pts
1.	CH Casco Viejo Bilbao	16	28
2.	CH Txuri Urdin	16	27
3.	FC Barcelona	16	17
4.	CH Jaca	16	8
5.	Zubialde Bilbao	16	0
