= Sami Wikström =

Finnish ice hockey left winger

- Born: August 8, 1967 (age 58) Helsinki, Finland
- Height: 6 ft 2 in (188 cm)
- Weight: 190 lb (86 kg; 13 st 8 lb)
- Position: Left wing
- Shot: Left
- Played for: Reipas; Herning Blue Fox; Heerenveen Flyers; Drakkars de Caen; Brest Albatros Hockey; HC Alleghe
- Playing career: 1988–2008

Sami Wikström (born August 8, 1967) is a Finnish former ice hockey left winger.

Wikström played the majority of his career with Reipas, playing in the SM-liiga for Hockey Reipas between 1990 and 1992 and its successor Reipas Lahti between 1992 and 1994.

== Career statistics ==
			Regular season					Playoffs
Season	Team	League	GP	G	A	Pts	PIM	GP	G	A	Pts	PIM
1984–85	HIFK U20	Jr. A SM-sarja	25	13	6	19	10	—	—	—	—	—
1985–86	HIFK U20	Jr. A SM-sarja	28	28	11	29	28	5	2	1	3	4
1986–87	Karhu-Kissat U20	Jr. A SM-sarja	1	0	0	0	2	—	—	—	—	—
1986–87	Karhu-Kissat	I-Divisioona	40	16	12	28	14	—	—	—	—	—
1987–88	Kiekkoreipas U20	U20 I-Divisioona	4	3	4	7	0	—	—	—	—	—
1987–88	Kiekkoreipas	I-Divisioona	44	11	17	28	35	—	—	—	—	—
1988–89	Kiekkoreipas	I-Divisioona	44	20	17	37	16	—	—	—	—	—
1989–90	Hockey Reipas	I-Divisioona	44	19	21	40	36	—	—	—	—	—
1990–91	Hockey Reipas	SM-liiga	44	3	6	9	22	—	—	—	—	—
1991–92	Hockey Reipas	SM-liiga	44	18	12	30	26	—	—	—	—	—
1992–93	Reipas Lahti	SM-liiga	46	8	16	24	30	—	—	—	—	—
1993–94	Reipas Lahti	SM-liiga	48	10	5	15	18	—	—	—	—	—
1994–95	Reipas Lahti	I-Divisioona	43	19	24	43	18	—	—	—	—	—
1995–96	Reipas Lahti	I-Divisioona	44	19	37	56	36	3	2	2	4	0
1996–97	Herning IK	Denmark	42	14	32	46	36	—	—	—	—	—
1997–98	Heerenveen Flyers	Netherlands	24	25	22	47	24	5	1	3	4	8
1999–00	Herning Blue Fox	Denmark	48	19	31	50	8	—	—	—	—	—
2000–01	Drakkars de Caen	France	28	16	9	25	6	—	—	—	—	—
2001–02	Albatros de Brest	France3	—	—	—	—	—	—	—	—	—	—
2002–03	Albatros de Brest	France	19	5	3	8	8	—	—	—	—	—
2003–04	CG Puigcerdà	Spain	15	13	4	17	22	6	1	2	3	16
2004–05	HC Alleghe	Italy	2	1	0	1	0	—	—	—	—	—
2004–05	HC Falcons Brixen-Bressanone	Italy2	18	7	13	20	8	—	—	—	—	—
2005–06	Albatros de Brest	France4	—	—	—	—	—	—	—	—	—	—
2006–07	Albatros de Brest	France3	28	16	22	38	34	4	1	5	6	4
2007–08	Albatros de Brest	France3	18	11	22	33	14	4	2	5	7	4
2010–11	Albatros de Brest II	France4	11	33	23	56	6	2	1	3	4	4
2011–12	Albatros de Brest II	France4	10	13	12	25	8	2	0	1	1	0
2017–18	Albatros de Brest II	France4	1	0	0	0	0	—	—	—	—	—
SM-liiga totals			182	39	39	78	96	—	—	—	—	—
I-Divisioona totals			259	104	128	232	155	3	2	2	4	0
