= Joan Laporta =

Spanish businessman (born 1962)

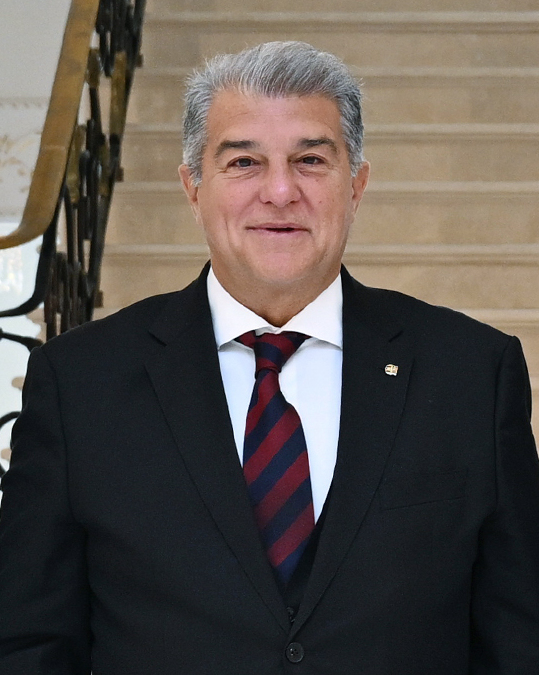
- Laporta in 2025

38th and 41st President of FC Barcelona
- Incumbent
- Assumed office 7 March 2021 (Note: Rafa Yuste served as interim president while Laporta's presidential powers and duties were suspended from 9 February 2026 to 1 July 2026 during Laporta's re-election campaign and subsequent transition period.)
- Preceded by: Josep Maria Bartomeu; Carles Tusquets (interim)
- In office 15 June 2003 – 30 June 2010
- Preceded by: Joan Gaspart; Enric Reyna (interim)
- Succeeded by: Sandro Rosell

Member of the Catalan Parliament
- In office 29 November 2010 – 17 December 2012
- Constituency: Barcelona

Member of the Barcelona City Council
- In office 30 January 2006 – 1 July 2011

Personal details
- Born: Joan Laporta i Estruch; 29 June 1962 (age 64) Barcelona, Spain
- Party: Partit per la Independència (1996–1999); Democràcia Catalana (2010–2015)
- Spouse: Constanza Echevarría
- Children: 3
- Education: University of Barcelona
- Profession: Lawyer

Joan Laporta i Estruch (Catalan pronunciation: [ʒuˈan ləˈpɔɾtə əsˈtɾuk]; born 29 June 1962) is a Spanish businessman and politician. He is currently serving as president of FC Barcelona since 2021, having previously served from 2003 to 2010.

Laporta studied law at the University of Barcelona and later founded his own law firm, Laporta & Arbós, which has a number of notable Catalan firms as clients. He served as an MP in the Parliament of Catalonia between 2010 and 2012.

During his first tenure as president of Barcelona, they set a new record for trophies won in a 12-month period, winning six in 2009. After departing in 2010, he was re-elected as club president in 2021.

During Laporta's reign as club president, the sports sections of Barcelona have won over 101 official trophies as of 2025.

== Career at Barcelona ==
Laporta started his involvement with FC Barcelona leading the "Elefant Blau" ("Blue Elephant") coalition that opposed former president Josep Lluís Núñez and which, in 1998, tried unsuccessfully a vote of no confidence against him.

=== 2003–2010: First tenure as club president ===
==== First season in charge ====
In the 2003 elections, Laporta did not start as the favourite, but his charisma grew during the electoral campaign and he finally won against the expected victor, publicist Lluís Bassat, in part because of a widely published (and ultimately unfulfilled) promise to bring David Beckham to Barcelona. Laporta had the support of other young businessmen of Barcelona, such as Sandro Rosell. Laporta quickly became a media star, even more than some of the players.

Laporta's first season (2003–04) as president would prove to be a watershed for the club, but not without initial instability. The club situation was one of bitter unhappiness and disappointment amongst both fans and players after the club failed to meet their own standards to match Real Madrid's success in the early 2000s, having not won trophies since 1999.

==== Arrival of Frank Rijkaard ====
With Laporta's arrival, and that of football superstar Ronaldinho (his star signing after David Beckham's decision to go to Real Madrid, and Thierry Henry who decided to remain at Arsenal) as well as new manager Frank Rijkaard, among others, the club was forced to embark on a new phase, having elected a new, young and largely untested managerial board along with him. Laporta also decided to fight against the threat of violence outside the Camp Nou, specially from the Boixos Nois (Mad Boys) ultras gang, and faced insults and death threats from them. A police investigation revealed they had planned to kidnap him. To exacerbate the situation, the 2003–04 season began abysmally results-wise, with Laporta constantly having to call for the fans' understanding and patience with him and Rijkaard as the club slowly phased out underachieving players from the old guard in order to rebuild a new-look side around Ronaldinho.

Laporta also had to spur his board to foster creative business ideas to raise revenue, and in recent years, that new style of management eventually succeeded in turning around the fortunes of the club with the team spectacularly returning to form and finishing second after being at the bottom of the table in 2003–04, and then finally managing to win La Liga titles both in 2004–05 and in 2005–06. During this period, the inherited massive financial debt started to be cut down, and only two players remained from the original team that did not win a major title in six years, with players like Deco, Samuel Eto'o and Edmílson as the new starlets, around Ronaldinho and a core of home-grown players like Carles Puyol, Xavi, Andrés Iniesta, Víctor Valdés and Oleguer. The club finally won the UEFA Champions League on 17 May 2006, only their second time in history, as well as that year's Liga championship.

Barcelona had a long history of avoiding shirt sponsors. In 2006, Barcelona announced a five-year agreement with UNICEF, where the club would donate €1.5 million and the UNICEF logo would feature on their shirts. After Laporta left as president, the club signed shirt sponsorships with Qatar Foundation and later Qatar Airways, which he criticised.

==== Re-election as club president ====
There was some discussion about when exactly Laporta's mandate started, with the board of directors holding one opinion and the opposition another. One club member went to the court and, on 19 July 2006, a judge ruled that the first eight days of his presidency in June 2003 counted as the first year of his four-year term; his term had therefore expired and new elections were called. Temporarily, the club was ruled by a management committee led by the economist Xavier Sala-i-Martin.

The elections were to be held on 3 September 2006, but they turned out to be unnecessary as on 22 August, Barcelona confirmed Laporta's presidency for another four years after no other would-be candidate received the 1,804 signatures required to stand for the elections.

==== Vote of No Confidence ====
The poor results of the sports sections, especially in football, together with concerns about his leadership style, resulted in a censure motion which took place on 6 July 2008 and was led by Oriol Giralt. Exit polls showed that 60.60% of the 39,389 votes cast were against Laporta. Even though he lost the overall vote, however, the necessary 66% to hold new elections was not reached.

Following the results, it was speculated that Laporta would resign due to pressure from fellow directors. This would have resulted in then vice-president Albert Vicens taking over for Laporta, with Ferran Soriano replacing Vicens as the main vice-president. These rumours, however, were quickly dismissed by Laporta. On 10 July 2008, 8 of the 17 board members – vice-presidents Albert Vicens, Ferran Soriano and Marc Ingla, and directors Evarist Murtra, Toni Rovira, Xavier Cambra, Clàudia Vives-Fierro and Josep Lluís Vilaseca – resigned following Laporta's confirmation that he will stay on as president of the club despite the opinion of the members. In a press statement, they revealed that they resigned due to "discrepancies in the way to act after the result of the motion".

==== The return of Pep Guardiola ====
After dismissing Barcelona head coach Frank Rijkaard, Laporta appointed the untested and inexperienced Pep Guardiola, Barça's team captain at the end of the "Dream Team" era. Guardiola's only experience as a coach was with the B team the previous season, which won promotion from the fourth tier to the third. Although the team started poorly, losing the first match to Numancia and drawing the second, Barcelona had the best season in its history, winning the treble of La Liga, the Copa del Rey and the UEFA Champions League, Supercopa de España and UEFA Super Cup titles followed in August, as well as a FIFA Club World Cup victory in December. He was succeeded by Sandro Rosell in 2010.

=== 2021–2026: Second tenure as club president ===
In November 2020, Laporta announced president candidacy for the 2021 FC Barcelona presidential elections. In January 2021, he officially entered the presidential race after presenting 10,252 signatures out of which 9,625 were validated and was the favorite to win the presidential election. On 7 March, Laporta won the presidential election, in which he received 54.28% of the vote ahead of Víctor Font and Toni Freixa who received 29.99% and 8.58% of the vote respectively. He succeeded Josep Maria Bartomeu, who resigned in October 2020 to avoid facing a vote of no confidence from the club members.

Following his election, Laporta immediately set about restructuring the club's executive and sporting departments, appointing Ferran Reverter as CEO and Mateu Alemany as director of football, while initiating changes across the legal, professional, and youth sections. His tenure oversaw major squad overhauls, including the departures of Lionel Messi and other senior players due to financial constraints, as well as key signings such as Sergio Agüero, Memphis Depay, and later Robert Lewandowski, Jules Koundé, and Raphinha.

Under his leadership, Xavi Hernández was appointed first-team coach in November 2021, restoring stability and guiding the team to improved performances, including winning the 2022–23 La Liga title. He later appointed Hansi Flick as head coach, who led the club to a domestic double in the 2024–25 season. Off the pitch, he secured major sponsorships, including Spotify and Nike, oversaw funding for the new Camp Nou and Espai Barça projects.

On 9 February 2026, Laporta resigned as Barcelona president, in accordance with Article 42.f of the club's statutes, to stand for re-election. He stated the move was strategic and not related to any immediate crisis. Laporta entered the campaign alongside candidates Víctor Font, Xavi Vilajoana, and Marc Ciria. Eight members of his executive team also resigned, and Rafa Yuste was appointed interim president to ensure institutional continuity until 30 June 2026.

=== 2026–present: Re-election and third tenure ===
On 15 March 2026, Laporta was re-elected as Barcelona president, taking 68% of the vote, beating candidate Víctor Font in the process.

== Political activities ==
Laporta has long been involved in politics. In 1996, he joined the Independence Party, formed by Pilar Rahola and Àngel Colom, former members of the Republican Left of Catalonia.

Laporta has long held ambitions to enter Catalan politics after leaving office as president of FC Barcelona. He has in the past been outspoken about his political affiliations: he supports Catalan independence from Spain. FC Barcelona is seen by many as a symbol of Catalonia, a generally accepted fact which Laporta often emphasizes but has been criticized by those who think that Barça should remain neutral from a political standpoint.

Following the end of his second term as president, Laporta formed the independence-seeking political party Democràcia Catalana (Catalan Democracy). In the summer of 2010, Laporta's party merged with other extra-parliamentary pro-independence parties and grassroots movements into a political platform called Catalan Solidarity for Independence. Laporta was elected its president.

In the Catalan elections of 28 November 2010, the new party managed to win four seats in the 135-member Catalan Parliament, making it the sixth largest party out of seven. Laporta was elected in the Barcelona Province constituency.

In 2011, Laporta stepped down as president of the Catalan Solidarity for Independence and left the party.

== Criticism ==
Laporta's management of the sports sections of the club, especially the basketball section, has been controversial. On 2 June 2005, he faced the resignation of five members of the club's board of directors, including Sandro Rosell. They accused him of having changed for the worse as a person, having adopted authoritarian traits and harbouring ambitions of power.

In October 2005, he faced a scandal when his brother-in-law and member of the board of directors in charge of security, Alejandro Echevarría, was revealed to be a member of the Francisco Franco Foundation. After several denials by Echevarría and Laporta, contested by documents shown by a former member of the board of directors, Laporta was finally forced to accept Echevarría's resignation. Echevarría continued, however, to be close to the club and he organized the security during the celebrations of the 2005–06 La Liga championship.

Laporta's own political history added to the complications surrounding the Echevarría scandal, as his politics are diametrically opposed to those implied by Echevarría's membership of the Francisco Franco Foundation. Laporta is a self-described Catalan nationalist and has been identified on several occasions as supporting the independence of Catalonia from Spain. In the early 1990s, he and fellow Catalan politicians Pilar Rahola and Ángel Colom founded the now-defunct Partit per la independencia, which supported Catalan separatism. He was also an active participant at the controversial Frankfurt Book Fair of 2007, at which Catalan language and culture were the special featured invitees, but not including other Catalonia-based authors who wrote in other languages, such as Spanish. At the fair, Laporta stated that he "hopes that FC Barcelona continues to be a tool to promote the Catalan language and culture" and to the contrary, he would feel obligated "to create the Catalan Republic of Barcelona".

Another criticism Joan Laporta faced was coming back to his presidential chair in 2021 for Barcelona, which already had big financial issues and its best football player Lionel Messi on the verge of leaving, with promises to turn the situation around and persuade Messi to stay. He failed the promise, Messi left for another club making some fans angry and upset. Messi's exit from Barcelona led to Jaume Llopis, a former member of the Espai Barça Commission, to resign from his post stating that the club and the president did not do their all to keep the Argentine at the club.

=== Court incident regarding the use of Catalan ===
On 2 March 2015, Joan Laporta refused to testify in Spanish before the Court of First Instance No. 25 of Barcelona, where he had been summoned as a witness in a dispute between the club and the company MCM concerning an advertising contract on the facade of La Masia. The judge asked him to speak in Spanish out of courtesy to the plaintiffs' lawyer, Mario Conde, who was from Galicia.

Laporta declined the request, stating: "After waiting here since nine o'clock in the morning, I believe I have every right to testify in Catalan, which is my own language and that of my country."

Following Laporta’s refusal, magistrate Antonio Morales offered him the possibility of returning to testify at another session with the presence of an interpreter. Laporta considered it disrespectful that the provision of an interpreter had not been arranged from the outset.

The incident sparked public debate about language rights and the use of Catalan in judicial settings.

== Personal life ==
Laporta is married to Constanza Echevarría and has three sons, Pol, Guillem and Jan. Laporta's son Pol is a footballer who plays as an attacking midfielder.

== Trophies won by club during presidency ==
=== Football ===
Barcelona:

- La Liga:
  - 2004–05, 2005–06, 2008–09, 2009–10, 2022–23, 2024–25, 2025–26
- Copa del Rey:
  - 2008–09, 2020–21, 2024–25
- Supercopa de España:
  - 2005, 2006, 2009, 2023, 2025, 2026
- UEFA Champions League:
  - 2005–06, 2008–09
- UEFA Super Cup:
  - 2009
- FIFA Club World Cup:
  - 2009

Barcelona Femení:

- Primera División (women) / Liga F:
  - 2020–21, 2021–22, 2022–23, 2023–24, 2024–25, 2025–26
- Copa de la Reina de Fútbol:
  - 2020–21, 2021–22, 2023–24, 2024–25, 2025-26
- Supercopa de España Femenina:
  - 2021–22, 2022–23, 2023–24, 2024–25, 2025–26
- UEFA Women's Champions League:
  - 2020–21, 2022–23, 2023–24, 2025–26

=== Futsal ===
Barcelona Futsal:

- Primera División:
  - 2020–21, 2021–22, 2022–23, 2025–26
- Copa del Rey de Futsal:
  - 2022–23
- Copa de España (LNFS):
  - 2022, 2024
- Supercopa de España:
  - 2022, 2023
- UEFA Futsal Champions League:
  - 2021–22

=== Basketball ===
Barcelona Basketball:

- Liga ACB:
  - 2003–04, 2008–09, 2020–21, 2022–23
- Copa del Rey de Baloncesto:
  - 2007, 2010, 2021, 2022
- Supercopa de España de Baloncesto:
  - 2004, 2009
- EuroLeague:
  - 2009–10

=== Handball ===
Barcelona Handbol:

- Liga ASOBAL:
  - 2005–06, 2020–21, 2021–22, 2022–23, 2023–24, 2024–25, 2025–26
- Copa del Rey de Balonmano:
  - 2003–04, 2006–07, 2008–09, 2009–10, 2020–21, 2021–22, 2022–23, 2023–24, 2024–25, 2025–26
- Copa ASOBAL:
  - 2009–10, 2020–21, 2021–22, 2022–23, 2023–24, 2024–25, 2025–26
- Supercopa ASOBAL:
  - 2003–04, 2006–07, 2008–09, 2009–10, 2020–21, 2021–22
- Supercopa Ibérica:
  - 2022, 2023, 2024, 2025
- EHF Champions League:
  - 2004–05, 2020–21, 2021–22, 2023–24, 2025–26
- European Super Cup:
  - 2003–04
- IHF Men's Club World Championship:
  - 2025

=== Roller hockey ===
Barcelona Roller Hockey:

- OK Liga:
  - 2003–04, 2004–05, 2005–06, 2006–07, 2007–08, 2008–09, 2009–10, 2020–21, 2022–23, 2023–24, 2024–25
- Copa del Rey de Hockey Patines:
  - 2005, 2007, 2022, 2023, 2024
- Supercopa de España de Hockey Patines:
  - 2004, 2005, 2007, 2008, 2022, 2023, 2024, 2025
- Champions League:
  - 2003–04, 2004–05, 2006–07, 2007–08, 2009–10
- WSE Cup:
  - 2005–06
- Continental Cup:
  - 2004, 2005, 2006, 2007, 2008
- CERH Ciudad de Vigo Tournament:
  - 2004, 2007
- Intercontinental Cup:
  - 2005, 2008, 2023

=== Ice hockey ===
Barcelona Ice Hockey:

- Liga Nacional de Hockey Hielo Spanish Champion:
  - 2008–09, 2020–21, 2021–22
