= Ice hockey in Spain =

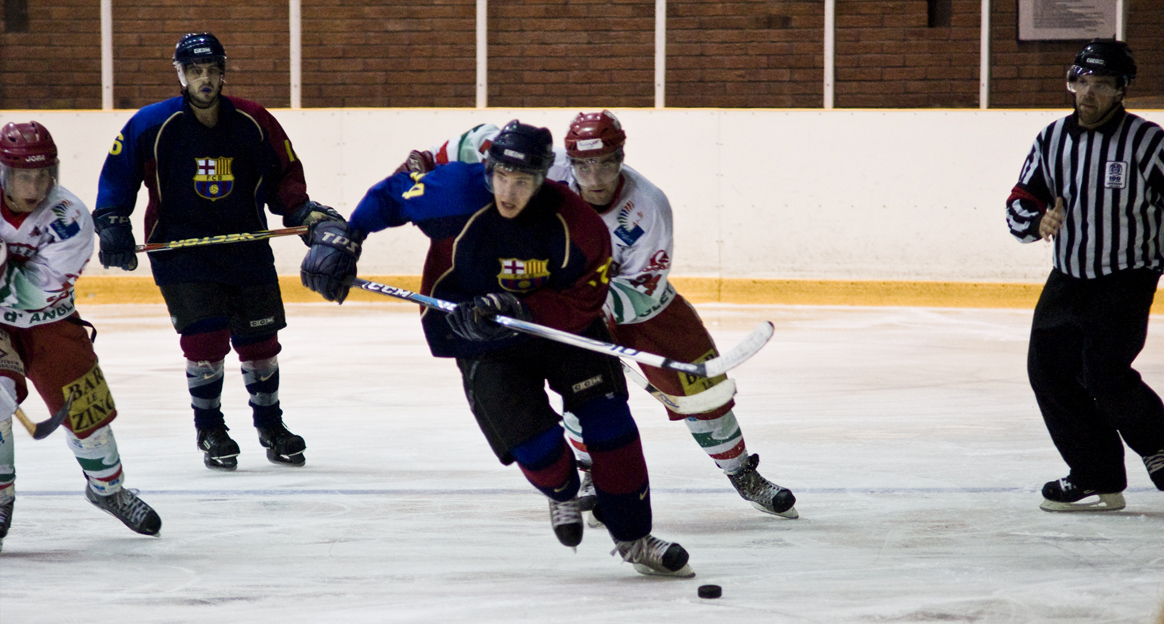
- Country: Spain
- Governing body: Spanish Ice Sports Federation
- National teams: Men's national team; Women's national team
- Clubs: Superliga

National competitions
- Copa del Rey

International competitions
- Ice Hockey World Championships; Winter Olympics; World Cup

Ice hockey in Spain is governed by the Spanish Ice Sports Federation. Competition is divided into division levels, with the highest competition being in the Superliga Española de Hockey Hielo.

The teams also compete in a domestic cup competition each year, called the Copa del Rey. The winners of the Division de Honor (Honor Division) play the winners of the Copa del Rey in the Liga Nacional de Hockey Hielo (Super Cup).

The Spain men's national ice hockey team represents the country in international competitions.

== Current divisions ==
- Superliga
- Liga Elite Masculina
- Liga Elite Feminina

For a list of teams, see List of ice hockey clubs in Spain

== See also ==
- List of ice hockey clubs in Spain
