= 1977–78 Liga Nacional de Hockey Hielo season =

Spanish ice hockey season

The 1977–78 Superliga Espanola de Hockey Hielo season was the sixth season of the Superliga Espanola de Hockey Hielo, the top level of ice hockey in Spain. Seven teams participated in the league, and CH Casco Viejo Bilbao won the championship.

== First round ==
	Club	GP	W	T	L	Goals	Pts
1.	FC Barcelona	12	11	0	1	162:36	22
2.	CH Casco Viejo Bilbao	12	10	0	2	174:29	20
3.	CH Txuri Urdin	12	9	0	3	141:42	18
4.	CH Jaca	12	5	1	6	90:90	11
5.	CH Portugalete	12	4	1	7	96:70	9
6.	CH Las Palmas	12	2	0	10	24:161	4
7.	CH Vitoria	12	0	0	12	17:280	0

== Final round ==
	Club	GP	W	T	L	Goals	Pts
1.	CH Casco Viejo Bilbao	20	17	0	3	234:64	34
2.	FC Barcelona	20	14	1	5	208:77	29
3.	CH Txuri Urdin	20	10	1	9	175:78	21
