= Kent Nilsson =

Swedish ice hockey player (born 1956)

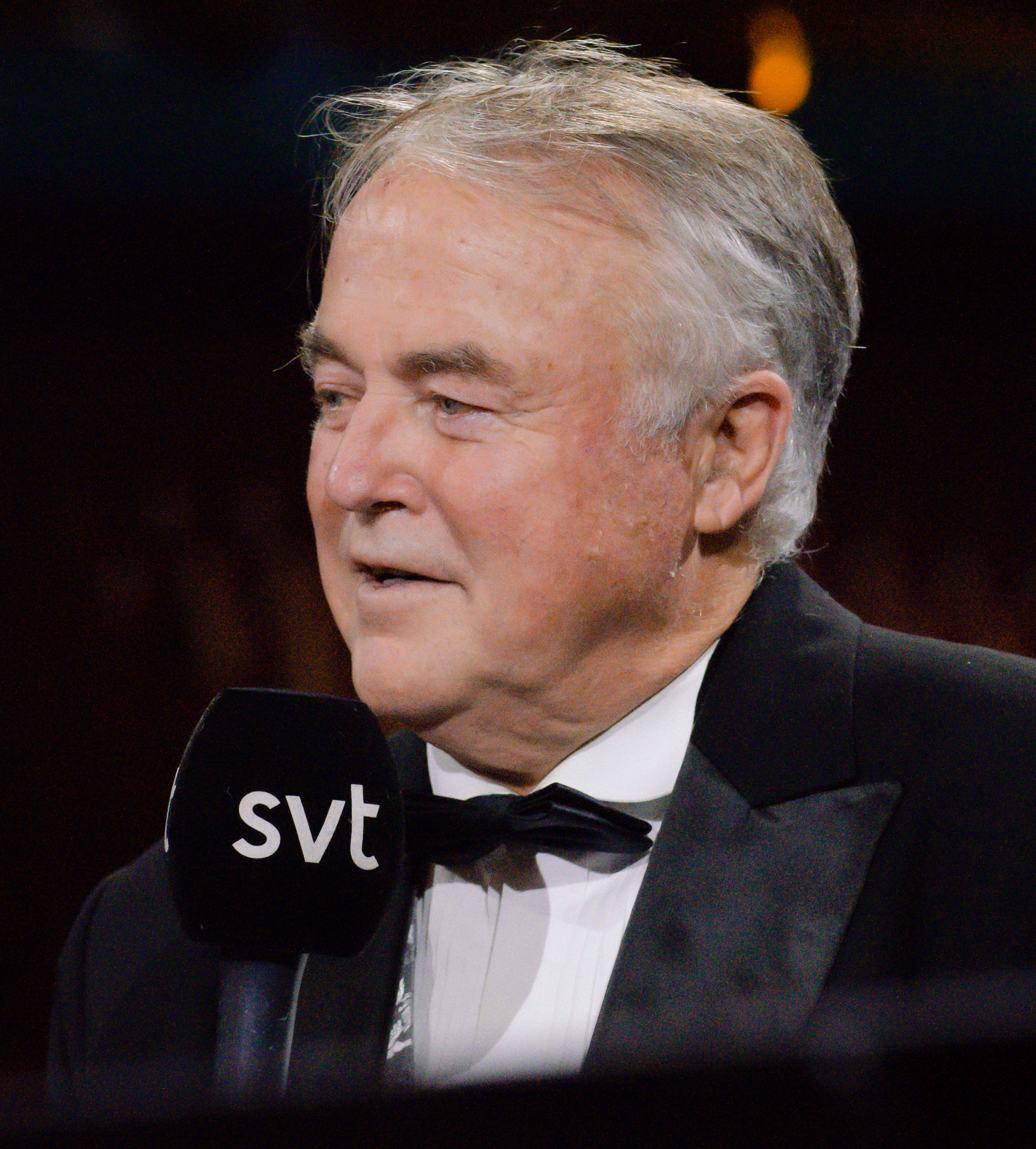
- Nilsson in 2022
- Born: 31 August 1956 (age 70) Nynäshamn, Sweden
- Height: 6 ft 0 in (183 cm)
- Weight: 195 lb (88 kg; 13 st 13 lb)
- Position: Centre
- Shot: Left
- Played for: Djurgårdens IF; AIK; Winnipeg Jets; Atlanta Flames; Calgary Flames; Minnesota North Stars; Edmonton Oilers; HC Bolzano; SC Langnau; EHC Kloten
- National team: Sweden
- NHL draft: 64th overall, 1976; Atlanta Flames
- WHA draft: 11th overall, 1976; Toronto Toros
- Playing career: 1976–1998

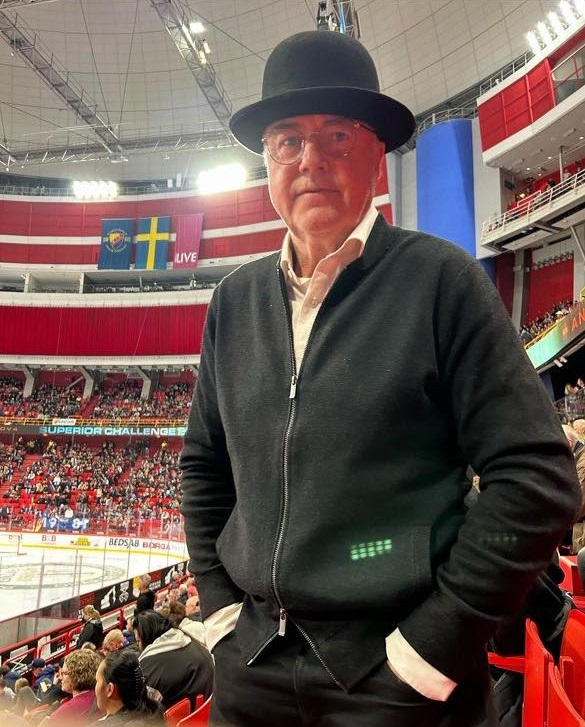
Nilsson at Stockholm Globe Arena in 2023

Kent Åke Nilsson (born 31 August 1956) is a Swedish former professional ice hockey centre. He played in the World Hockey Association (WHA) for the Winnipeg Jets, and in the National Hockey League (NHL) for the Atlanta and Calgary Flames, Minnesota North Stars and Edmonton Oilers, as well as teams across various European leagues.

A prolific scorer during his era, Nillson was called "Mr. Magic" and "The Magic Man" during his NHL career, referring to his exceptional puck skills. Wayne Gretzky commented on Nilsson's skills saying "Skills-wise he might have been the most skilled hockey player I ever saw in my entire career". Nilsson has the 10th highest career NHL points-per-game average of any player who scored at least 500 points, the most among any player not inducted into the Hockey Hall of Fame.

Nilsson was inducted into the IIHF Hall of Fame in 2006, the World Hockey Association Hall of Fame in 2010, and the Swedish Hockey Hall of Fame in 2012.

== Playing career ==
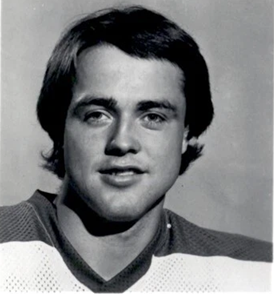
Nilsson in 1978 headshot for Winnipeg Jets

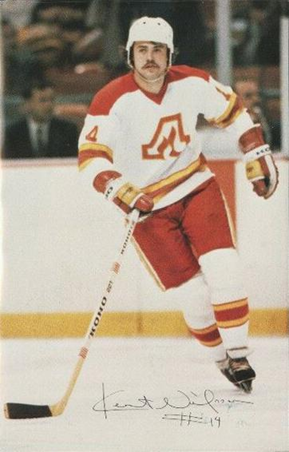
Nilsson with the Atlanta Flames in 1979

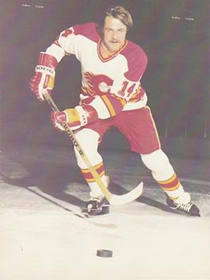
1980 photo of Nilsson with the newly relocated Flames

Nilsson began his career during the season of 1973–74, playing for Djurgårdens IF during his first of four seasons in Sweden. He then came to North America, and played for the Winnipeg Jets of the World Hockey Association (WHA) beginning in 1977. He scored two consecutive 100-point seasons in the WHA. He was claimed by the Atlanta Flames, and in his first season with the team he scored 93 points. The next season, 1980–81, the Flames moved to Calgary; Nilsson scored 131 points.

Nilsson played with the Flames, wearing number 14, until the 1984–85 season, when the team, perceiving him as inconsistent, traded him to the Minnesota North Stars for a draft pick that the Flames used to draft Joe Nieuwendyk. Nilsson won his first and only Stanley Cup while playing with the Edmonton Oilers in 1987. He announced in June 1987 that he would return to Europe. Ultimately, he would play in Italy, Switzerland, Sweden, Austria, and Norway. In 1988–89, he was named player-of-the-year in Sweden. He returned to the NHL in an attempted comeback in the 1994–95 season with Edmonton at the age of 38, which lasted six games. He was the last former Atlanta Flames player to play in the NHL. He then played the remainder of his playing career in Switzerland, Sweden, Norway, Austria, Germany until 1998 when he last played in the Spanish hockey league for SAD Majadahonda in six games, making Nilsson one of the few former Stanley Cup winners to play in the league.

Nilsson holds the NHL record for the quickest goal scored during a season-opening game, at ten seconds in, while playing for the North Stars versus the Quebec Nordiques on 11 October 1986.

== Awards ==
Medal record

Representing Sweden

Men's ice hockey

European Junior Championships
Gold medal – first place	1974 Switzerland	
Bronze medal – third place	1975 France	

World Junior Championships
Bronze medal – third place	1975 Canada & USA	
Bronze medal – third place	1980 Finland	

Canada Cup
Silver medal – second place	1984 Canada	

World Championships
Silver medal – second place	1990 Switzerland	

=== World Hockey Association ===
- Won Lou Kaplan Trophy (WHA Rookie of the Year) (1978)
- Won Paul Daneau Trophy (WHA Most Gentlemanly Player) (1979)
- Avco World Trophy champion (1978, 1979)
- Inaugural member of the World Hockey Association Hall of Fame (2010)

=== National Hockey League ===
- NHL All-Star Game — 1980, 1981
- Stanley Cup champion (1987)

=== Sweden and International ice hockey ===
- Member of the Swedish World All-Star Team (1985, 1989, 1990)
- Named Swedish Player of the Year (1989)
- Inducted into the IIHF Hall of Fame (2006)
- Inducted into the Swedish Hockey Hall of Fame (2012)

== Records ==
- Most points scored by a Swedish player in a single NHL season (131 in 1980–81)
- Calgary Flames team record for points in a single season (131 in 1980–81)
- Calgary Flames team record for assists in a single season (82 in 1980–81)
- Calgary Flames team record for shorthanded goals in a single season (9 in 1983–84)
- Calgary Flames team record for career hat-tricks (14)

== Post-playing career ==
In 2006, he was featured on HCZ, a Swedish reality show as coach for a hockey team of non-athletes. After retiring, he worked as a European scout for the Edmonton Oilers, departing in 2010. He later served as a scout for the Florida Panthers.

== Personal life ==
Nilsson was married from 2005 to 2016 to Swedish golfer Helen Alfredsson. He occasionally caddied for her in professional events. He is also the father of Robert Nilsson, a former Edmonton Oilers player, from an earlier marriage.

== Career statistics ==
=== Regular season and playoffs ===
			Regular season					Playoffs
Season	Team	League	GP	G	A	Pts	PIM	GP	G	A	Pts	PIM
1973–74	Djurgårdens IF	SWE	8	1	2	3	4	14	8	6	14	2
1974–75	Djurgårdens IF	SWE	28	13	12	25	14	—	—	—	—	—
1975–76	Djurgårdens IF	SEL	36	28	26	54	10	—	—	—	—	—
1976–77	AIK	SEL	36	30	19	49	18	—	—	—	—	—
1977–78	Winnipeg Jets	WHA	80	42	65	107	8	9	2	8	10	10
1978–79	Winnipeg Jets	WHA	78	39	68	107	8	10	3	11	14	4
1979–80	Atlanta Flames	NHL	80	40	53	93	10	4	0	0	0	2
1980–81	Calgary Flames	NHL	80	49	82	131	26	14	3	9	12	2
1981–82	Calgary Flames	NHL	41	26	29	55	8	3	0	3	3	2
1982–83	Calgary Flames	NHL	80	46	58	104	10	9	1	11	12	2
1983–84	Calgary Flames	NHL	67	31	49	80	22	—	—	—	—	—
1984–85	Calgary Flames	NHL	77	37	62	99	14	3	0	1	1	0
1985–86	Minnesota North Stars	NHL	61	16	44	60	10	5	1	4	5	0
1986–87	Minnesota North Stars	NHL	44	13	33	46	12	—	—	—	—	—
1986–87	Edmonton Oilers	NHL	17	5	12	17	4	21	6	13	19	6
1987–88	HC Bolzano	ITA	35	60	72	132	48	8	14	14	28	—
1987–88	SC Langnau	NDA	2	2	0	2	—	—	—	—	—	—
1988–89	Djurgårdens IF	SEL	35	21	21	42	36	1	0	1	1	0
1989–90	EHC Kloten	NDA	36	21	19	40	—	5	4	5	9	—
1990–91	EHC Kloten	NDA	33	37	39	76	—	8	3	8	11	—
1991–92	EHC Kloten	NDA	17	11	14	25	8	2	0	0	0	2
1992–93	Djurgårdens IF	SEL	40	11	20	31	20	6	2	3	5	0
1993–94	EC Graz	Alpenliga	30	15	33	48	—	—	—	—	—	—
1993–94	EC Graz	AUT	27	8	9	17	—	—	—	—	—	—
1994–95	Vålerengens IF	NOR	6	1	1	2	8	—	—	—	—	—
1994–95	Edmonton Oilers	NHL	6	1	0	1	0	—	—	—	—	—
1995–96	Nynäshamns IF	SWE III	2	2	3	5	6	—	—	—	—	—
1997–98	CH Majadahonda	ESP	6	8	12	20	—	2	3	8	11	—
SEL totals			147	90	86	176	84	7	2	4	6	0
WHA totals			158	81	133	214	16	19	5	19	24	14
NHL totals			553	264	422	686	116	59	11	41	52	14
NDA totals			86	71	75	146	56	14	9	13	22	22

=== International ===
Year	Team	Comp	GP	G	A	Pts	PIM
1974	Sweden	EJC	5	8	7	15	2
1975	Sweden	WJC	6	3	3	6	—
1975	Sweden	EJC	5	5	5	10	0
1976	Sweden	WJC	4	1	3	4	2
1981	Sweden	CC	5	0	2	2	4
1984	Sweden	CC	8	3	8	11	4
1985	Sweden	WC	8	6	5	11	6
1987	Sweden	CC	6	0	4	4	4
1989	Sweden	WC	10	3	11	14	0
1990	Sweden	WC	10	10	2	12	6
Junior totals			20	17	18	35	—
Senior totals			47	22	32	52	24

Preceded by Bo Berglund	Guldpucken; 1989	Succeeded by Rolf Ridderwall
