= 2021 FC Barcelona presidential election =

- 7 March 2021
- Turnout: 50.42% (▲7.3pp)
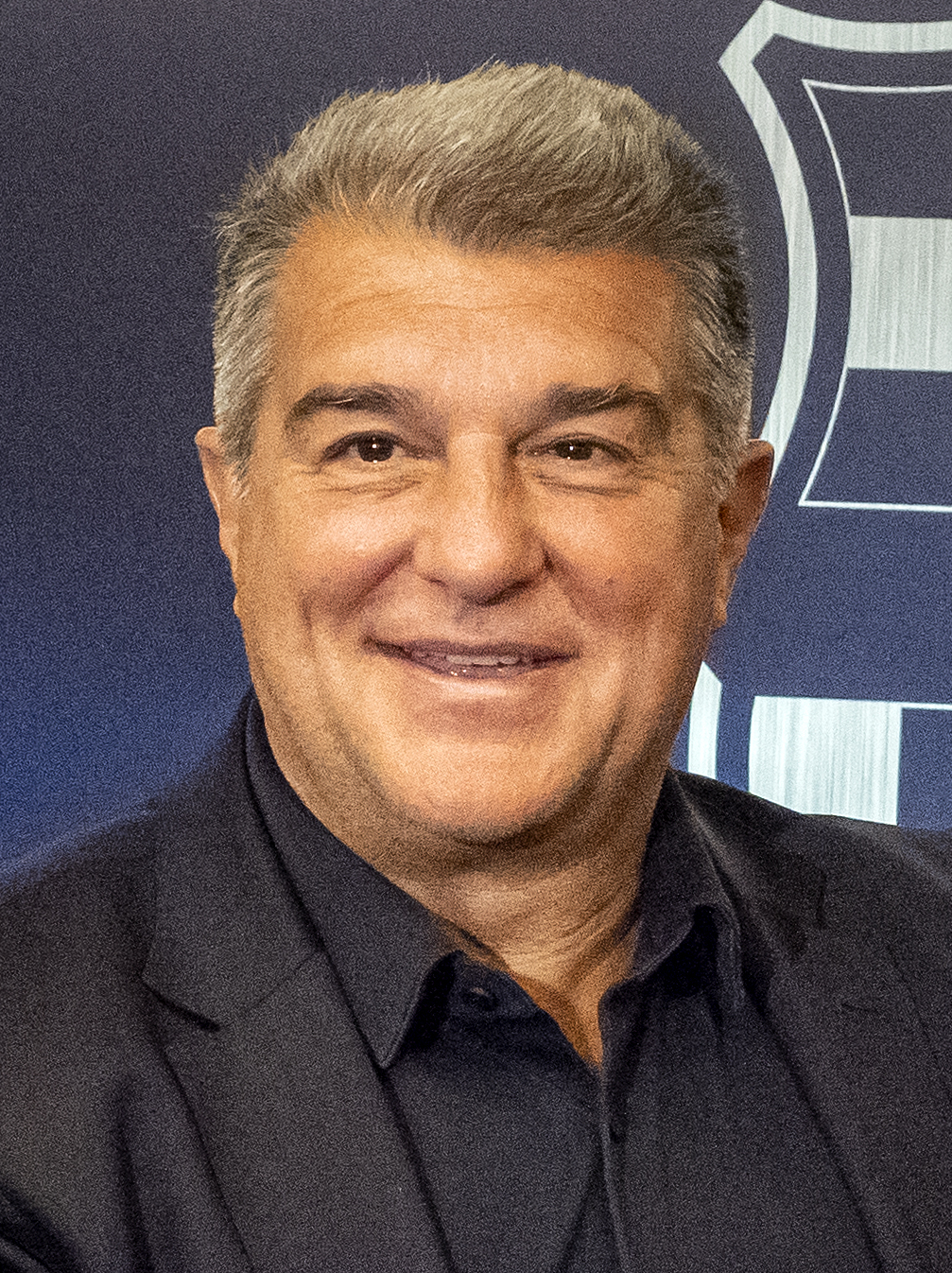

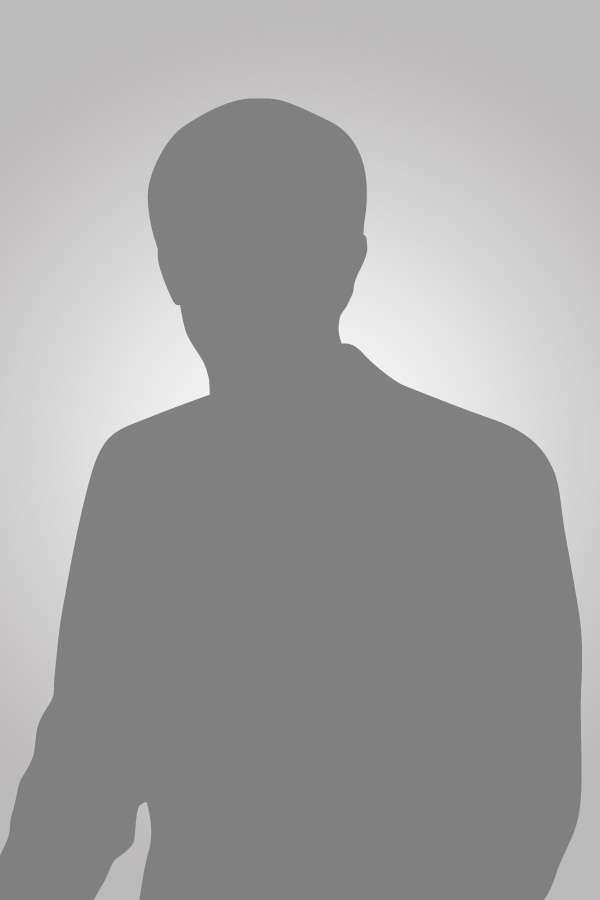

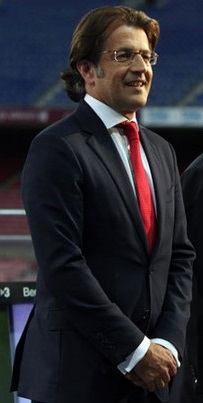
Candidate	Joan Laporta	Víctor Font	Toni Freixa
Alliance	Estimem el Barça	Sí al Futur	Fidels al Barça
Popular vote	30,184	16,679	4,769
Percentage	54.28%	29.99%	8.58%
President before election
Carles Tusquets (interim)
Elected President
Joan Laporta

The 2021 FC Barcelona presidential election took place on 7 March 2021 for electing the 41st President of the club.

== Background ==
Initially the election was to be held on 24 January 2021 but was later postponed due to the increased cases of COVID-19 in Spain in January. Carles Tusquets was the preceding interim president of the club who took over from Josep Maria Bartomeu after the latter resigned on 27 October 2020. However, Tusquets did not contest the elections. 9 pre candidates ran for the presidency. These include former club president Joan Laporta, Victor Font, Emili Rousaud, Toni Freixa, Jordi Farre, Augusti Benedito, Xavi Vilajoana, Lluis Fernández and Pere Riera.

In order to advance to the main election, the candidates had to collect a minimum of 2,257 signatures from club members. Joan Laporta, Victor Font and Toni Freixa were the only remaining candidates.

== Results ==
On 6 March, a day before the election, the club received a total of 20,663 votes by post early as those many members did not want to vote at the polling stations and cause crowds due to the pandemic. The remaining votes were cast on 7 March. Joan Laporta won, returning as president of FC Barcelona with 54.28% of the vote. Victor Font came second with 29.99% of the vote and Toni Freixa came third with 8.58% of the vote.

Candidate	Party	Votes	%
Joan Laporta	Estimem el Barça	30,184	58.46
Víctor Font	Sí al Futur	16,679	32.30
Toni Freixa	Fidels al Barça	4,769	9.24
Total		51,632	100.00
Valid votes		51,632	92.84
Invalid votes		3,628	6.52
Blank votes		351	0.63
Total votes		55,611	100.00
Registered voters/turnout		110,290	50.42
Source: https://www.fcbarcelona.cat/ca/eleccions-2021

== See also ==
- 2015 FC Barcelona presidential election
- History of FC Barcelona
- List of FC Barcelona presidents
