= Copa del Rey de Hockey Hielo =

The Copa del Rey is the national ice hockey cup competition in Spain. It was first contested in 1973.

== Winners ==
- 1973: Real Sociedad
- 1974: Real Sociedad
- 1975: Real Sociedad
- 1976: FC Barcelona
- 1977: FC Barcelona
- 1978: CH Casco Viejo Bilbao
- 1979: CHH Txuri Urdin
- 1980: CH Txuri Urdin
- 1981: CH Casco Viejo Bilbao
- 1982: FC Barcelona
- 1983: CG Puigcerdà
- 1984: CG Puigcerdà
- 1985: CH Jaca
- 1986: CG Puigcerdà
- 1987: CG Puigcerdà (U20 tournament)
- 1988: CH Jaca (U21 tournament)
- 1989: CH Jaca
- 1990: CHH Txuri Urdin
- 1991: CHH Txuri Urdin
- 1992: CG Puigcerdà
- 1993: CH Jaca
- 1994: CHH Txuri Urdin
- 1995: CH Jaca
- 1996: CH Jaca
- 1997: FC Barcelona
- 1998: CH Jaca
- 1999: CG Puigcerdà
- 2000: CHH Txuri Urdin
- 2001: CH Jaca
- 2002: CH Jaca
- 2003: CH Jaca
- 2004: CG Puigcerdà
- 2005: CG Puigcerdà
- 2006: CH Jaca
- 2007: CG Puigcerdà
- 2008: CG Puigcerdà
- 2009: CG Puigcerdà
- 2010: CG Puigcerdà
- 2011: CH Jaca
- 2012: CH Jaca
- 2013: CH Jaca
- 2014: Escor BAKH
- 2015: FC Barcelona
- 2016: Txuri Urdin
- 2017: CH Jaca
- 2018: Txuri Urdin
- 2019: FC Barcelona
- 2021: CH Jaca
- 2022: CG Puigcerdà
- 2023: CH Jaca
- 2024: CH Jaca
- 2025: CG Puigcerdà

== Titles by team ==
- CH Jaca (18): 1985, 1988, 1989, 1993, 1995, 1996, 1998, 2001, 2002, 2003, 2006, 2011, 2012, 2013, 2017, 2021, 2023, 2024.
- CG Puigcerdà (14): 1983, 1984, 1986, 1987, 1992, 1999, 2004, 2005, 2007, 2008, 2009, 2010, 2022, 2025.
- CH Txuri Urdin/Real Sociedad (12): 1972, 1973, 1974, 1975, 1979, 1980, 1990, 1991, 1994, 2000, 2016, 2018.
- FC Barcelona (6): 1976, 1977, 1982, 1997, 2015, 2019.
- CH Casco Viejo Bilbao (2): 1978, 1981
- Escor BAKH (1): 2014

=== Junior tournaments ===
- CG Puigcerdà (1): 1987 (U20 tournament)
- CH Jaca (1): 1988 (U21 tournament)
