= Mateu Alemany =

Spanish lawyer

Mateu Alemany Font
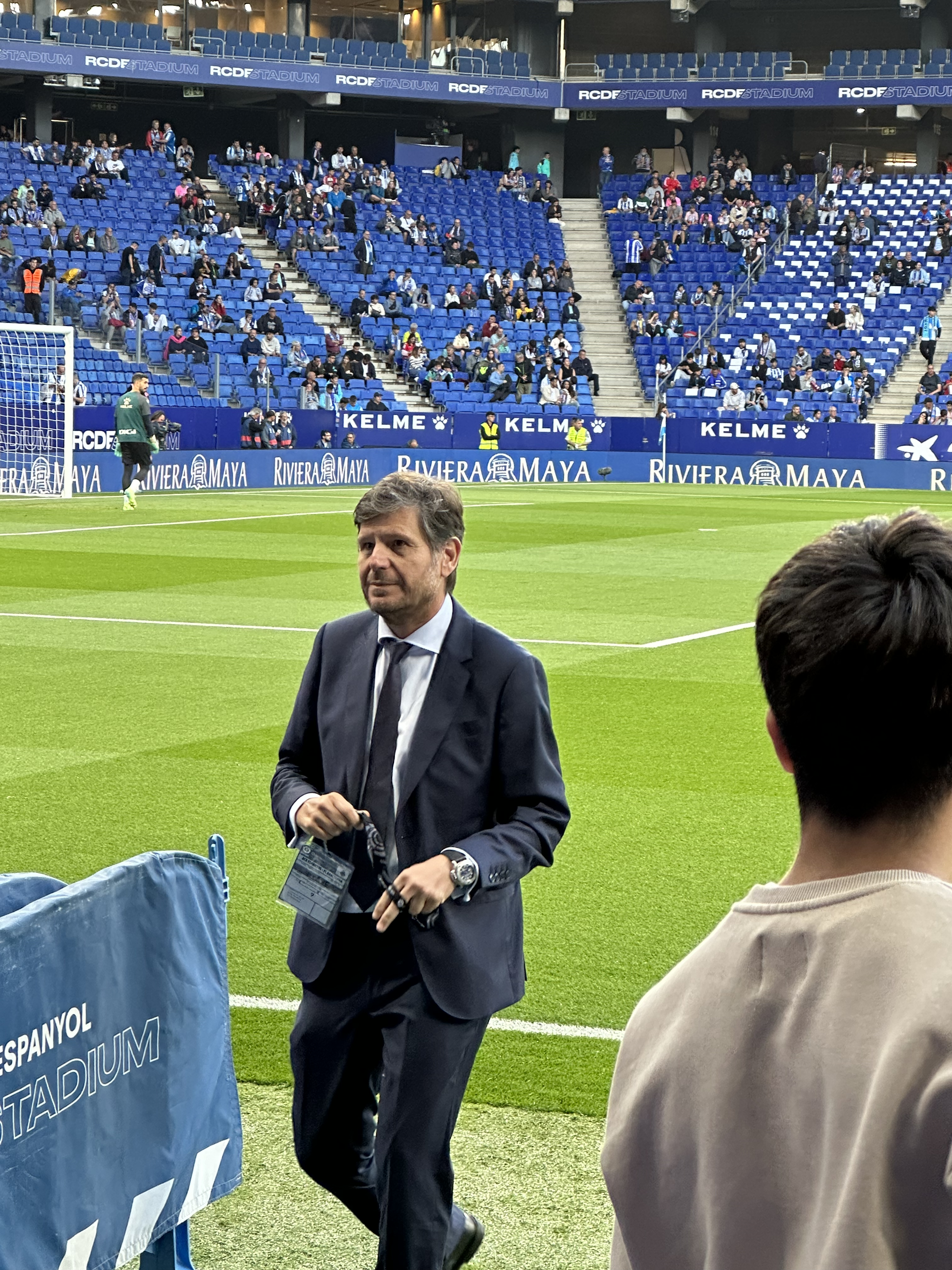
- Born: 24 February 1963 (age 63); Andratx, Balearic Islands, Spain
- Citizenship: Spanish
- Education: Law degree (1985), University of the Balearic Islands; Master's degree in Financial Accounting
- Occupations: Deputy managing director at Mallorca (1990–1993); CEO of RCD Mallorca (1993–2000); President of RCD Mallorca (2000–2005, 2009–2010); General director of Valencia (2017–2019); Football director of Barcelona (2021–2023); Football director of Atlético de Madrid (2025–)

Mateu Alemany Font (born 24 February 1963) is a Spanish executive and former president of Mallorca during two tenures. Between 2017 and November 2019 was the general director at Valencia. Between March 2021 and September 2023 he was a football director at FC Barcelona. Since October 2025 he is a football director at Atletico Madrid.

== Career path ==
Alemany was born on 24 February 1963 in Andratx. In 1985, he obtained a law degree from the University of the Balearic Islands; he later obtained a master's degree in Financial Accounting.

In 1990, he was made deputy managing director at Mallorca. In 1993, under the presidency of Bartolomé Beltrán he became the chief executive officer of the club.

During his period as CEO, the club experienced several institutional changes, such as the purchase of the club by Grupo Zeta and the arrival of Antonio Asensio as president.

Florentino Pérez won the elections for the presidency of Real Madrid in 2000, and offered Alemany the position of general director of the club, which Alemany rejected. Alemany then proceeded to take over the presidency of Mallorca, replacing Guillem Reynés. During the presidenсy of Alemany, Mallorca achieved victory in the 2003 Copa del Rey final, with goals scored by Walter Pandiani and Samuel Eto'o.

Alemany arranged the purchase of Eto'o for a club record £4.4 million fee; Eto'o departed Mallorca as the club's all-time leading domestic league scorer (54 goals) when he signed for Barcelona in the summer of 2004 for a transfer fee of €24 million, after lengthy, three-way negotiations with Mallorca and Madrid. In 2005, Alemany left the presidency of the club, as Mallorca was on the brink of relegation, in spite of several player signings and the return of manager Héctor Cúper.

In 2007, he led an unsuccessful candidacy for the presidency of the Royal Spanish Football Federation. In 2009 Alemany returned to Mallorca as club president. He left the role in June 2010, and sold his shares in the club to Lorenzo Serra Ferrer.

On 27 March 2017, Alemany was named the general director of Valencia. On 7 November 2019, he was dismissed from the position.

On 26 March 2021, he took office as football director of Barcelona under the presidency of Joan Laporta. He was initially set to leave on 30 June 2023, but decided to stay, but then decided to leave again after new sporting director Deco was given full power. He officially left Barcelona on 2 September 2023.
