= Benoît Pourtanel =

French ice hockey player

Personal information
- Nationality: French
- Born: 12 April 1974 (age 50); Ris-Orangis, France

Sport
- Sport: Ice hockey

Benoît Pourtanel (born 12 April 1974) is a French ice hockey player. He competed in the men's tournament at the 2002 Winter Olympics.
