= CH Gel Barcelona =

- City: Barcelona, Spain
- League: Superliga Espanola de Hockey Hielo
- Founded: 1979

CH Gel Barcelona was an ice hockey team in Barcelona, Spain. They played in the Superliga Espanola de Hockey Hielo from 1979-1986.

== History ==
The club was founded in 1979, and started playing in the Superliga Espanola de Hockey Hielo. After finishing eighth in their first two seasons, they were relegated to the Segunda Division, in which they came second, and were thus promoted for the 1982 season. They played the 1983 and 1984 seasons in the Superliga, and were then relegated again. They won the Segunda Division in 1985, and were promoted again to the Superliga. They folded after the 1986 season.

== Results ==
- 1980 - 8th place
- 1981 - 8th place
- 1982 - 2nd place in Segunda Division
- 1983 - 5th place
- 1984 - 6th place
- 1985 - 1st place in Segunda Division
- 1986 - 4th place
