= CH Madrid =

- City: Madrid, Spain
- League: Superliga Espanola de Hockey Hielo
- Founded: 1972
- Home arena: Palacio de Hielo Dreams
- Colours: Blue, White

CH Madrid is an ice hockey team in Madrid, Spain. It played in the Superliga Espanola de Hockey Hielo from 1972-1975 and 2002-2006.

== History ==
The club was started in 1972 and was one of the six founding members of the Superliga. In their first season, Madrid finished as runner-up in the Superliga. It played in the Superliga from 1972-1975. The club was revived for the 2002-03 season. CH Madrid has only participated in unofficial tournaments and friendly games since 2006.

== Results ==
- 1973 2nd place
- 1974 3rd place
- 1975 ?
- 1976-2003 Did not participate
- 2003 Lost semifinal
- 2004 5th place
- 2005 5th place
- 2006 Lost quarterfinal
