= CH Boadilla =

- City: Boadilla del Monte, Spain
- League: Superliga Espanola de Hockey Hielo
- Founded: 1979
- Home arena: Palacio de Hielo Dreams

CH Boadilla is an ice hockey team in Boadilla del Monte, Spain. They played in the Superliga Espanola de Hockey Hielo from 1979-1990.

== History ==
CH Boadilla was founded in 1979 as the successor club to CH Madrid. The club struggled in their first two years in the Superliga, and were relegated to the Segunda Division. They then promptly won the Segunda Division, and were promoted again to the Superliga. They were then again relegated to the Segunda Division, which they then won in the 1983-84 season, and were thus promoted again. They finished in 5th place in 1985 and in 6th place in 1989 and 1990. The club has consisted solely of junior teams since 1990.

== Results ==
- 1980 6th place
- 1981 7th place
- 1982 1st in Segunda Division
- 1983 6th place
- 1984 1st in Segunda Division
- 1985 6th
- 1986-1988 No championship
- 1989 6th place
- 1990 6th place
