= Liga Nacional de Hockey Hielo =

Spanish men's ice hockey league

- Current season, competition or edition: 2025–26 Liga Nacional de Hockey Hielo season
- Sport: Ice hockey
- Founded: 1972
- Founder: RFEDH
- First season: 1972–73
- No. of teams: 5
- Country: Spain
- Most recent champions: Jaca (16th title) (2025–26)
- Most titles: Jaca (16 titles)
- Broadcaster: LaLigaSports
- Related competitions: Liga Nacional Femenina
- Website: fedhielo.com

The National Ice Hockey League (Spanish: Liga Nacional de Hockey sobre Hielo) is the top men's professional ice hockey league in Spain. Its governing body is the Royal Spanish Ice Sports Federation.

== History ==
Liga Nacional de Hockey Hielo was established in 1972 as the Superliga Española de Hockey Hielo. There were six founding teams which participated in the first season, 1972–73: Real Sociedad, CH Jaca, CH Valladolid, CG Puigcerdà, CH Madrid and CF Barcelona.

In 2011, the league was composed of eight teams, but due to financial problems with almost all the clubs, the league reduced the number of participants year after year until only five of them were left. In order to grow ice hockey in Spain, in the 2021/2022 season two teams composed of non-Spanish players and one composed of Spanish players joined the league, bringing the number of teams back to eight, with the door open to new ones in the future.

HC Porto, led by the Portugal national team coach Jim Aldred, joined the league in 2023. HC Porto was ineligible to compete for the Spanish championship, and played its "home" games at the arena of the opposing team.

== Competition ==
=== Format ===
The regular season of Liga Nacional de Hockey Hielo takes place between September and February, with every team playing each other three times (two in home and one away or one home and two away) for a total of 21 matches. Points are awarded according to the following:

- 3 points for a win
- 2 points for a win in extra time
- 1 point for a loss in extra time
- 0 points for a loss

=== Playoffs ===
Upon completion of the regular season, the top four teams play in the championship playoffs. The playoffs are a best of three series, in the semifinals (where 4th plays against 1st, and 3rd plays against 2nd), and a best of five in the final.

== Champions by season ==
- 1973: Real Sociedad HH
- 1974: Real Sociedad HH
- 1975: Real Sociedad HH
- 1976: CHH Txuri Urdin
- 1977: Casco Viejo Bilbao
- 1978: Casco Viejo Bilbao
- 1979: Casco Viejo Bilbao
- 1980: CHH Txuri Urdin
- 1981: Casco Viejo Bilbao
- 1982: Casco Viejo Bilbao
- 1983: Casco Viejo Bilbao
- 1984: CH Jaca
- 1985: CHH Txuri Urdin
- 1986: CG Puigcerdà
- 1987: FC Barcelona ^{(1)}
- 1988: FC Barcelona ^{(2)}
- 1989: CG Puigcerdà
- 1990: CHH Txuri Urdin
- 1991: CH Jaca
- 1992: CHH Txuri Urdin
- 1993: CHH Txuri Urdin
- 1994: CH Jaca
- 1995: CHH Txuri Urdin
- 1996: CH Jaca
- 1997: FC Barcelona
- 1998: Majadahonda HC
- 1999: CHH Txuri Urdin
- 2000: CHH Txuri Urdin
- 2001: CH Jaca
- 2002: FC Barcelona
- 2003: CH Jaca
- 2004: CH Jaca
- 2005: CH Jaca
- 2006: CG Puigcerdà
- 2007: CG Puigcerdà
- 2008: CG Puigcerdà
- 2009: FC Barcelona
- 2010: CH Jaca
- 2011: CH Jaca
- 2012: CH Jaca
- 2013: Escor Auto Avendaño
- 2014: Escor BAKH
- 2015: CH Jaca
- 2016: CH Jaca
- 2017: Txuri Urdin
- 2018: Txuri Urdin
- 2019: Txuri Urdin
- 2020: CG Puigcerdà
- 2021: FC Barcelona
- 2022: FC Barcelona
- 2023: CH Jaca
- 2024: CH Jaca
- 2025: CG Puigcerdà
- 2026: CH Jaca

^{(1)} Under 20 category

^{(2)} Under 21 category

== Titles by team ==
Club	Titles	Year
Jaca	16	1984, 1991, 1994, 1996, 2001, 2003, 2004, 2005, 2010, 2011, 2012, 2015, 2016, 2023, 2024, 2026
CHH Txuri Urdin	12	1976, 1980, 1985, 1990, 1992, 1993, 1995, 1999, 2000, 2017, 2018, 2019
FC Barcelona	7	1987, 1988, 1997, 2002, 2009, 2021, 2022
CG Puigcerdà	7	1986, 1989, 2006, 2007, 2008, 2020, 2025
CH Casco Viejo Bilbao (CH Vizcaya)	6	1977, 1978, 1979, 1981, 1982, 1983
Real Sociedad	3	1973, 1974, 1975
CD Hielo Bipolo	2	2013, 2014
Majadahonda HC	1	1998
