= CH Casco Viejo Bilbao =

Spanish ice hockey team

- City: Bilbao, Spain
- League: Superliga Espanola de Hockey Hielo
- Founded: 1975
- Colours: Blue, White

Franchise history
- 1975-1981: CH Casco Viejo Bilbao
- 1981-1986: CH Vizcaya Bilbao

CH Casco Viejo Bilbao was an ice hockey team in Bilbao, Spain. They played in the Superliga Espanola de Hockey Hielo from 1975 to 1986.

== History ==
CH Casco Viejo Bilbao was founded in 1975 and immediately started playing in the Superliga Espanola de Hockey Hielo, the top league in Spain. They reached the final in their first year, and won the Spanish championship for the first time in 1977. They won the title again in 1978, 1979 and 1981. Before the 1981–82 season the club changed its name to CH Vizcaya Bilbao. It was followed by two more championship titles (1982 and 1983), and a runner-up finish in the Copa del Rey (1982). The club was disbanded in 1986.

== Achievements ==
- Spanish champion : 1977, 1978, 1979, 1981, 1982, 1983
- Spanish runner-up : 1980
- Copa del Rey champion : 1978, 1981
- Copa del Rey runner-up : 1976, 1982
