= SAD Majadahonda =

Spanish ice hockey team

- City: Majadahonda, Spain
- League: Liga Nacional de Hockey Hielo
- Founded: 1992; 34 years ago
- Operated: 1992–present
- Home arena: Pista de hielo La Nevera (capacity: 250)
- Colours: Black, red, white

Franchise history
- 1992–2001: SAD Majadahonda
- 2001–2002: CH Majadahonda
- 2004–2007: SAD Majadahonda
- 2007–2011: CH Majadahonda
- 2011–present: SAD Majadahonda

Majadahonda HC (previously known as CH Majadahonda) is an ice hockey team in Majadahonda, Spain. They play in the Liga Nacional de Hockey Hielo.

== History ==
They were founded in 1992 to replace CH Boadilla, which had folded two years earlier. The club did not participate in the Superliga from 2002 to 2004, but returned to the league in 2004 and has played there ever since. They won the Superliga in 1998, and made it to the semifinals of the Copa del Rey in 1998 and 2002.

In the 2024–25 season, Majadahonda played its first home games versus HC Porto, led by the Portugal national team coach Jim Aldred. The match was delayed when Porto' equipment did not arrive on the same flight as the players. Majadahonda loaned their away jerseys and extra equipment to play the game, which they won by a 5–1 score. When the lost equipment arrived, the next day's game was played resulting in 2–1 victory for HC Porto.

== Notable players ==
Swede Kent Nilsson played for the team in 1997–98.
