= CH Gasteiz =

- City: Vitoria, Spain
- League: Superliga Espanola de Hockey Hielo
- Founded: 2014
- Home arena: Pista de hielo Vitoria-Gasteiz

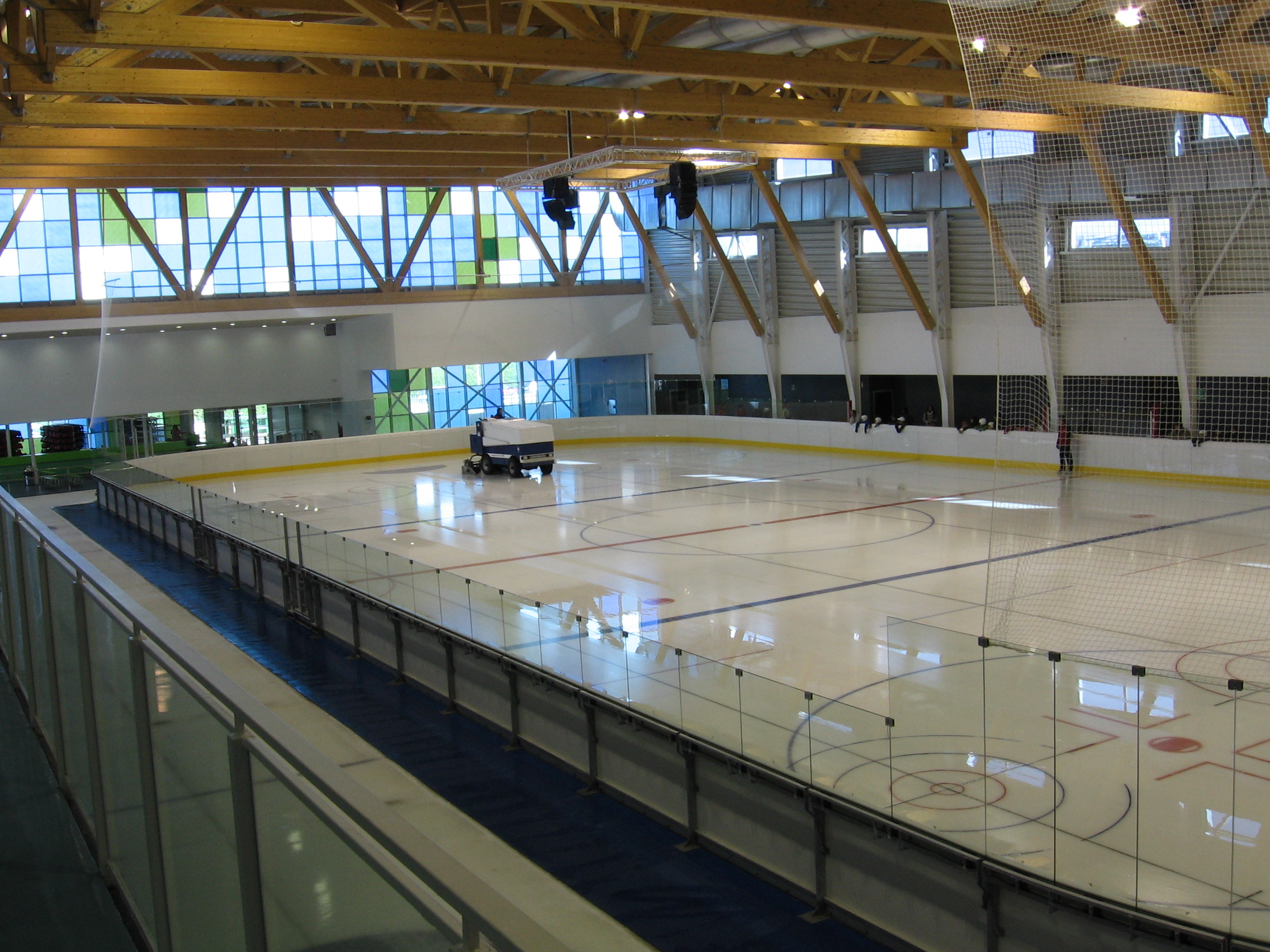
Ice rink at the Baskonia sports center, Salburua, Vitoria-Gasteiz, Álava, Basque Country, Spain

CH Gasteiz is an ice hockey team in Vitoria, Spain. They play in the Superliga Espanola de Hockey Hielo, the top level of ice hockey in Spain.

== History ==
CH Gasteiz was founded in 1975, and began playing in the Superliga. The team did not participate in the 1976–77 season, but returned from 1978 to 1982. The club was relegated to the Segunda Division for the 1983 season. They won the league title, and were thus promoted back to the Superliga. Gasteiz continued playing in the Superliga until it suspended operations from 1986 to 1988. The club then participated from 1988 to 2005, before taking two years off from 2005 to 2007. They returned to the Superliga from 2007 to 2009.

After the 2008–09 season, the club was dissolved.

== Achievements ==
- Segunda Division champion: 1983
