= CHH Txuri Urdin =

Basque ice hockey club

CHH Txuri Urdin IHT
- City: Donostia–San Sebastián, Basque Country, Spain
- League: Liga Nacional de Hockey Hielo
- Founded: 1972
- Operated: 1972–present
- Home arena: Txuri Urdin Izotz Jauregia
- Colours: Blue, white
- Head coach: Alain Iturralde (men)
- Captain: Imanol Lasuen Adarraga (men); Maria Serna Ezcurdia (women)
- Website: Official website

Championships
- Spanish Championship (men): 12 (1976, 1980, 1985, 1990, 1992, 1993, 1995, 1999, 2000, 2017, 2018, 2019)
- Spanish Championship (women): 1 (2022)

The Club Hockey Hielo Txuri Urdin Izotz Hockey Taldea (Spanish: Club Hockey Hielo, lit. 'Ice Hockey Club' + Basque: Txuri Urdin Izotz Hockey Taldea, lit. 'White Blue Ice Hockey Team'), abbreviated CHH Txuri Urdin IHT, is a Basque ice hockey club based in Donostia–San Sebastián, in the Basque Country autonomous community of northeastern Spain. Its teams play at the Txuri Urdin Izotz Jauregia (Spanish: Palacio del Hielo Txuri Urdin).

== Teams ==
=== Men's team ===
The men's representative team was founded in 1972 as the reserve team of Real Sociedad HH, one of the six founding clubs of the Superliga Española, the predecessor of the Liga Nacional de Hockey Hielo (LNHH). They made their Superliga Española debut in the 1974–75 season.

The team plays in the LNHH, where they have won twelve Spanish Championship titles, the second-most titles won by any club in league history (after CH Jaca) and they have been the Spanish Championship runner-up seven times. The Txuri Urdin men's team are also eight-time winners of the Copa del Rey de Hockey Hielo and won the Euskal Herriko Kopa (lit. 'Basque Country Cup') in 1993.

=== Women's team ===
The women's representative team has played in the Liga Nacional de Hockey Hielo Femenino (LNHHF; also known as the Liga Iberdrola de Hockey Hielo for sponsorship reasons) since the 2014–15 season. In 2022, they claimed their first Spanish Championship title as league champions and also won their first Copa de la Reina de Hockey Hielo Femenino; the team had previously been Spanish Championship runners-up in 2019 and 2022. As Spanish Champions and winners of the Copa de la Reina, the Txuri Urdin women's team earned a place in the 2023 tournament of the EWHL Super Cup.

== Achievements ==
=== Men's team ===
Liga Nacional de Hockey Hielo

- Spanish Champions (12): 1976, 1980, 1985, 1990, 1992, 1993, 1995, 1999, 2000, 2017, 2018, 2019
- Runners up (7): 1978, 1979, 1991, 1994, 2005, 2016, 2020

Copa del Rey de Hockey Hielo

- Copa del Rey champions (8): 1979, 1980, 1990, 1991, 1994, 2000, 2016, 2018

Euskal Herriko Kopa

- Champions (1): 1993

=== Women's team ===
Liga Nacional de Hockey Hielo Femenino

- Spanish Champions (1): 2022
- Runners-up (2): 2019, 2021

Copa de la Reina de Hockey Hielo Femenino

- Copa de la Reina champions (1): 2022
