= FC Barcelona Ice Hockey =

- Nickname: Barca
- City: Barcelona, Spain
- League: Iberian Ice Hockey League; Liga Nacional de Hockey Hielo
- Founded: 1899 Club; 1972 Ice hockey
- Home arena: Palau de Gel (capacity: 1,256)
- Colors
- General manager: Miren Uriarte
- Head coach: Danylo Didkovsky
- Parent club: FC Barcelona
| Home colours | Away colours |

Championships
- Playoff championships: 7; 1987, 1988, 1997, 2002, 2009, 2021, 2022

FC Barcelona Ice Hockey is a professional ice hockey club in Barcelona, Catalonia, that is part of FC Barcelona club. They currently play in the Spanish League and their home arena is the Palau de Gel.

== History ==
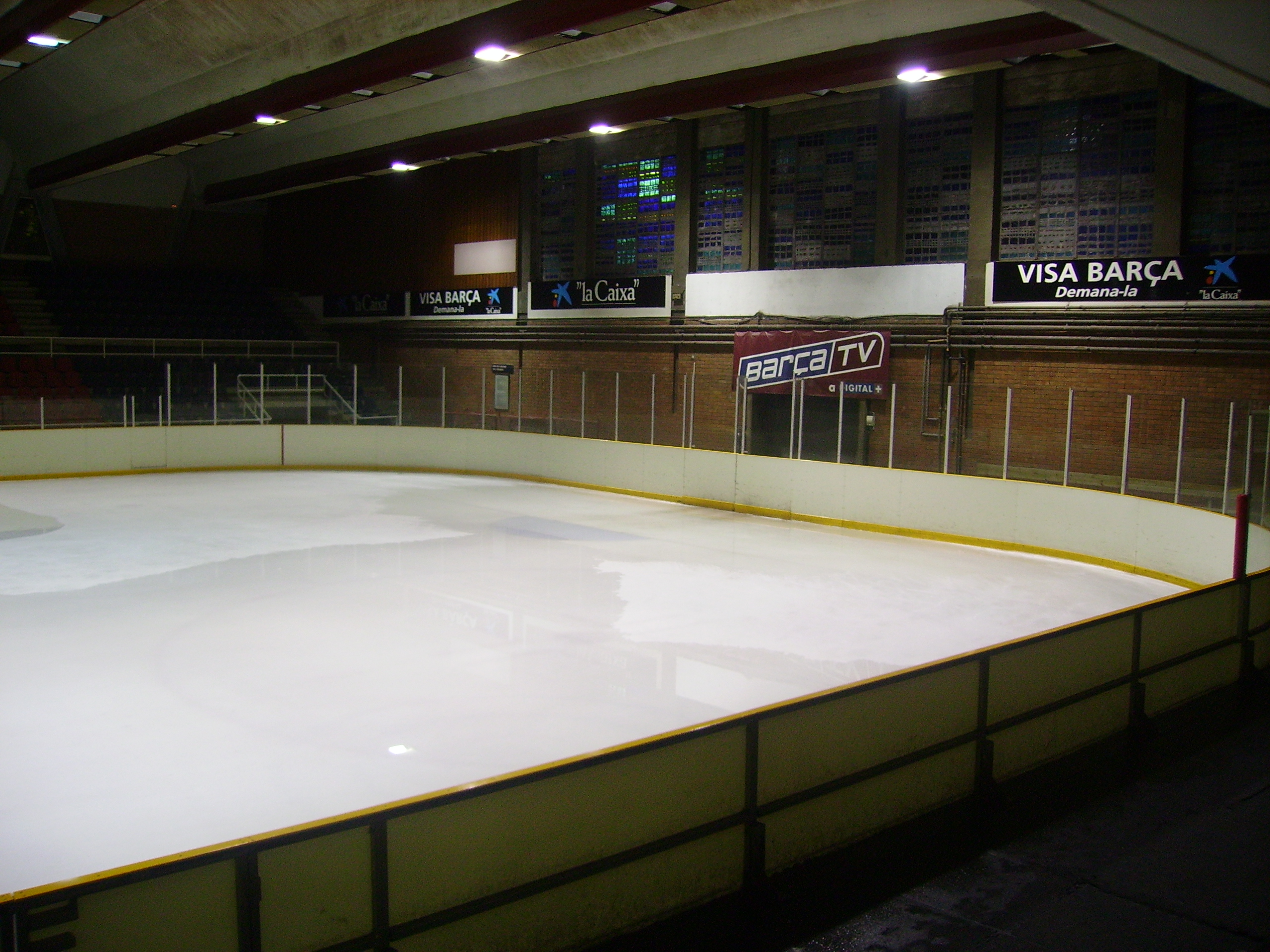
Palau de Gel

The team was founded in 1972, after the construction of the Pista de Gel. The first game was played on September 15, 1972 against a team from the US Navy anchored in the Port of Barcelona; the home team won 7-5. The first title was the Spanish Cup in 1976. In the mid-eighties, the senior team was disbanded leaving only the junior team. In 1986, the Spanish Hockey Federation decided to apply the same decision taken by the Catalan club and not carry out the high-level competition. In that season FC Barcelona won the championship for players under 20 years of age. In the National Cup organized for players under 20 years of age, Barça lost in the final against Puigcerdà. In 1990, the club returned to top competition, and after that, won the league and the Spanish Cup in the 1996-97 season completing a double. Since then, the club has enjoyed many successes, including winning 4 league titles and 2 Copa del Rey.

== Titles ==
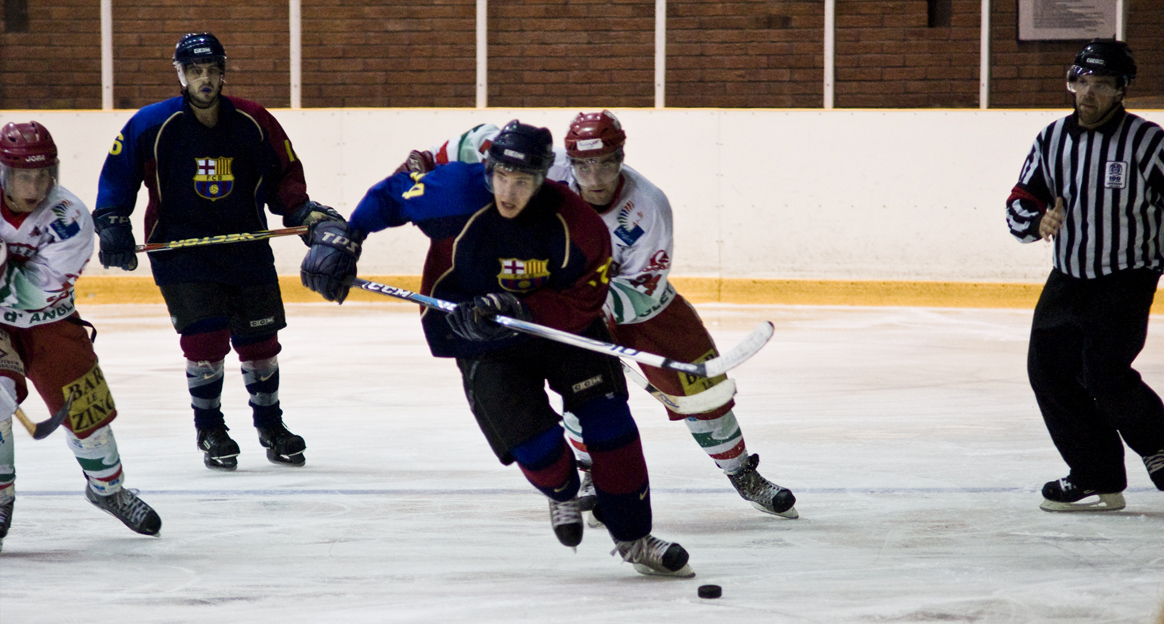
A Barcelona player carries the puck with two opposing players in chase.

- 7 Liga Nacional de Hockey Hielo: 1986–87, 1987–88, 1996–97, 2001–02, 2008–09, 2020–21, 2021–22
- 6 Copa del Rey de Hockey Hielo: 1975–76, 1976–77, 1981–82, 1996–97, 2014–15, 2018–19
