= Club Hielo Jaca =

Spanish ice hockey team

CH Jaca
- City: Jaca, Spain
- League: Iberian Ice Hockey League; Liga Nacional de Hockey Hielo
- Founded: 1972
- Home arena: Palacio de Hielo de Los Pireneos
- Colours: Red, white
- Head coach: Bobby Robbins
- Website: www.clubhielojaca.com

Franchise history
- 1972–present: CH Jaca

Club Hielo Jaca, also known as Aramón Hielo Jaca for sponsorship reasons, is a Spanish professional ice hockey team that currently plays in the country's professional league, the Liga Nacional de Hockey Hielo. They have won 16 league championships, most recently in 2026, being the most laureated ice hockey team in the Spanish Hockey League. They play their home games in Jaca, Aragon, Spain.

== Achievements ==
- Iberian Ice Hockey League:
  - Winners (1): 2025
- Spanish Hockey League:
  - Winners (16): 1984, 1991, 1994, 1996, 2001, 2003, 2004, 2005, 2010, 2011, 2012, 2015, 2016, 2023, 2024, 2026
- Copa del Rey (Ice Hockey):
  - Winners (17): 1985, 1988, 1989, 1993, 1995, 1996, 1998, 2000, 2001, 2002, 2003, 2006, 2011, 2012, 2021, 2023, 2024
