= Club Gel Puigcerdà =

Spanish professional ice hockey team

- City: Puigcerdà, Catalonia, Spain
- League: Liga Nacional de Hockey Hielo
- Founded: 1956
- Home arena: Club Poliesportiu Puigcerdà
- Colours
- General manager: Tomás Torrent
- Head coach: Salvador Barnola
- Website: Clubgelpuigcerda.com

Club Gel Puigcerdà is a Spanish professional ice hockey team in Puigcerdà, Catalonia. They play in the Liga Nacional de Hockey Hielo and their home arena is the Club Poliesportiu Puigcerdà.

== History ==
Club Gel Puigcerdà was founded in 1956 when a team created in the school Pensionat d'Alta Muntanya played the first match on the frozen lake of Puigcerdà. The ice hockey venue was inaugurated in 1958 with an international festival of ice. From this festival, the hockey clubs of the village as AEP (Alumni of the School Pia) played several games, so with Catalan teams or foreign. In 1983 was inaugurated the current pavilion where the club plays. On 8 August 2006 the women team of CG Puigcerdà played their first match.

Club Gel Puigcerdà won their sixth and seventh Liga Nacional de Hockey Hielo playoffs championships in 2020, and 2025.

== Championships ==
- 5 Spanish leagues: 1985-86, 1988–89, 2005–06, 2006–07, 2007–08
- 13 Spanish ice hockey cups: 1982-83, 1983–84, 1985–86, 1991–92, 1998–99, 2003–04, 2004–05, 2006–07, 2007–08, 2008–09, 2009–10, 2019–20, 2024–25
- 2 Federation cups: 2005-06, 2006–07
- 5 Catalan ice hockey cups: 1984-85, 2002–03, 2003–04, 2005–06, 2007–08
- 1 u18-Spanish Leagues: 1997-98
- 1 u20 Spanish ice hockey cup: 1986-87
