= 2018 IIHF Women's World Championship Division I =

International ice hockey tournament

Tournament details
- Host countries: France; Italy
- Venues: 2 (in 2 host cities)
- Dates: 8–14 April 2018
- Teams: 12

The 2018 IIHF Women's World Championship Division I consisted of two international ice hockey tournaments organized by the International Ice Hockey Federation. Division I A and Division I B represent the second and third tier of the IIHF Women's World Championship.

France won the Division I Group A tournament and moved up to the Top Division, while Italy became the champions of Division I Group B and will play in the Division I Group A tournament next year.

Similar to last year, there are no relegations to lower divisions this year either.

== Division I Group A ==
2018 IIHF Women's World Championship Division I A

Tournament details
- Host country: France
- City: Vaujany
- Venue: 1 (in 1 host city)
- Dates: 8–14 April 2018
- Teams: 6

Tournament statistics
- Games played: 15
- Goals scored: 85 (5.67 per game)
- Attendance: 5,401 (360 per game)
- Scoring leader: (Hungary) Fanni Gasparics (10 points)

Official website
- www.iihf.com

The Division I Group A tournament was played in Vaujany, France, from 8 to 14 April 2018.

=== Participating teams ===
Team	Qualification
Austria	Placed 2nd in Division I A last year.
Norway	Placed 3rd in Division I A last year.
Denmark	Placed 4th in Division I A last year.
Hungary	Placed 5th in Division I A last year.
France	Hosts; placed 6th in Division I A last year.
Slovakia	Placed 1st in Division I B last year and were promoted.

=== Match officials ===
4 referees and 7 linesmen were selected for the tournament.

Referees

- (Finland) Henna Åberg
- (United States) Kristine Langley
- (Canada) Meghan MacTavish
- (Germany) Ramona Weiss

Linesmen

- (France) Anne Boniface
- (Canada) Stéphanie Gagnon
- (Finland) Jenni Jaatinen
- (Slovakia) Michaela Kúdeľová
- (Sweden) Jessica Lundgren
- (United States) Sara Strong
- (France) Sueva Torribio

=== Final standings ===
Pos	Team	Pld	W	OTW	OTL	L	GF	GA	GD	Pts	Promotion
1	France (H)	5	4	0	0	1	16	8	+8	12	Promoted to the 2019 Top Division
2	Austria	5	3	0	0	2	19	15	+4	9 (Note: Austria 6–4 Hungary)	
3	Hungary	5	3	0	0	2	21	13	+8	9	
4	Denmark	5	2	0	0	3	14	15	−1	6 (Note: Norway 0–1 Denmark)	
5	Norway	5	2	0	0	3	7	10	−3	6	
6	Slovakia	5	1	0	0	4	8	24	−16	3	

Source: IIHF
Rules for classification: 1) points; 2) head-to-head points; 3) head-to-head goal difference; 4) head-to-head number of goals scored; 5) result against closest best-ranked team outside tied teams; 6) result against second-best-ranked team outside tied teams; 7) seeding before tournament.
(H) Host

=== Match results ===
All times are local (Central European Summer Time – UTC+2).

8 April 2018; 12:30	Slovakia	3–2 (0–1, 2–0, 1–1)	Austria	Vaujany Arena, Vaujany; Attendance: 70

Game reference

Romana Kiapešová
Goalies
Jessica Ekrt
Referee:
(Finland) Henna Åberg
Linesmen:
(France) Anne Boniface
(Canada) Stéphanie Gagnon

	0–1	02:02 – Altmann
Čurmová (Košecká) (PP) – 28:55	1–1
Matejková – 36:17	2–1
	2–2	42:07 – Altmann (Meixner)
Klimášová (T. Ištocyová) – 50:56	3–2

4 min
Penalties
10 min
30
Shots
30

8 April 2018; 16:00	France	3–2 (1–1, 0–1, 2–0)	Denmark	Vaujany Arena, Vaujany; Attendance: 709

Game reference

Caroline Baldin
Goalies
Cassandra Repstock-Romme
Referee:
(United States) Kristine Langley
Linesmen:
(Slovakia) Michaela Kúdeľová
(United States) Sara Strong

	0–1	10:46 – Glud (Jakobsen, Asperup) (PP)
Jouanny – 16:16	1–1
	1–2	38:18 – Glud (N. Jensen)
Duvin (Rozier) – 52:23	2–2
Aurard (Escudero) – 59:09	3–2

12 min
Penalties
10 min
21
Shots
26

8 April 2018; 19:30	Hungary	5–4 (1–0, 2–3, 2–1)	Norway	Vaujany Arena, Vaujany; Attendance: 107

Game reference

Anikó Németh
Goalies
Linnea Holterud
Referee:
(Canada) Meghan MacTavish
Linesmen:
(Sweden) Jessica Lundgren
(France) Sueva Torribio

Nooren (Jókai Szilágyi) – 01:28	1–0
	1–1	20:14 – Bialik (Biseth Engmann)
	1–2	23:08 – Fjellvang (Dalen)
	1–3	30:14 – Tendenes (Bialik)
Gasparics (Kiss) – 31:43	2–3
Dabasi (T. Horváth) – 32:50	3–3
Grkovic (Gasparics) (PP) – 41:41	4–3
Huszák (Gasparics) (PP) – 49:28	5–3
	5–4	50:45 – Haug Hansen (Fischer)

6 min
Penalties
8 min
29
Shots
26

9 April 2018; 12:30	Denmark	6–3 (2–1, 2–2, 2–0)	Slovakia	Vaujany Arena, Vaujany; Attendance: 168

Game reference

Emma-Sofie Nordström
Goalies
Romana Kiapešová
Referee:
(Finland) Henna Åberg
Linesmen:
(Finland) Jenni Jaatinen
(United States) Sara Strong

	0–1	04:55 – Matejková (Maskalová)
Gregersen (Jakobsen) (PP) – 07:36	1–1
Brix (Persson, Frandsen) – 15:06	2–1
	2–2	29:04 – Klimášová (Matejková)
Glud (Jakobsen) – 30:35	3–2
Jakobsen (Glud, N. Jensen) – 36:07	4–2
	4–3	37:02 – T. Ištocyová (Čurmová, Kúbeková) (PP)
Glud (Jakobsen, N. Jensen) (PP) – 43:26	5–3
Glud (Jakobsen, N. Jensen) – 56:20	6–3

12 min
Penalties
12 min
42
Shots
23

9 April 2018; 16:00	Austria	6–4 (0–2, 5–1, 1–1)	Hungary	Vaujany Arena, Vaujany; Attendance: 189

Game reference

Theresa Hornich
Goalies
Anikó Németh
Referee:
(United States) Kristine Langley
Linesmen:
(Sweden) Jessica Lundgren
(France) Sueva Torribio

	0–1	05:34 – Nooren (T. Horváth)
	0–2	19:38 – Gasparics (Kiss-Simon, Pintér)
Altmann (Matzka) – 29:10	1–2
Schafzahl (Meixner, Fazokas) (PP) – 32:09	2–2
Meixner (Schafzahl) – 34:28	3–2
	3–3	35:26 – Gasparics (Nooren)
Verworner – 36:54	4–3
Weber (Hummel, Beiter) (PP) – 38:40	5–3
Beiter (Trummer, Altmann) – 55:06	6–3
	6–4	57:31 – Gasparics (Tóth)

6 min
Penalties
8 min
32
Shots
28

9 April 2018; 19:30	Norway	2–1 (1–0, 1–0, 0–1)	France	Vaujany Arena, Vaujany; Attendance: 799

Game reference

Linnea Holterud
Goalies
Caroline Baldin
Referee:
(Germany) Ramona Weiss
Linesmen:
(Canada) Stéphanie Gagnon
(Slovakia) Michaela Kúdeľová

Dalen (PP) – 29:10	1–0
Dalen (SH) – 32:49	2–0
	2–1	53:35 – Baudrit (Escudero, Jouanny) (PP)

14 min
Penalties
6 min
27
Shots
20

11 April 2018; 12:30	Norway	0–1 (0–0, 0–0, 0–1)	Denmark	Vaujany Arena, Vaujany; Attendance: 143

Game reference
Ena Nystrøm	Goalies	Emma-Sofie Nordström	Referee: (United States) Kristine Langley; Linesmen: (France) Anne Boniface (Sweden) Jessica Lundgren
0–1 / 48:26 – Glud (N. Jensen)			Referee: (United States) Kristine Langley; Linesmen: (France) Anne Boniface (Sweden) Jessica Lundgren
10 min	Penalties	10 min	Referee: (United States) Kristine Langley; Linesmen: (France) Anne Boniface (Sweden) Jessica Lundgren
21	Shots	26	Referee: (United States) Kristine Langley; Linesmen: (France) Anne Boniface (Sweden) Jessica Lundgren

11 April 2018; 16:00	Slovakia	1–8 (0–3, 0–2, 1–3)	Hungary	Vaujany Arena, Vaujany; Attendance: 206

Game reference

Romana Kiapešová
Adriána Štofanková
Goalies
Anikó Németh
Referee:
(Germany) Ramona Weiss
Linesmen:
(United States) Sara Strong
(France) Sueva Torribio

	0–1	07:43 – Huszák (Tóth, Nooren)
	0–2	16:17 – Huszák (Dabasi, T. Horváth)
	0–3	18:12 – Huszák (Dabasi, T. Horváth)
	0–4	35:30 – Gasparics (T. Horváth, Huszák)
	0–5	36:29 – Nooren (Gowie, Jókai Szilágyi)
	0–6	44:35 – Gowie (Nooren)
	0–7	48:43 – T. Horváth (Gasparics) (PP2)
	0–8	51:02 – Ungár (Brgles, K. Jókai Szilágyi) (PP)
Záborská (T. Ištocyová, L. Šuliková) (PP) – 52:49	1–8

20 min
Penalties
4 min
17
Shots
44

11 April 2018; 19:30	Austria	2–3 (2–1, 0–1, 0–1)	France	Vaujany Arena, Vaujany; Attendance: 800

Game reference

Theresa Hornich
Goalies
Caroline Baldin
Referee:
(Canada) Meghan MacTavish
Linesmen:
(Canada) Stéphanie Gagnon
(Finland) Jenni Jaatinen

Grascher (Hummel, Fazokas) – 02:03	1–0
Schafzahl (Meixner, Altmann) – 02:51	2–0
	2–1	09:17 – Aurard (Jure)
	2–2	26:15 – Gendarme (Baudrit) (PP)
	2–3	59:55 – Passard (Locatelli) (PP)

14 min
Penalties
14 min
22
Shots
25

13 April 2018; 12:30	Denmark	5–6 (3–3, 1–2, 1–1)	Austria	Vaujany Arena, Vaujany; Attendance: 92

Game reference

Emma-Sofie Nordström
Cassandra Repstock-Romme
Goalies
Jessica Ekrt
Referee:
(Germany) Ramona Weiss
Linesmen:
(Sweden) Jessica Lundgren
(France) Sueva Torribio

	0–1	01:17 – Hanser (Beiter-Schwärzler, Wittich)
Jakobsen (Glud, N. Jensen) – 02:37	1–1
N. Jensen (Jakobsen, Østergaard) (PP) – 09:27	2–1
	2–2	14:00 – Altmann (Fazokas) (PP)
N. Jensen (Jakobsen, Glud) – 15:27	3–2
	3–3	19:45 – Volgger (Hummel)
N. Jensen (Andersen, Jakobsen) – 24:05	4–3
	4–4	27:48 – Beiter-Schwärzler (Altmann, Meixner)
	4–5	37:52 – Meixner (Altmann, Hanser)
	4–6	43:26 – Beiter-Schwärzler (Altmann, Meixner)
Gregersen (Persson, Frandsen) (PP, EA) – 58:49	5–6

10 min
Penalties
10 min
32
Shots
35

13 April 2018; 16:00	Norway	1–0 (0–0, 1–0, 0–0)	Slovakia	Vaujany Arena, Vaujany; Attendance: 268

Game reference
Ena Nystrøm	Goalies	Romana Kiapešová	Referee: (Canada) Meghan MacTavish; Linesmen: (France) Anne Boniface (Finland) Jenni Jaatinen
Fischer (Aarke, Morset) – 25:16 / 1–0			Referee: (Canada) Meghan MacTavish; Linesmen: (France) Anne Boniface (Finland) Jenni Jaatinen
6 min	Penalties	4 min	Referee: (Canada) Meghan MacTavish; Linesmen: (France) Anne Boniface (Finland) Jenni Jaatinen
32	Shots	28	Referee: (Canada) Meghan MacTavish; Linesmen: (France) Anne Boniface (Finland) Jenni Jaatinen

13 April 2018; 19:30	Hungary	1–2 (1–1, 0–1, 0–0)	France	Vaujany Arena, Vaujany; Attendance: 800

Game reference

Anikó Németh
Goalies
Caroline Baldin
Referee:
(Finland) Henna Åberg
Linesmen:
(Slovakia) Michaela Kúdeľová
(United States) Sara Strong

	0–1	15:10 – Duvin (Allemoz, Aurard) (PP)
Huszák (T. Horváth, Tóth) (PP) – 18:45	1–1
	1–2	29:34 – Duvin (Escudero)

6 min
Penalties
4 min
28
Shots
27

14 April 2018; 12:30	Austria	3–0 (0–0, 2–0, 1–0)	Norway	Vaujany Arena, Vaujany; Attendance: 102

Game reference

Jessica Ekrt
Goalies
Ena Nystrøm
Referee:
(Finland) Henna Åberg
Linesmen:
(France) Anne Boniface
(Slovakia) Michaela Kúdeľová

Grascher (Volgger, Heuberger) – 31:29	1–0
Hanser (Weber, Matzka) – 31:49	2–0
Volgger (Grascher) – 48:38	3–0

0 min
Penalties
6 min
50
Shots
21

14 April 2018; 16:00	Denmark	0–3 (0–1, 0–2, 0–0)	Hungary	Vaujany Arena, Vaujany; Attendance: 148

Game reference

Cassandra Repstock-Romme
Goalies
Anikó Németh
Referee:
(Canada) Meghan MacTavish
Linesmen:
(Canada) Stéphanie Gagnon
(Finland) Jenni Jaatinen

0–1	16:59 – Kiss (Gasparics)
0–2	27:11 – Gasparics (Pintér)
0–3	35:35 – Huszák (Mayer)

6 min
Penalties
6 min
28
Shots
44

14 April 2018; 19:30	France	7–1 (3–0, 4–1, 0–0)	Slovakia	Vaujany Arena, Vaujany; Attendance: 800

Game reference

Caroline Lambert
Goalies
Romana Kiapešová
Adriana Štefanková
Referee:
(United States) Kristine Langley
Linesmen:
(Sweden) Jessica Lundgren
(United States) Sara Strong

Aurard (Villiot, Escudero) – 03:37	1–0
Rozier (Villiot) – 05:15	2–0
Desvignes (Villiot) – 07:57	3–0
Aurard (Escudero, Duvin) – 27:02	4–0
	4–1	31:05 – Rumanová (Korenková, L. Ištocyová)
Cuasnet (Duvin) (SH) – 32:54	5–1
Baudrit (Allemoz) (SH) – 33:23	6–1
Baudrit (Allemoz) (SH) – 34:36	7–1

33 min
Penalties
14 min
36
Shots
30

=== Awards and statistics ===
==== Awards ====
- Best players selected by the directorate:
  - Best Goalkeeper: (Norway) Ena Nystrøm
  - Best Defenseman: (France) Gwendoline Gendarme
  - Best Forward: (Hungary) Fanni Gasparics

Source: IIHF.com

==== Scoring leaders ====
List shows the top skaters sorted by points, then goals.

Player	GP	G	A	Pts	+/−	PIM	POS
(Hungary) Fanni Gasparics	5	6	4	10	+1	0	F
(Denmark) Josefine Jakobsen	5	2	8	10	+3	10	F
(Denmark) Silke Glud	5	6	3	9	+5	0	F
(Austria) Denise Altmann	5	4	5	9	+4	14	F
(Denmark) Nicoline Jensen	5	3	6	9	+4	8	F
(Hungary) Alexandra Huszák	5	6	2	8	+3	4	F
(Austria) Anna Meixner	5	2	5	7	+2	14	F
(Hungary) Tifani Horváth	5	1	6	7	+4	2	F
(Hungary) Averi Nooren	5	3	3	6	+3	0	F
(France) Chloé Aurard	5	4	1	5	+4	12	F

GP = Games played; G = Goals; A = Assists; Pts = Points; +/− = Plus/minus; PIM = Penalties in minutes; POS = Position
Source: IIHF.com

==== Leading goaltenders ====
Only the top five goaltenders, based on save percentage, who have played at least 40% of their team's minutes, are included in this list.

Player	TOI	GA	GAA	SA	Sv%	SO
(Norway) Ena Nystrøm	179:22	4	1.34	104	96.15	1
(France) Caroline Baldin	238:35	7	1.76	103	93.20	0
(Austria) Theresa Hornich	180:00	7	2.33	74	90.54	1
(Denmark) Cassandra Repstock-Romme	137:49	7	3.05	74	90.45	0
(Hungary) Anikó Németh	298:48	13	2.61	130	90.00	1

TOI = Time on Ice (minutes:seconds); SA = Shots against; GA = Goals against; GAA = Goals against average; Sv% = Save percentage; SO = Shutouts
Source: IIHF.com

== Division I Group B ==
2018 IIHF Women's World Championship Division I B

Tournament details
- Host country: Italy
- City: Asiago
- Venue: 1 (in 1 host city)
- Dates: 8–14 April 2018
- Teams: 6

Tournament statistics
- Games played: 15
- Goals scored: 64 (4.27 per game)
- Attendance: 2,275 (152 per game)
- Scoring leader: (Italy) Eleonora Dalprà (9 points)

Official website
- www.iihf.com

The Division I Group B tournament was played in Asiago, Italy, from 8 to 14 April 2018.

=== Participating teams ===
Team	Qualification
Kazakhstan	Placed 2nd in Division I B last year.
Latvia	Placed 3rd in Division I B last year.
China	Placed 4th in Division I B last year.
Italy	Hosts; placed 5th in Division I B last year.
Poland	Placed 6th in Division I B last year.
South Korea	Placed 1st in Division II A last year and were promoted.

=== Match officials ===
4 referees and 7 linesmen were selected for the tournament.

Referees

- (Canada) Vanessa Morin
- (Finland) Henna-Maria Koivuluoma
- (Czech Republic) Radka Růžičková
- (United States) Laura White

Linesmen

- (Switzerland) Tanja Cadonau
- (Slovakia) Magdaléna Čerhitová
- (Norway) Stephanie Cole
- (Italy) Mirjam Gruber
- (United Kingdom) Amy Lack
- (Netherlands) Senovwa Mollen
- (United States) Kristin Moore

=== Final standings ===
Pos	Team	Pld	W	OTW	OTL	L	GF	GA	GD	Pts	Promotion
1	Italy (H)	5	4	0	0	1	14	6	+8	12	Promoted to the 2019 Division I A
2	South Korea	5	3	1	0	1	20	8	+12	11	
3	Latvia	5	3	0	0	2	7	12	−5	9	
4	Kazakhstan	5	2	0	1	2	9	10	−1	7	
5	China	5	2	0	0	3	7	7	0	6	
6	Poland	5	0	0	0	5	7	21	−14	0	

Source: IIHF
Rules for classification: 1) points; 2) head-to-head points; 3) head-to-head goal difference; 4) head-to-head number of goals scored; 5) result against closest best-ranked team outside tied teams; 6) result against second-best-ranked team outside tied teams; 7) seeding before tournament.
(H) Host

=== Match results ===
All times are local (Central European Summer Time – UTC+2).

8 April 2018; 13:30	South Korea	2–1 OT (0–0, 1–0, 0–1) (OT 1–0)	Kazakhstan	Pala Hodegart, Asiago; Attendance: 150

Game reference

Shin So-jung
Goalies
Arina Shyokolova
Referee:
(Finland) Henna-Maria Koivuluoma
Linesmen:
(Italy) Mirjam Gruber
(United Kingdom) Amy Lack

Kim S. (Griffin) (PP) – 31:09	1–0
	1–1	59:41 – Fux
Brandt (Lee E.) – 64:54	2–1

12 min
Penalties
6 min
32
Shots
18

8 April 2018; 17:00	Poland	0–4 (0–0, 0–2, 0–2)	China	Pala Hodegart, Asiago; Attendance: 300

Game reference

Martyna Sass
Goalies
Wang Yuqing
Referee:
(United States) Laura White
Linesmen:
(Switzerland) Tanja Cadonau
(Norway) Stephanie Cole

0–1	28:59 – Wen (Hou, Zhu)
0–2	32:37 – Fang (Yu, He)
0–3	42:02 – Yu (Liu, Pi)
0–4	47:55 – Fang (Hou, Kong)

4 min
Penalties
2 min
17
Shots
41

8 April 2018; 20:30	Italy	5–1 (1–0, 3–0, 1–1)	Latvia	Pala Hodegart, Asiago; Attendance: 150

Game reference

Giulia Mazzocchi
Goalies
Kristiāna Apsīte
Referee:
(Czech Republic) Radka Růžičková
Linesmen:
(Slovakia) Magdaléna Čerhitová
(Netherlands) Senovwa Mollen

Saletta (Dalprà) – 06:25	1–0
De Rocco (SH) – 20:36	2–0
De la Forest de Divonne (De Rocco) – 30:32	3–0
Galtieri (Roccella, Campo Bagatin) – 37:16	4–0
De la Forest de Divonne (Saletta, Dalprà) – 43:21	5–0
	5–1	55:33 – Kubliņa (Lagzdiņa, Miljone)

8 min
Penalties
6 min
34
Shots
22

9 April 2018; 13:30	Latvia	2–1 (0–0, 1–0, 1–1)	Poland	Pala Hodegart, Asiago; Attendance: 60

Game reference

Kristiāna Apsīte
Goalies
Martyna Sass
Referee:
(United States) Laura White
Linesmen:
(Slovakia) Magdaléna Čerhitová
(Italy) Mirjam Gruber

Ozmena (Miljone) (PP2) – 38:43	1–0
	1–1	48:46 – Tomczok (Sopata)
Yip-Chuck (Lagzdiņa) – 56:45	2–1

12 min
Penalties
16 min
30
Shots
34

9 April 2018; 17:00	China	2–1 (0–0, 2–1, 0–0)	South Korea	Pala Hodegart, Asiago; Attendance: 90

Game reference

Wang Yuqing
Goalies
Shin So-jung
Referee:
(Canada) Vanessa Morin
Linesmen:
(United Kingdom) Amy Lack
(United States) Kristin Moore

Hou (Pi) – 26:25	1–0
	1–1	29:08 – Choi Ji. (Park J.)
Fang (Kong) – 39:27	2–1

6 min
Penalties
4 min
23
Shots
27

9 April 2018; 20:30	Kazakhstan	1–4 (0–0, 1–2, 0–2)	Italy	Pala Hodegart, Asiago; Attendance: 150

Game reference

Daria Dmitrieva
Arina Shyokolova
Goalies
Giulia Mazzocchi
Referee:
(Finland) Henna-Maria Koivuluoma
Linesmen:
(Switzerland) Tanja Cadonau
(Netherlands) Senovwa Mollen

Aldabergenova (Sviridova) – 27:31	1–0
	1–1	31:26 – Dalprà (Saletta)
	1–2	36:40 – Mattivi (Dalprà) (PP)
	1–3	41:31 – Carignano (Mistrotofolo)
	1–4	45:34 – Saletta (Dalprà, De la Forest de Divonne)

6 min
Penalties
10 min
29
Shots
25

11 April 2018; 13:30	Latvia	2–1 (0–0, 0–1, 2–0)	China	Pala Hodegart, Asiago; Attendance: 80

Game reference

Kristiāna Apsīte
Goalies
He Siye
Referee:
(Czech Republic) Radka Růžičková
Linesmen:
(Switzerland) Tanja Cadonau
(Italy) Mirjam Gruber

	0–1	20:51 – Hou (Zhu, Pi)
Miljone (Yip-Chuck) (PP) – 44:22	1–1
Miljone (Yip-Chuck) (PP) – 53:15	2–1

6 min
Penalties
10 min
15
Shots
30

11 April 2018; 17:00	Kazakhstan	4–3 (2–2, 2–1, 0–0)	Poland	Pala Hodegart, Asiago; Attendance: 75

Game reference

Daria Dmitrieva
Arina Shyokolova
Goalies
Agata Kosińska
Martyna Sass
Referee:
(Canada) Vanessa Morin
Linesmen:
(United Kingdom) Amy Lack
(Netherlands) Senovwa Mollen

Shegebayeva (Moldabai) – 01:34	1–0
	1–1	07:01 – Późniewska (Czaplik) (SH)
Aldabergenova (Koroleva) – 12:42	2–1
	2–2	19:44 – Czaplik (Późniewska)
	2–3	28:05 – Strzelecka (Wieczorek) (PP)
Moldabai (Tursynova) (PP) – 33:03	3–3
Fux (Shegebayeva, Moldabai) – 34:39	4–3

6 min
Penalties
6 min
32
Shots
25

11 April 2018; 20:30	South Korea	3–2 (1–1, 0–0, 2–1)	Italy	Pala Hodegart, Asiago; Attendance: 150

Game reference

Shin So-jung
Goalies
Giulia Mazzocchi
Referee:
(United States) Laura White
Linesmen:
(Norway) Stephanie Cole
(United States) Kristin Moore

Park J. (Kim S.) – 12:33	1–0
	1–1	14:21 – Mattivi (Dalprà) (PP2)
	1–2	42:02 – Dalprà (SH)
Park C. (Lee J., Kim S.) – 57:03	2–2
Park C. (Choi Ji., Han) – 58:11	3–2

18 min
Penalties
10 min
20
Shots
18

12 April 2018; 13:30	China	0–3 (0–0, 0–0, 0–3)	Kazakhstan	Pala Hodegart, Asiago; Attendance: 60

Game reference

Wang Yuqing
Goalies
Daria Dmitrieva
Referee:
(Canada) Vanessa Morin
Linesmen:
(Slovakia) Magdaléna Čerhitová
(United States) Kristin Moore

0–1	52:14 – Ryspek (Tukhtieva)
0–2	56:29 – Tukhtieva (Fux, Olzhabayeva)
0–3	59:27 – Ryspek (ENG)

2 min
Penalties
0 min
26
Shots
29

12 April 2018; 17:00	Latvia	1–5 (0–1, 0–2, 1–2)	South Korea	Pala Hodegart, Asiago; Attendance: 80

Game reference

Kristiāna Apsīte
Goalies
Shin So-jung
Han Do-hee
Referee:
(Finland) Henna-Maria Koivuluoma
Linesmen:
(Switzerland) Tanja Cadonau
(Netherlands) Senovwa Mollen

	0–1	05:53 – Park J. (Jo)
	0–2	20:53 – Im (Kim S., Park C.) (PP)
	0–3	33:00 – Kim H. (Lee J., Eom)
	0–4	50:25 – Park J.
Lagzdiņa (Žagare) – 54:26	1–4
	1–5	59:50 – Han S. (Park J., Eom) (PP)

6 min
Penalties
4 min
14
Shots
33

12 April 2018; 20:30	Italy	2–1 (1–1, 0–0, 1–0)	Poland	Pala Hodegart, Asiago; Attendance: 210

Game reference

Elisa Biondi
Goalies
Martyna Sass
Referee:
(Czech Republic) Radka Růžičková
Linesmen:
(Norway) Stephanie Cole
(United Kingdom) Amy Lack

Dalprà (De la Forest de Divonne) – 14:40	1–0
	1–1	19:22 – Późniewska (Wieczorek)
De la Forest de Divonne (Dalprà, Mattivi) (PP) – 40:45	2–1

10 min
Penalties
10 min
30
Shots
15

14 April 2018; 13:30	Poland	2–9 (0–3, 1–3, 1–3)	South Korea	Pala Hodegart, Asiago; Attendance: 80

Game reference

Martyna Sass
Agata Kosińska
Goalies
Shin So-jung
Han Do-hee
Referee:
(Czech Republic) Radka Růžičková
Linesmen:
(Italy) Mirjam Gruber
(United Kingdom) Amy Lack

	0–1	04:34 – Griffin (Kim S., Park C.) (PP)
	0–2	12:25 – Park Yo. (Choi Ji., Park J.)
	0–3	17:48 – Park Yo. (Im)
Wieczorek – 24:28	1–3
	1–4	31:02 – Cho (Jo)
	1–5	32:21 – Lee J.
	1–6	38:48 – Park Yo. (Choi Y. Han)
Łaskawska (Późniewska) – 51:02	2–6
	2–7	53:00 – Park Yo. (Kim H.)
	2–8	54:52 – Lee J. (Park Ye.)
	2–9	58:56 – Park J. (Park Ye., Han)

4 min
Penalties
4 min
21
Shots
43

14 April 2018; 17:00	Kazakhstan	0–1 (0–0, 0–1, 0–0)	Latvia	Pala Hodegart, Asiago; Attendance: 90

Game reference
Daria Dmitrieva	Goalies	Kristiāna Apsīte	Referee: (United States) Laura White; Linesmen: (Slovakia) Magdaléna Čerhitová (Norway) Stephanie Cole
0–1 / 27:26 – Ozmena (Lagzdiņa) (PP)			Referee: (United States) Laura White; Linesmen: (Slovakia) Magdaléna Čerhitová (Norway) Stephanie Cole
6 min	Penalties	29 min	Referee: (United States) Laura White; Linesmen: (Slovakia) Magdaléna Čerhitová (Norway) Stephanie Cole
36	Shots	20	Referee: (United States) Laura White; Linesmen: (Slovakia) Magdaléna Čerhitová (Norway) Stephanie Cole

14 April 2018; 20:30	China	0–1 (0–0, 0–1, 0–0)	Italy	Pala Hodegart, Asiago; Attendance: 550

Game reference
He Siye	Goalies	Giulia Mazzocchi	Referee: (Canada) Vanessa Morin; Linesmen: (Switzerland) Tanja Cadonau (United States) Kristin Moore
0–1 / 30:17 – De Rocco (Galtieri) (PP)			Referee: (Canada) Vanessa Morin; Linesmen: (Switzerland) Tanja Cadonau (United States) Kristin Moore
12 min	Penalties	4 min	Referee: (Canada) Vanessa Morin; Linesmen: (Switzerland) Tanja Cadonau (United States) Kristin Moore
21	Shots	21	Referee: (Canada) Vanessa Morin; Linesmen: (Switzerland) Tanja Cadonau (United States) Kristin Moore

=== Awards and statistics ===
==== Awards ====
- Best players selected by the directorate:
  - Best Goalkeeper: (Italy) Giulia Mazzocchi
  - Best Defenseman: (Italy) Nadia Mattivi
  - Best Forward: (South Korea) Park Jong-ah

Source: IIHF.com

==== Scoring leaders ====
List shows the top skaters sorted by points, then goals.

Player	GP	G	A	Pts	+/−	PIM	POS
(Italy) Eleonora Dalprà	5	3	6	9	+7	2	F
(South Korea) Park Jong-ah	5	4	3	7	+5	2	F
(South Korea) Park Yoon-jung	5	5	0	5	+5	2	F
(Italy) Anna de la Forest de Divonne	5	3	2	5	+1	6	F
(China) Hou Yue	5	2	2	4	+1	6	F
(South Korea) Lee Jing-yu	5	2	2	4	+3	2	F
(Latvia) Līga Miljone	5	2	2	4	−3	25	F
(Poland) Karolina Późniewska	5	2	2	4	0	2	F
(Italy) Carola Saletta	5	2	2	4	+5	4	F
(South Korea) Han Soo-jin	5	1	3	4	+7	0	F
(Latvia) Anna Katrīna Lagzdiņa	5	1	3	4	−3	0	F
(South Korea) Park Chae-lin	5	1	3	4	+3	2	D

GP = Games played; G = Goals; A = Assists; Pts = Points; +/− = Plus/minus; PIM = Penalties in minutes; POS = Position
Source: IIHF.com

==== Leading goaltenders ====
Only the top five goaltenders, based on save percentage, who have played at least 40% of their team's minutes, are included in this list.

Player	TOI	GA	GAA	SA	Sv%	SO
(Italy) Giulia Mazzocchi	239:37	5	1.25	93	94.62	1
(China) Wang Yuqing	296:51	6	1.21	108	94.44	1
(Latvia) Kristiāna Apsīte	300:00	12	2.40	167	92.81	1
(Kazakhstan) Daria Dmitrieva	252:42	8	1.90	110	92.73	1
(South Korea) Shin So-jung	284:44	7	1.48	88	92.05	0

TOI = Time on Ice (minutes:seconds); SA = Shots against; GA = Goals against; GAA = Goals against average; Sv% = Save percentage; SO = Shutouts
Source: IIHF.com
