= Jelena Grkovic =

Hungarian-Serbian ice hockey player

Jelena Grkovic Јелене Грковић / Jelena Grković
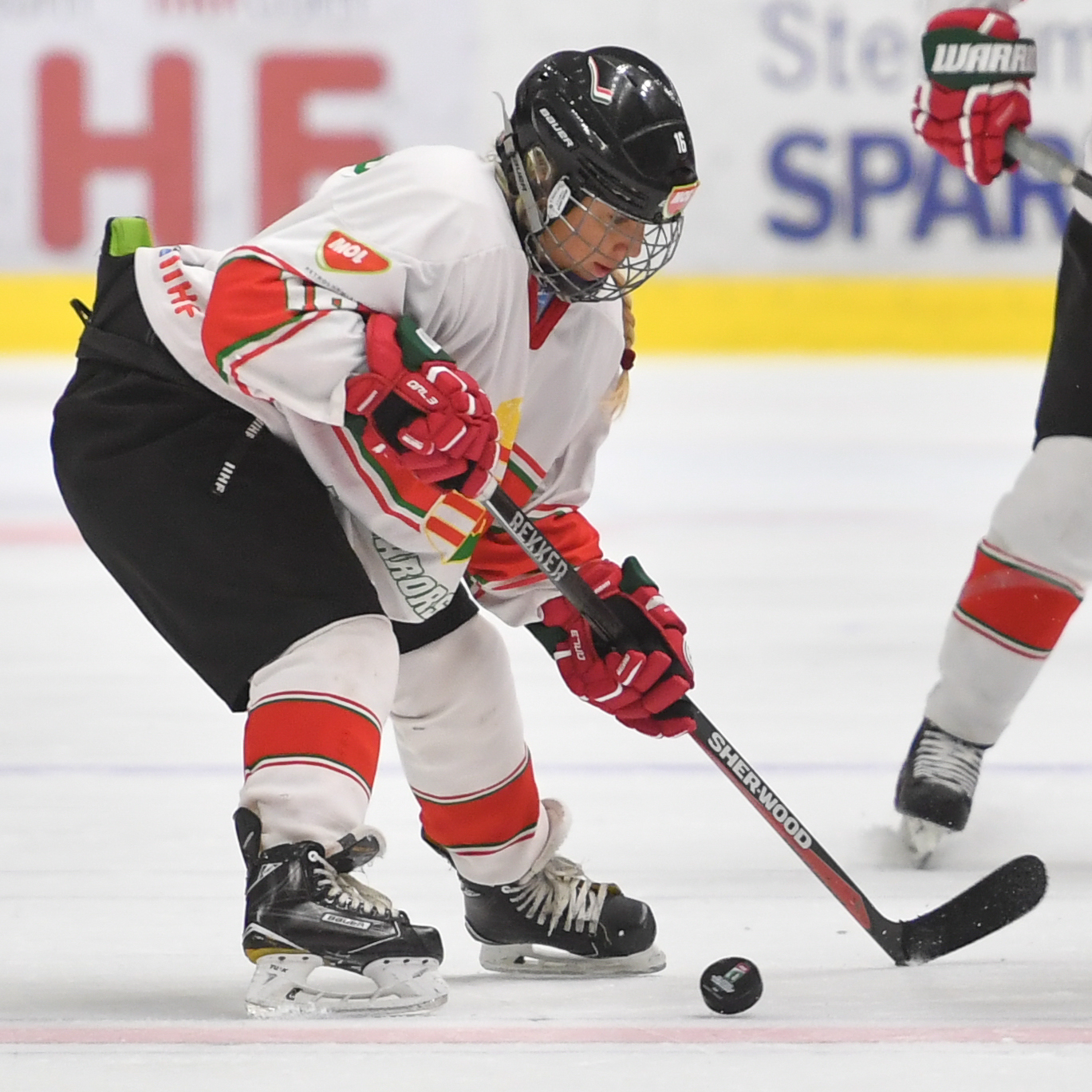
- Grkovic representing Hungary at the 2017 World Championship Division 1A
- Born: 30 August 1997 (age 29) Novi Sad, Serbia
- Height: 169 cm (5 ft 7 in)
- Weight: 61 kg (134 lb; 9 st 8 lb)
- Position: Defense
- Shoots: Left
- LNHHF team Former teams: S.A.D. Majadahonda; MAC Budapest; KMH Budapest
- National team: Hungary
- Playing career: 2012–present

Jelena Grkovic (Serbian Cyrillic: Јелене Грковић, Serbian: Jelena Grković; born 30 August 1997) is a Hungarian-Serbian ice hockey player and member of the Hungarian national ice hockey team, currently playing in the Liga Nacional de Hockey Hielo Femenino (LNHHF) with S.A.D. Majadahonda.

Grkovic represented Hungary at the 2021 IIHF Women's World Championship.

== Career statistics ==
=== International ===
Year	Team	Event	Result	GP	G	A	Pts	PIM
2014	Hungary U18	WW18	8th	5	0	0	0	0
2015	Hungary U18	WW18 D1	5th	5	3	0	3	6
2016	Hungary	WW D1B	1st	5	0	0	0	0
2016	Hungary	OGQ	DNQ	3	0	1	1	2
2017	Hungary	WW D1A	5th	5	0	0	0	2
2018	Hungary	WW D1A	3rd	5	1	0	1	4
2019	Hungary	WW D1A	1st	5	0	0	0	2
2021	Hungary	WW	9th	2	0	0	0	0
Junior totals				10	3	0	3	6
Senior totals				22	1	0	1	8
