= Eva Nystrom =

Eva Nystrom may refer to:

- Eva Nyström
- Ena Nystrøm
