= HC Porto =

Portuguese ice hockey team

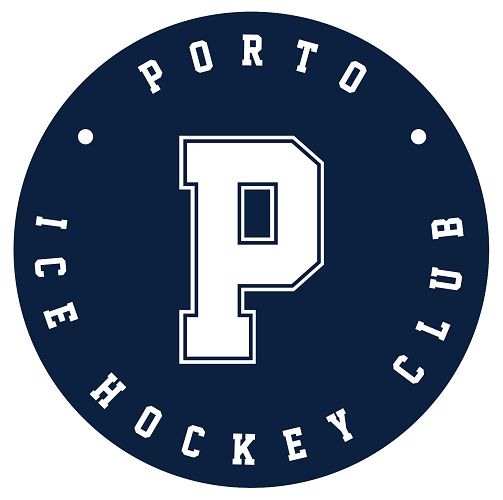
- City: Porto, Portugal
- League: Liga Ibérica
- Founded: 2023
- Home arena: Trofa Ice Arena (600 seats)
- Colours: Navy, white
- Head coach: Jim Aldred
- Captain: Edgars Svencis
- Website: www.portohc.com

Franchise history
- 2023–present: H.C. Porto

Ice Hockey Club Porto, or HC Porto, is a Portuguese ice hockey team based in Porto. Established in 2023, they became the first Portuguese team to join the Spanish Liga Nacional de Hockey Hielo (LNHH), and became founding members of the Portuguese-Spanish Liga Ibérica in 2024.

== History ==
Ice Hockey Club Porto was established in July 2023 by Portugal national ice hockey team head coach Jim Aldred, to develop Portuguese hockey, and raise its profile in the country.

The team became the first Portuguese member of the Liga Nacional de Hockey Hielo (LNHH) in Spain after an agreement made between the Portuguese Winter Sports Federation, Royal Spanish Winter Sports Federation and the International Ice Hockey Federation (IIHF). League regulations Portuguese team was ineligible to qualify for the Spanish national championship, but only play regular season games. Lacking a full-sized ice rink in Portugal, the team played its home games at rinks in Spain.

One of the team's first player signings was former Philadelphia Flyers defenceman Oskars Bārtulis. HC Porto played its first competitive game LNHH on 19 September, losing 8–1 to Majadahonda HC, with Janis Berzins scoring Porto's first goal. During the 2023–24 season, HC Porto won seven of its 14 games, and placed fifth of eight teams.

In March 2024, HC Porto won the inaugural Portugal national 3-on-3 hockey tournament, placing first in a four-team round robin with 10 points, ahead of the Vikings, Luso Lynx Hockey, and Ice Clube da Covilhã.

On 13 September 2024, HC Porto joined the newly created Liga Ibérica de Hóquei no Gelo. The league was established through a partnership between the Portuguese and Spanish Winter Sport Federations, and included the six leading Spanish teams from the LNHH. HC Porto's first game of the season was delayed when the players' equipment did not arrive on the same flight as them. Their opponent, SAD Majadahonda, loaned their away jerseys and extra equipment to play the game, which HC Porto lost by a 5–1 score. When the lost equipment arrived, the next day's game was played resulting in 2–1 victory for HC Porto. HC Porto won nine of their 18 games in the 2024–25 season, placing fourth of seven teams.

HC Porto won the 2024–25 Portugal national 3-on-3 hockey tournament, undefeated in the regular season and playoffs.

An Olympic-sized ice rink with a capacity of 600 seats, is scheduled to open in Trofa in 2025, provide a training facility, and allowing the Portugal national ice hockey team to host IIHF events.
