= Frederik Andersen =

Danish ice hockey player (born 1989)

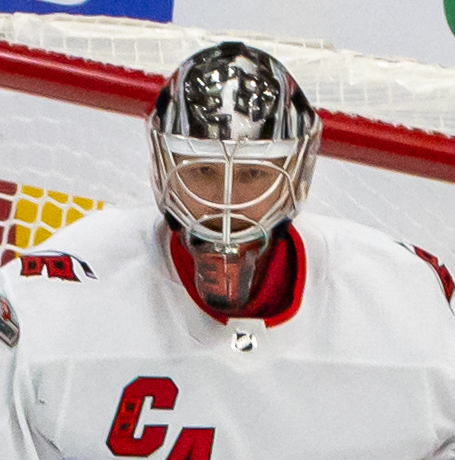
- Andersen with the Carolina Hurricanes in 2022
- Born: 2 October 1989 (age 37) Herning, Denmark
- Height: 6 ft 4 in (193 cm)
- Weight: 229 lb (104 kg; 16 st 5 lb)
- Position: Goaltender
- Catches: Left
- NHL team Former teams: Edmonton Oilers; Herning Blue Fox; Frederikshavn White Hawks; Frölunda HC; Anaheim Ducks; Toronto Maple Leafs; Carolina Hurricanes
- National team: Denmark
- NHL draft: 187th overall, 2010; Carolina Hurricanes; 87th overall, 2012; Anaheim Ducks
- Playing career: 2008–present

Frederik Andersen (born 2 October 1989) is a Danish professional ice hockey player who is a goaltender for the Edmonton Oilers of the National Hockey League (NHL). He previously played for the Anaheim Ducks, Toronto Maple Leafs, and Carolina Hurricanes.

Representing Denmark, Andersen competed in the 2010 World Championship. He was selected by the Hurricanes in the seventh round, 187th overall, of the 2010 NHL entry draft. Unable to come to terms with the Hurricanes, Andersen later re-entered the draft and was selected in the third round of the 2012 NHL entry draft, 87th overall. Before joining the Ducks, Andersen played in the Superisligaen and the Elitserien, the top leagues in Denmark and Sweden, respectively. Andersen is the first Danish-born goaltender to play in the NHL. Andersen won the Stanley Cup with the Hurricanes in 2026.

== Playing career ==
=== Europe ===
From 2009 to 2011, Andersen played for the Frederikshavn White Hawks of the Superisligaen, Denmark's top professional ice hockey league. On 13 March 2010, while playing for the White Hawks, Andersen scored an empty net goal in the fourth quarterfinal match against Rødovre Mighty Bulls. He nearly scored two nights before in the third match, but missed.

Andersen played for one season (2011–12) with Frölunda HC of the Elitserien, the highest-level professional league in Sweden. He set an Elitserien regular-season club record with eight shutouts in 2011–12, surpassing Henrik Lundqvist's seven shutouts from the 2003–04 season. In addition to his shutouts, Andersen also led the Elitserien in goals against average (GAA) and save percentage and received a nomination for the Elitserien Rookie of the Year award.

=== NHL ===
==== Anaheim Ducks (2013–2016) ====
On 20 October 2013, shortly into the 2013–14 season, Andersen made his NHL debut for the Anaheim Ducks, replacing starting goaltender Jonas Hiller to start the second period. Taking over with a 3–1 Ducks deficit, he logged two shutout periods, earning him his first NHL win, a 6–3 victory over the Dallas Stars. With his debut, Andersen became the first Danish-born goaltender in NHL history. Following the trade of then-backup goaltender Viktor Fasth to the Edmonton Oilers on 4 March 2014, Andersen became the team's new full-time backup goaltender to Hiller after spending the majority of the season playing for Anaheim's American Hockey League (AHL) affiliate, the Norfolk Admirals.

On 16 April 2014, Andersen won his Stanley Cup playoff debut as Anaheim defeated the Dallas Stars 4–3 in Game 1 of the Western Conference quarterfinals. Andersen made 32 saves, giving up three goals. He split time with both Jonas Hiller and John Gibson during the Ducks' run in the 2014 playoffs, which ultimately ended in the Western Conference semifinals against the Los Angeles Kings, the eventual Stanley Cup champions.

The following year, in 2014–15, with Hiller departed via free agency to the Calgary Flames, Andersen and Gibson became the Ducks' goaltending duo. As the season progressed, however, Andersen assumed the starter's role through both his impressive goaltending play and injuries to Gibson that kept the latter out of the lineup. After recording his 30th win of the season on 3 March 2015, Andersen tied an NHL record as the fastest goaltender in history to reach 50 career wins. He reached the milestone in just 68 career games, tying the record set by the Montreal Canadiens' Bill Durnan on 16 December 1944. In the 2015 Stanley Cup playoffs, Andersen led the Ducks to the Western Conference finals with his strong play - the Ducks only lost one game in the first two rounds. After taking a 3–2 series lead, the Ducks lost the final two games of the series, including game 7 on home ice to The Chicago Blackhawks. This marked the third straight season the Ducks had lost a series in Game 7 at home after leading the series three games to two. Andersen allowed four or more goals in each of the final four games of the series – the Ducks lost three of those four games and allowed 19 goals over that span.

==== Toronto Maple Leafs (2016–2021) ====
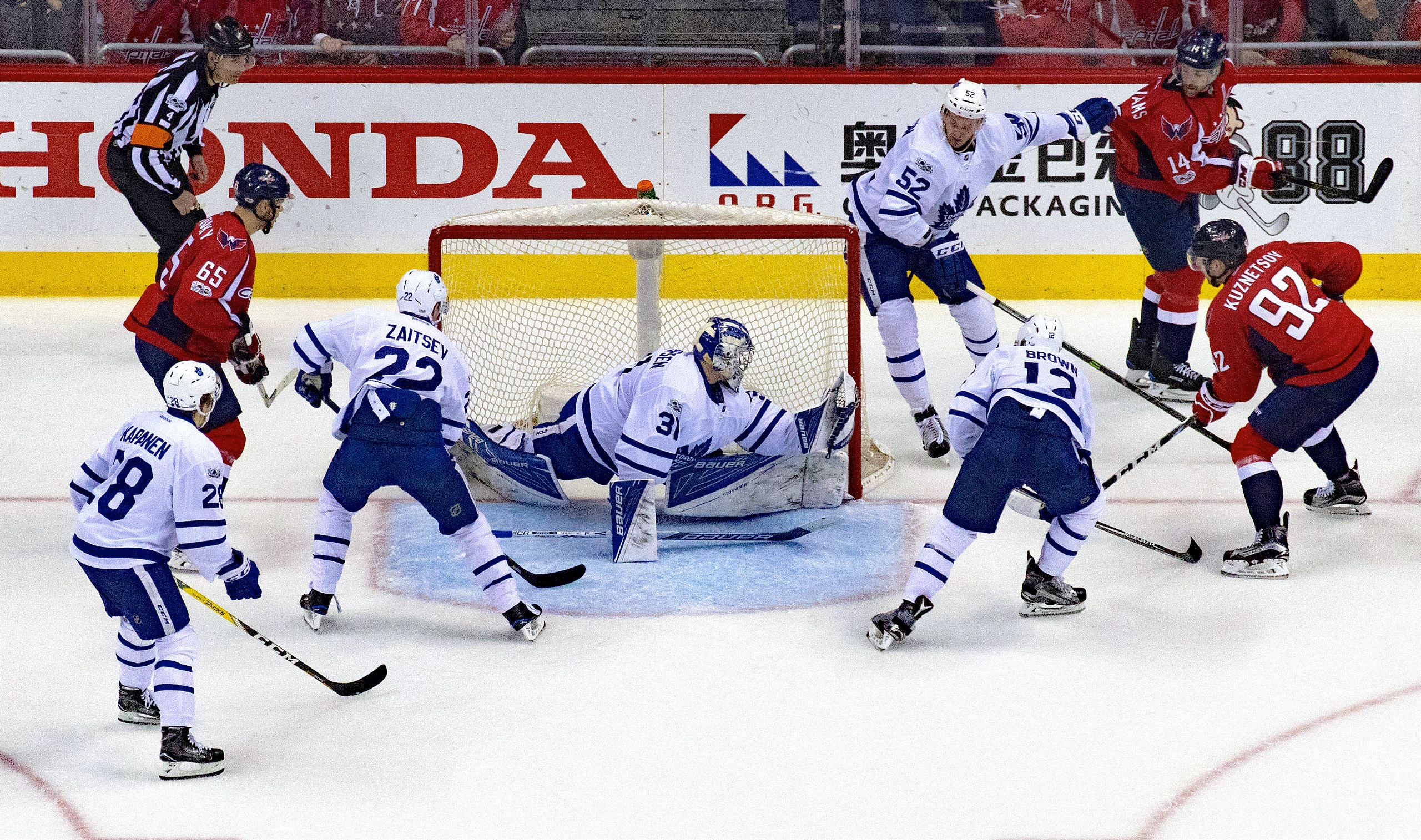
Andersen makes a save against the Washington Capitals during the 2017 Stanley Cup playoffs. He recorded a 2.68 GAA during the playoff series.

On 20 June 2016, Andersen was traded to the Toronto Maple Leafs for the 30th overall pick (previously acquired from the Pittsburgh Penguins in the Phil Kessel trade) in the 2016 NHL entry draft (used to select Sam Steel) and a second-round pick in the 2017 NHL entry draft (middle of Toronto, San Jose, or Ottawa picks – used to select Maxime Comtois). On the same day, the Leafs and Frederik Andersen agreed to terms on a five-year contract extension. After a slow start with the Leafs, Andersen found his game; he went 33–16–14 on the season with a 2.67 GAA, a .918 save percentage, and four shutouts, leading the Leafs to a playoff berth for the first time since the 2012–13 NHL season.

During the 2017–18 season, Andersen bested his career-high in wins on 28 March 2018, with his 36th win of the season in a game against the Florida Panthers. On the same day, he helped the Leafs set a new franchise record of 27 wins on home ice after beating the Panthers 4–3. In the following game on 30 March 2018, against the New York Islanders, Andersen recorded his 37th win of the season, tying the single-season record for most wins by a Leafs goalie. On 7 April 2018, the last game of the Leafs' regular season, Andersen passed the Leafs all-time wins record with a 4–2 victory over the Montreal Canadiens. Andersen helped the Leafs qualify for the 2018 Stanley Cup playoffs, where they would fall to the Boston Bruins in seven games.

He recorded a 36–16–7 record during the 2018–19 NHL season, helping the Maple Leafs advance to their third consecutive playoff berth, but they were once again defeated in the first round by the Boston Bruins in seven games. On 14 December 2019, Andersen earned his 200th win in his 344th game against the Edmonton Oilers.

==== Carolina Hurricanes (2021–2026) ====
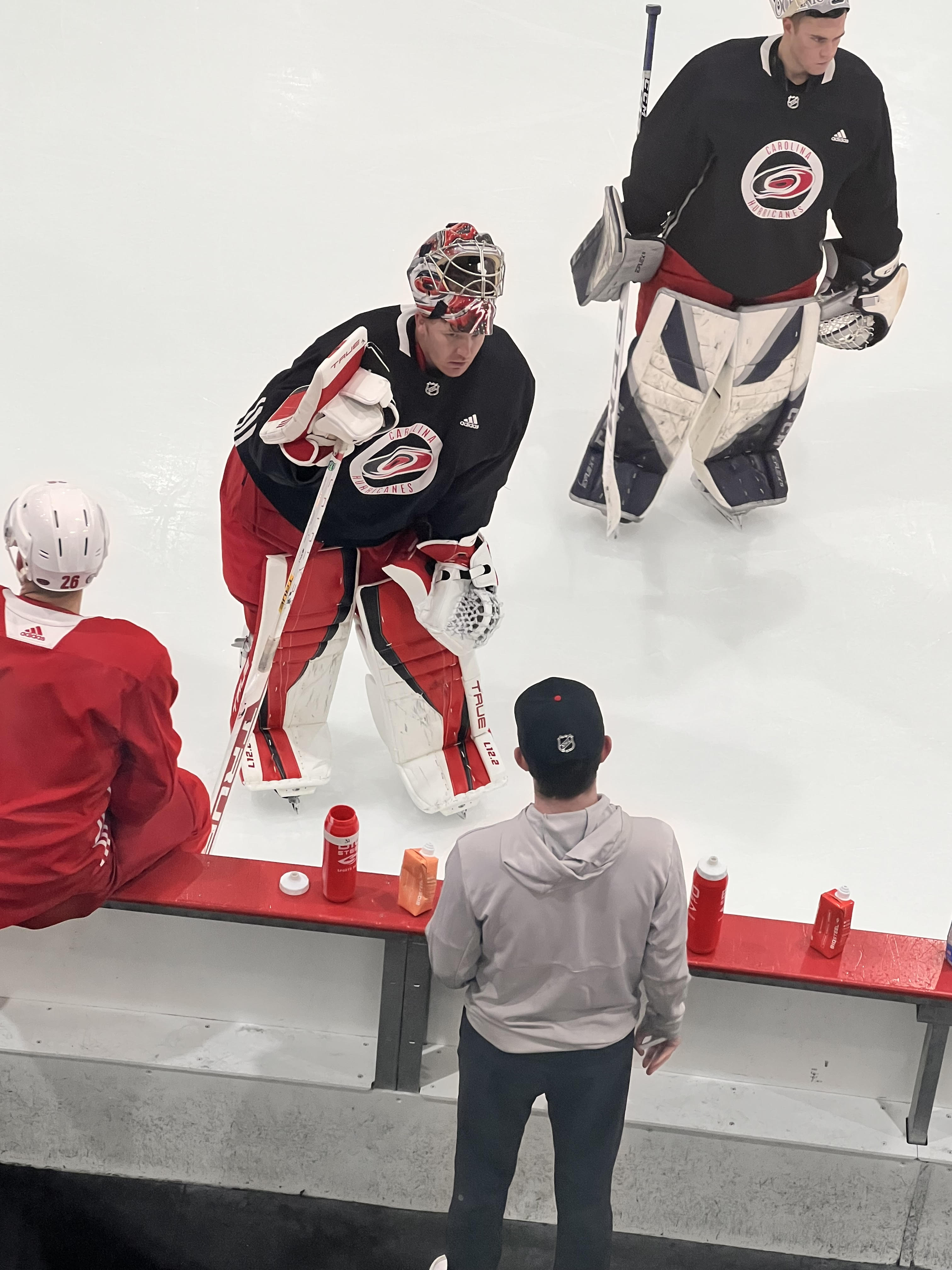
Andersen takes a break while practicing with the Hurricanes

After his five-year tenure with the Maple Leafs, Andersen left the club as a free agent. On 28 July 2021, he signed a two-year, $9 million contract with the Carolina Hurricanes. On 3 November, after a 6–3 win against the Chicago Blackhawks, Andersen became the first goaltender in franchise history to go 8–0–0 to start a season with a new team.

On 12 January 2022, Andersen was named to play in the 2022 NHL All-Star Game along with Sebastian Aho. On 5 February, Andersen, who played the first half of the All-Star Game in both games against the Atlantic and Pacific, helped the Metropolitan Division win the contest. On 16 April, Andersen suffered an injury that involved him getting helped off the ice in the last few minutes of the game. The team ended up losing 7–4 to the Colorado Avalanche. He was not able to start games in the playoffs, with Antti Raanta and Pyotr Kochetkov taking the net. Andersen and Raanta received the William M. Jennings Trophy as the goaltenders of the team that allowed the fewest goals during the regular season.

On 1 July 2023, Andersen signed a two-year, $6.8 million contract extension.

On 6 November 2023, the Hurricanes announced that Andersen would be out indefinitely to address a blood clotting issue that had been discovered during medical testing. Andersen returned on 7 March 2024, making 24 saves in a 4–1 win against the Montreal Canadiens. On 7 April, he recorded his 294th win in his 494th NHL game and surpassed Braden Holtby (293 wins in 500 games) for the most wins by a goaltender in their first 500 career games. Andersen finished the regular season with a 13–2–0 record. He was voted a finalist for the Bill Masterton Memorial Trophy, awarded by the Professional Hockey Writers' Association to the player who "best exemplifies the qualities of perseverance, sportsmanship and dedication to hockey."

On 31 October 2024, the Hurricanes announced that Andersen would be out "week-to-week" with a lower-body injury. He had only played in four games to start the season going 3-1 with a 0.941 save percentage, second best in the league in that span, and a league leading 1.48 goals against average. On 21 November 2024, the Hurricanes announced Andersen would undergo knee surgery and would miss 8–12 weeks.

Andersen returned and played in his 500th NHL game on 20 January 2025 making 22 saves in his 299th career win 4-3 in OT against the Blackhawks. He was the 84th goaltender and first Danish goaltender in NHL history to reach the 500 game benchmark. He earned his 300th career victory three days later in a 7-4 victory against the Columbus Blue Jackets.

On 3 May 2025, Andersen signed a one-year, $2.75 million contract extension.

During the 2025–26 season, Andersen helped the Hurricanes win the Stanley Cup, recording three shutouts through the first three rounds and posted a .910 save percentage, 1.89 goals against average and a 13–2–0 record in 16 games. He was also the first Danish-born goaltender to win the Stanley Cup. He and teammate Nikolaj Ehlers were together the second and third Danes to win a Stanley Cup title, after only Lars Eller.

==== Edmonton Oilers (2026–present) ====
On 1 July 2026, Andersen signed a one-year, $2.8 million contract with the Edmonton Oilers. Andersen later suffered an injury during an off-season training session, causing him to miss training camp.

== International play ==
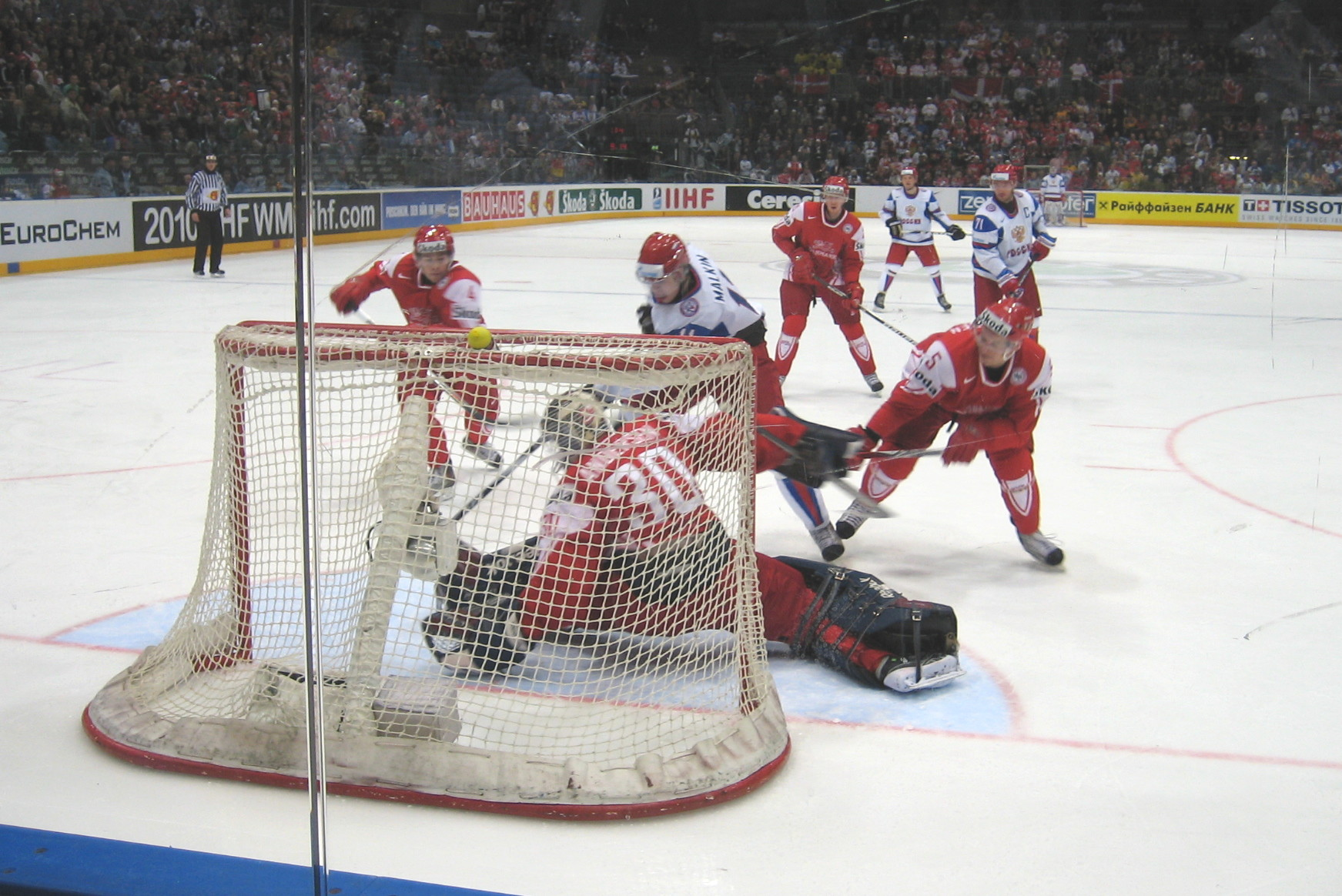
Andersen with the Danish national team during the 2010 World Championship.

Andersen was a member of Denmark's national team that competed at the 2010 World Championship.

Andersen also played in and won all three games of the Ice hockey at the 2026 Winter Olympics – Men's qualification for Denmark. He stopped 60 of 64 shots over the three games.

== Personal life ==
Andersen comes from a family of ice hockey players. His father, Ernst, played 17 seasons as a goaltender in the Metal Ligaen (Superisligaen). He is the goaltending coach for the men's national team and for Herning Blue Fox of the Metal Ligaen. Andersen's mother and uncles also played ice hockey in Denmark. His sister, Amalie, plays defense for the Danish women's national team and played in the Premier Hockey Federation (PHF). His brother, Sebastian, is also a defenceman and represented Denmark in the under-18 and junior competitions. His cousin, Emma-Sofie Nordstrøm, is also a professional goaltender. His brother, Valdemar, currently plays college hockey at the University of Wisconsin–River Falls.

During the start of the COVID-19 pandemic and pause to the NHL season in 2020, Andersen lived with then Toronto Maple Leafs teammate Auston Matthews, in Matthews' hometown, Scottsdale, Arizona.

Andersen has cited a visit to observe Navy SEAL training as a formative influence on his mental approach to goaltending, describing the experience as teaching him to be comfortable being uncomfortable.

== Career statistics ==
=== Regular season and playoffs ===
Bold indicates led league

			Regular season									Playoffs
Season	Team	League	GP	W	L	OTL	MIN	GA	SO	GAA	SV%	GP	W	L	MIN	GA	SO	GAA	SV%
2008–09	Herning Blue Fox	DEN	22	—	—	—	1,178	44	0	2.45	.922	—	—	—	—	—	—	—	—
2009–10	Frederikshavn White Hawks	DEN	30	—	—	—	1,753	64	0	2.19	.932	10	—	—	—	—	—	2.86	.925
2010–11	Frederikshavn White Hawks	DEN	35	—	—	—	—	—	—	2.49	.920	11	—	—	—	—	—	1.98	.942
2011–12	Frölunda HC	SHL	39	20	12	6	2,332	63	8	1.62	.943	6	2	4	379	17	0	2.69	.911
2012–13	Norfolk Admirals	AHL	47	24	18	1	2,685	98	4	2.19	.929	—	—	—	—	—	—	—	—
2013–14	Norfolk Admirals	AHL	4	3	1	0	245	8	1	1.96	.939	—	—	—	—	—	—	—	—
2013–14	Anaheim Ducks	NHL	28	20	5	0	1,569	60	0	2.29	.923	7	3	2	368	19	0	3.10	.899
2014–15	Anaheim Ducks	NHL	54	35	12	5	3,106	123	3	2.38	.914	16	11	5	1,050	41	1	2.34	.913
2015–16	Anaheim Ducks	NHL	43	22	9	4	2,286	88	3	2.30	.919	5	3	2	297	7	1	1.41	.947
2016–17	Toronto Maple Leafs	NHL	66	33	16	14	3,800	169	4	2.67	.918	6	2	4	403	18	0	2.68	.915
2017–18	Toronto Maple Leafs	NHL	66	38	21	5	3,889	182	5	2.81	.918	7	3	3	368	23	0	3.76	.896
2018–19	Toronto Maple Leafs	NHL	60	36	16	7	3,510	162	1	2.77	.917	7	3	4	414	19	0	2.75	.922
2019–20	Toronto Maple Leafs	NHL	52	29	13	7	3,007	143	3	2.85	.909	5	2	3	326	10	1	1.84	.936
2020–21	Toronto Maple Leafs	NHL	24	13	8	3	1,420	70	0	2.96	.895	—	—	—	—	—	—	—	—
2021–22	Carolina Hurricanes	NHL	52	35	14	3	3,071	111	4	2.17	.922	—	—	—	—	—	—	—	—
2022–23	Carolina Hurricanes	NHL	34	21	11	1	1,985	82	1	2.48	.903	9	5	3	591	18	0	**1.83**	.927
2023–24	Carolina Hurricanes	NHL	16	13	2	0	913	28	3	1.84	.932	10	6	4	642	28	0	2.62	.895
2024–25	Carolina Hurricanes	NHL	22	13	8	1	1,320	55	1	2.50	.899	13	8	5	743	25	2	2.02	.906
2025–26	Carolina Hurricanes	NHL	35	16	14	5	2,102	107	0	3.05	.874	16	13	2	1,014	32	3	1.89	.910
NHL totals			552	324	149	58	31,987	1,380	28	2.59	.913	101	59	37	6,215	240	8	2.32	.913

=== International ===
Year	Team	Event	GP	W	L	T	MIN	GA	SO	GAA	SV%
2006	Denmark	U18 D1	5	—	—	—	—	—	—	2.57	.908
2007	Denmark	U18 D1	4	—	—	—	—	—	0	1.25	.937
2008	Denmark	WJC	4	0	4	0	214	20	0	5.61	.854
2009	Denmark	WJC-D1	5	4	1	0	299	10	1	2.01	.899
2010	Denmark	WC	2	1	1	0	120	7	0	3.50	.899
2011	Denmark	WC	4	0	2	0	246	14	0	3.41	.910
2012	Denmark	WC	6	1	5	0	359	20	1	3.34	.888
2013	Denmark	OGQ	2	1	1	0	119	2	1	1.01	.960
2016	Denmark	OGQ	2	0	2	0	113	6	0	3.18	.854
2018	Denmark	WC	6	4	2	0	363	10	1	1.65	.943
2024	Denmark	OGQ	3	3	0	0	184	4	0	1.31	.938
2026	Denmark	OG	3	1	2	0	175	8	0	2.74	.913
Junior totals			21	—	—	—	—	—	—	3.87	.897
Senior totals			26	11	13	0	1559	64	3	2.56	.916

== Awards and honours ==
Award	Year	Ref
NHL
All-Rookie Team	2014	
William M. Jennings Trophy	2016, 2022	
NHL All-Star Game	2020, 2022	
Stanley Cup champion	2026	
International
Best Goaltender	2018	

Awards and achievements
Preceded by Corey Crawford; Carey Price	William M. Jennings Trophy; 2015–16; With: John Gibson	Succeeded by Braden Holtby
Preceded by Marc-André Fleury; Robin Lehner	William M. Jennings Trophy; 2021–22; With: Antti Raanta	Succeeded by Jeremy Swayman; Linus Ullmark
