= Oskars Bārtulis =

Latvian ice hockey player (born 1987)

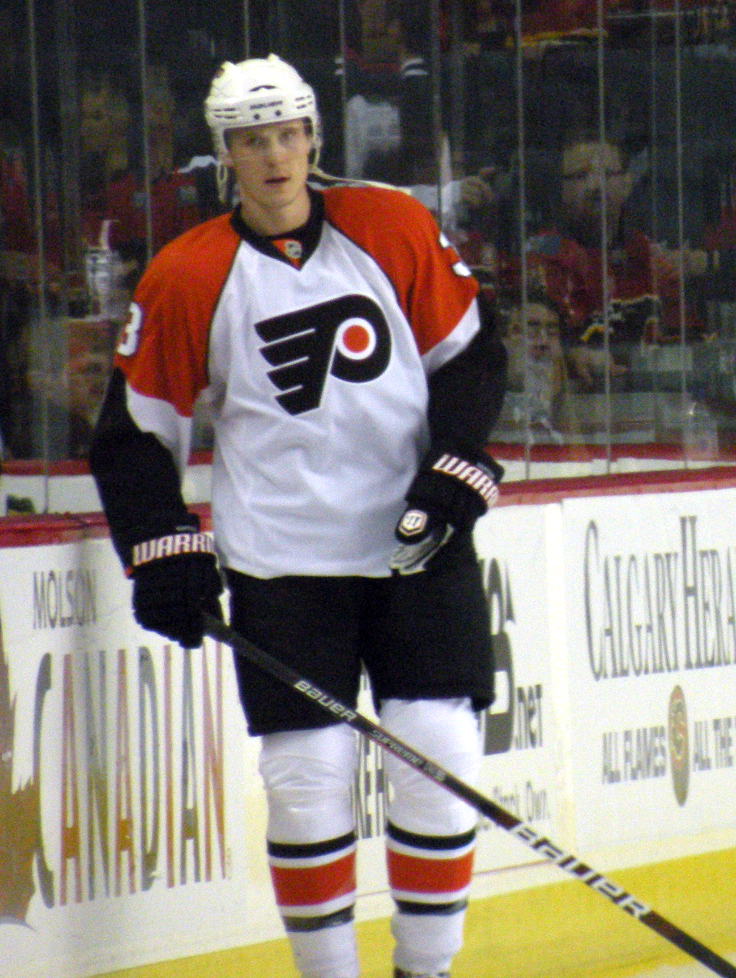
- Born: January 21, 1987 (age 39) Ogre, Latvian SSR, Soviet Union
- Height: 6 ft 2 in (188 cm)
- Weight: 202 lb (92 kg; 14 st 6 lb)
- Position: Defence
- Shoots: Left
- LNNH team: HC Porto
- Played for: Philadelphia Flyers; Donbass Donetsk; Barys Astana; Admiral Vladivostok; Salavat Yulaev Ufa; Kunlun Red Star; Dinamo Riga; HK Mogo
- National team: Latvia
- NHL draft: 91st overall, 2005; Philadelphia Flyers
- Playing career: 2007–present

Oskars Bārtulis (Russian: Оскарс Бартулис; born 21 January 1987) is a Latvian professional ice hockey defenceman for HC Porto of the Liga Nacional de Hockey Hielo. He played parts of two seasons in the National Hockey League (NHL) with the Philadelphia Flyers. In 2018, Bartulis became a Russian citizen and initially ineligible to play for Latvia at national level.

== Playing career ==
Bārtulis was a winger and didn't start playing defence until he was drafted 27th overall by the Moncton Wildcats in the 2004 Canadian Hockey League (CHL) European Draft. He was drafted after just one season with the Wildcats in the third round, 91st overall, in the 2005 NHL entry draft by the Philadelphia Flyers. He was traded to the Cape Breton Screaming Eagles at the 2006 Canadian Hockey League Import Draft.

He signed a three-year entry-level contract with the Philadelphia Flyers on September 23, 2006, following training camp. However, due to junior eligibility, he was returned to the Quebec Major Junior Hockey League (QMJHL) two days later.

Bārtulis made his NHL debut against the Ottawa Senators on November 12, 2009, going scoreless and playing 17:18 minutes of ice time. Impressed with his play after his first 10 games with the team, the Flyers signed Bārtulis to a three-year contract extension on December 2.

On February 22, 2011, Bārtulis received a late hit from former Philadelphia Flyer Scottie Upshall, resulting in a Labral tear of the shoulder. The injury forced Bartulis out for the rest of the season and Scottie Upshall was issued a two-game suspension for the hit. Upshall later apologized and admitted after viewing the replay the hit was late.

On June 30, 2012, Bārtulis' $600,000 contract was bought out by the Flyers after spending the 2011–12 season with the Flyers AHL affiliate.

Entering his seventh season in the KHL in 2018–19, Bārtulis belatedly signed a one-year contract in joining his fifth club in Chinese outfit, Kunlun Red Star, on November 13, 2018.

Following his 15th professional year at the conclusion of the 2021–22 season, Bārtulis ended his playing career and opted to pursue a junior coaching career in Switzerland on 9 September 2022. Bārtulis returned to play in 2023 by signing for Portuguese team HC Porto, before taking a one-year hiatus before returning again in the 2025–26 season.

== Career statistics ==
=== Regular season and playoffs ===
| | | | Regular season | | | | | Playoffs |
| Season | Team | League | GP | G | A | Pts | PIM | GP | G | A | Pts | PIM |
|---|---|---|---|---|---|---|---|---|---|---|---|---|
| 2001–02 | HK Prizma Rīga | LAT | 6 | 0 | 1 | 1 | 2 | — | — | — | — | — |
| 2001–02 | HK Prizma Rīga | EEHL B | 3 | 1 | 0 | 1 | 2 | — | — | — | — | — |
| 2002–03 | HK Prizma Rīga | EEHL B | 12 | 5 | 5 | 10 | 12 | — | — | — | — | — |
| 2002–03 | Vilki OP | LAT | 6 | 0 | 0 | 0 | 8 | 6 | 0 | 1 | 1 | 4 |
| 2003–04 | CSKA–2 Moscow | RUS.3 | 44 | 2 | 6 | 8 | 32 | — | — | — | — | — |
| 2004–05 | Moncton Wildcats | QMJHL | 62 | 5 | 19 | 24 | 55 | 12 | 1 | 1 | 2 | 16 |
| 2005–06 | Moncton Wildcats | QMJHL | 54 | 6 | 25 | 31 | 84 | 21 | 1 | 9 | 10 | 22 |
| 2006–07 | Cape Breton Screaming Eagles | QMJHL | 55 | 13 | 35 | 48 | 52 | 16 | 3 | 9 | 12 | 24 |
| 2007–08 | Philadelphia Phantoms | AHL | 57 | 1 | 20 | 21 | 42 | — | — | — | — | — |
| 2008–09 | Philadelphia Phantoms | AHL | 80 | 2 | 11 | 13 | 59 | 4 | 0 | 0 | 0 | 4 |
| 2009–10 | Adirondack Phantoms | AHL | 12 | 2 | 2 | 4 | 14 | — | — | — | — | — |
| 2009–10 | Philadelphia Flyers | NHL | 53 | 1 | 8 | 9 | 28 | 7 | 0 | 0 | 0 | 4 |
| 2010–11 | Philadelphia Flyers | NHL | 13 | 0 | 0 | 0 | 4 | — | — | — | — | — |
| 2010–11 | Adirondack Phantoms | AHL | 4 | 0 | 1 | 1 | 2 | — | — | — | — | — |
| 2011–12 | Adirondack Phantoms | AHL | 36 | 1 | 10 | 11 | 20 | — | — | — | — | — |
| 2012–13 | Donbass Donetsk | KHL | 40 | 3 | 4 | 7 | 88 | — | — | — | — | — |
| 2013–14 | Donbass Donetsk | KHL | 50 | 2 | 7 | 9 | 28 | 11 | 1 | 3 | 4 | 14 |
| 2014–15 | Barys Astana | KHL | 50 | 1 | 6 | 7 | 54 | 7 | 0 | 0 | 0 | 2 |
| 2015–16 | Admiral Vladivostok | KHL | 52 | 8 | 16 | 24 | 58 | 5 | 0 | 1 | 1 | 4 |
| 2016–17 | Admiral Vladivostok | KHL | 53 | 2 | 7 | 9 | 40 | 6 | 0 | 1 | 1 | 0 |
| 2017–18 | Admiral Vladivostok | KHL | 32 | 0 | 5 | 5 | 38 | — | — | — | — | — |
| 2017–18 | Salavat Yulaev Ufa | KHL | 10 | 0 | 1 | 1 | 6 | 4 | 0 | 0 | 0 | 2 |
| 2018–19 | Kunlun Red Star | KHL | 15 | 2 | 1 | 3 | 8 | — | — | — | — | — |
| 2019–20 | Dinamo Rīga | KHL | 28 | 1 | 7 | 8 | 18 | — | — | — | — | — |
| 2020–21 | HK Mogo/LSPA | LAT | 14 | 3 | 8 | 11 | 8 | — | — | — | — | — |
| 2020–21 | Steinbach Black Wings 1992 | ICEHL | 29 | 3 | 10 | 13 | 30 | — | — | — | — | — |
| 2021–22 | HK Mogo/LSPA | LAT | 27 | 9 | 16 | 25 | 26 | 6 | 0 | 1 | 1 | 4 |
| AHL totals | | | 189 | 6 | 44 | 50 | 137 | 4 | 0 | 0 | 0 | 4 |
| NHL totals | | | 66 | 1 | 8 | 9 | 32 | 7 | 0 | 0 | 0 | 4 |
| KHL totals | | | 330 | 19 | 53 | 72 | 338 | 33 | 1 | 5 | 6 | 22 |

=== International ===
| Year | Team | Event | GP | G | A | Pts | PIM |
|---|---|---|---|---|---|---|---|
| 2003 | Latvia | WJC18 D1 | 5 | 1 | 3 | 4 | 6 |
| 2004 | Latvia | WJC D1 | 5 | 2 | 2 | 4 | 12 |
| 2004 | Latvia | WJC18 D1 | 5 | 3 | 2 | 5 | 16 |
| 2005 | Latvia | WJC D1 | 5 | 1 | 6 | 7 | 6 |
| 2005 | Latvia | WC | 1 | 0 | 0 | 0 | 2 |
| 2006 | Latvia | WJC | 3 | 0 | 0 | 0 | 0 |
| 2007 | Latvia | WJC D1 | 5 | 0 | 7 | 7 | 6 |
| 2009 | Latvia | WC | 4 | 0 | 0 | 0 | 0 |
| 2010 | Latvia | OG | 4 | 0 | 0 | 0 | 2 |
| 2012 | Latvia | WC | 6 | 1 | 2 | 3 | 2 |
| 2013 | Latvia | OGQ | 3 | 1 | 0 | 1 | 4 |
| 2014 | Latvia | OG | 5 | 1 | 0 | 1 | 0 |
| 2016 | Latvia | OGQ | 3 | 0 | 3 | 3 | 4 |
| Junior totals | | | 28 | 7 | 20 | 27 | 46 |
| Senior totals | | | 26 | 3 | 5 | 8 | 14 |

== Awards and honours ==
| Award | Year |
|---|---|
QMJHL
| All-Rookie Team | 2004–05 |
| CHL All-Rookie Team | 2004–05 |
| CHL Top Prospects Game | 2005 |
| Second All-Star Team | 2006–07 |
KHL
| All-Star Game | 2016 |
