= Emma-Sofie Nordstrøm =

Swedish-Danish ice hockey player

- Born: 5 November 2002 (age 24) Herning, Denmark
- Height: 177 cm (5 ft 10 in)
- Position: Goaltender
- Catches: Left
- PWHL team Former teams: Hamilton Havoc: St. Lawrence Saints; Linköping HC; MoDo Hockey; Herning IK
- National team: Denmark
- Playing career: 2013–present

Emma-Sofie Mohrsen Nordström (also Nordstrøm; born 5 November 2002) is a Swedish-Danish ice hockey goaltender, member of the Danish national team and the Hamilton Havoc in the Professional Women's Hockey League. She previously played with the St. Lawrence Saints women's ice hockey program in the ECAC Hockey conference of the NCAA Division I.

== Playing career ==
Nordström made her elite women's league debut as a pre-teen during the 2013–14 season with Herning IK in the DM i ishockey for kvinder, the premier national league in Denmark. She continued playing with Herning IK in the DM for kvinder over the following several seasons and also played with various Herning IK boys' minor ice hockey teams. During the 2017–18 season, she was a member of the Herning IK boys' under-17 junior team in the top-tier U17 league in Denmark.

In 2018, she was admitted to the NIU hockeygymnasium (Note: A hockeygymnasium or ishockeygymnasium is a program created in partnership between a gymnasieskola and an elite ice hockey club that allows students to focus on developing their ice hockey abilities while completing their secondary education. The highest level of hockeygymnasiet designation is Nationellt Idrottsutbildning (lit. 'National Sports Education') or NIU. NIU hockeygymnasier are certified by the Swedish Ice Hockey Association as meeting requirements necessary to consistently produce players who, at a minimum, reach the elite senior national level. NIU programs are free to attend but limited to 14 students or fewer per year, who are selected on the basis of academics and ice hockey ability.) of Modo Hockey and relocated to Örnsköldsvik, Sweden. With the secondary team of Modo Hockey Dam, she played in the DamEttan during the 2018–19 and 2019–20 seasons, recording a subpar save percentage (SV%) of 89.4 and goals against average (GAA) of 3.37 across four games in her first season before improving to an excellent 93.4 SV% and 2.00 GAA across five games in the next season.

Ahead of the 2020–21 season, Nordstrøm signed with Linköping HC Dam in the Swedish Women's Hockey League (SDHL) as backup netminder to Canadian goaltender Stephanie Neatby. She was exemplary across her nine games in net during her rookie campaign, posting a league-leading 94.3 SV% and an elite 1.65 GAA.

Nordström continued to generate excellent statistics in her second season with Linköping, achieving a 94.2 SV% and 1.56 GAA across nine games.

In 2022, she moved to North America to play college ice hockey with the St. Lawrence Saints women's ice hockey program of St. Lawrence University in Canton, New York.

=== Professional ===
On June 17, 2026, Nordström was drafted in the fifth round, 54th overall, by the Hamilton Havoc in the 2026 PWHL Draft.

== International play ==
As a junior player with the Danish national under-18 team, she participated in the IIHF Women's U18 World Championship Division I Group B tournaments in 2017 and 2018, and in the Division I Group A tournaments in 2019 and 2020.

Nordström represented Denmark at the IIHF Women's World Championship Division I Group A tournament in 2018 and at the Top Division tournament in 2021. She was selected to the Danish team for the women's ice hockey tournament at the 2022 Winter Olympics in Beijing, serving as third netminder behind Cassandra Repstock-Romme and Lisa Jensen; she did not dress for any games of the tournament.

== Personal life ==
Nordström is a dual citizen of Denmark and Sweden – her father, Peter Nordström, is Swedish and her mother, Birgitte Mohrsen Nordström (née Andersen), is Danish.

Her mother's side of the family, the Andersens, have earned the moniker "Denmark's hockey factory" due to the number of elite players it has produced. Nordstrøm's mother was a goaltender with the Danish national ice hockey team during the late 1990s and 2000s and participated in five IIHF World Championships across the Pool B, Division I, and Division II levels. Her uncles Ernst Andersen and Kim Mohrs Andersen both represented Denmark at several Ice Hockey World Championship Pool B tournaments in the 1990s. In Nordström's generation, her elder cousin Frederik Andersen is also a goaltender who plays professionally. Bucking the goaltending trend are her younger brother Lukas and elder cousins Amalie Andersen and Sebastian Andersen, all of whom are defensemen, and cousin Karl Andersen, a left winger, who slots in as the only forward of the bunch.

Her father was also a goaltender in high-level Swedish and Danish leagues during the 1990s and 2000s. Melker Thelin, her younger cousin, is active as a goaltender in Swedish junior leagues.

== Career statistics ==
=== International ===
Year	Team	Event	Result	GP	W	L	MIN	GA	SO	GAA	SV%
2017	Denmark	WW18 D1B	2nd	2	1	0	67:13	0	1	0.00	100.0
2018	Denmark	WW18 D1B	1st	2	2	0	120:00	1	1	0.50	95.5
2018	Denmark	WW D1A	4th	3	2	0	157:52	8	1	3.04	90.5
2019	Denmark	WW18 D1A	5th	1	0	1	20:00	4	0	12.00	73.3
2020	Denmark	WW18 D1A	6th	5	0	4	301:30	18	0	3.58	91.9
2021	Denmark	WW	10th	1	0	1	60:00	5	0	5.00	72.2
2022	Denmark	OG	10th	0	–	–	00:00	–	–	–	–
Junior totals				11	3	7	509:35	31	2	–	—
Senior totals				4	2	1	80:00	13	1	–	—
