= Royal Spanish Ice Sports Federation =

Governing body of ice sports in Spain

Real Federación Española de Deportes de Hielo
- Sport: Ice sports
- Category: Bobsleigh; Curling; Figure skating; Ice hockey
- Abbreviation: RFEDH, FedHielo
- Headquarters: Carrer de Roger de Flor, 45; Barcelona, Spain
- President: Frank González
- Vice president: Alberto Serrano
- Director: Marta Olazagarre, figure skating Elena Álvarez, ice hockey Alberto Serrano, ice hockey Xavier Prat, curling

Official website
- www.rfedh.es
- (Spain)

The Royal Spanish Ice Sports Federation (Spanish: Real Federación Española de Deportes de Hielo), abbreviated as RFEDH or FedHielo, is the administrative body for ice sports in Spain. It is a member of the Spanish Olympic Committee (COE) and, in partnership with the Royal Spanish Winter Sports Federation (RFEDI), represents Spain in all international interactions regarding the Winter Olympics. The RFEDH is headquartered in Barcelona and its president is Frank González, a former ice hockey player and official.

The federation was called the Spanish Ice Sports Federation (Spanish: Federación Española de Deportes de Hielo) until S.M. King Felipe VI of Spain conferred the title of Real (Royal) on the federation on 27 July 2017.

== Disciplines ==
RFEDH oversees Spanish involvement in eight disciplines:

- Bobsleigh
- Curling
- Figure skating
- Ice hockey
- Luge
- Skeleton
- Short track speed skating
- Speed skating

The RFEDH governs the qualification and organization of official sports activities and competitions of these disciplines at the state level, in addition to managing the preparation plans for high-level athletes in their respective specialties. It is also the responsibility of the RFEDH to organize or supervise the official international competitions of said specialties that are held in Spain.

== Affiliations ==
The RFEDH is an affiliate member of the following international federations dedicated to the regulation of ice sports at competitive level:

- / International Bobsleigh and Skeleton Federation (FIBT)
- International Luge Federation (FIL)
- International Ice Hockey Federation (IIHF)
- / / International Skating Union (ISU)
- World Curling Federation (WCF)

RFEDH is also a member of the Spanish Olympic Committee, as the governing body over Olympic sport disciplines in Spain.

== National teams ==
RFEDH is responsible for the national teams in each of its disciplines, including managing preparations for top athletic competitions, both nationally and internationally, and generating interest and fostering participation in its designated sports to maintain the high level of talent available to the national teams over time.

=== Ice hockey ===
As of April 2020, the Spanish national program reported a total of 1,043 registered players (227 women, 135 men, and 681 juniors) to the International Ice Hockey Federation (IIHF). The men's national program is ranked 31st on the IIHF World Ranking (2020) and comprises the men's national team, the men's national junior team, and the men's national under-18 team. The women's national program is ranked 25th on the IIHF World Ranking (2020) and comprises the women's national team and the women's national under-18 team.

== Ice hockey ==
In addition to the five national teams, the RFEDH is also the organizing body of the top men's national league, the Liga Nacional de Hockey Hielo (National League of Ice Hockey), and the top women's national league, the Liga Nacional de Hockey Hielo Femenino (Women's National League of Ice Hockey). The Liga Nacional de Hockey was founded in 1972 and CHH Txuri Urdin IHT has been the league's most successful team, winning fifteen championships

== See also ==
- Royal Spanish Winter Sports Federation
