= Amalie Andersen =

Danish ice hockey player (born 1999)

- Born: 6 October 1999 (age 27) Herning, Denmark
- Height: 173 cm (5 ft 8 in)
- Weight: 73 kg (161 lb; 11 st 7 lb)
- Position: Defense
- Shoots: Left
- NDHL team Former teams: Rögle BK: Maine Black Bears; Linköping HC Dam; Herning IK
- National team: Denmark
- Playing career: 2008–present

Amalie Andersen (born 6 October 1999) is a Danish ice hockey player and member of the Danish national team, currently playing in the Swedish Nationella Damhockeyligan (NDHL) with Rögle BK.

== Playing career ==
Andersen's college ice hockey career was played with the Maine Black Bears women's ice hockey program in the Hockey East (WHEA) conference of the NCAA Division I during 2019 to 2023.

She became the first Danish player to sign in the Premier Hockey Federation (PHF) when she accepted a contract with the Buffalo Beauts in early June 2023. The PHF was bought out and dissolved on 29 June 2023 and Andersen's contract was voided before she was able to play in the league.

Following the dissolution of the PHF, she signed with Rögle BK in the NDHL for the 2023–24 season.

=== International play ===
Andersen has represented Denmark at every IIHF Women's World Championship since making her senior national team debut at the 2015 IIHF World Championship Division I A. She played in the 2021 IIHF Women's World Championship, Denmark's first Top Division tournament since 1992, and in the women's ice hockey tournament at the 2022 Winter Olympics, Denmark's Olympic debut in ice hockey.

== Personal life ==
Andersen comes from a family full of ice hockey players, all of whom have played or currently play with the Herning Blue Fox or teams of its affiliate club, Herning IK. Her father, Ernst, played seventeen seasons as a goaltender in the Metal Ligaen and is the current goaltending coach of the Danish men's national ice hockey team and the Herning Blue Fox. Her mother, Charlotte, and uncles Kim Mohrs Andersen and Peter Nordström all played at elite levels in Denmark. Frederik, her eldest brother, was drafted 87th overall by the Anaheim Ducks in the 2012 NHL entry draft and his career has included starting goaltender positions with several NHL teams. Her second-eldest brother, Sebastian, is also a defenceman and represented Denmark with the men's national under-18 and junior ice hockey teams in the early and mid-2010s; he has not played at an elite level since 2019. Her younger brother, Valdemar, and younger cousin, Emma-Sofie Nordström, are also goaltenders.

== Career statistics ==
=== Regular season and playoffs ===
			Regular season					Playoffs
Season	Team	League	GP	G	A	Pts	PIM	GP	G	A	Pts	PIM
2008–09	Herning IK	DM	2	0	0	0	0	–	–	–	–	–
2009–10	Herning IK	DM	1	0	0	0	0	–	–	–	–	–
2010–11	Herning IK	DM	6	1	0	1	0	–	–	–	–	–
2011–12	Herning IK	DM	4	0	0	0	0	–	–	–	–	–
2012–13	Herning IK	DM	7	1	5	6	2	–	–	–	–	–
2013–14	Herning IK	DM	5	0	2	2	4	–	–	–	–	–
2014–15	Herning IK	DM	6	4	4	8	2	5	3	0	3	10
2015–16	Herning IK	DM	9	13	6	19	10	–	–	–	–	–
2015–16	Herning IK U17	Denmark U17	2	0	1	1	0	–	–	–	–	–
2016–17	Linköping HC	SDHL	31	1	0	1	20	5	0	0	0	0
2016–17	Linköping HC 2	DamEttan	4	0	1	1	34	–	–	–	–	–
2017–18	Linköping HC	SDHL	30	0	0	0	4	9	0	0	0	0
2017–18	Linköping HC 2	DamEttan	1	0	0	0	4	–	–	–	–	–
2018–19	Linköping HC	SDHL	36	2	3	5	12	12	1	1	2	6
2019–20	Maine Black Bears	NCAA	25	1	3	4	12	–	–	–	–	–
2020–21	Maine Black Bears	NCAA	10	0	2	2	12	–	–	–	–	–
2021–22	Maine Black Bears	NCAA	17	1	2	3	18	–	–	–	–	–
2022–23	Maine Black Bears	NCAA	8	0	0	0	4	–	–	–	–	—
KvindeLigaen totals			40	19	17	36	18	5	3	0	3	10
SDHL totals			97	3	3	6	36	26	1	1	2	6
NCAA totals			60	2	7	9	46	–	–	–	–	–

=== International ===
Year	Team	Event	Result	GP	G	A	Pts	PIM
2015	Denmark U18	WW18 D1Q	1st	5	1	2	3	10
2015	Denmark	WW D1A	4th	5	0	0	0	2
2016	Denmark U18	WW18 D1	6th	5	0	0	0	12
2016	Denmark	WW D1A	4th	5	0	1	1	2
2017	Denmark U18	WW18 D1B	2nd	5	1	2	3	33
2017	Denmark	WW D1A	4th	5	1	0	1	8
2017	Denmark	OGQ	DNQ	3	1	0	1	2
2018	Denmark	WW D1A	4th	5	0	1	1	6
2019	Denmark	WW D1A	2nd	5	0	1	1	6
2021	Denmark	WW	10th	4	0	0	0	2
2021	Denmark	OGQ	Q	3	0	0	0	6
2022	Denmark	OG	10th	4	0	0	0	2
2022	Denmark	WW	10th	3	0	2	2	0
2023	Denmark	WW D1A	2nd	3	0	0	0	0
Junior totals				15	2	4	6	55
Senior totals				45	2	5	7	36
