= 2019 IIHF Women's World Championship Division I =

International ice hockey tournament

Tournament details
- Host countries: Hungary; China
- Venues: 2 (in 2 host cities)
- Dates: 7–13 April 2019; 6–12 April 2019
- Teams: 12

The 2019 IIHF Women's World Championship Division I consisted of two international ice hockey tournaments organized by the International Ice Hockey Federation. Division I A and Division I B represent the second and third tier of the IIHF Women's World Championship.

Hungary and Denmark earned promotion to the Top Division in Division I Group A, while the Netherlands gained promotion after their Division I Group B victory. Italy and Latvia got relegated by finishing last in their respective group.

== Division I Group A ==
2019 IIHF Women's World Championship Division I A

Tournament details
- Host country: Hungary
- City: Budapest
- Venue: 1 (in 1 host city)
- Dates: 7–13 April 2019
- Teams: 6

Tournament statistics
- Games played: 15
- Goals scored: 80 (5.33 per game)
- Attendance: 7,527 (502 per game)
- Scoring leader: (Hungary) Fanni Gasparics (12 points)

Official website
- www.iihf.com

The Division I Group A tournament was played in Budapest, Hungary, from 7 to 13 April 2019.

=== Participating teams ===
| Team | Qualification |
|---|---|
| Austria | Placed 2nd in Division I A last year. |
| Hungary | Hosts; placed 3rd in Division I A last year. |
| Denmark | Placed 4th in Division I A last year. |
| Norway | Placed 5th in Division I A last year. |
| Slovakia | Placed 6th in Division I A last year. |
| Italy | Placed 1st in Division I B last year and were promoted. |

=== Match officials ===
4 referees and 7 linesmen were selected for the tournament.

| Referees | Linesmen |
|---|---|
| (Canada) Meghan Anne MacTavish; (Finland) Johanna Tauriainen; (France) Marie Picavet; (Switzerland) Drahomira Fialova | (Australia) Beth Bowshall; (Belarus) Vitaliya Khamitsevich; (Belgium) Marine Dinant; (Czech Republic) Kamila Smetková; (Hungary) Adrienn Paulheim; (Slovakia) Magdaléna Čerhitová; (United States) Sara Strong |

=== Final standings ===
| Pos | Team | Pld | W | OTW | OTL | L | GF | GA | GD | Pts | Promotion or relegation |
|---|---|---|---|---|---|---|---|---|---|---|---|
| 1 | Hungary (H) | 5 | 4 | 0 | 1 | 0 | 20 | 6 | +14 | 13 | Promoted to the 2021 Top Division |
| 2 | Denmark | 5 | 3 | 0 | 0 | 2 | 18 | 16 | +2 | 9 (Note: Denmark 4–0 Norway) | Promoted to the 2021 Top Division |
| 3 | Norway | 5 | 3 | 0 | 0 | 2 | 12 | 10 | +2 | 9 | |
| 4 | Austria | 5 | 2 | 1 | 0 | 2 | 20 | 13 | +7 | 8 | |
| 5 | Slovakia | 5 | 1 | 1 | 1 | 2 | 7 | 12 | −5 | 6 | |
| 6 | Italy | 5 | 0 | 0 | 0 | 5 | 3 | 23 | −20 | 0 | Relegated to the 2022 Division I B |

Source: IIHF
Rules for classification: 1) points; 2) head-to-head points; 3) head-to-head goal difference; 4) head-to-head number of goals scored; 5) result against closest best-ranked team outside tied teams; 6) result against second-best-ranked team outside tied teams; 7) seeding before tournament.
(H) Host

=== Match results ===
All times are local (Central European Summer Time – UTC+2).

| 7 April 2019; 13:30 | Slovakia | 1–3 (0–2, 0–0, 1–1) | Denmark | Vasas Jégcentrum, Budapest; Attendance: 165 |

Game reference

Jana Budajová
Goalies
Lisa Jensen
Referee:
(France) Marie Picavet
Linesmen:
(Belgium) Marine Dinant
(United States) Sara Strong

| | 0–1 | 08:41 – Jakobsen |
| | 0–2 | 13:32 – Jakobsen (Persson, Glud) |
| Hlinková (PS) – 52:29 | 1–2 |
| | 1–3 | 53:23 – N. Jensen (Frandsen, Glud) (PP) |

8 min
Penalties
8 min
36
Shots
29

| 7 April 2019; 17:00 | Norway | 1–2 (0–0, 0–0, 1–2) | Hungary | Vasas Jégcentrum, Budapest; Attendance: 1,172 |

Game reference

Ena Nystrøm
Goalies
Anikó Németh
Referee:
(Canada) Meghan Anne MacTavish
Linesmen:
(Slovakia) Magdaléna Čerhitová
(Belarus) Vitaliya Khamitsevich

| | 0–1 | 43:22 – Nooren (PP) |
| Kruse (Tendenes) – 45:56 | 1–1 |
| | 1–2 | 58:48 – Gasparics (Kiss-Simon, Nooren) |

8 min
Penalties
6 min
24
Shots
25

| 7 April 2019; 20:30 | Italy | 1–4 (0–1, 1–3, 0–0) | Austria | Vasas Jégcentrum, Budapest; Attendance: 95 |

Game reference

Giulia Mazzocchi
Goalies
Jessica Ekrt
Referee:
(Finland) Johanna Tauriainen
Linesmen:
(Australia) Beth Bowshall
(Hungary) Adrienn Paulheim

| | 0–1 | 03:02 – Väärälä (Hanser, Fazokas) (PP) |
| | 0–2 | 20:09 – Schafzahl (Altmann, Meixner) (PP) |
| | 0–3 | 27:25 – Schafzahl (Hanser, Verworner) |
| Stocker (Mattivi) (PP) – 28:30 | 1–3 |
| | 1–4 | 32:24 – Wittich (Grascher) |

22 min
Penalties
8 min
13
Shots
36

| 8 April 2019; 13:30 | Denmark | 6–1 (1–0, 3–1, 2–0) | Italy | Vasas Jégcentrum, Budapest; Attendance: 65 |

Game reference

Lisa Jensen
Goalies
Giulia Mazzocchi
Referee:
(Switzerland) Drahomira Fialova
Linesmen:
(Slovakia) Magdaléna Čerhitová
(Czech Republic) Kamila Smetková

| Glud (Frandsen, N. Jensen) (PP) – 13:33 | 1–0 |
| Mic. Hansen – 26:28 | 2–0 |
| Friis-Hansen (N. Jensen) – 28:36 | 3–0 |
| | 3–1 | 32:31 – Roccella |
| Asperup (M. Hansen, Brix) (PP) – 34:05 | 4–1 |
| Persson (Thomsen) – 50:51 | 5–1 |
| Brix (Mic. Hansen) (PP) – 52:57 | 6–1 |

8 min
Penalties
22 min
39
Shots
14

| 8 April 2019; 17:00 | Hungary | 1–2 GWS (1–0, 0–0, 0–1) (OT: 0–0) (SO: 0–1) | Slovakia | Vasas Jégcentrum, Budapest; Attendance: 878 |

Game reference
| Anikó Németh | Goalies | Jana Budajová | Referee: (Finland) Johanna Tauriainen; Linesmen: (Belgium) Marine Dinant (United States) Sara Strong |
| Huszák (Kiss-Simon, Kreisz) (PP) – 04:52 / 1–0; / 1–1 / 45:58 – Korenková (Čupková) | | | Referee: (Finland) Johanna Tauriainen; Linesmen: (Belgium) Marine Dinant (United States) Sara Strong |
| Nooren (miss); Dabasi; Gasparics (miss); Huszák; Kiss-Simon; Huszák | Shootout | (miss) Klimešová; Hlinková; Rumanová; Kúbeková; (miss) Čupková; Hlinková | Referee: (Finland) Johanna Tauriainen; Linesmen: (Belgium) Marine Dinant (United States) Sara Strong |
| 16 min | Penalties | 16 min | Referee: (Finland) Johanna Tauriainen; Linesmen: (Belgium) Marine Dinant (United States) Sara Strong |
| 35 | Shots | 42 | Referee: (Finland) Johanna Tauriainen; Linesmen: (Belgium) Marine Dinant (United States) Sara Strong |

| 8 April 2019; 20:30 | Austria | 4–5 (2–4, 2–1, 0–0) | Norway | Vasas Jégcentrum, Budapest; Attendance: 115 |

Game reference

Nicole Arnberger
Jessica Ekrt
Goalies
Ena Nystrøm
Referee:
(Canada) Meghan Anne MacTavish
Linesmen:
(Belarus) Vitaliya Khamitsevich
(Hungary) Adrienn Paulheim

| | 0–1 | 03:05 – Haug Hansen (Bialik, Dalen) |
| | 0–2 | 10:07 – Sirum (Dalen, Haug Hansen) (PP) |
| | 0–3 | 12:08 – Haug Hansen (Sirum, Morset) |
| Meixner (Altmann, Väärälä) – 13:33 | 1–3 |
| | 1–4 | 18:27 – Dalen (Tendenes, Bialik) |
| Verworner (Hanser) – 19:22 | 2–4 |
| Altmann (Väärälä) – 20:36 | 3–4 |
| Schafzahl (Verworner) – 04:52 | 4–4 |
| | 4–5 | 27:10 – Bialik (Haug Hansen, Biseth Engmann) |

8 min
Penalties
4 min
28
Shots
26

| 10 April 2019; 13:30 | Italy | 0–2 (0–1, 0–0, 0–1) | Norway | Vasas Jégcentrum, Budapest; Attendance: 72 |

Game reference
| Giulia Mazzocchi | Goalies | Ena Nystrøm | Referee: (France) Marie Picavet; Linesmen: (Belgium) Marine Dinant (Czech Republic) Kamila Smetková |
| 0–1 / 19:34 – Tendenes (Pedersen, Biseth); 0–2 / 46:25 – Biseth (Kruse, Tendenes) | | | Referee: (France) Marie Picavet; Linesmen: (Belgium) Marine Dinant (Czech Republic) Kamila Smetková |
| 12 min | Penalties | 6 min | Referee: (France) Marie Picavet; Linesmen: (Belgium) Marine Dinant (Czech Republic) Kamila Smetková |
| 15 | Shots | 30 | Referee: (France) Marie Picavet; Linesmen: (Belgium) Marine Dinant (Czech Republic) Kamila Smetková |

| 10 April 2019; 17:00 | Hungary | 6–2 (0–2, 4–0, 2–0) | Denmark | Vasas Jégcentrum, Budapest; Attendance: 1,054 |

Game reference

Stephanie Nehring
Goalies
Lisa Jensen
Referee:
(Switzerland) Drahomira Fialova
Linesmen:
(Australia) Beth Bowshall
(Slovakia) Magdaléna Čerhitová

| | 0–1 | 09:57 – Persson (Glud) |
| | 0–2 | 13:28 – Persson (Jakobsen) |
| Nooren (Gasparics, B. Németh) (PP) – 26:58 | 1–2 |
| Gasparics – 30:41 | 2–2 |
| Gasparics (Nooren, Tóth) – 32:43 | 3–2 |
| Nooren (Gasparics) – 34:19 | 4–2 |
| Huszák (Gowie, Dabasi) (PP) – 46:42 | 5–2 |
| Dabasi (EN) – 57:01 | 6–2 |

6 min
Penalties
14 min
33
Shots
17

| 10 April 2019; 20:30 | Austria | 3–2 GWS (1–1, 0–0, 1–1) (OT: 0–0) (SO: 1–0) | Slovakia | Vasas Jégcentrum, Budapest; Attendance: 38 |

Game reference

Jessica Ekrt
Goalies
Jana Budajová
Referee:
(Canada) Meghan Anne MacTavish
Linesmen:
(Hungary) Adrienn Paulheim
(United States) Sara Strong

| | 0–1 | 06:32 – T. Ištocyová (Šulíková) (PP) |
| Grascher (Volgger) – 10:59 | 1–1 |
| | 1–2 | 43:25 – Hlinková (Čupková, T. Ištocyová) |
| Altmann (Verworner, Matzka) – 45:47 | 2–2 |

Schafzahl (miss)
Volgger
Altmann (miss)
Hanser
Shootout
(miss) Hlinková
Košecká
(miss) Rumanová
(miss) Kúbeková
(miss) Kučerková
4 min
Penalties
8 min
30
Shots
24

| 12 April 2019; 13:30 | Norway | 4–0 (2–0, 1–0, 1–0) | Slovakia | Vasas Jégcentrum, Budapest; Attendance: 195 |

Game reference

Ena Nystrøm
Goalies
Andrea Lettrichová
Jana Budajová
Referee:
(Finland) Johanna Tauriainen
Linesmen:
(Australia) Beth Bowshall
(Hungary) Adrienn Paulheim

| Haug Hansen (Sirum) – 03:13 | 1–0 |
| Strømstad (Bergesen, Sirum) – 16:55 | 2–0 |
| Sirum (Bialik, Haug Hansen) (PP) – 33:26 | 3–0 |
| Kruse (Haug Hansen) (EN) – 56:44 | 4–0 |

10 min
Penalties
10 min
21
Shots
23

| 12 April 2019; 17:00 | Hungary | 9–0 (3–0, 4–0, 2–0) | Italy | Vasas Jégcentrum, Budapest; Attendance: 1,310 |

Game reference

Anikó Németh
Goalies
Giulia Mazzocchi
Elisa Biondi
Referee:
(Switzerland) Drahomira Fialova
Linesmen:
(Belgium) Marine Dinant
(Belarus) Vitaliya Khamitsevich

| Gasparics (Kiss-Simon) (PP) – 10:30 | 1–0 |
| Dabasi (Huszák) – 13:39 | 2–0 |
| Gasparics (Nooren, L. Pintér) – 16:30 | 3–0 |
| Nooren (B. Németh, Gasparics) (PP) – 21:03 | 4–0 |
| Nooren (Odnoga, L. Pintér) (PP) – 23:37 | 5–0 |
| Rónai (Gasparics, Nooren) – 31:17 | 6–0 |
| Horvath (Gasparics, L. Pintér) (PP) – 34:12 | 7–0 |
| Seregély (Kreisz) (PP) – 57:47 | 8–0 |
| Rónai (B. Németh, Odnoga) (EA) – 58:52 | 9–0 |

12 min
Penalties
16 min
42
Shots
13

| 12 April 2019; 20:30 | Denmark | 3–8 (1–4, 1–2, 1–2) | Austria | Vasas Jégcentrum, Budapest; Attendance: 137 |

Game reference

Lisa Jensen
Cassandra Repstock-Romme
Goalies
Jessica Ekrt
Referee:
(France) Marie Picavet
Linesmen:
(Czech Republic) Kamila Smetková
(United States) Sara Strong

| | 0–1 | 03:30 – Volgger (Hanser) |
| | 0–2 | 05:17 – Altmann (Wittich) |
| | 0–3 | 09:35 – Schafzahl (Wittich, Matzka) (PP) |
| | 0–4 | 12:23 – Lopez (Volgger) |
| Frandsen (Glud, Jakobsen) (PP) – 19:38 | 1–4 |
| Jakobsen (Persson) – 20:19 | 2–4 |
| | 2–5 | 21:48 – Fazokas |
| | 2–6 | 35:29 – Schafzahl (Altmann) |
| | 2–7 | 46:47 – Meixner (PS) |
| Persson (Jakobsen, Frandsen) (PP) – 51:15 | 3–7 |
| | 3–8 | 51:44 – Matzka (Wittich, Altmann) (PP) |

10 min
Penalties
8 min
21
Shots
26

| 13 April 2019; 12:30 | Slovakia | 2–1 (1–0, 1–1, 0–0) | Italy | Vasas Jégcentrum, Budapest; Attendance: 122 |

Game reference

Jana Budajová
Goalies
Giulia Mazzocchi
Referee:
(Switzerland) Drahomira Fialova
Linesmen:
(Australia) Beth Bowshall
(Belarus) Vitaliya Khamitsevich

| Halušková (Košecká) – 04:10 | 1–0 |
| Klimešová (Halušková) – 26:00 | 2–0 |
| | 2–1 | 35:58 – Mattivi (Mistrotofolo) |

10 min
Penalties
10 min
36
Shots
19

| 13 April 2019; 16:00 | Denmark | 4–0 (1–0, 1–0, 2–0) | Norway | Vasas Jégcentrum, Budapest; Attendance: 165 |

Game reference

Cassandra Repstock-Romme
Goalies
Ena Nystrøm
Referee:
(Canada) Meghan Anne MacTavish
Linesmen:
(Belgium) Marine Dinant
(Czech Republic) Kamila Smetková

| Jakobsen (N. Jensen, Asperup) – 09:52 | 1–0 |
| Jakobsen (Oksbjerg) – 32:11 | 2–0 |
| N. Jensen (Persson, Andersen) – 50:11 | 3–0 |
| Glud (Persson) (EN) – 58:17 | 4–0 |

8 min
Penalties
6 min
28
Shots
27

| 13 April 2019; 19:30 | Austria | 1–2 (1–1, 0–0, 0–1) | Hungary | Vasas Jégcentrum, Budapest; Attendance: 1,944 |

Game reference

Jessica Ekrt
Goalies
Anikó Németh
Referee:
(France) Marie Picavet
Linesmen:
(Slovakia) Magdaléna Čerhitová
(United States) Sara Strong

| | 0–1 | 00:21 – Gasparics (Kreisz) |
| Meixner – 04:01 | 1–1 |
| | 1–2 | 48:46 – B. Németh (Gasparics) (PP) |

16 min
Penalties
6 min
15
Shots
33

=== Awards and statistics ===
==== Awards ====
- Best players selected by the directorate:
  - Best Goalkeeper: (Norway) Ena Nystrøm
  - Best Defenseman: (Austria) Charlotte Wittich
  - Best Forward: (Hungary) Fanni Gasparics

Source: IIHF.com

==== Scoring leaders ====
List shows the top skaters sorted by points, then goals.

| Player | GP | G | A | Pts | +/− | PIM | POS |
|---|---|---|---|---|---|---|---|
| (Hungary) Fanni Gasparics | 5 | 6 | 6 | 12 | +5 | 2 | F |
| (Hungary) Averi Nooren | 5 | 5 | 4 | 9 | +5 | 0 | F |
| (Denmark) Josefine Jakobsen | 5 | 5 | 3 | 8 | +7 | 6 | F |
| (Denmark) Josefine Persson | 5 | 4 | 4 | 8 | +8 | 4 | F |
| (Austria) Denise Altmann | 5 | 3 | 4 | 7 | +2 | 2 | F |
| (Norway) Madelen Haug Hansen | 5 | 3 | 4 | 7 | +3 | 2 | F |
| (Denmark) Silke Glud | 5 | 2 | 4 | 6 | +9 | 2 | F |
| (Austria) Theresa Schafzahl | 5 | 5 | 0 | 5 | +1 | 2 | F |
| (Denmark) Nicoline Jensen | 5 | 2 | 3 | 5 | +2 | 2 | F |
| (Norway) Millie Sirum | 5 | 2 | 3 | 5 | −2 | 2 | F |

GP = Games played; G = Goals; A = Assists; Pts = Points; +/− = Plus/minus; PIM = Penalties in minutes; POS = Position
Source: IIHF.com

==== Leading goaltenders ====
Only the top five goaltenders, based on save percentage, who have played at least 40% of their team's minutes, are included in this list.

| Player | TOI | GA | GAA | SA | Sv% | SO |
|---|---|---|---|---|---|---|
| (Hungary) Anikó Németh | 245:00 | 3 | 0.73 | 93 | 96.77 | 1 |
| (Slovakia) Jana Budajová | 288:01 | 8 | 1.67 | 125 | 93.60 | 0 |
| (Norway) Ena Nystrøm | 296:47 | 9 | 1.82 | 118 | 92.37 | 2 |
| (Austria) Jessica Ekrt | 280:23 | 9 | 1.92 | 106 | 91.51 | 0 |
| (Italy) Giulia Mazzocchi | 250:43 | 18 | 4.31 | 156 | 88.46 | 0 |

TOI = Time on ice (minutes:seconds); SA = Shots against; GA = Goals against; GAA = Goals against average; Sv% = Save percentage; SO = Shutouts
Source: IIHF.com

== Division I Group B ==
2019 IIHF Women's World Championship Division I B

Tournament details
- Host country: China
- City: Beijing
- Venue: 1 (in 1 host city)
- Dates: 6–12 April 2019
- Teams: 6

Tournament statistics
- Games played: 15
- Goals scored: 71 (4.73 per game)
- Attendance: 17,980 (1,199 per game)
- Scoring leader: (Netherlands) Savine Wielenga (10 points)

Official website
- www.iihf.com

The Division I Group B tournament was played in Beijing, China, from 6 to 12 April 2019.

=== Participating teams ===
| Team | Qualification |
|---|---|
| South Korea | Placed 2nd in Division I B last year. |
| Latvia | Placed 3rd in Division I B last year. |
| Kazakhstan | Placed 4th in Division I B last year. |
| China | Hosts; placed 5th in Division I B last year. |
| Poland | Placed 6th in Division I B last year. |
| Netherlands | Placed 1st in Division II A last year and were promoted. |

=== Match officials ===
4 referees and 7 linesmen were selected for the tournament.

| Referees | Linesmen |
|---|---|
| (Czech Republic) Ilona Novotná; (United Kingdom) Deana Cuglietta; (Netherlands) Debby Hengst; (United States) Kristine Langley | (Canada) Alexandra Blair; (China) Wang Hui; (China) Wu Xing; (Czech Republic) Veronika Lounová; (Denmark) Loise Lybak Larsen; (Finland) Jenna Puhakka; (Sweden) Liv Andersson |

=== Final standings ===
| Pos | Team | Pld | W | OTW | OTL | L | GF | GA | GD | Pts | Promotion or relegation |
|---|---|---|---|---|---|---|---|---|---|---|---|
| 1 | Netherlands | 5 | 5 | 0 | 0 | 0 | 17 | 4 | +13 | 15 | Promoted to the 2022 Division I A |
| 2 | South Korea | 5 | 3 | 0 | 0 | 2 | 17 | 15 | +2 | 9 (Note: South Korea 4–3 Poland) | |
| 3 | Poland | 5 | 3 | 0 | 0 | 2 | 13 | 12 | +1 | 9 | |
| 4 | China (H) | 5 | 2 | 0 | 0 | 3 | 12 | 12 | 0 | 6 | |
| 5 | Kazakhstan | 5 | 1 | 0 | 1 | 3 | 8 | 16 | −8 | 4 | |
| 6 | Latvia | 5 | 0 | 1 | 0 | 4 | 4 | 12 | −8 | 2 | Relegated to the 2022 Division II A |

Source: IIHF
Rules for classification: 1) points; 2) head-to-head points; 3) head-to-head goal difference; 4) head-to-head number of goals scored; 5) result against closest best-ranked team outside tied teams; 6) result against second-best-ranked team outside tied teams; 7) seeding before tournament.
(H) Host

=== Match results ===
All times are local (China Standard Time – UTC+8).

| 6 April 2019; 13:00 | China | 3–0 (0–0, 1–0, 2–0) | Latvia | Shougang Ice Rink, Beijing; Attendance: 1,510 |

Game reference

Wang Yuqing
Goalies
Kristiāna Apsīte
Referee:
(Netherlands) Debby Hengst
Linesmen:
(Czech Republic) Veronika Lounová
(Finland) Jenna Puhakka

| Lu (Deng, Zhang) (PP) – 34:09 | 1–0 |
| Lu (Ma, Yu) – 42:18 | 2–0 |
| Fang (Zhu) – 58:33 | 3–0 |

35 min
Penalties
10 min
61
Shots
9

| 6 April 2019; 16:30 | Netherlands | 5–2 (2–1, 0–0, 3–1) | South Korea | Shougang Ice Rink, Beijing; Attendance: 1,460 |

Game reference

Nadia Zijlstra
Goalies
Han Do-hee
Referee:
(United Kingdom) Deana Cuglietta
Linesmen:
(Canada) Alexandra Blair
(China) Wu Xing

| Tjin-a-Ton (Hamers, Barton) – 06:50 | 1–0 |
| Barbier (Van Ooijen, Van Nes) – 08:08 | 2–0 |
| | 2–1 | 19:00 – Kim H. (Eom, Choi Ji.) (PP, EA) |
| Wielenga (Van Nes, Hamers) (PP) – 50:16 | 3–1 |
| Hamers (Wielenga) (PP) – 51:00 | 4–1 |
| Even (Wielenga, Huisman) (SH) – 53:52 | 5–1 |
| | 5–2 | 54:44 – Choi Ji. |

18 min
Penalties
26 min
33
Shots
27

| 6 April 2019; 20:00 | Poland | 5–3 (3–1, 1–1, 1–1) | Kazakhstan | Shougang Ice Rink, Beijing; Attendance: 1,430 |

Game reference

Martyna Sass
Goalies
Daria Dmitrieva
Arina Shyokolova
Referee:
(United States) Kristine Langley
Linesmen:
(Sweden) Liv Andersson
(China) Wang Hui

| Późniewska (SH) – 03:01 | 1–0 |
| Późniewska – 06:39 | 2–0 |
| | 2–1 | 09:36 – Moldabay (Ashimova) |
| Czaplik (Późniewska) – 19:06 | 3–1 |
| Chrapek (Późniewska, Czaplik) – 26:38 | 4–1 |
| | 4–2 | 34:52 – Orazbayeva (Aldabergenova, Kitaibekova) |
| Czaplik (Późniewska, Wieczorek) – 58:59 | 5–2 |
| | 5–3 | 59:50 – Aldabergenova (Olzhabayeva) |

6 min
Penalties
4 min
27
Shots
31

| 7 April 2019; 13:00 | South Korea | 2–5 (1–1, 0–1, 1–3) | China | Shougang Ice Rink, Beijing; Attendance: 1,600 |

Game reference

Han Do-hee
Goalies
Wang Yuqing
Referee:
(United States) Kristine Langley
Linesmen:
(Sweden) Liv Andersson
(Canada) Alexandra Blair

| Lee E. (Kim H.) – 02:22 | 1–0 |
| | 1–1 | 07:32 – Fang (Kong, Zhu) |
| | 1–2 | 28:41 – Liu Z. |
| | 1–3 | 43:52 – Fang (Yang) |
| | 1–4 | 50:12 – Pi (Ma, Deng) |
| Kim H. (Eom, Park Jo.) (PP, EA) – 57:21 | 2–4 |
| | 2–5 | 57:45 – Kong (Deng) |

4 min
Penalties
8 min
19
Shots
29

| 7 April 2019; 16:30 | Kazakhstan | 1–3 (0–2, 1–0, 0–1) | Netherlands | Shougang Ice Rink, Beijing; Attendance: 950 |

Game reference

Daria Dmitrieva
Goalies
Lisa Daams
Referee:
(Czech Republic) Ilona Novotná
Linesmen:
(Czech Republic) Veronika Lounová
(Finland) Jenna Puhakka

| | 0–1 | 08:54 – Wielenga (Van Nes) (PP) |
| | 0–2 | 11:08 – Tjin-a-Ton (Barton) |
| Koroleva (Konysheva) (PP) – 38:46 | 1–2 |
| | 1–3 | 59:54 – Wielenga (Even) (EN) |

14 min
Penalties
10 min
17
Shots
49

| 7 April 2019; 20:00 | Latvia | 0–1 (0–1, 0–0, 0–0) | Poland | Shougang Ice Rink, Beijing; Attendance: 450 |

Game reference
| Kristiāna Apsīte | Goalies | Martyna Sass | Referee: (United Kingdom) Deana Cuglietta; Linesmen: (Denmark) Loise Lybak Larsen (China) Wang Hui |
| 0–1 / 19:31 – Chrapek (Późniewska, Czaplik) (PP) | | | Referee: (United Kingdom) Deana Cuglietta; Linesmen: (Denmark) Loise Lybak Larsen (China) Wang Hui |
| 22 min | Penalties | 14 min | Referee: (United Kingdom) Deana Cuglietta; Linesmen: (Denmark) Loise Lybak Larsen (China) Wang Hui |
| 22 | Shots | 52 | Referee: (United Kingdom) Deana Cuglietta; Linesmen: (Denmark) Loise Lybak Larsen (China) Wang Hui |

| 9 April 2019; 13:00 | Latvia | 2–1 GWS (1–1, 0–0, 0–0) (OT: 0–0) (SO: 1–0) | Kazakhstan | Shougang Ice Rink, Beijing; Attendance: 1,200 |

Game reference
| Kristiāna Apsīte | Goalies | Daria Dmitrieva | Referee: (Netherlands) Debby Hengst; Linesmen: (Canada) Alexandra Blair (China) Wang Hui |
| Pētersone (Mihejenko) – 03:19 / 1–0; / 1–1 / 10:00 – Aldabergenova (Kuzmina) | | | Referee: (Netherlands) Debby Hengst; Linesmen: (Canada) Alexandra Blair (China) Wang Hui |
| Pētersone; Miljone (miss); Kublina; Ozmena | Shootout | Ashimova; (miss) Sviridova; (miss) Aldabergenova; (miss) Koroleva | Referee: (Netherlands) Debby Hengst; Linesmen: (Canada) Alexandra Blair (China) Wang Hui |
| 31 min | Penalties | 8 min | Referee: (Netherlands) Debby Hengst; Linesmen: (Canada) Alexandra Blair (China) Wang Hui |
| 24 | Shots | 59 | Referee: (Netherlands) Debby Hengst; Linesmen: (Canada) Alexandra Blair (China) Wang Hui |

| 9 April 2019; 16:30 | Netherlands | 4–0 (0–0, 2–0, 2–0) | China | Shougang Ice Rink, Beijing; Attendance: 1,570 |

Game reference

Nadia Zijlstra
Goalies
Wang Yuqing
Referee:
(United States) Kristine Langley
Linesmen:
(Denmark) Loise Lybak Larsen
(Finland) Jenna Puhakka

| Wielenga – 23:06 | 1–0 |
| Wielenga (Noë, De Jong) – 26:27 | 2–0 |
| Schollaardt (Barbier) – 41:11 | 3–0 |
| Hamers (Barbier, Van Nes) – 55:08 | 4–0 |

6 min
Penalties
6 min
34
Shots
19

| 9 April 2019; 20:00 | South Korea | 4–3 (0–2, 3–0, 1–1) | Poland | Shougang Ice Rink, Beijing; Attendance: 750 |

Game reference

Han Do-hee
Goalies
Martyna Sass
Referee:
(Czech Republic) Ilona Novotná
Linesmen:
(Sweden) Liv Andersson
(China) Wu Xing

| | 0–1 | 05:32 – Sfora (Wieczorek) (PP) |
| | 0–2 | 06:59 – Późniewska (Wieczorek) |
| Choi Y. (Kim S.) (PP) – 32:40 | 1–2 |
| Choi Ji. (Kim H., Jo) (PP) – 36:26 | 2–2 |
| Park C. (Park Y., Park Jo.) – 38:33 | 3–2 |
| Park Jo. – 40:47 | 4–2 |
| | 4–3 | 54:29 – Wieczorek (PP) |

10 min
Penalties
24 min
35
Shots
19

| 10 April 2019; 13:00 | Latvia | 1–3 (1–0, 0–1, 0–2) | Netherlands | Shougang Ice Rink, Beijing; Attendance: 1,650 |

Game reference

Evija Tētiņa
Goalies
Nadia Zijlstra
Referee:
(United Kingdom) Deana Cuglietta
Linesmen:
(Denmark) Loise Lybak Larsen
(China) Wu Xing

| Miljone – 10:41 | 1–0 |
| | 1–1 | 35:59 – Barton (Dijkema, Tjin-a-Ton) |
| | 1–2 | 51:12 – Huisman (Wielenga, Hamers) (PP) |
| | 1–3 | 58:39 – Wielenga (EN) |

6 min
Penalties
12 min
14
Shots
45

| 10 April 2019; 16:30 | China | 3–4 (1–1, 0–2, 2–1) | Poland | Shougang Ice Rink, Beijing; Attendance: 1,580 |

Game reference

Wang Yuqing
Goalies
Martyna Sass
Referee:
(Czech Republic) Ilona Novotná
Linesmen:
(Canada) Alexandra Blair
(Finland) Jenna Puhakka

| He X. (Yang) – 00:55 | 1–0 |
| | 1–1 | 12:00 – Sikorska (Dziwok) |
| | 1–2 | 32:32 – Późniewska (Wieczorek, Czaplik) (PP) |
| | 1–3 | 37:17 – Gogoc (Kamińska) (PP) |
| | 1–4 | 50:02 – Późniewska (Czaplik, Wieczorek) (PP) |
| Fang (PS) – 52:24 | 2–4 |
| Fang (Ma) (PP) – 53:10 | 3–4 |

14 min
Penalties
12 min
38
Shots
31

| 10 April 2019; 20:00 | Kazakhstan | 1–5 (0–2, 0–2, 1–1) | South Korea | Shougang Ice Rink, Beijing; Attendance: 280 |

Game reference

Daria Dmitrieva
Arina Shyokolova
Goalies
Han Do-hee
Referee:
(Netherlands) Debby Hengst
Linesmen:
(Czech Republic) Veronika Lounová
(China) Wang Hui

| | 0–1 | 08:26 – Park Jo. (Eom, Song) (PP) |
| | 0–2 | 19:03 – Park Jo. (Park C., Kim S.) |
| | 0–3 | 23:38 – Park C. (Park Jo., Choi Y.) (PP2) |
| | 0–4 | 24:20 – Kim H. (Kim S., Jo) (PP) |
| Orazbayeva (Tursynova) – 51:47 | 1–4 |
| | 1–5 | 54:46 – Park C. (Eom, Song) (PP) |

14 min
Penalties
6 min
42
Shots
39

| 12 April 2019; 13:00 | Poland | 0–2 (0–0, 0–1, 0–1) | Netherlands | Shougang Ice Rink, Beijing; Attendance: 950 |

Game reference
| Martyna Sass | Goalies | Nadia Zijlstra | Referee: (United States) Kristine Langley; Linesmen: (Sweden) Liv Andersson (China) Wang Hui |
| 0–1 / 20:30 – Wielenga (De Jong, Hamers); 0–2 / 48:52 – Barbier (Schollaardt) | | | Referee: (United States) Kristine Langley; Linesmen: (Sweden) Liv Andersson (China) Wang Hui |
| 6 min | Penalties | 8 min | Referee: (United States) Kristine Langley; Linesmen: (Sweden) Liv Andersson (China) Wang Hui |
| 13 | Shots | 46 | Referee: (United States) Kristine Langley; Linesmen: (Sweden) Liv Andersson (China) Wang Hui |

| 12 April 2019; 16:30 | South Korea | 4–1 (2–1, 1–0, 1–0) | Latvia | Shougang Ice Rink, Beijing; Attendance: 950 |

Game reference

Han Do-hee
Goalies
Kristiāna Apsīte
Referee:
(Czech Republic) Ilona Novotná
Linesmen:
(Canada) Alexandra Blair
(China) Wu Xing

| Park Jo. – 01:17 | 1–0 |
| | 1–1 | 06:10 – A. Apsīte (Mihejenko, Pētersone) (PP) |
| Song (Park Jo.) (PP) – 18:32 | 2–1 |
| Kim H. (Jo) (PP) – 34:10 | 3–1 |
| Park Jo. (Choi Y.) – 50:35 | 4–1 |

6 min
Penalties
10 min
43
Shots
10

| 12 April 2019; 20:00 | Kazakhstan | 2–1 (0–0, 2–1, 0–0) | China | Shougang Ice Rink, Beijing; Attendance: 1,650 |

Game reference

Daria Dmitrieva
Goalies
Wang Yuqing
Referee:
(United Kingdom) Deana Cuglietta
Linesmen:
(Denmark) Loise Lybak Larsen
(Czech Republic) Veronika Lounová

| Sviridova (Kartanbayeva) – 28:31 | 1–0 |
| Nurgaliyeva (Shegebayeva, Ashimova) (PP) – 32:01 | 2–0 |
| | 2–1 | 37:43 – Ma |

2 min
Penalties
4 min
32
Shots
38

=== Awards and statistics ===
==== Awards ====
- Best players selected by the directorate:
  - Best Goalkeeper: (Latvia) Kristiāna Apsīte
  - Best Defenseman: (South Korea) Park Chae-lin
  - Best Forward: (Netherlands) Savine Wielenga

Source: IIHF.com

- Media All-Stars:
  - MVP: (China) Fang Xin

Source: IIHF.com

==== Scoring leaders ====
List shows the top skaters sorted by points, then goals.

| Player | GP | G | A | Pts | +/− | PIM | POS |
|---|---|---|---|---|---|---|---|
| (Netherlands) Savine Wielenga | 5 | 8 | 2 | 10 | +5 | 0 | F |
| (South Korea) Park Jong-ah | 5 | 6 | 4 | 10 | +1 | 2 | F |
| (Poland) Karolina Późniewska | 5 | 5 | 4 | 9 | +3 | 8 | F |
| (South Korea) Kim Hee-won | 5 | 4 | 2 | 6 | −3 | 4 | F |
| (Poland) Magdalena Czaplik | 5 | 2 | 4 | 6 | +3 | 2 | F |
| (Netherlands) Kayleigh Hamers | 5 | 2 | 4 | 6 | +4 | 6 | D |
| (Poland) Kamila Wieczorek | 5 | 1 | 5 | 6 | +1 | 4 | F |
| (China) Fang Xin | 5 | 5 | 0 | 5 | +4 | 2 | F |
| (Netherlands) Bieke van Nes | 5 | 0 | 5 | 5 | +4 | 2 | F |
| (Netherlands) Zoë Barbier | 5 | 2 | 2 | 4 | +4 | 0 | F |
| (South Korea) Park Chae-lin | 5 | 2 | 2 | 4 | −2 | 0 | D |

GP = Games played; G = Goals; A = Assists; Pts = Points; +/− = Plus/minus; PIM = Penalties in minutes; POS = Position
Source: IIHF.com

==== Leading goaltenders ====
Only the top five goaltenders, based on save percentage, who have played at least 40% of their team's minutes, are included in this list.

| Player | TOI | GA | GAA | SA | Sv% | SO |
|---|---|---|---|---|---|---|
| (Latvia) Kristiāna Apsīte | 240:34 | 8 | 2.00 | 214 | 96.26 | 0 |
| (Netherlands) Nadia Zijlstra | 239:53 | 3 | 0.75 | 73 | 95.89 | 2 |
| (Poland) Martyna Sass | 299:54 | 12 | 2.40 | 172 | 93.02 | 1 |
| (Kazakhstan) Daria Dmitrieva | 230:32 | 10 | 2.60 | 136 | 92.65 | 0 |
| (China) Wang Yuqing | 299:10 | 12 | 2.41 | 125 | 90.40 | 1 |

TOI = Time on ice (minutes:seconds); SA = Shots against; GA = Goals against; GAA = Goals against average; Sv% = Save percentage; SO = Shutouts
Source: IIHF.com
