= Liga Nacional de Hockey Hielo Femenino =

Spanish women's ice hockey league

- Sport: Ice hockey
- Founded: 2008
- Founder: RFEDH
- First season: 2008–09
- No. of teams: 7
- Country: Spain
- Most recent champion: Jaca (2022–23)
- Most titles: SAD Majadahonda (8)
- Broadcaster: LaLigaSports
- Related competitions: Liga Nacional Masculina
- Website: RFEDH

The Liga Nacional de Hockey Hielo Femenino (National Women's Ice Hockey League) is the national women's ice hockey league in Spain. The league was founded in 2008 and is overseen by the Spanish Ice Sports Federation (RFEDH). SAD Majadahonda is the league's most successful team, having won six championships over the eleven seasons the league has been operational. The Valladolid Panteras are the second most successful team in the league, having won four championships.

== Champions ==
- 2009 - Valladolid Panteras
- 2010 - Valladolid Panteras
- 2011 - Valladolid Panteras
- 2012 - Valladolid Panteras
- 2013 - SAD Majadahonda
- 2014 - SAD Majadahonda
- 2015 - SAD Majadahonda
- 2016 - FC Barcelona
- 2017 - SAD Majadahonda
- 2018 - SAD Majadahonda
- 2019 - SAD Majadahonda
- 2020 - SAD Majadahonda
- 2021 - SAD Majadahonda
- 2022 - CHH Txuri Urdin
- 2023 - CH Jaca

== Spanish Cup ==
The Spanish Cup of Women's Ice Hockey (Spanish: Copa de España de Hockey Hielo Femenino) pits the league winner and runner-up against each other.

- 2009 - SAD Majadahonda
- 2010 - SAD Majadahonda
- 2011 - Valladolid Panteras
- 2012 - SAD Majadahonda
- 2013 - SAD Majadahonda
- 2014 - SAD Majadahonda
- 2015 - SAD Majadahonda
- 2016 - FC Barcelona
- 2017 - SAD Majadahonda
- 2018 - SAD Majadahonda
- 2019 - SAD Majadahonda
- 2020 - Cancelled due to COVID-19
- 2021 - SAD Majadahonda
- 2022 - CHH Txuri Urdin
- 2023 - SAD Majadahonda
