= Giulia Mazzocchi =

Italian ice hockey goaltender (born 1991)

- Born: August 16, 1991 (age 35) Marlengo, Italy
- Height: 163 cm (5 ft 4 in)
- Position: Goaltender
- Catches: Left
- Played for: HC Eagles Bolzano; EV Bozen Eagles; St. Lawrence Saints; HC Lugano Ladies; HC Varese
- National team: Italy
- Playing career: 2005–present

Giulia Mazzocchi (born 16 August 1991) is an Italian ice hockey goaltender and former member of the Italian national team. She most recently played in the 2023–24 season of the Italian Hockey League Women (IHLW) with HC Varese.

She was named Best Goaltender by the directorate of the Group B tournament of the 2018 IIHF Women's World Championship Division I.

== Playing career ==
Mazzocchi began her elite career in 2005 with HC Eagles Bolzano, playing in both the Serie A Femminile (renamed Italian Hockey League Women—IHLW in 2017) and the Elite Women's Hockey League (EWHL; renamed European Women's Hockey League in 2019). When HC Eagles Bolzano folded in 2008, she joined the newly established EV Bozen Eagles, with whom she continued playing in the IHLW and EWHL.

Her college ice hockey career was played with the St. Lawrence Saints women's ice hockey program in the ECAC Hockey conference of the NCAA Division I during 2012 to 2015.

In 2016, Mazzocchi signed in the Swiss Women's Hockey League A (SWHL A; renamed Women's League—PFWL in 2019) with HC Lugano Ladies, an independent women's club that was not associated with HC Lugano at that time. She played with the team until 2021.

After stepping away from elite club competition for a few seasons, Mazzocchi played a limited number of games with HC Varese in the 2023–24 season of the IHLW.
