= Royal Spanish Winter Sports Federation =

Spanish sports federation

The Royal Spanish Winter Sports Federation (Real Federación Española de Deportes de Invierno (RFEDI) in (in Spanish)) is the winter sports federation for Spain. Part of the Spanish Olympic Committee (COE), it deals with all federations conducting sports for the Winter Olympics. RFEDI is member of the International Ski and Snowboard Federation (FIS) and International Biathlon Union (IBU).

== Disciplines ==
- Alpine skiing
- Nordic combined
- Cross-country skiing
- Ski jumping
- Freestyle skiing
- Snowboarding
- Biathlon

== See also ==
- Spanish Ice Sports Federation
