= Ena Nystrøm =

Norwegian ice hockey player (born 2000)

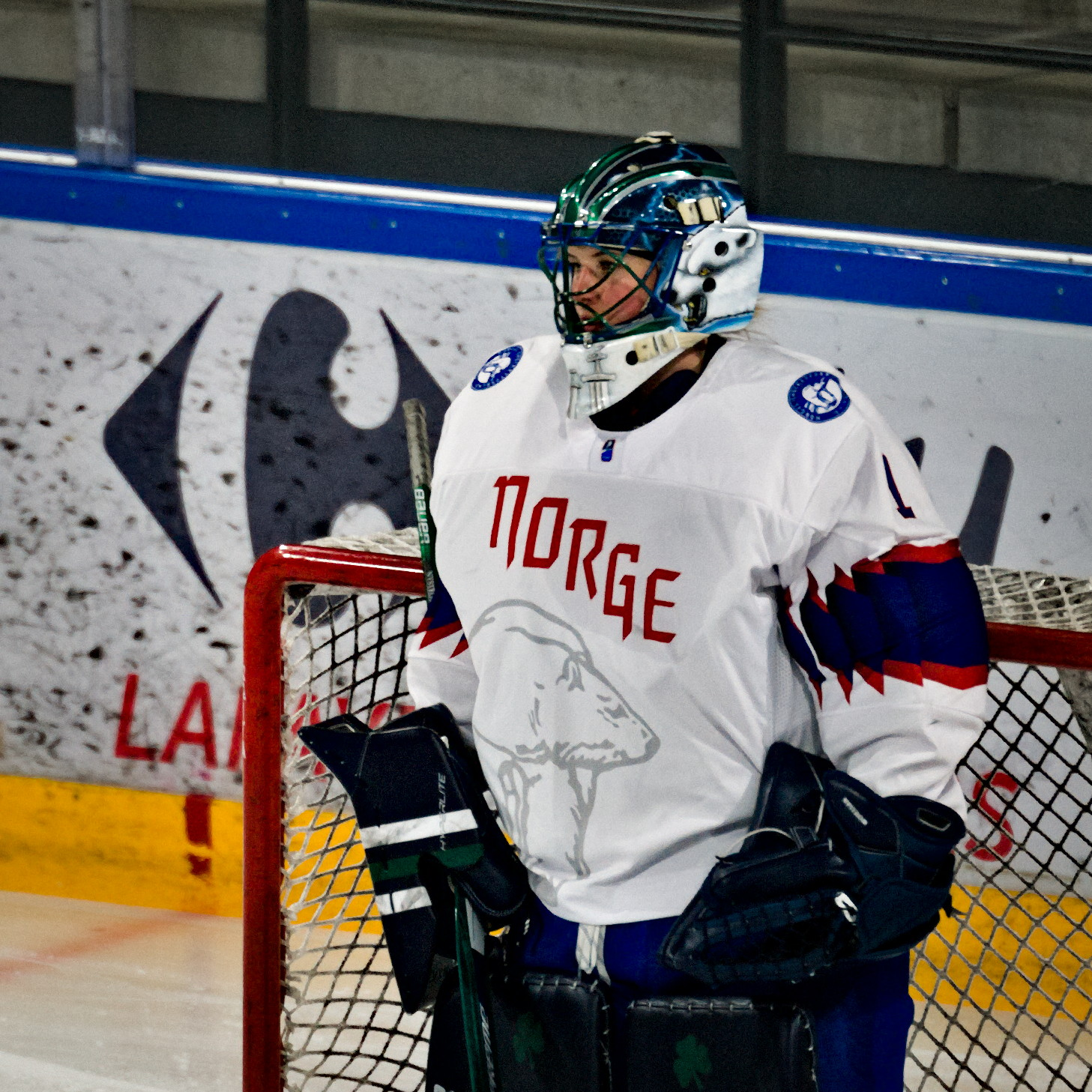
- Nystrøm representing Norway at the 2022 World Championship D1A
- Born: 28 April 2000 (age 26) Stavanger, Norway
- Height: 177 cm (5 ft 10 in)
- Position: Goaltender
- Catches: Left
- SDHL team Former teams: Brynäs IF: Mercyhurst Lakers; RPI Engineers; Stavanger Oilers
- National team: Norway
- Playing career: 2013–present

Ena Marie Eristland Nystrøm (born 28 April 2000) is a Norwegian ice hockey goaltender and member of the Norwegian national ice hockey team. She plays in the Swedish Women's Hockey League (SDHL) with Brynäs IF on contract through the 2024–25 season.

== Playing career ==
Beginning in 2013, Nystrøm played with teams of the Stavanger Oilers ice hockey club in her home town of Stavanger, Norway. In 2018, she left Norway to move to Canada, where she spent a year playing at the Ontario Hockey Academy in Cornwall, Ontario.

In 2019, she began her college ice hockey career with the RPI Engineers women's ice hockey program in the ECAC Hockey conference of the NCAA Division I. She finished the season with a respectable .915 save percentage but the team struggled in front of her and she amassed a 0-21-1 record. She was named ECAC Goaltender of the Week in October 2019.

Nystrøm transferred to Mercyhurst University and joined the Mercyhurst Lakers women‘s ice hockey program in the College Hockey America (CHA) conference prior to the 2020–21 season. She earned the first win of her collegiate career against the Robert Morris Colonials on 2 February and recorded a season-high 43 saves in a 5–2 victory over the Syracuse Orange on 5 February.

== International play ==
Nystrøm took part in the opening ceremony of the 2016 Winter Youth Olympics in Lillehammer.

In 2017, she was the starting goalie for Norway as they failed to qualify for the Olympics.

Nystrøm was selected as Best Goaltender by the directorate at both the 2018 IIHF Women's World Championship Division I and 2019 IIHF Women's World Championship Division I, with Norway winning bronze in 2019. She was also selected as Best Goaltender by the directorate at the 2018 IIHF U18 Women's World Championship Division I Group A.

== Awards and honors ==
- Best Goaltender as selected by the directorate, 2019 IIHF Women's World Championship Division I Group A
