= Josefine Persson =

Danish ice hockey player

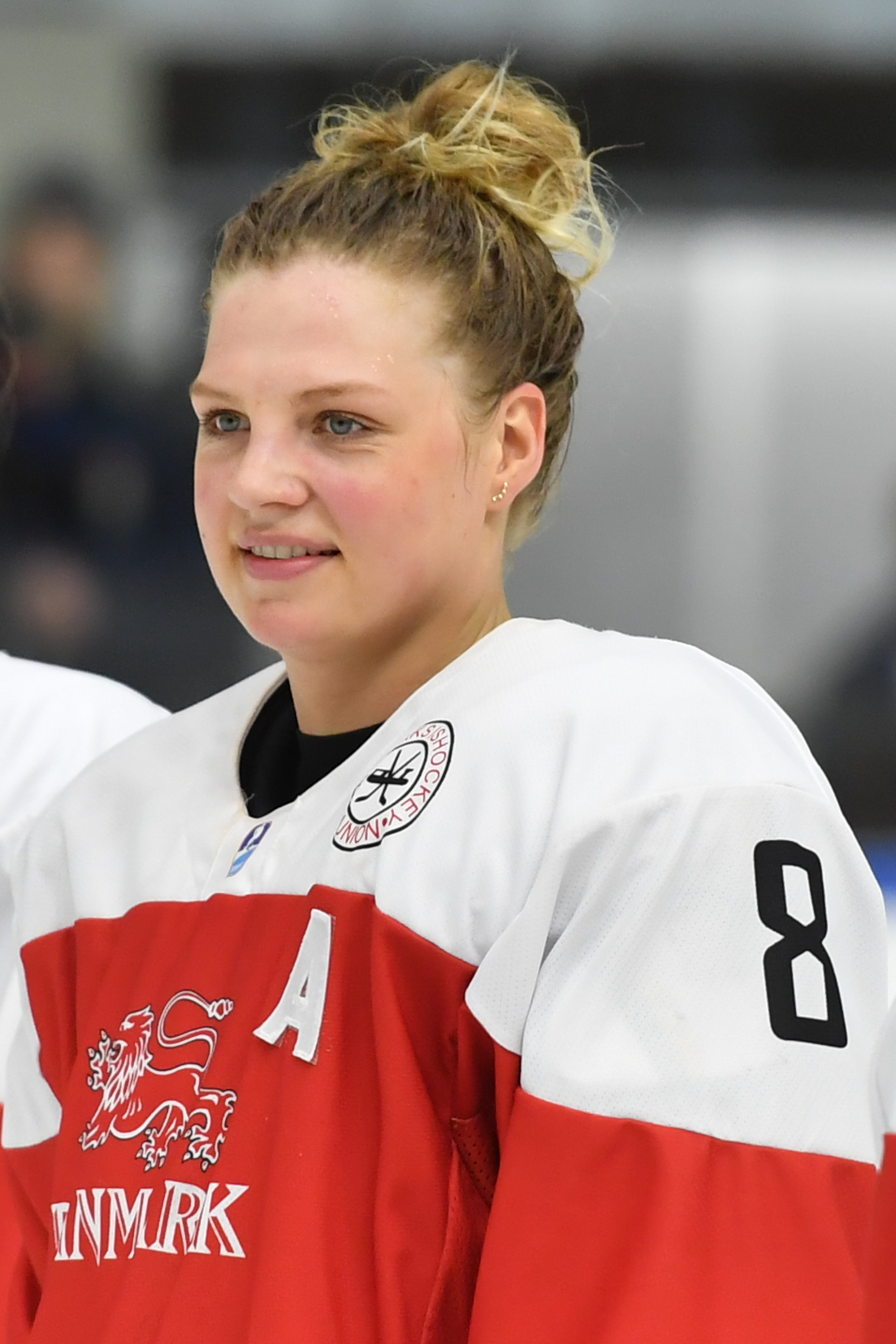
- Høegh Persson representing Denmark at the 2017 IIHF Women's World Championship Division I
- Born: 28 March 1994 (age 32) Copenhagen, Denmark
- Height: 1.78 m (5 ft 10 in)
- Weight: 75 kg (165 lb; 11 st 11 lb)
- Position: Wing
- Shoots: Left
- SDHL team Former teams: Luleå HF/MSSK; AIK IF; Hvidovre IK; Rødovre IK
- National team: Denmark
- Playing career: 2005–present

Josefine Høegh Persson (born 28 March 1994) is a Danish ice hockey player and member of the Danish national ice hockey team, currently playing with Luleå HF/MSSK of the Swedish Women's Hockey League (SDHL). She was named the Danish Women's Ice Hockey Player of the Year in 2014.

Høegh Persson has represented Denmark at every IIHF Women's World Championship since making her national team debut at the 2011 IIHF World Championship Division II. She led the Danish team in assists and ranked second on the team for points at the 2019 IIHF Women's World Championship Division IA, playing a key part in Denmark earning promotion to the Top Division for the first time since 1992. Høegh Persson scored Denmark's first goal of the 2021 IIHF Women's World Championship in Calgary.
