= Drofiny =

Drofiny Дрофиный
- Settlement
- Location within Astrakhan Oblast Location within Russia
- Coordinates: 46°18′N 46°41′E
- Country: Russia
- Region: Astrakhan Oblast
- District: Narimanovsky District
- Time zone: UTC+4:00

Drofiny (Russian: Дрофиный) is a rural locality (a settlement) in Prikaspiysky Selsoviet, Narimanovsky District, Astrakhan Oblast, Russia. The population was 132 as of 2010. There are 2 streets.

== Geography ==
Drofiny is located 146 km southwest of Narimanov (the district's administrative centre) by road. Saygachny and Kovylny are the nearest rural localities.
