= List of winless seasons =

Seasons where a sports team finishes a season without winning a game

A winless season is a regular season in which a sports team fails to win any of its games. The antithesis of a perfect season, winless seasons have been suffered twelve times in professional American football, six times in arena football, three times in professional Canadian football, once each in American professional lacrosse and box lacrosse, more than twenty-five times in major Australian football leagues, over twenty times in top-level rugby league, at least twice in top-level rugby union, and twice in English county cricket.

== Gridiron football ==
Because of the relatively small number of games played in college and professional football seasons, there is a possibility that a particularly inept team will not manage to win any games. Before overtime in the regular season was instituted, teams might tie a game without winning a game; these are still counted in lists of winless seasons. This is because, during eras before overtime was introduced to American football, leagues generally ignored tied games when calculating winning percentage.

Because NFL teams do not all play one another each season, it is possible for multiple teams to go winless (or also, for that matter, to go undefeated in the regular season). This was common in the NFL's early years as scheduling was not standardized and teams entered and left the league regularly. Since 1935, multiple simultaneous winless seasons has only happened once, in 1944 when both Brooklyn and Card-Pitt finished 0–10 in a season where rosters had been decimated (and parity disrupted) by wartime enlistments.

=== National Football League ===
==== 8 or more games ====
Year	Team	Wins	Losses	Ties	Strength of Schedule	Remarks
2017	Cleveland Browns	0	16	0	0.520	19-game winless streak, beginning with a loss to the Pittsburgh Steelers in the final game of the 2016 NFL season and ending with a victory over the New York Jets in Week 3 of the 2018 season. Ties the 2008 Detroit Lions for most losses in a single season. Coincidentally, both had perfect 4–0 preseasons. First NFL franchise to have multiple seasons with 15 or more losses, going 1–31 over two seasons, with their only win in week 16 of the 2016 season. The team would not record its next win until week 3 of the 2018 season, and would go 1–35–1 between their three wins through four seasons, resulting in consecutive 17 game losing streaks; this is also the most recent winless season and last under the 16-game schedule.
2008	Detroit Lions	0	16	0	0.559	20-game winless streak, beginning with a loss against the Green Bay Packers in the final week of the 2007 NFL season and ending with a win against the Washington Redskins (now Commanders) in Week 3 of the 2009 NFL season. Combined with a 1–7 finish from 2007, a 2–14 season in 2009, and a 2–10 start in 2010, Detroit went 5–45 from Week 9 of the 2007 season until Week 13 of the 2010 season. Detroit was the first non-expansion team to lose every game in a full season since World War II. This was their second winless season in franchise history (1942, see below). With this season, the Lions became only the second NFL franchise with two full winless seasons, and the only one still in existence; this was also the first winless season since the institution of the 16-game schedule in 1978 (that was used until 2020).
1982	Baltimore Colts	0	8	1	0.648	Strike-shortened season; seven weeks (out of 16) of the schedule were cancelled as a result.
1976	Tampa Bay Buccaneers	0	14	0	0.520	Debut season; also lost the first twelve games of the 1977 season to start 0–26 as a franchise.
1960	Dallas Cowboys	0	11	1	0.540	Debut season; lost twice by two points in first half of season. Tie was in the eleventh game against the New York Giants at Yankee Stadium.
1944	Brooklyn Tigers	0	10	0	0.645	Suspended operations after the season, and did not return to the league after World War II ended.
1944	Card-Pitt	0	10	0	0.650	Merger between Chicago Cardinals and the Pittsburgh Steelers due to player shortages during World War II.
1943	Chicago Cardinals	0	10	0	0.595	If one includes the 1944 Card-Pitt team (see above), the Cardinals are the only NFL team to have back-to-back full seasons without a victory. (The league, however, considers Card-Pitt and the Cardinals to be separate franchises.) If the connection between Card-Pitt and the Cardinals is made, the team would have a 29-game losing streak (the most by an NFL team); between week 6 of the 1942 season and week 1 of the 1946 season, the Cardinals and Card-Pitt teams posted a combined 1–36 record.
1942	Detroit Lions	0	11	0	0.541	This was the first NFL season during U.S. involvement in World War II, leading to a depletion of the player talent pool. There were talks of suspending play. However, it was ultimately decided to continue operations to boost morale on the home front.
1934	Cincinnati Reds	0	8	0	0.608	Folded before the season was over.
1925	Columbus Tigers	0	9	0	0.649	First franchise with more than one full winless season (the Tigers folded after the 1926 campaign).
1922	Columbus Panhandles	0	8	0	0.531	

The Rochester Jeffersons went a combined 0–21–2 from 1922 to 1925, but played only partial NFL schedules in those years (0–4–1, 0–4, 0–7 and 0–6–1, respectively). They also had another winless season in 1911 going 0–1–3 in the New York Pro Football League.

The New Orleans Saints came close to a winless season in 1980. The team lost their first 14 games and finished with a 1–15 record. Their only win was in week 15 when they won by a single point. The Indianapolis Colts had a similar scare in 1991, winning their only game by a single point after starting the season 0–9. Coincidentally, both teams avoided a winless season by defeating the New York Jets at the Jets' home field (Shea Stadium in 1980, Giants Stadium in 1991) by a one-point margin of victory.

==== 7 games or fewer ====
Year	Team	Wins	Losses	Ties	Strength of schedule	Remarks
1929	Dayton Triangles	0	6	0	0.656	Dayton's final season. The third of three consecutive winless seasons for Dayton. Their final win was in 1927; they then consecutively went 0–18–1, losing every game in their final two seasons.
1928	Dayton Triangles	0	7	0	0.625	The second winless season for Dayton.
1927	Buffalo Bisons	0	5	0	0.456	The Bisons consecutively went 0–13–2 through a three-season span.
1926	Hammond Pros	0	4	0	0.537	The second winless season for Hammond.
1926	Louisville Colonels	0	4	0	0.546	Louisville changed their name from the Brecks to the Colonels making this the franchise's third winless season and going 1–12–0 in their four seasons.
1925	Rochester Jeffersons	0	6	1	0.609	The fourth consecutive winless season for the Jeffersons. They went 0–21–2 through this span.
1925	Dayton Triangles	0	7	1	0.663	
1925	Duluth Kelleys	0	3	0	0.621	
1925	Milwaukee Badgers	0	6	0	0.708	
1924	Kenosha Maroons	0	4	1	0.612	Only season.
1924	Minneapolis Marines	0	6	0	0.650	Consecutively went 0–9–2 through a three-season span.
1924	Rochester Jeffersons	0	7	0	0.594	The third consecutive winless season for the Jeffersons.
1923	Louisville Brecks	0	3	0	0.544	The second winless season for Louisville in their third season, and only having one win in the previous season.
1923	Rochester Jeffersons	0	4	0	0.550	The second consecutive winless season for the Jeffersons.
1922	Evansville Crimson Giants	0	3	0	0.567	
1922	Rochester Jeffersons	0	4	1	0.590	
1922	Hammond Pros	0	4	1	0.526	
1921	Tonawanda Kardex	0	1	0	0.400	Only NFL season.
1921	Muncie Flyers	0	2	0	0.444	The second winless season in a row. The Flyers finished their NFL franchise record as 0–3.
1921	Louisville Brecks	0	2	0	0.285	
1921	New York Brickley Giants	0	2	0	0.650	Only season.
1920	Muncie Flyers	0	1	0	0.700	

=== Arena football ===
The previously shorter length of seasons in arena football made imperfect seasons quite possible. The following teams went through an Arena Football League or a National Arena League season without winning a game:

Year	Team	Played	Remarks	League
1989	Maryland Commandos	4	Only year branded as the Maryland Commandos.	AFL
1991	Columbus Thunderbolts	10	Moved to Cleveland the following year.	AFL
1992	New Orleans Night	10	Team ceased operations after season.	AFL
1994	Milwaukee Mustangs	12	First winless team to remain in same city during following season. Went 10–4 in 1996. Folded in 2001.	AFL
1996	Memphis Pharaohs	14	Relocated twice, firstly as the Portland Forest Dragons from 1997 and then as the Oklahoma Wranglers. Folded in 2001.	AFL
2003	Carolina Cobras	16	Went 6–10 the following season. Folded in 2004.	AFL
2018	Lehigh Valley Steelhawks	15	Only team in the league to be winless. Was 9–1 the season before and 2nd in the league. Folded after the season.	NAL

In 2001, the Columbus Wardogs of AF2, the minor league of the AFL, made history becoming the first American football team to go 0–16.

=== United Football Leagues ===
The United Football League of 2009 to 2012 had one winless season. In their inaugural season, the 2009 New York Sentinels lost all six of their games. The team, which was a traveling team that played games in Hartford, Long Island and New Jersey (and had intended to play a game in New York City but backed out), fired its head coach and settled permanently in Hartford to become the Hartford Colonials. Under the UFL's double round robin format, only one team could finish any particular season entirely with losses, since every team played each other at least twice.

The United Football League of 2024 has had no winless seasons to date, nor did its immediate predecessors. It has had one team, the 2025 Memphis Showboats, that failed to win any games in regulation (though the team won two overtime games).

=== World League of American Football ===
The 1991 inaugural season of the World League of American Football saw the Raleigh-Durham Skyhawks fold after losing all ten of their regular-season games. The following year, the WLAF replaced that franchise with the Ohio Glory who almost met the same fate but managed one win in their lone season.

=== Other American football leagues ===
Since non-professional, semi-professional, and minor league teams are inherently unstable in their membership, it is far easier for seasons in which a team wins no games to occur. In the case of non-professional teams, neither mechanisms to force a team to shut down against its will, nor effective drafts or revenue sharing mechanisms to distribute talent evenly among teams typically exist, leading to poor teams accumulating multiple winless seasons. The Vancouver Kats of the minor professional Northwest International Football League scored no points in nine games, all of them losses, and left their league midway through their lone season in 1965; they did score points in one non-league game, but this was against the Simon Fraser Clansmen, a college football team that played under the amateur requirements of the NAIA, and the Kats still lost that contest, 19–14. Four teams in football history have both lost all their games and failed to score a single point in an entire season; all played eight games or less. The 1938 Clintonville Four Wheel Drive Truckers failed to score a point in a nine-game season but managed two 0–0 ties. There are at least twelve teams who have accumulated losing streaks of 20 games or more; there are also four teams who have accumulated seasons of all losses with at least 13 games. In the case of minor professional football, particularly in indoor football leagues, winless seasons often result from an owner's abandonment or other financial hardship. The American Indoor Football Association had at least one winless team in five out of six seasons. The National Indoor Football League went its first three seasons without a winless season, but beginning in 2004, at least one team went winless every year until the league's collapse in 2007. Though the Spring Football League had two teams with winless seasons (the Los Angeles Dragons and the Miami Tropics), and the Stars Football League had one such team (the traveling 2011 Michigan Coyotes), they are almost never mentioned in discussions of perfect and perfectly bad seasons, since those teams only played two games each before the seasons were cut short.

AF2 was the minor league of the Arena Football League. In 2001, the Columbus Wardogs made history becoming the first American football team to finish a season 0–16.

The Legends Football League (originally Lingerie Football League), whose seasons are only three to four games long for each team, has had eight teams with perfectly bad seasons in three years of play. One such team, the Toronto Triumph, did not win a game in their inaugural season.

The Princeton Tigers sprint football squad, a team consisting of players under 172 pounds, sustained 16 consecutive winless seasons before Princeton University shut the team down in 2015, citing safety concerns in allowing players to play on a team so heavily outmatched.

In the American Football League Europe (AFLE), the Firenze Red Lions finished their only season with a winless 0–12 record. On 4 November 2026, the AFLE unexpectedly parted ways with the Red Lions, with Guelfi Firenze replacing them.

=== Canadian Football League ===
Since 1986, the Canadian Football League's regular season spans eighteen games; from 1952 to 1985 it was generally sixteen games like the NFL from 1978 to 2020, though those teams in what is now the Eastern Division played only fourteen as late as 1973. Also, the CFL did not adopt interdivisional regular season play until the early 1960s. There have been no imperfect seasons since the CFL was officially founded in 1958 (the closest any CFL team has come to a winless season since its formation are the 2003 Hamilton Tiger-Cats and 2026 Ottawa Redblacks who both went 1–17; however, there have been three other seasons in which a team won a single game under shorter standard regular season schedules since 1958) – the last imperfect season in either of the CFL's antecedent leagues was in 1949.

Imperfect seasons were common in the Canadian football during the first half of the twentieth century when fewer games were played and more leagues were challenging for the Grey Cup. There was also far more disparity between teams in early Canadian football leagues.

Also unlike the NFL, the CFL has always awarded "points" in the standings that, in effect, have always counted ties as "half-wins" so a team with only ties and losses in the standings has never been regarded as having an imperfect season.

==== Teams with winless seasons in the WIFU, IRFU and CFL since 1935 ====
Year	Team	Games	Wins	Losses	Ties	Comments
1949	Hamilton Wildcats	12	0	12	0	Merged with the Hamilton Tigers for 1950 season
1946	Hamilton Wildcats	12	0	10	2	
1941	Montreal Royals	6	0	6	0	Did not resume when Canadian football recommenced after World War II; succeeded by the Montreal Alouettes.
1939	Montreal Royals	6	0	5	1	
1938	Edmonton Eskimos	8	0	8	0	
1938	Montreal Royals	6	0	6	0	

== National Pro Grid League ==
The National Pro Grid League, which operated from 2014 to 2016, has a season of 3 to 4 games per team plus a 4 to 8 team playoff. The Los Angeles Reign lost all ten games it played during the league's (and team's) three-year existence.

=== NPGL teams with no wins in a season (based on NPGL site) ===
Season	Team	Games	Wins	Losses	Comments
2016	Los Angeles Reign	3	0	3	
2015	Baltimore Anthem	3	0	3	Debut season
2015	Los Angeles Reign	3	0	3	
2014	Boston Iron	2	0	2	
2014	Philadelphia Founders	3	0	3	Folded after the 2014 season.
2014	Los Angeles Reign	4	0	4	Including one playoff loss.

== Lacrosse ==
Seasons in the National Lacrosse League and its predecessors Major Indoor Lacrosse League and Eagle Pro Box Lacrosse League have varied from eight games in the first years of competition to eighteen games today, with the extension having been gradual. The Charlotte Cobras, who played only one season before folding, are the only team in the history of the NLL to have not won a game in a season. In their sole 1996 season they played 12 games and lost them all, before folding.

In Major League Lacrosse, the season consisted of either 12 or 14 games from the league's formation in 2001 through the 2019 season. The 2020 season, the last before MLL merged into the Premier Lacrosse League, was abbreviated due to the COVID-19 pandemic. During the existence of the MLL, two teams recorded winless seasons—the 2006 Chicago Machine, who went 0–12 and lost an MLL record 13 consecutive games, and by the 2020 New York Lizards, who went 0–5 in the shortened season.

PLL has never had a team record a completely winless season since its formation in 2019; only one team has recorded a winless regular season. During the 2020 season, also abbreviated by COVID-19, Chaos LC went 0–4 in the regular season, but won two games in the league's Championship Series (i.e., playoffs) before losing in the final to Whipsnakes LC.

== Other North American leagues ==
In the other major professional sports leagues of North America it is virtually impossible that a team could lose all its games, for the simple reason that there are many more games in the regular season than in football or lacrosse.

=== Major League Soccer ===
The Major League Soccer schedule has consisted of between 26 and 34 games. No team in Major League Soccer has ever come close to losing all its games: the most losses in a MLS season is 24 from 32 games by the Kansas City Wizards, now known as Sporting Kansas City, in 1999, the year when the league used shootouts to decide all tied games. Shootouts were abandoned the following season. In 2013, D.C. United set new MLS records in futility. United won a league-low 3 games, and lost a record 24 games, tying the aforementioned Wizards.

=== National Basketball Association ===
Since the 1967–68 season, the National Basketball Association's standard regular season schedule has been 82 games long (except the 1998–99, 2011–12, 2019–20, and 2020–21 seasons were shortened, though all were at least 50 games).

The 2011–12 Charlotte Bobcats hold the record for the lowest winning percentage of any team in an NBA season, winning only 7 out of 66 games in a lockout-shortened season, for a winning percentage of 0.106. This broke the record held by the 1972–73 Philadelphia 76ers, who had a winning percentage of .110 in a full 82-game season. The 1947–48 Providence Steamrollers won an all-time NBA low of six games out of 48 (.125 winning percentage).

The 1953–54 Baltimore Bullets went 0–20 on the road. More recently, the 1990–91 Sacramento Kings managed a near-imperfect road season, winning only one of 41 away games. Overall, the Kings lost 43 consecutive road games before beating the Orlando Magic 95–93 on November 23, 1991.

==== Women's National Basketball Association ====
Since its formation in 1997, the WNBA regular season has been gradually increased from 30 to the current 40-game schedule to be used starting in 2023.

No team has gone through a WNBA season without winning a game; the fewest wins in a WNBA season has been 2 by the 2020 New York Liberty during the WNBA bubble season. The record was previously tied at 3 wins by the 1998 Washington Mystics in their first season, and the 2011 Tulsa Shock. Two other expansion WNBA teams, the 2008 Atlanta Dream at 4–30 and the 2006 Chicago Sky at 5–29, have come close to this record.

==== United States Basketball League ====
The Atlantic City Seagulls of the (now defunct) summertime, minor league USBL finished the 2001 season with an 0–28 record. It was quite a turnaround for the franchise, as they were dominant in the USBL just a few years earlier; the Seagulls were USBL runners-up in 1996, then swept to three straight titles in 1997–99. In 2000, the Seagulls slipped to 12–18, fourth place, and were beaten in the first round of the playoffs; after their winless 2001 campaign, the Seagulls folded.

=== National Hockey League ===
The National Hockey League's schedule, like that of the NBA, consists of 82 games. Since the 2004–05 lockout, teams receive two points for a win, one point for a loss in overtime or a shootout, and zero points for a loss in regulation time. From 1997 until 2004, teams received two points for a win, one point for a tie or overtime loss, and zero points for a regulation loss. Prior to 1997, teams received two points for a win, one point for a tie, and no points for a loss.

No team has ever come close to losing every game in an NHL season; the worst record is by the 1974–75 Washington Capitals who, in their inaugural season, went 8–67–5 (8 wins, 67 losses, 5 ties). The 1974–75 Capitals and 1992–93 Ottawa Senators, both inaugural seasons, hold the record for fewest wins on the road with one. The NHL played an 80-game season in 1974–75, whereas in 1992–93 the schedule consisted of 84 games, thus giving the Senators the percentage record for worst road record. The Senators also set a record by losing their first 38 consecutive road games (the Senators' road statistics include a neutral site game played in Hamilton, Ontario, in which the Senators were considered the road team).

=== Major League Baseball ===
Since the early 1960s, the schedule of both leagues of Major League Baseball has been 162 games long, and before that it was 154 games long. With such a huge schedule, it is practically impossible for a team to finish with a winless season. The sabermetric baseball statistic Wins Above Replacement is calculated on the premise that even a team consisting entirely of replacement-level players, (i.e., a player that could be "replaced" by a call-up from the minor leagues without any significant statistical difference) is expected to win a baseline minimum number of games (typically 40–50, depending primarily on the caliber of the team's division) per 162-game season.

The closest to a perfectly winless season in the National League was the infamous 1899 Cleveland Spiders season, who finished with a record of 20–134 after its roster was looted by the owners of the team, who then stacked the best players onto the St. Louis Perfectos.

With a win percentage of .130, the Spiders are (as of 2020) the last of three major league teams to have finished a season below the Mendoza Line (.200) in win percentage for a minimum of 120 games; the others were the 1889 Louisville Colonels (.196), and the 1890 Pittsburgh Alleghenys (.169), whose best players had jumped to the Pittsburgh Burghers of the newly formed Player's League.

Since the establishment of the American League in 1901, the teams to have come closest to a perfectly winless season are the Philadelphia Athletics in 1916 (36–117), the Boston Braves in 1935 (38–115), the New York Mets in their 1962 inaugural season (40–120), the Detroit Tigers in 2003 (43–119), the Baltimore Orioles in 2018 (47–115), the Detroit Tigers in 2019 (47–114), the Oakland Athletics in 2023 (50–112), the Chicago White Sox in 2024 (41–121) and the Colorado Rockies in 2025 (43–119).

=== College basketball ===
Compared to the NBA, the college basketball season is shorter, with teams playing up to 40 games, divided into non-conference play, conference play (both regular season), conference tournaments, and postseason tournaments. Starting in 2020, Division I teams can either play 29 or 31 regular season games, with conference play ranging from 14 to 20 games. Better performing teams play more games by qualifying to conference and postseason tournaments.

==== Women's NCAA Division I ====
- Prairie View A&M 1991–92 (0–26)
- Centenary 1999–00 (0–28)
- Centenary 2000–01 (0–27)
- Chicago State 2016–17 (0–29)
- Delaware State 2021–22 (0–24)
- Saint Peter's 2022–23 (0–30)
- Valparaiso 2025–26 (0–32)

===== Women's NCAA Division III =====
- Centenary 2013–14 (0–24)
- Centenary 2014–15 (0–24)

==== Men's NCAA Division I ====
- Prairie View A&M University 1991–92 0–28
- Savannah St. 2004–05 0–29
- NJIT 2007–08 0–29
- Grambling 2012–13 0–28

== Association football ==
Only nine clubs are known to have completed a season with no victories or draws. Three of them were in their nation's top tier, with Real Kakamora losing all 15 of their matches in the 2019/20 Solomon Islands S-League and all 22 matches of the 2023 S-League, Maccabi Nes Tziona losing all 24 matches of the 1949–50 Israeli League, and Gibraltar Phoenix losing all 14 matches in the 2013–14 Gibraltar Premier Division. Kakamora are the only recorded top-flight club in the history of the sport to finish two seasons without registering a point. In lower divisions, Antigua Barracuda lost all 26 matches of the third-tier 2013 USL Pro season, while in the 2015–16 season, English non-league team Longford A.F.C., played a 30-game season in the Gloucestershire Northern Senior League Division Two (14th tier on the English pyramid), losing all their matches after the majority of their players and manager left. In 2016, Grêmio Barueri lost all 19 matches of the Campeonato Paulista Série A3, the third level of the São Paulo state championship. After the disastrous season, the Antigua and Grêmio Barueri teams folded. In the 2022–23 Scottish Women's Premier League, Glasgow Women F.C. lost all 32 of their matches. In the 2024–25 TFF 1. Lig, the second tier of Turkish football, Yeni Malatyaspor lost all 38 of their matches, with the team's request to withdraw from the league mid-season rejected by the Turkish Football Federation. In the 2025–26 FA Women's National League Southern Premier Division, the third tier of women's football in England, Billericay Town F.C. lost all 22 of their matches, scoring 5 goals and conceding 147.

In the 2010–11 Ukrainian Second League (3rd tier on the Ukrainian pyramid), FC Veres Rivne lost all 14 out of 22 scheduled games before being expelled from the league due to failure of payment of league dues; in addition, they failed to score a single goal at home.

In top-level domestic league football, however, a handful of teams have completed their respective seasons without winning a game. In the 2010–11 Serbian SuperLiga, FK Čukarički Stankom played an entire season winless, drawing five matches and losing 25 in a 30-game season, giving them only 5 points and finishing bottom in a field of 16. The team also only scored ten goals whilst conceding 65.

In the Bulgarian A Professional Football Group, which is the top tier of association football in the European country, three teams have all played a season without winning, with those being Torpedo Ruse (four draws out of 22 matches during 1951), Rakovski Ruse (one draw out of 30 matches during 1996/97) and Chernomorets Burgas Sofia (also one draw out of 30 matches during 2006/07). Chernomorets were however the worse performing out of these, conceding 131 goals with only eight in reply (the same number scored as Rakovski Ruse in their winless season), they still however completed the season with a minus 2 points total, because they violated a rule concerning not being able to field enough youth players.

In the 1946–47 Allsvenskan with 22 games played, Billingsfors IK tied 3 games and lost 19, the only team in Swedish football history never to win even one single Allsvenskan game in a season.

In the 1998–99 Alpha Ethniki, the football championship in Greece, Ethnikos Piraeus drew 8 games and lost 26 out of 34.

In the 1999 Thai Premier League, Bangkok Bank of Commerce ended the season with only two points from 22 matches. In the last fixture, they lost 0–10 to Royal Thai Air Force in a match that widely believed to be fixed as Royal Thai Air Force won the league by a single goal differential. Investigation led by the Football Association of Thailand had the manager and one of his assistants suspended. Bangkok Bank of Commerce got expelled from the association, and later folded due to financial difficulties. There was no punishment to Royal Thai Air Force or its personnel, however.

In the 1999–2000 Vyshcha Liha, the highest division of Ukrainian football championship, FC Zirka Kirovohrad tied 9 matches and lost 21 out of 30.

In the 2016 Thai Division 2 League Eastern Region, the third highest division of Thai football pyramid. TA Benchamarachuthit F.C. drew 5 matches and lost 17 out of 22 matches.

In the 2017–18 Scottish Championship, the second highest division of Scottish Football, Brechin City drew 4 matches and lost 32 out of 36 matches.

In the 2017–18 Gibraltar Premier Division, the highest division in Gilbraltar football championship, Manchester 62 drew 7 games and lost 20 out of 27.

In the 2018 Úrvalsdeild, the highest division in Icelandic football championship, Knattspyrnudeild Keflavík drew 4 games and lost 18 out of 22.

In the 2018–19 Football Superleague of Kosovo, the highest division in Kosovar football championship, KEK drew 1 game and lost 32 out of 33.

In the 2018–19 Campionato Sammarinese di Calcio, the football championship in San Marino, Virtus drew 2 games and lost 17 out of 19.

In the 2019–20 Slovenian PrvaLiga, the highest division in Slovenian football, Rudar Velenje drew 12 games and lost 24 out of 36, conceding a last-minute equaliser away to NK Bravo on the final day of the season.

In the 2022-23 Cymru Premier the highest division in Welsh football, Airbus UK Broughton drew 2 games and lost 30 out of 32 games, ending on −4 points after a points deduction.

In the 2024–25 Czech First League, the highest division in Czech football, České Budějovice drew 6 games and lost 29 out of 35.

In that same 2024–25 season, Moroccan football club SCC Mohammedia failed to win a single competitive match: they lost all 6 group stage matches in the 2024–25 Excellence Cup, were knocked out of the 2023–24 Throne Cup (played in 2024–25) in their first match, losing 6–2 to UTS Rabat, and in the 2024-25 Botola Pro, drew 4 and lost 26 out of 30 games, ending the season on a record low 4 points.

== Australian rules football ==
=== VFL/AFL ===
In the Australian Football League (until 1990 called the Victorian Football League), seasons have ranged from twelve games per team (in 1916, when only four teams competed due to World War I) to 22 games (since 1970, except for 1993 when 20 games were played), with most seasons being of 18 or 22 games duration.

Season	Team	Wins	Losses	Draws	Remarks
1897	St Kilda	0	14	0	Did not win a match until Round 1 of 1900
1898	St Kilda	0	17	0	
1899	St Kilda	0	17	0	VFL/AFL record low percentage of 23.2% (scored only 323 points and conceded 1,391)
1902	St Kilda	0	17	0	Full-forward Charlie Baker won the VFL Leading Goalkicker medal despite the team being winless
1913	University	0	18	0	Full-forward Roy Park won the VFL Leading Goalkicker medal despite the team being winless
1914	University	0	18	0	Dropped out of competition and folded at the end of the season; reformed in 1919 and have competed in amateur football since
1919	Melbourne	0	16	0	Melbourne's first season in the VFL after being in recess from 1916 to 1918 due to World War I
1926	North Melbourne	0	17	1	
1928	Hawthorn	0	18	0	
1931	North Melbourne	0	18	0	
1934	North Melbourne	0	18	0	
1950	Hawthorn	0	18	0	
1964	Fitzroy	0	18	0	

=== AFLW ===
In the AFL Women's competition, seasons have ranged from six games per team (in 2020, when the season was initially scheduled for eight games each but was cut short due to the COVID-19 pandemic) to ten games (in 2022).

Season	Team	Wins	Losses	Draws	Remarks
2020	Richmond	0	6	0	First season in the league. Season was prematurely ended due to the COVID-19 pandemic.
2021	Gold Coast	0	9	0	
2022 (S7)	Sydney	0	10	0	First season in the league. The AFL acknowledged an umpiring error cost Sydney a potential match-winning goal in their four-point loss to Essendon.

=== SANFL ===
In the South Australian National Football League, season length has varied from twelve games to 22. Since 2015, teams have played 18 games per season.

Season	Team	Wins	Losses	Draws	Remarks
1898	West Adelaide	0	14	0	First season in SAFL.
1906	West Adelaide	0	12	0	
1908	Sturt	0	12	0	
1909	South Adelaide	0	12	0	
1921	Glenelg	0	14	0	First season in SAFL; did not record first win until Round 1 of 1925.
1922	Glenelg	0	14	0	
1923	Glenelg	0	14	0	
1924	Glenelg	0	14	0	
1926	South Adelaide	0	13	1	
1933	West Adelaide	0	17	0	
1948	South Adelaide	0	17	0	
1950	South Adelaide	0	17	0	
1964	Central District	0	20	0	First season in SANFL.
1995	Sturt	0	22	0	

=== WAFL ===
The West Australian Football League has existed within Western Australia under various names since 1885, and until the 1980s was of equivalent standard to the VFL and SANFL. Its season was originally around six to nine games in length, later increasing to 21 games, and from 2018 is 18 games.^{[a]} However, in 2020 each team played only 8 home-and-away games due to the COVID-19 pandemic delaying the start until July.

Season	Team	Wins	Losses	Draws	Remarks
1899	Rovers	0	8	0	Folded during season; Perth played the remaining fixtures.
1902	Subiaco	0	15	0	
1905	Subiaco	0	10	0	Played fewer games than rival league clubs due to financial difficulties.
1917	Midland Junction	0	12	0	Disbanded at end of season.
1999	Peel	0	20	0	
2020	Peel	0	8	0	COVID-19-shortened season

=== VFA/VFL ===
==== 1897–1995 ====
From the time of the formation of the Victorian Football League in 1896 until it was dissolved in 1995, the VFA was the second-tier club competition in Victoria. Its home-and-away season varied erratically from 12 to 22 games in length.

Season	Team	Wins	Losses	Draws	VFA Division	Remarks
1898	Brunswick	0	15	0	Single	
1903	Essendon Town	0	18	0	Single	
1904	Preston	0	18	0	Single	
1910	Preston	0	18	0	Single	
1912	Melbourne City	0	18	0	Single	First season in the VFA.
1913	Melbourne City	0	18	0	Single	Folded at the end of the season.
1941	Sandringham	0	18	0	Single	Conceded then-record score of 43.29 (287).
1951	Box Hill	0	19	1	Single	First season in VFA.
1961	Brighton	0	18	0	Second	Nearly folded at the end of the season before reforming as Brighton-Caulfield.
1973	Box Hill	0	18	0	Second	
1977	Box Hill	0	18	0	Second	
1981	Sunshine	0	18	0	Second	
1983	Waverley	0	18	0	First	
1986	Camberwell	0	18	0	First	
1986	Mordialloc	0	18	0	Second	
1989	Camberwell	0	18	0	Single	Defeated Sunshine in Round 4, but Sunshine dropped out of the VFA and folded after eight games, with their record being expunged.
1990	Camberwell	0	18	0	Single	Dropped out of the VFA and folded before the start of the following season.
1993	Coburg	0	18	0	Single	Lost 29 consecutive matches between 1992 and 1994.
1995	Williamstown	0	16	0	Single	

==== 1996–present ====
After 1995, the VFA was replaced by the current Victorian Football League (VFL), which serves as a state league and feeder to the AFL.

Season	Team	Wins	Losses	Draws	Remarks
2001	Bendigo	0	20	0	
2002	Bendigo	0	19	1	
2009	Bendigo	0	18	0	
2013	Bendigo	0	18	0	
2014	Bendigo	0	18	0	Dropped out of league and folded at the end of the season.
2015	Frankston	0	18	0	
2023	Coburg	0	18	0	

== Basketball ==
Domestic basketball leagues outside of North American professional basketball have shorter seasons, typically a home-and-away regular season, with the top teams qualifying to the playoffs. Some other teams still play in continental tournaments outside of their domestic leagues, while most still play other domestic competitions.

=== British Basketball League ===
In 2013, Mersey Tigers became the first top-flight British basketball team to go a whole season winless.

This record of 0–33 in the regular season of the 2012–13 BBL Championship, was completed with a 90–57 loss away to Glasgow Rocks, but can also be extended to include their complete season of 0–35 (defeats in the first round of the BBL Cup and BBL Trophy).

The defeat in the BBL Trophy was also significant because they fell at this stage to EBL Division One side, Worthing Thunder, and in doing so, it was the first time a BBL side had been knocked out from a competition by an EBL team.

They also currently hold the longest losing streak of 34 consecutive defeats in the BBL Championship.

=== EuroLeague ===
The EuroLeague, the top continental basketball league in Europe, has had seen numerous tournament format changes. Starting in the 2016–17 EuroLeague, each team has played 30 regular season games, with each team playing every team. From 2000 to 2016, teams were split into groups, and played 10 teams starting when ULEB handled the league. From 1991 to 1996, FIBA expanded the original competition and had a 14-game regular season. From 1996 to 2000, there were two group stages, each with 10 games each. These are the teams that finished winless in the regular season stage since 1991 (excluding 1996 to 2000):

- 1993–94 Guilford Kings (0–14)
- 2001–02 London Towers (0–14)
- 1997–98 FC Porto (0–16)

=== National Basketball League (Australia) ===
The National Basketball League (Australia) has played from 18 games in its first season, later increased to 33, and then reduced to the current 28 games. Only the 1988 Geelong Supercats lost all 24 of their regular season games.

=== Philippine Basketball Association ===
Unlike basketball leagues elsewhere, the Philippine Basketball Association (PBA) usually play 3 tournaments (or "conferences") in sequence. Each team usually plays the other teams at least once in a conference, so the minimum number of games a team plays depends on how many teams there are, historically 8 to 10, but now currently 12. No team has lost all of its games in every conference in a season, although there are instances that a team did lost all of its games in a conference. These are, from 1981 and excluding guest teams:

- 1982 U/Tex Wranglers in the PBA Invitational championship (0–4)
  - Not all teams are invited in the Invitational championship.
- 1984 Country Fair Hotdogs in the PBA Second All-Filipino Conference (0–11)
  - As all teams qualified to the playoffs, Country Fair lost two more games to end up with a 0–13 record.
- 1990 Pepsi Hotshots in the PBA Third Conference (0–10)
  - Pepsi finished 2–28 (0.067 winning percentage), winning once in each of the other 2 conferences, the worst end-of-season record in the PBA.
- 1995 Ginebra San Miguel in the PBA Governors' Cup (0–10)
- 1999 Pop Cola 800s in the PBA Governors' Cup (0–8)
- 2011 Air21 Express in the PBA Governors' Cup (0–8)
- 2011–12 Shopinas.com Clickers in the PBA Philippine Cup (0–14)
  - Air21 and Shopinas.com's winless runs came at consecutive conferences.
- 2014–15 Blackwater Elite in the PBA Philippine Cup (0–11)
- 2017 Kia Picanto in the PBA Governors' Cup (0–11)
- 2021 Blackwater Bossing in the PBA Philippine Cup (0–11)
  - In addition, Blackwater earlier lost eight consecutive in the previous conference, breaking the record of the PBA's losing streak at 19.

== Cricket ==
=== County cricket ===
In English first-class county cricket, which has a history dating back to the early nineteenth century and was until the middle twentieth century up to the highest standard of the game, seasons have varied in length. Before the 1880s, they were generally less than ten matches in length and some "first-class" counties played only against one or two different opponents, so that a team losing all its games was not uncommon. Between 1887 and 1929, seasons were gradually increased in length to a standard twenty-eight matches for all counties. However, because of the development and popularity of one-day cricket, seasons have been reduced to twenty-four games in 1969 and twenty in 1972, though this was increased by two in 1977 and 1983. With an increase to four days for all games, sixteen or seventeen games have been played since 1993.

Also, because of improvements to pitches via the heavy roller and covering to protect from rain, the proportion of games "drawn" (not finished) has steadily risen since the 1870s.

Only two county teams have ever finished a season with only losses in a program of eight or more games:

English First-Class County Teams Losing Every Game (qualification 8 or more games)
Season	Team	Wins	Losses	Draws	Remarks
1884	Derbyshire	0	10	0	Won only three games from 1884 to 1887; Lost every game in 1887, but played only six games
1920	Derbyshire	0	17	0	One match, against Nottinghamshire, was abandoned without a ball bowled

Teams losing or drawing every game in a first-class county season have been rather less exceptional, though by no means frequent:

Other English First-Class County Teams with No Wins in a Season (qualification 8 or more games)
Season	Team	Wins	Losses	Draws	Remarks
1865	Yorkshire	0	6	2	Were to have an amazing rise due to the discovery of deadly fast bowlers Freeman and Emmett, winning every game in 1867.
1871	Surrey	0	9	4	
1877	Sussex	0	7	1	
1886	Derbyshire	0	8	1	Was demoted from first-class status between 1888 and 1893
1897	Derbyshire	0	9	7	Lost two games by one wicket to power clubs Lancashire and Yorkshire
1900	Hampshire	0	16	6	Lost star batsman Robert Poore to the Boer War
1901	Derbyshire	0	13	7	
1910	Somerset	0	15	3	Lost star bowler Bill Greswell to business in Ceylon. Two-year record in 1910 and 1911 was one win, 28 losses and five draws
1924	Derbyshire	0	13	11	
1928	Worcestershire	0	19	11	Most matches and most losses by any winless county team. Played 54 county matches without a win between June 1927 and May 1929.
1936	Northamptonshire	0	9	15	Did win one game against Sussex under "one-innings" rules after first two days washed out by rain
1937	Northamptonshire	0	16	8	Lost star batsman Fred Bakewell to a car crash and bowler "Nobby" Clark to loss of form
1938	Northamptonshire	0	17	7	Ninety-nine County Championship matches without a win between 14 May 1935 and 29 May 1939
1967	Nottinghamshire	0	4	24	Only team to be winless without finishing bottom 24 drawn matches is most in county cricket history; four finished games is fewest in a season of more than sixteen games
1979	Glamorgan	0	10	11	
1982	Warwickshire	0	8	14	Alvin Kallicharran was leading run-scorer in country, but bowling exceptionally weak with average of over 45 runs per wicket
1996	Durham	0	12	5	Won only one match in any competition (four-day or one) against a first-class opponent
2008	Surrey	0	5	10	First Division
2008	Gloucestershire	0	5	11	Second Division
2009	Worcestershire	0	10	6	First Division
2013	Leicestershire	0	8	8	Second Division
2014	Northamptonshire	0	12	4	First Division
2014	Leicestershire	0	10	6	Second Division. First back-to-back winless seasons by a county since the Second World War.
2016	Derbyshire	0	10	5	Second Division. One match abandoned with no play.
2017	Leicestershire	0	9	5	Second Division
2019	Nottinghamshire	0	10	4	First Division

There were no completely winless seasons in the Sunday League limited-overs competition during its history from 1969 to 2009.

=== International first-class cricket ===
With the exception of the Sheffield Shield since the 1970s, most first-class cricket competitions outside England have either been knock-outs or of such short length that it becomes an everyday occurrence for a team to lose all its games. Some, such as the Ranji Trophy and most seasons of the Quaid-e-Azam Trophy, have indeed been knockout competitions, which typically use first innings lead to decide if a match is unfinished.

There have still be some notable winless sequences in non-English first-class cricket:

- in the 1981–1982 Quaid-e-Azam Trophy, Karachi lost all nine of its matches
- between 1959–1960 and 1986–1987, Jammu and Kashmir played a total of 115 games without a win

=== International one-day and Twenty20 cricket ===
In the 2012–13 season of the Australian Big Bash League, the Sydney Thunder completed an imperfect season where they lost all their eight games despite possessing the likes of Chris Gayle.

== Esports ==
=== Overwatch League ===
The Shanghai Dragons lost all 40 of their games in the inaugural 2018 season of the Overwatch League. They also lost their first two games of the second season, for a streak of 42 losses before defeating Boston Uprising on February 22, 2019.

== Ice hockey ==
=== Ukrainian Hockey Championship ===
Winless seasons occurred frequently in the Ukrainian Hockey Championship, the top-level ice hockey league in Ukraine. The longest series belongs to HK Dniprovski Vovky who lost all 30 games in the regulation time in the 2007–08 season. SDYuShOR Sokil, the academy team of HC Sokil Kyiv, had three winless seasons (1999–2000, 2004–05, and 2006–07). Four more teams completed a season without winning a single game: Ivars Kyiv lost all 12 games in 1996–97, Kryzynka II, the second team of HK Kryzynka Kyiv (playing in the same league as the main team), tied 1 and lost 13 games out of 14 in 1998–99, HC Khimik Sieverodonetsk lost all 16 games in 2003–04, and VIM-Berkut lost all 10 games in 2009–10.

== Netball ==
Central Pulse

During the 2008 ANZ Championship season, Central Pulse suffered a winless season. The only point they gained was by default. In their Round 10 match against West Coast Fever, a leaky roof at Challenge Stadium saw the match called off and declared a draw. Each team received one point. Pulse nearly went two seasons without a win. However, after 24 games, Pulse eventually won their first ever match when they defeated the reigning champions, New South Wales Swifts, 53–52 in a 2009 Round 13 match at the Te Rauparaha Arena.

Adelaide Thunderbirds

During the 2018 Suncorp Super Netball season, Adelaide Thunderbirds lost all 14 of their 14 games.

== Rugby league ==
=== Great Britain ===
In the Rugby Football League Championship, teams initially played a variable number of games, with the maximum ranging over time from 26 to 38, and some teams playing as few as fourteen. In more modern times the fixture list has been standardised at 26 games per team.

As a result of this fairly lengthy schedule, it has been almost impossible for British rugby league teams to lose all their games, with the only exception being during World War II's so-called "Wartime emergency League" when teams were often able to arrange no more than ten games and some as few as five. The only four winless seasons since normal competition resumed after the war have been in the second and third divisions of the Championship.

In 2018, West Wales Raiders set a number of Rugby League records for futility on course to losing all 26 games, including the largest point differential (−1930 points), most points conceded (2106) and largest average number of points conceded per game (81). In addition, they were on the receiving end of Rugby League's largest ever defeat – a 144–0 loss to York City Knights.

Season	Team	Wins	Losses	Draws	Remarks
2018	West Wales Raiders	0	26	0	League 1 Conceded 2106 points Set a new world record for biggest Rugby League defeat, losing 144–0 to York City Knights; Finished on −4 points after fielding an ineligible player in two matches
2006	Oldham	0	18	0	National League One; Finished with a points difference of −724
1991–92	Nottingham City	0	26	0	Third Division; Last season in league Finished with a points difference of −1159
1989–90	Runcorn Highfield	0	28	0	Second Division; Renamed Highfield for following season; still took five successive wooden spoons before disbanding in 1997
1941–1942	Bramley	0	19	0	Left the league until 1945–1946
1940–1941	Broughton Rangers	0	10	0	"Wartime Emergency Season"; Left the league until 1945–1946 as Belle Vue Rangers before disbanding in 1955.
1940–1941	Leigh	0	13	0	"Wartime Emergency Season"; Did not return until 1946–1947
1906–1907	Liverpool City	0	30	0	Scored only 76 points and conceded almost 1,400.

=== New South Wales Rugby Football League/National Rugby League ===
In the New South Wales Rugby Football League, the ancestor of today's National Rugby League, seasons were initially between eight (in the event of Kangaroo tours) and sixteen games long, so that a very bad team could go through a season with only losses. As a result of the expansion of the NSWRL from 1947 onwards, the season has been lengthened gradually with a few intermissions. The following NSWRFL teams up to 1966 did not win a single game:

Season	Team	Wins	Losses	Draws	Remarks
1966	Easts	0	18	0	Longest winless season in NSWRL/NRL history. Last season with 18 games: in 1967 the season expanded to 22. Sequence of 29 winless games from Round 13 of 1965.
1946	Souths	0	14	0	Lost 22 successive games after the death of Alf Blair during the 1944/1945 off-season.
1937	University	0	8	0	Team disbanded after season shortened by Kangaroo tour, having won only one game in three years (13–11 against St. George in the last round of 1936).
1935	University	0	16	0	Lost 42 consecutive games after winning 4–3 in opening game of 1934
1921	University	0	8	0	Kangaroo tour shortened season. Won only one game in initial season of 1920 for a combined 1–20 record.
1920	Annandale	0	13	0	Disbanded at end of season after having won only one game (8–5 against Norths) in three seasons.
1918	Annandale	0	14	0	Sequence of 27 winless games: won only twice in last four seasons

Since 1967, NSWRFL and later NSWRL, ARL and NRL seasons have been between 22 and 26 games long; thus it is much less likely a very bad team could lose every single one of its games.

=== Brisbane Rugby League/Queensland Cup ===
The Brisbane Rugby League premiership began in 1909 and continued in varying forms until 1996, after which it was superseded by the Queensland Cup. Between the 1930s and the 1960s it was of comparable standard to the New South Wales Rugby Football League, but subsequently a huge drain of players to Sydney eroded the standard of play. Before World War II seasons were typically no more than twelve games long, so that a very bad team could easily fail to win a game; however as the competition grew it was expanded to 21 games, which made winless seasons much less likely.

Season	Team	Wins	Losses	Draws	Remarks
2023	Ipswich Jets	0	20	0	Will end the season on 4 points as each club has two byes
1946	Western Suburbs	0	10	0	Broke its losing streak in the opening game of 1947 but fell to 2–7–1; then won premiership in 1948.
1945	Eastern Suburbs	0	10	0	Would rise to minor premiers in 1946 and six straight grand finals 1946 to 1951 via massive recruitment drive.
1944	Eastern Suburbs	0	10	0	Two consecutive winless seasons
1943	Western Suburbs	0	9	0	Forfeited scheduled tenth match to Northern Suburbs.
1940	Eastern Suburbs	0	10	0	Nine-season record from 1937 to 1945 was 9–81–0.
1934	Southern Suburbs	0	11	0	
1933	Southern Suburbs	0	12	0	Finished last every season from 1933 to 1937 with combined record of 5–48–0, including consecutive winless seasons.
1925	University	0	9	2	Would finish 7–5 in 1926, but disbanded in middle of 1934 season after all players moved to rugby union.
1915	West End	0	8	0	Became "Ipswich" the following season, but did not compete after that.

== Rugby union ==
Super Rugby, the Southern Hemisphere's principal club competition, has seen two teams go through an entire season with no wins or draws. Both seasons were in the competition's past incarnations of Super 12 and Super 14, each name reflecting the number of competing teams.

Under both Super 12 (1996–2005) and Super 14 (2006–2010) formats, each team played all other teams once, resulting in seasons of 11 and then 13 games. The competition became Super Rugby with the addition of a 15th team in 2011. The season format was also heavily revamped; the regular season now consists of 16 matches.

The Super 12 and Super 14 eras each saw one team finish a season with only losses; both teams with this dubious distinction are from South Africa. In 2002, the Bulls, based in Pretoria, finished with 11 losses from 11 matches. The other imperfect season was that of the Johannesburg-based Lions in the final season of the Super 14 format in 2010, who lost all 13 of their matches, while ending up with a final points difference of negative 300.

In 2018, the Sydney Rays finished the National Rugby Championship regular season with 0 wins and 0 draws in 7 games.

In 2019, the Austin Elite finished the Major League Rugby regular season with 0 wins and draws in 16 games. It was part of a 22 match winless streak that started in 2018 and ended with the final match of the 2020 before the season was cancelled by the Covid-19 pandemic.

Anthem Rugby Carolina had a winless season in Major League Rugby in 2024 with 0 wins and draws in 16 games, they had another winless season in 2025.

== Other sports ==
In many sports winless seasons may be the norm for many, or even most, competitors; particularly those where the competition does not take place in the form of discrete 1-on-1 matches, such as running.

== Notes ==
^{a} In the 1944 under-19 wartime competition that replaced the senior competition between 1942 and that season due to the player drain of World War II, South Fremantle lost all nineteen of their games.
