= Narimanov =

Narimanov (masculine) or Narimanova (feminine or masculine genitive) may refer to:

== People ==
- Nariman Narimanov (1870–1925), Azerbaijani revolutionary, writer, and statesman
- Nikolai Narimanov (born 1958), Soviet ice hockey player

== Places ==
- Nərimanov raion, a city district of Baku, Azerbaijan
- Nərimanov, a village and municipality in Saatly District, Azerbaijan
- Nərimanabad, Lankaran, formerly Narimanov, Azerbaijan
- Narimanov, Russia, several inhabited localities in Russia
  - Narimanov, Astrakhan Oblast, Russia

== See also ==
- Narimanovsky (disambiguation)
- Nariman bey Narimanbeyov (1889–1937), Azerbaijani lawyer and statesman
- Promysel Narimanova, a village in Azerbaijan
- Narimanovo Airport, in Astrakhan, Russia
