= Mezhozyorny, Astrakhan Oblast =

Mezhozyorny Межозёрный
- Settlement
- Location within Astrakhan Oblast Location within Russia
- Coordinates: 46°20′N 47°51′E
- Country: Russia
- Region: Astrakhan Oblast
- District: Narimanovsky District
- Time zone: UTC+4:00

Mezhozyorny (Russian: Межозёрный) is a rural locality (a settlement) in Starokucherganovsky Selsoviet, Narimanovsky District, Astrakhan Oblast, Russia. The population was 8 as of 2010.

== Geography ==
Mezhozyorny is located 48 km south of Narimanov (the district's administrative centre) by road. Trusovo is the nearest rural locality.
