= Tulata =

Tulata Тулата
- Settlement
- Location within Astrakhan Oblast Location within Russia
- Coordinates: 46°21′N 47°10′E
- Country: Russia
- Region: Astrakhan Oblast
- District: Narimanovsky District
- Time zone: UTC+4:00

Tulata (Russian: Тулата) is a rural locality (a settlement) in Solyansky Selsoviet, Narimanovsky District, Astrakhan Oblast, Russia. The population was 53 as of 2010.

== Geography ==
Tulata is located 115 km southwest of Narimanov (the district's administrative centre) by road. Solyony is the nearest rural locality.
