= Ostrov Dolgy =

Ostrov Dolgy Остров Долгий
- Settlement
- Location within Astrakhan Oblast Location within Russia
- Coordinates: 46°31′N 48°00′E
- Country: Russia
- Region: Astrakhan Oblast
- District: Narimanovsky District
- Time zone: UTC+4:00

Ostrov Dolgy (Russian: Остров Долгий) is a rural locality (a settlement) in Rassvetsky Selsoviet, Narimanovsky District, Astrakhan Oblast, Russia. The population was 18 as of 2010. There are 2 streets.

== Geography ==
Ostrov Dolgy is located 62 km southeast of Narimanov (the district's administrative centre) by road. Rastopulovka is the nearest rural locality.
