= Trusovo =

Trusovo Трусово
- Settlement
- Location within Astrakhan Oblast Location within Russia
- Coordinates: 46°20′N 47°57′E
- Country: Russia
- Region: Astrakhan Oblast
- District: Narimanovsky District
- Time zone: UTC+4:00

Trusovo (Russian: Трусово) is a rural locality (a settlement) in Starokucherganovsky Selsoviet, Narimanovsky District, Astrakhan Oblast, Russia. The population was 1,610 as of 2010. There are 15 streets.

== Geography ==
Trusovo is located 44 km south of Narimanov (the district's administrative centre) by road. Bishtyubinka is the nearest rural locality.
