= Solyony (disambiguation) =

Solyony (Russian: Солёный) is a rural locality (a settlement) in Prikaspiysky Selsoviet, Narimanovsky District, Astrakhan Oblast, Russia

Solyony may also refer to:

- Solyony, Republic of Bashkortostan
- Captain Solyony in Chekhov's play Three Sisters
