= Rychansky =

Rychansky Рычанский
- Settlement
- Location within Astrakhan Oblast Location within Russia
- Coordinates: 46°31′N 48°04′E
- Country: Russia
- Region: Astrakhan Oblast
- District: Narimanovsky District
- Time zone: UTC+4:00

Rychansky (Russian: Рычанский) is a rural locality (a settlement) in Akhmatovsky Selsoviet, Narimanovsky District, Astrakhan Oblast, Russia. The population was 237 as of 2010. There are 14 streets.

== Geography ==
Rychansky is located 63 km southeast of Narimanov (the district's administrative centre) by road. Rastopulovka is the nearest rural locality.
