= Yuri Shundrov =

Russian-Ukrainian ice hockey player

- Born: 6 June 1956; Penza, Russian SSR, Soviet Union
- Died: 27 July 2018 (aged 62)
- Height: 5 ft 7 in (170 cm)
- Weight: 152 lb (69 kg; 10 st 12 lb)
- Position: Goaltender
- Caught: Right
- Played for: Dizelist Penza; Sokil Kyiv; KHK Crvena Zvezda; Khimik Voskresensk; Kryzhynka Kyiv; Rapid Bucuresti
- National team: Soviet Union and Ukraine
- NHL draft: Undrafted
- Playing career: 1978–2000

Yuri Alexandrovich Shundrov (Russian: Юрий Александрович Шундров, Ukrainian: Ю́рій О́лександрович Шу́ндров; 6 June 1956 – 27 July 2018) was a Russian-Ukrainian former ice hockey goaltender.

== Career ==
Shundrov began his career with Sokil Kyiv in the Soviet Championship League during the 1978–79 season. He played for Sokil exclusively until the 1990–91 season, which he split between them and KHK Crvena Zvezda of the Yugoslav Ice Hockey League. He then joined Khimik Voskresensk for the 1991–92 season and played for them until 1994, when he re-joined Sokil Kyiv. After three seasons spent with Sokil, he re-joined Khimik Voskresensk, who he played two more seasons with. Shundrov retired following the 1999–2000 season spent with Kryzhynka Kyiv and Rapid Bucuresti.

Internationally, Shundrov played two exhibition games for the USSR against Czechoslovakia in 1985 and played for the Ukraine men's national ice hockey team at the World Championships in 1995 (Pool C), 1997 (Pool C), 1998 (Pool B), and 1999 (Top Division).

Shundrov became the goaltending coach for HC CSKA Moscow of the Kontinental Hockey League in 2011. He had previously been goaltending coach for Metallurg Magnitogorsk from 2008 to 2010. From 2014 to 2017, he was goalkeeping coach at HC Sochi.

== Honours ==
Ref.:

Sokil Kyiv

- Ukrainian Hockey Championship (2): 1994–95, 1996–97

Soviet Union U20

- IIHF World Junior Championship: 1976

Soviet Union U19

- IIHF European Junior Championships: 1975
