= Bishtyubinka =

Bishtyubinka Биштюбинка
- Selo
- Location within Astrakhan Oblast Location within Russia
- Coordinates: 46°18′N 46°51′E
- Country: Russia
- Region: Astrakhan Oblast
- District: Narimanovsky District
- Time zone: UTC+4:00

Bishtyubinka (Russian: Биштюбинка) is a rural locality (a selo) in Starokucherganovsky Selsoviet, Narimanovsky District, Astrakhan Oblast, Russia. The population was 1,117 as of 2010. There is 1 street.

== Geography ==
Bishtyubinka is located 46 km south of Narimanov (the district's administrative centre) by road. Trusovo is the nearest rural locality.
