= Kurchenko, Astrakhan Oblast =

Kurchenko Курченко
- Selo
- Location within Astrakhan Oblast Location within Russia
- Coordinates: 46°14′N 47°32′E
- Country: Russia
- Region: Astrakhan Oblast
- District: Narimanovsky District
- Time zone: UTC+4:00

Kurchenko (Russian: Курченко, Tatar: Qartuzan) is a rural locality (a selo) and the administrative center of Kurchensky Selsoviet, Narimanovsky District, Astrakhan Oblast, Russia. The population was 423 as of 2010. There are 4 streets.

== Geography ==
Kurchenko is located 80 km southwest of Narimanov (the district's administrative centre) by road. Turkmenka is the nearest rural locality.
