= 1997–98 Ukrainian Hockey Championship =

- League: Ukrainian Hockey Championship
- Sport: Ice hockey
- Number of teams: 7

Regular season
- Regular season winners: HC Sokil Kyiv

Playoffs
- Finals champions: HC Sokil Kyiv
- Runners-up: HC Berkut

Ukrainian Hockey Championship seasons
- ← 1996–97 1998–99 →

The 1997–98 Ukrainian Hockey League season was the fifth season of the Ukrainian Hockey League, the top level of ice hockey in Ukraine. Seven teams participated in the league, and HC Sokil Kyiv won the championship.

== Regular season ==
	Club	GP	W	T	L	GF:GA	Pts
1.	HC Sokil Kyiv	12	11	1	0	84:12	23
2.	Politechnik Yasya Kyiv	12	8	0	4	47:39	16
3.	HK Berkut Kharkiv	12	6	1	5	41:35	13
4.	Sdyushor Kharkiv	12	6	1	5	48:51	13
5.	HK ATEK Kyiv	12	3	2	7	34:67	8
6.	HK Kryzhynka Kyiv	12	3	0	9	36:46	6
7.	Sdyushor Sokol Kyiv	12	2	1	9	26:66	5

== Playoffs ==
Semifinals

- HC Sokil Kyiv 7 - Sdyushor Kharkiv 3
- Berkut Kharkov 3 - Politechink Yasya Kyiv 2

Final

- HC Sokil Kyiv 5 - Berkut Kharkiv 2

3rd place

- Politechnik Yasya Kyiv 8 - Sdyushor Kharkov 3
