= Tuluganovka =

Tuluganovka (Russian: Боровинка) is the name of several rural localities in Russia:

- Tuluganovka, Volodarsky District, Astrakhan Oblast, a selo in Volodarsky District, Astrakhan Oblast
- Tuluganovka, Narimanovsky District, Astrakhan Oblast, a selo in Narimanovsky District, Astrakhan Oblast
