= Novokucherganovka =

Novokucherganovka Новокучергановка
- Selo
- Location within Astrakhan Oblast Location within Russia
- Coordinates: 46°17′N 47°52′E
- Country: Russia
- Region: Astrakhan Oblast
- District: Narimanovsky District
- Time zone: UTC+4:00

Novokucherganovka (Russian: Новокучергановка) is a rural locality (a selo) in Starokucherganovsky Selsoviet, Narimanovsky District, Astrakhan Oblast, Russia. The population was 482 as of 2010. There are 14 streets.

== Geography ==
Novokucherganovka is located 51 km south of Narimanov (the district's administrative centre) by road. Starokucherganovka is the nearest rural locality.
