= Lineynoye =

Lineynoye Линейное
- Selo
- Location within Astrakhan Oblast Location within Russia
- Coordinates: 46°15′N 47°24′E
- Country: Russia
- Region: Astrakhan Oblast
- District: Narimanovsky District
- Time zone: UTC+4:00

Lineynoye (Russian: Линейное, Tatar: Kämenni) is a rural locality (a selo) and the administrative center of Lineyninsky Selsoviet, Narimanovsky District, Astrakhan Oblast, Russia. The population was 832 as of 2010. There are 6 streets.

== Geography ==
Lineynoye is located 89 km southwest of Narimanov (the district's administrative centre) by road. Turkmenka is the nearest rural locality.
