= Dzhurak =

Dzhurak Джурак
- Settlement
- Location within Astrakhan Oblast Location within Russia
- Coordinates: 46°12′N 47°05′E
- Country: Russia
- Region: Astrakhan Oblast
- District: Narimanovsky District
- Time zone: UTC+4:00

Dzhurak (Russian: Джурак) is a rural locality (a settlement) in Astrakhansky Selsoviet, Narimanovsky District, Astrakhan Oblast, Russia. As of 2010, the population was 214. The settlement has four streets.

== Geography ==
Dzhurak is located 144 km southwest of Narimanov (the district's administrative centre) by road. Prikaspiysky is the nearest rural locality.
