= Kovylny =

Kovylny Ковыльный
- Settlement
- Location within Astrakhan Oblast Location within Russia
- Coordinates: 46°18′N 46°36′E
- Country: Russia
- Region: Astrakhan Oblast
- District: Narimanovsky District
- Time zone: UTC+4:00

Kovylny (Russian: Ковыльный) is a rural locality (a settlement) in Prikaspiysky Selsoviet, Narimanovsky District, Astrakhan Oblast, Russia. The population was 77 as of 2010. There is 1 street.

== Geography ==
Kovylny is located 153 km southwest of Narimanov (the district's administrative centre) by road. Drofiny is the nearest rural locality.
