= Narimanovsky =

Narimanovsky (masculine), Narimanovskaya (feminine), or Narimanovskoye (neuter) may refer to:

- Narimanovsky District, a district of Astrakhan Oblast, Russia
- Narimanovsky (rural locality), a settlement in Oryol Oblast, Russia

== See also ==
- Narimanov (disambiguation)
