= Saygachny =

Saygachny Сайгачный
- Settlement
- Location within Astrakhan Oblast Location within Russia
- Coordinates: 46°16′N 46°41′E
- Country: Russia
- Region: Astrakhan Oblast
- District: Narimanovsky District
- Time zone: UTC+4:00

Saygachny (Russian: Сайгачный) is a rural locality (a settlement) in Astrakhansky Selsoviet, Narimanovsky District, Astrakhan Oblast, Russia. The population was 196 as of 2010. There are 2 streets.

== Geography ==
Saygachny is located 146 km southwest of Narimanov (the district's administrative centre) by road. Drofiny is the nearest rural locality.
