= 1999–2000 Ukrainian Hockey Championship =

- League: Ukrainian Hockey Championship
- Sport: Ice hockey
- Number of teams: 8

Regular season
- Regular season winners: Politekhnik Kyiv

Playoffs
- Finals champions: HC Berkut
- Runners-up: HC Sokil Kyiv

Ukrainian Hockey Championship seasons
- ← 1998–99 2000–01 →

The 1999–2000 Ukrainian Hockey League season was the seventh season of the Ukrainian Hockey League, the top level of ice hockey in Ukraine. Eight teams participated in the league, and HC Sokil Kyiv won the championship.

== Regular season ==
	Club	GP	W	T	L	GF:GA	Pts
1.	Politekhnik Kyiv	10	8	1	1	58:37	17
2.	HK Kryzhynka Kyiv	10	7	2	1	60:28	16
3.	Sdyushor Kharkiv	10	5	0	5	43:37	10
4.	HC Sokil Kyiv II	10	3	2	5	35:36	8
5.	HK ATEK Kyiv	10	2	4	4	34:36	8
6.	Sdyushor Sokil Kyiv	10	0	1	9	14:70	1

== Playoffs ==
Semifinals

- HC Sokil Kyiv 8 - HK Kryzhynka Kyiv 0
- HC Berkut 8 - Politechnik Yasya Kyiv 1

Final

- HC Berkut 3 - HC Sokil Kyiv 1

3rd place

- Politechnik Yasya Kyiv 10 - HK Kryzhynka Kyiv 1
