= Prikaspiysky =

Prikaspiysky Прикаспийский
- Settlement
- Location within Astrakhan Oblast Location within Russia
- Coordinates: 46°13′N 47°11′E
- Country: Russia
- Region: Astrakhan Oblast
- District: Narimanovsky District
- Time zone: UTC+4:00

Prikaspiysky (Russian: Прикаспийский) is a rural locality (a settlement) and the administrative center of Prikaspiysky Selsoviet, Narimanovsky District, Astrakhan Oblast, Russia. The population was 1,597 as of 2010. There are 5 streets.

== Geography ==
Prikaspiysky is located 110 km southwest of Narimanov (the district's administrative centre) by road. Buruny is the nearest rural locality.
