= Jim Campbell (ice hockey) =

American ice hockey player (born 1973)

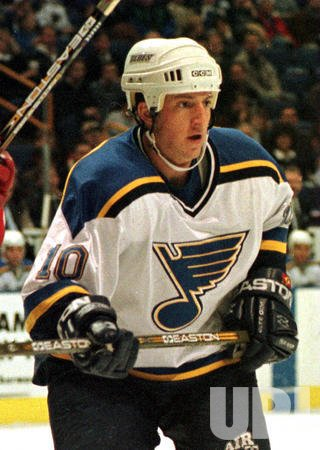
- Campbell with the St. Louis Blues
- Born: April 3, 1973 (age 53) Worcester, Massachusetts, U.S.
- Height: 6 ft 2 in (188 cm)
- Weight: 205 lb (93 kg; 14 st 9 lb)
- Position: Right wing
- Shot: Right
- Played for: Mighty Ducks of Anaheim; St. Louis Blues; Montreal Canadiens; Chicago Blackhawks; Florida Panthers; Tampa Bay Lightning; HC Neftekhimik Nizhnekamsk; EHC Basel; EHC Visp
- National team: United States
- NHL draft: 28th overall, 1991; Montreal Canadiens
- Playing career: 1993–2007

James Tower Campbell (born February 3, 1973) is an American former political candidate and professional ice hockey player. He played 285 games in the National Hockey League (NHL) for the Tampa Bay Lightning, Florida Panthers, Chicago Blackhawks, Montreal Canadiens, St. Louis Blues and Mighty Ducks of Anaheim before finishing his career in Europe. Campbell was a candidate in the Republican primary for Missouri's 4th district in the 2022 United States House of Representatives elections.

== Playing career ==
As a youth, Campbell played in the 1987 Quebec International Pee-Wee Hockey Tournament with the Boston Bruins' minor ice hockey team. Campbell was drafted by the Montreal Canadiens in the second round, 28th overall, of the 1991 NHL entry draft. With the St. Louis Blues from 1996, he scored 84 points over two seasons. Campbell faced a lingering groin problem that started to affect his performance, leading to a slump and frequent team changes across different leagues.

Campbell played for the Springfield Falcons in the American Hockey League while contracted to the Tampa Bay Lightning, who loaned him to the Philadelphia Phantoms midway through the 2005–06 season in exchange for Dan Cavanaugh. While in Philly, he posted 12 goals, 17 assists, for 29 points and 46 penalty minutes in 35 games. Campbell played two games for HC Neftekhimik Nizhnekamsk in the Russian Super League in 2003–04 season and spent the 2006–07 season with EHC Basel in Switzerland's Nationalliga A. In 1993, Campbell won Tampere Cup and became the top scorer of the tournament.

== Career statistics ==
=== Regular season and playoffs ===
			Regular season					Playoffs
Season	Team	League	GP	G	A	Pts	PIM	GP	G	A	Pts	PIM
1988–89	Northwood School	HS-Prep	12	12	8	20	6	—	—	—	—	—
1989–90	Northwood School	HS-Prep	8	14	7	21	8	—	—	—	—	—
1990–91	Lawrence Academy	HS-Prep	26	36	47	83	26	—	—	—	—	—
1991–92	Hull Olympiques	QMJHL	64	41	44	85	51	6	7	3	10	8
1992–93	Hull Olympiques	QMJHL	50	42	29	71	66	8	11	4	15	43
1993–94	United States	Intl	56	24	33	57	59	—	—	—	—	—
1993–94	Fredericton Canadiens	AHL	19	6	17	23	6	—	—	—	—	—
1994–95	Fredericton Canadiens	AHL	77	27	24	51	103	12	0	7	7	8
1995–96	Fredericton Canadiens	AHL	44	28	23	51	24	—	—	—	—	—
1995–96	Baltimore Bandits	AHL	16	13	7	20	8	12	7	5	12	10
1995–96	Mighty Ducks of Anaheim	NHL	16	2	3	5	36	—	—	—	—	—
1996–97	St. Louis Blues	NHL	68	23	20	43	68	4	1	0	1	6
1997–98	St. Louis Blues	NHL	76	22	19	41	55	10	7	3	10	12
1998–99	St. Louis Blues	NHL	55	4	21	25	41	—	—	—	—	—
1999–2000	Worcester IceCats	AHL	66	31	34	65	88	9	1	2	3	6
1999–2000	Manitoba Moose	IHL	10	1	3	4	10	—	—	—	—	—
1999–2000	St. Louis Blues	NHL	2	0	0	0	9	—	—	—	—	—
2000–01	Quebec Citadelles	AHL	3	5	0	5	6	—	—	—	—	—
2000–01	Montreal Canadiens	NHL	57	9	11	20	53	—	—	—	—	—
2001–02	Norfolk Admirals	AHL	44	11	14	25	66	4	3	1	4	2
2001–02	Chicago Blackhawks	NHL	9	1	1	2	4	—	—	—	—	—
2002–03	San Antonio Rampage	AHL	64	16	37	53	55	1	0	0	0	0
2002–03	Florida Panthers	NHL	1	0	0	0	0	—	—	—	—	—
2003–04	Neftekhimik Nizhnekamsk	RSL	2	0	0	0	2	—	—	—	—	—
2003–04	Chicago Wolves	AHL	41	10	13	23	41	—	—	—	—	—
2004–05	Bridgeport Sound Tigers	AHL	46	8	12	20	64	—	—	—	—	—
2004–05	Springfield Falcons	AHL	13	2	5	7	8	—	—	—	—	—
2005–06	Springfield Falcons	AHL	32	12	12	24	24	—	—	—	—	—
2005–06	Tampa Bay Lightning	NHL	1	0	0	0	2	—	—	—	—	—
2005–06	Philadelphia Phantoms	AHL	35	12	17	29	46	—	—	—	—	—
2006–07	EHC Basel	NLA	8	2	3	5	12	—	—	—	—	—
2006–07	EHC Visp	NLB	16	8	14	22	46	—	—	—	—	—
AHL totals			500	181	215	396	499	38	11	15	26	26
NHL totals			285	61	75	136	268	14	8	3	11	18

=== International ===
Year	Team	Event	Result	GP	G	A	Pts	PIM
1992	United States	WJC	3rd place, bronze medalist(s)	7	2	4	6	4
1993	United States	WJC	4th	7	5	2	7	2
1994	United States	OG	8th	8	0	0	0	6
1997	United States	WC	6th	4	0	0	0	2
2001	United States	WC	4th	9	2	2	4	12
Junior totals				14	7	6	13	6
Senior totals				21	2	2	4	20

== Awards and honors ==
Award	Year
AHL
All-Star Game	1996
NHL
All-Rookie Team	1997

== Transactions ==
- January 21, 1996 - Traded to Mighty Ducks of Anaheim by Montreal Canadiens for Robert Dirk.
- July 11, 1996 - Signed as a free agent by St. Louis.
- October 4, 1999 - Loaned to Manitoba (IHL) by St. Louis, recalled November 1, 1999.
- August 21, 2000 - Signed as a free agent by Montreal Canadiens.
- November 19, 2001 - Signed as a free agent by Chicago Blackhawks.
- July 19, 2002 - Signed as a free agent by Florida Panthers.
- December 10, 2003 - Signed as a free agent by Chicago (AHL).
- August 11, 2004 - Signed as a free agent by New York Islanders.
- August 18, 2005 - Signed as a free agent by Tampa Bay Lightning.
