= Tuluganovka, Narimanovsky District, Astrakhan Oblast =

Tuluganovka Тулугановка
- Selo
- Location within Astrakhan Oblast Location within Russia
- Coordinates: 46°31′N 48°05′E
- Country: Russia
- Region: Astrakhan Oblast
- District: Narimanovsky District
- Time zone: UTC+4:00

Tuluganovka (Russian: Тулугановка) is a rural locality (a selo) and the administrative center of Akhmatovsky Selsoviet, Narimanovsky District, Astrakhan Oblast, Russia. The population was 425 as of 2010. There are 28 streets.

== Geography ==
Tuluganovka is located 64 km southeast of Narimanov (the district's administrative centre) by road. Rychansky is the nearest rural locality.
