= 1998–99 Ukrainian Hockey Championship =

- League: Ukrainian Hockey Championship
- Sport: Ice hockey
- Number of teams: 9

Regular season
- Regular season winners: HC Sokil Kyiv II

Playoffs
- Finals champions: HC Sokil Kyiv
- Runners-up: HC Berkut

Ukrainian Hockey Championship seasons
- ← 1997–98 1999–2000 →

The 1998–99 Ukrainian Hockey League season was the sixth season of the Ukrainian Hockey League, the top level of ice hockey in Ukraine. Eight teams participated in the league, and HC Sokil Kyiv won the championship.

== Regular season ==
	Club	GP	W	T	L	GF:GA	Pts
1.	HC Sokil Kyiv II	14	12	0	2	92:27	24
2.	HC Berkut	14	12	0	2	112:27	24
3.	HK Kryzhynka Kyiv	14	9	1	4	72:41	19
4.	Politekhnik Kyiv	14	7	0	7	66:77	14
5.	Sdyushor Kharkiv	14	7	0	7	75:48	14
6.	HK ATEK Kyiv	14	5	1	8	45:65	11
7.	Sdyushor Sokil Kyiv	14	2	1	11	39:104	5
8.	HK Kryzynka Kyiv II	14	0	1	13	28:140	1

== Playoffs ==
Semifinals

- HC Sokil Kyiv - HK Kryzhynka Kyiv 2-0 on series
- HC Berkut - HC Sokil Kyiv II 2-0 on series

Final

- HC Sokil Kyiv - HC Berkut 3-1 on series

3rd place

- HC Sokil Kyiv II - HK Kryzhynka Kyiv 2-0 on series
