= Narimanov, Russia =

Narimanov (Russian: Нариманов; masculine) or Narimanova (Нариманова; feminine or masculine genitive) is the name of several inhabited localities in Russia.

== Urban localities ==
- Narimanov, Astrakhan Oblast, a town in Narimanovsky District of Astrakhan Oblast; 46°41′N 47°51′E

== Rural localities ==
- Narimanov, Rostov Oblast, a khutor in Leninskoye Rural Settlement of Zimovnikovsky District of Rostov Oblast
- Narimanova, a village in Narimanovsky Rural Okrug of Tyumensky District of Tyumen Oblast

== See also ==
- imeni Narimanova, Russia, a rural locality (a settlement) in Nurlatsky District of the Republic of Tatarstan
