= Valery Shiryaev =

Valeri Shiryayev
- Born: August 26, 1963 (age 61); Kharkiv, Ukrainian SSR, Soviet Union
- Height: 5 ft 10 in (178 cm)
- Weight: 187 lb (85 kg; 13 st 5 lb)
- Position: Defence
- Shot: Left
- Played for: Sokil Kiev; EHC Biel; HC La Chaux-de-Fonds; HC Davos; EV Zug; SC Bern; SCL Tigers; Genève-Servette HC
- National team: Soviet Union and Ukraine
- Playing career: 1980–2009; 2013–2016

Valery Viktorovych Shiryaev (Ukrainian: Вале́рій Ві́кторович Ширя́єв; born 28 August 1963) is a retired ice hockey player who played in the Soviet Hockey League. He played for Sokil Kyiv and was named top defenceman in the Soviet League in 1990 and 1991. He won a gold medal in the 1989 World Ice Hockey Championships for the Soviet Union. Later, he played for Ukraine in several World Championships and at the 2002 Winter Olympics. He was named best defenceman at the 1995 C1 Pool World Championships.

He was inducted into the Russian and Soviet Hockey Hall of Fame in 1989.
