= Mikhail Tatarinov =

Russian ice hockey player

- Born: July 16, 1966 (age 59) Angarsk, Russian SFSR, Soviet Union
- Height: 5 ft 10 in (178 cm)
- Weight: 195 lb (88 kg; 13 st 13 lb)
- Position: Defence
- Shot: Left
- Played for: Sokil Kyiv; Dynamo Moscow; Washington Capitals; Quebec Nordiques; Boston Bruins
- National team: Soviet Union
- NHL draft: 225th overall, 1984; Washington Capitals
- Playing career: 1983–1993

Mikhail Vladimirovich Tatarinov (Михаил Владимирович Татаринов; born July 16, 1966, in Angarsk, Soviet Union) is a retired Russian ice hockey defenceman.

A top offensive-minded defenceman for many years in the Soviet Union, Tatarinov was selected in the 1984 NHL entry draft by the Washington Capitals, however, it was another six years before he finally had a chance to play in the National Hockey League. He won the gold medal in the World Junior Championships in 1984 and 1986, and he played for many years with Moscow Dynamo. He was also part of the Soviet team that took on the NHL All-Stars in Rendez-vous '87. In 1990 he was voted on to the all-star team and was also named best defenceman of the tournament after helping the USSR win the gold medal at the World Championships.

In 1990, Tatarinov finally was able to come over to North America to play for the Capitals, and became the first young Soviet player to play in the NHL without defecting. He played one season with the Capitals before he was traded to the Quebec Nordiques, and had a very good season on a very bad Nordiques team in the 91–92. His second season with Quebec was limited by injuries. Tatarinov signed with the Boston Bruins prior to the 1993–94 NHL season, and played in just two games for the Bruins before injuries forced him to retire. He later struggled with alcoholism and spent time in jail for murder after his career ended.

== Career statistics ==
=== Regular season and playoffs ===
| | | | Regular season | | | | | Playoffs |
| Season | Team | League | GP | G | A | Pts | PIM | GP | G | A | Pts | PIM |
|---|---|---|---|---|---|---|---|---|---|---|---|---|
| 1983–84 | Sokil Kiev | USSR | 38 | 7 | 3 | 10 | 48 | — | — | — | — | — |
| 1984–85 | Sokil Kiev | USSR | 34 | 3 | 6 | 9 | 54 | — | — | — | — | — |
| 1985–86 | Sokil Kiev | USSR | 37 | 7 | 5 | 12 | 41 | — | — | — | — | — |
| 1986–87 | Dynamo Moscow | USSR | 40 | 10 | 8 | 18 | 43 | — | — | — | — | — |
| 1987–88 | Dynamo Moscow | USSR | 30 | 2 | 2 | 4 | 8 | — | — | — | — | — |
| 1988–89 | Dynamo Moscow | USSR | 4 | 1 | 0 | 1 | 2 | — | — | — | — | — |
| 1989–90 | Dynamo Moscow | USSR | 44 | 11 | 10 | 21 | 34 | — | — | — | — | — |
| 1990–91 | Dynamo Moscow | USSR | 11 | 5 | 4 | 9 | 6 | — | — | — | — | — |
| 1990–91 | Washington Capitals | NHL | 65 | 8 | 15 | 23 | 82 | — | — | — | — | — |
| 1991–92 | Quebec Nordiques | NHL | 66 | 11 | 27 | 38 | 72 | — | — | — | — | — |
| 1992–93 | Quebec Nordiques | NHL | 28 | 2 | 6 | 8 | 28 | — | — | — | — | — |
| 1993–94 | Boston Bruins | NHL | 2 | 0 | 0 | 0 | 2 | — | — | — | — | — |
| 1993–94 | Providence Bruins | AHL | 3 | 0 | 3 | 3 | 0 | — | — | — | — | — |
| USSR totals | | | 238 | 46 | 38 | 84 | 236 | — | — | — | — | — |
| NHL totals | | | 161 | 21 | 48 | 69 | 184 | — | — | — | — | — |

=== International ===
| Year | Team | Event | GP | G | A | Pts | PIM |
|---|---|---|---|---|---|---|---|
| 1984 | Soviet Union | EJC | 5 | 3 | 1 | 4 | 18 |
| 1984 | Soviet Union | WJC | 7 | 0 | 2 | 2 | 0 |
| 1985 | Soviet Union | WJC | 5 | 1 | 2 | 3 | 6 |
| 1986 | Soviet Union | WJC | 7 | 2 | 5 | 7 | 16 |
| 1990 | Soviet Union | WC | 10 | 3 | 8 | 11 | 20 |
| 1991 | Soviet Union | CC | 5 | 0 | 1 | 1 | 17 |
| Junior totals | | | 24 | 6 | 10 | 16 | 40 |
| Senior totals | | | 15 | 3 | 9 | 12 | 37 |
