= Anatoli Stepanishev =

Russian-Ukrainian ice hockey player

- Born: 29 January 1961 (age 65) Penza, Soviet Union
- Height: 6 ft 0 in (183 cm)
- Weight: 207 lb (94 kg; 14 st 11 lb)
- Position: Right wing
- Shot: Left
- Played for: Sokil Kyiv; EHC Chur; HC Davos; EHC Biel; SC Langnau; EK Zell am See; HC Ambri-Piotta; HC Neftekhimik Nizhnekamsk
- National team: Ukraine
- NHL draft: Undrafted
- Playing career: 1981–2001

Anatoli Nikolaevich Stepanishev (Russian: Анатолий Николаевич Степанищев; born 29 January 1961) is a Russian-Ukrainian former ice hockey player.

== Career ==
Stepanishev began his career with Sokil Kyiv in the Soviet Championship League during the 1981–82 season. He played for Sokil until 1990, when he joined the Swiss team EHC Chur. He played for Chur, HC Davos, EHC Biel, SC Langnau, and HC Ambri-Piotta in Switzerland between 1990 and 1995. During that time he also played part of the 1993 and 1995 seasons with Sokil Kyiv in the International Hockey League, and he spent the entire 1993–94 season with EK Zell am See in the Austrian National League. Stepanishev played the entire 1995–96 season for Sokil, before joining HC Neftekhimik Nizhnekamsk, who he played for until 1999. He spent part of the 1998–99 season with Sokil Kyiv and retired following the 2000–01 season spent with the team.

Internationally, Stepanishev played for the Ukraine men's national ice hockey team at the World Championships in 1993 (Pool C), 1994 (Pool C), 1995 (Pool C), 1996 (Pool C), 1997 (Pool C), 1998 (Pool B), and 1999 (Top Division).

He worked as an assistant coach for Kuban Krasnodar in the Higher Hockey League. Since 13 July 2015 till 6 February 2017, he worked as a main coach of HC Donbass in the Ukrainian Hockey Championship.
