= Alexander Godynyuk =

Ukrainian ice hockey player (born 1970)

- Born: January 27, 1970 (age 56) Kyiv, Ukrainian SSR, Soviet Union
- Height: 6 ft 0 in (183 cm)
- Weight: 198 lb (90 kg; 14 st 2 lb)
- Position: Defence
- Shot: Left
- Played for: Sokil Kyiv; ShVSM Kyiv; Toronto Maple Leafs; Calgary Flames; Florida Panthers; Hartford Whalers; SC Bern; Eisbären Berlin
- National team: Ukraine
- NHL draft: 115th overall, 1990; Toronto Maple Leafs
- Playing career: 1987–2001
Medal record
Men's ice hockey
Representing Soviet Union
World Junior Championships
Gold medal – first place	1989 United States
Silver medal – second place	1990 Finland
European Junior Championships
Bronze medal – third place	1987 Finland
Bronze medal – third place	1988 Czechoslovakia

Oleksandr Olehovych Hodyniuk (Ukrainian: Олександр Олегович Годинюк; born January 27, 1970), known commonly as Alexander Godynyuk is a Ukrainian former professional ice hockey defenceman. He was drafted in the sixth round, 115th overall, by the Toronto Maple Leafs in the 1990 NHL entry draft.

== Career ==
Godynyuk played parts of five seasons in the Soviet Union before coming to North America to join the Maple Leaf organization. He made his NHL debut for Toronto in the 1990–91 season, appearing in 18 games. He played in 31 more games for the Maple Leafs in the 1991–92 season before being traded to the Calgary Flames in a ten-player deal which brought Doug Gilmour to Toronto.

Godynyuk was selected from the Flames by the Florida Panthers in the 1993 NHL Expansion Draft. He would move on to the Hartford Whalers midway through the 1993–94 season, and would stay there for the remainder of his NHL career.

The Phoenix Coyotes played their first game in franchise history against the Whalers on October 5, 1996. In that game, Godynyuk scored the first goal ever against the Coyotes.

Godynyuk left the NHL after the 1996–97 season. He played in the International Hockey League with the Chicago Wolves for one season, and then went to Europe to play in Switzerland's Nationalliga A and Germany's Deutsche Eishockey Liga before retiring following the 2000–01 season.

Godynyuk represented Ukraine at the 1999 IIHF World Championship.

In his NHL career, Godynyuk played in 223 games. He recorded ten goals and 39 assists.

He has two daughters, named Elizabeth and Paulina.

== Awards and honors ==
- Directorate Award (Best Defenseman) and All-Star Selection, 1990 IIHF World Junior Hockey Championships.

== Career statistics ==
=== Regular season and playoffs ===
			Regular season					Playoffs
Season	Team	League	GP	G	A	Pts	PIM	GP	G	A	Pts	PIM
1986–87	Sokil Kyiv	USSR	9	0	1	1	2	—	—	—	—	—
1986–87	ShVSM Kyiv	USSR II	11	0	2	2	6	—	—	—	—	—
1987–88	Sokil Kyiv	USSR	2	0	0	0	2	—	—	—	—	—
1987–88	ShVSM Kyiv	USSR II	22	4	2	6	20	—	—	—	—	—
1988–89	Sokil Kyiv	USSR	30	3	3	6	12	—	—	—	—	—
1988–89	ShVSM Kyiv	USSR II	9	3	0	3	18	—	—	—	—	—
1989–90	Sokil Kyiv	USSR	37	3	2	5	31	—	—	—	—	—
1990–91	Sokil Kyiv	USSR	19	3	1	4	20	—	—	—	—	—
1990–91	Toronto Maple Leafs	NHL	18	0	3	3	16	—	—	—	—	—
1990–91	Newmarket Saints	AHL	11	0	1	1	29	—	—	—	—	—
1991–92	Toronto Maple Leafs	NHL	31	3	6	9	59	—	—	—	—	—
1991–92	Calgary Flames	NHL	6	0	1	1	4	—	—	—	—	—
1991–92	Salt Lake Golden Eagles	IHL	17	2	1	3	24	—	—	—	—	—
1992–93	Calgary Flames	NHL	27	3	4	7	19	—	—	—	—	—
1993–94	Florida Panthers	NHL	26	0	10	10	35	—	—	—	—	—
1993–94	Hartford Whalers	NHL	43	3	9	12	40	—	—	—	—	—
1994–95	Hartford Whalers	NHL	14	0	0	0	8	—	—	—	—	—
1995–96	Hartford Whalers	NHL	3	0	0	0	2	—	—	—	—	—
1995–96	Springfield Falcons	AHL	14	1	3	4	19	—	—	—	—	—
1995–96	Detroit Vipers	IHL	7	0	3	3	12	—	—	—	—	—
1995–96	Minnesota Moose	IHL	45	9	17	26	81	—	—	—	—	—
1996–97	Hartford Whalers	NHL	55	1	6	7	41	—	—	—	—	—
1997–98	Chicago Wolves	IHL	50	5	11	16	85	1	0	0	0	0
1998–99	SC Bern	NDA	43	9	16	25	20	5	1	0	1	2
1999–2000	Eisbären Berlin	DEL	48	6	19	25	42	—	—	—	—	—
2000–01	Eisbären Berlin	DEL	36	5	6	11	12	—	—	—	—	—
USSR totals			97	9	7	16	67	—	—	—	—	—
NHL totals			223	10	39	49	224	—	—	—	—	—
IHL totals			119	16	32	48	202	1	0	0	0	0

=== International ===
Year	Team	Event	GP	G	A	Pts	PIM
1987	Soviet Union	EJC	7	0	3	3	6
1988	Soviet Union	EJC	6	0	0	0	4
1989	Soviet Union	WJC	7	0	1	1	2
1990	Soviet Union	WJC	7	3	2	5	4
1998	Ukraine	WC Q	3	1	0	1	0
1999	Ukraine	WC	3	0	0	0	0
Junior totals			27	3	6	9	16
