= Tampere Cup =

Ice hockey tournament in Tampere, Finland

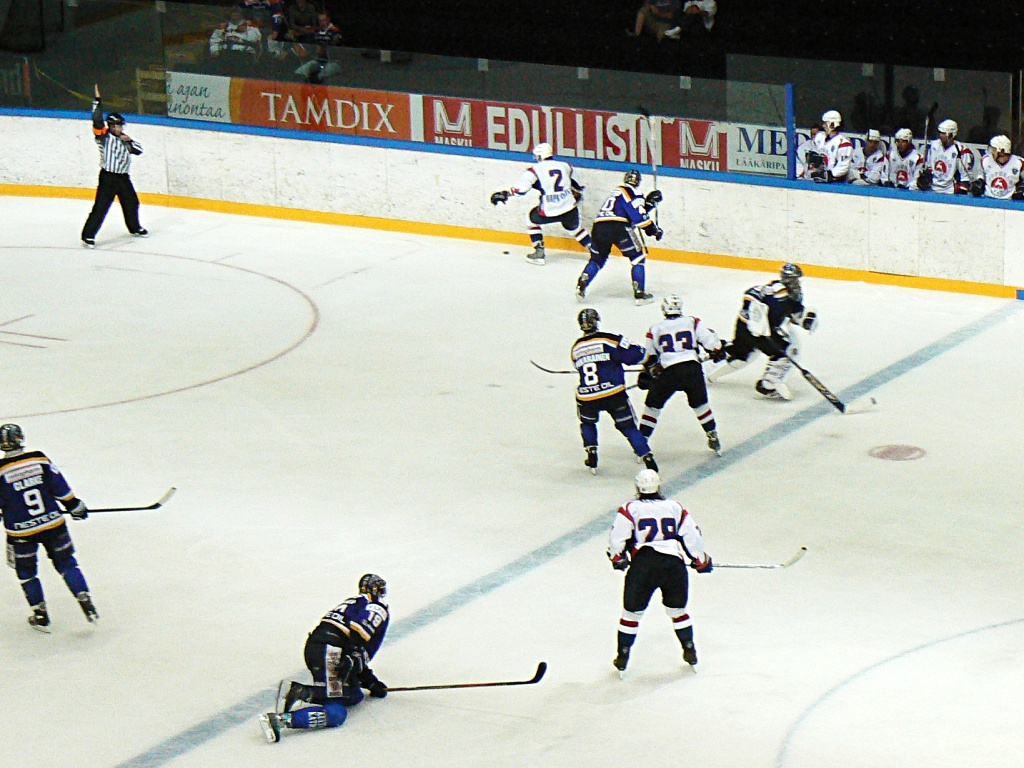
The Espoo Blues and Torpedo Nizhny Novgorod compete at the 2007 Tampere Cup.

Tampere Cup is an annual ice hockey tournament held in Tampere, Finland. It is hosted by two local teams, Tappara and Ilves.

The most successful team is one of the hosts, Tappara with four titles. Metallurg Magnitogorsk has won the tournament three times and Djurgården, Dynamo Moscow, Espoo Blues and HIFK two times each.

The tournament was not played from 2009 to 2014, but it returned in 2015. The modern editions have featured four teams per year, all Finnish. Teams play semifinal matches on Friday and the winners play for the championship on Saturday while the losers play for the bronze medals. Earlier editions had more teams most of which were foreign.

== Winners ==
Year	Champion	Runner-up	Third place
1989	Sokil Kyiv	Tappara	Ilves
1990	Djurgårdens IF	Luleå HF	Krylya Sovetov Moscow
1991	HC Dynamo Moscow	United States national team	Canada national team
1992	HC Dynamo Moscow	Luleå HF	Frölunda HC
1993	United States national team	Luleå HF	Ilves
1994	HIFK	Tappara	Frölunda HC
1995	Luleå HF	United States national team	HC CSKA Moscow
1996	Tappara	Kölner Haie	HC Petra Vsetín
1997	HC TPS	Kölner Haie	Tappara
1998	HV71	HC Davos	Jokerit
1999	Tappara	Ilves	HIFK
2000	Djurgårdens IF	HC Košice	EHC Kloten
2001	Espoo Blues	HC Košice	Tappara
2002	Neftekhimik Nizhnekamsk	Tappara	HV71
2003	Oulun Kärpät	Ilves	HV71
2004	ZSC Lions	Oulun Kärpät	Linköpings HC
2005	Metallurg Magnitogorsk	Espoo Blues	ZSC Lions
2006	Metallurg Magnitogorsk	Tappara	Brynäs
2007	Espoo Blues	Metallurg Magnitogorsk	Tappara
2008	Metallurg Magnitogorsk	Ilves	Espoo Blues
Tournament not held from 2009 to 2014
2015	HIFK	Ilves	Tappara
2016	Tappara	HC TPS	Ilves
2017	Tappara	HIFK	Ilves
2018	Tappara	HIFK	Ilves
2019	Ilves	HIFK	Tappara
2020	Lukko	Tappara	Ilves
2021	KooKoo	Tappara	HPK
2022	Tappara	HPK	Ilves
2023	Timrå IK	Ilves	Tappara
2024	HC Davos	Ilves	Tappara
2023	HC Ässät Pori	Tappara	HIFK
