= 1996–97 Ukrainian Hockey Championship =

- League: Ukrainian Hockey Championship
- Sport: Ice hockey
- Number of teams: 7

Regular season
- Regular season winners: HC Sokil Kyiv

Playoffs
- Finals champions: HC Sokil Kyiv
- Runners-up: HK Kryzhynka Kyiv

Ukrainian Hockey Championship seasons
- ← 1994–95 1997–98 →

The 1996–97 Ukrainian Hockey Championship was the fourth season and fifth iteration of the Ukrainian Hockey Championship, the top level of ice hockey in Ukraine. Seven teams participated in the league, and HC Sokil Kyiv won the championship.

== Regular season ==
	Club	GP	W	T	L	GF:GA	Pts
1.	HC Sokil Kyiv	12	10	1	1	85:15	21
2.	Sdyushor Kharkiv	12	8	2	2	59:29	18
3.	HK Kryzhynka Kyiv	12	8	1	3	56:41	17
4.	HK ATEK Kyiv	12	4	3	5	36:43	11
5.	Politechnik Yasya Kyiv	12	4	3	5	56:57	11
6.	Sdyushor Sokil Kyiv	12	2	2	8	25:49	6
7.	Ivars Kyiv	12	0	0	12	24:115	0

== Playoffs ==
Semifinals

- HC Sokil Kyiv 5 - HK ATEK Kyiv 2
- Kryzhynka Kyiv 11 - Sdyushor Kharkiv 2

Final

- HC Sokil Kyiv 5 - Kryzhynka Kyiv 1

3rd place

- HK ATEK Kyiv 6 - Sdyushor Kharkiv 4
