= Solyony, Republic of Bashkortostan =

Solyony Солёный
- Khutor
- Location within Bashkortostan Location within Russia
- Coordinates: 53°33′N 56°16′E
- Country: Russia
- Region: Bashkortostan
- District: Ishimbaysky District
- Time zone: UTC+5:00

Solyony (Russian: Солёный) is a rural locality (a khutor) in Petrovsky Selsoviet, Ishimbaysky District, Bashkortostan, Russia. The population was 1 as of 2010. There are 3 streets.

== Geography ==
Solyony is located 24 km northeast of Ishimbay (the district's administrative centre) by road. Timashevka is the nearest rural locality.
