= Tuluganovka, Volodarsky District, Astrakhan Oblast =

Tuluganovka Тулугановка
- Selo
- Location within Astrakhan Oblast Location within Russia
- Coordinates: 46°20′N 48°27′E
- Country: Russia
- Region: Astrakhan Oblast
- District: Volodarsky District
- Time zone: UTC+4:00

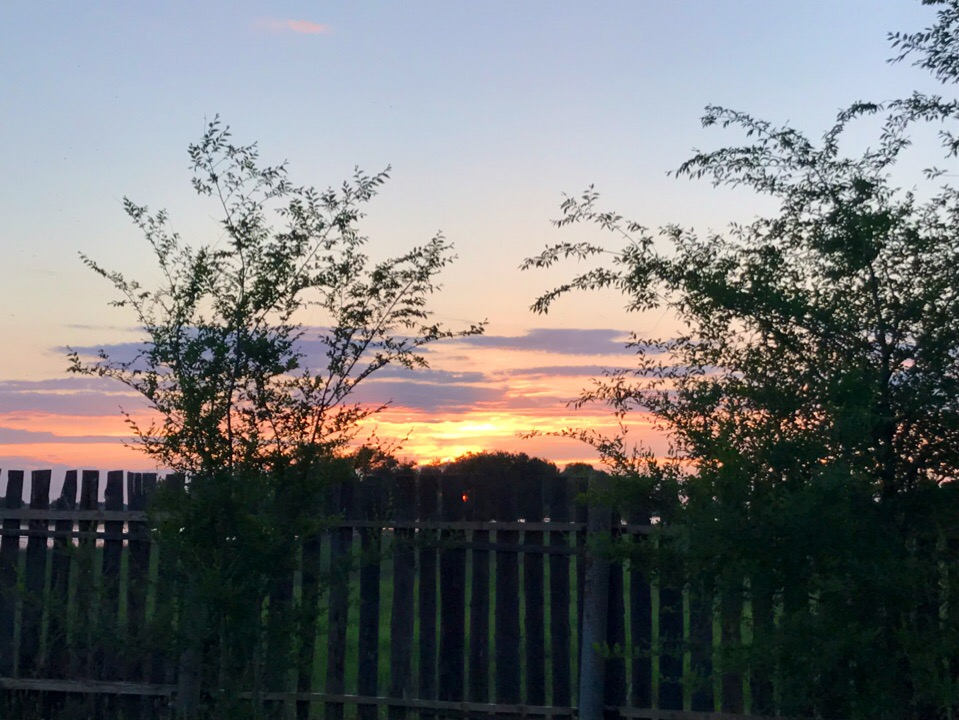
Sunset in Tuluganovka, Volodarsky District, Astrakhan Oblast

Tuluganovka (Russian: Тулугановка) is a rural locality (a selo) and the administrative center of Tuluganovsky Selsoviet of Volodarsky District, Astrakhan Oblast, Russia. The population was 846 as of 2010.

== Geography ==
Tuluganovka is located 11 km (6.8 mi) southwest of Volodarsky (the district's administrative centre) by road. Stary Altynzhar is the nearest rural locality.
