= Nikolai Narimanov =

- Born: April 10, 1958 (age 67) Sverdlovsk, Soviet Union
- Height: 5 ft 9 in (175 cm)
- Weight: 183 lb (83 kg; 13 st 1 lb)
- Position: Forward
- Shot: Left
- Played for: HC CSKA Moscow; Sokil Kyiv; EHC Hamburg; EV Füssen; HC Bolzano; Heilbronner EC; EC Stuttgart
- National team: Soviet Union
- NHL draft: Undrafted
- Playing career: 1977–2000

Nikolai Narimanov (born April 10, 1958 in Sverdlovsk) is a Soviet former ice hockey player.

== Career ==
He began his career with HC CSKA Moscow in the Soviet Championship League during the 1976–77 season. In total, Narimanov played 369 games in the Soviet League, the majority of them with Sokil Kyiv. He joined EHC Hamburg of the 2nd Bundesliga in 1989 and spent the remainder of his career playing in the lower-level German leagues, with the exception of 1992–93, when he played for the Italian club HC Bolzano.

Internationally, Narimanov played for the Soviet Union national junior ice hockey team at the 1978 World Junior Ice Hockey Championships.

== Career statistics ==
			Regular season					Playoffs
Season	Team	League	GP	G	A	Pts	PIM	GP	G	A	Pts	PIM
1975–76	Avtomobilist Sverdlovsk-2	Soviet2	43	7	4	11	22	—	—	—	—	—
1976–77	HC CSKA Moscow	Soviet	2	0	0	0	0	—	—	—	—	—
1976–77	HC CSKA Moscow	Soviet	5	0	0	0	0	—	—	—	—	—
1977–78	SKA MVO Lipetsk	Soviet2	5	4	0	4	0	—	—	—	—	—
1977–78	SKA Leningrad	Soviet	8	2	1	3	2	—	—	—	—	—
1978–79	Avtomobilist Sverdlovsk	Soviet	44	19	16	35	29	—	—	—	—	—
1979–80	Avtomobilist Sverdlovsk	Soviet	41	22	13	35	26	—	—	—	—	—
1980–81	Sokil Kiev	Soviet	48	5	21	26	22	—	—	—	—	—
1981–82	Sokil Kiev	Soviet	52	15	11	26	22	—	—	—	—	—
1982–83	Sokil Kiev	Soviet	43	17	15	32	26	—	—	—	—	—
1983–84	Sokil Kiev	Soviet	43	11	6	17	38	—	—	—	—	—
1984–85	Sokil Kiev	Soviet	40	26	5	31	18	—	—	—	—	—
1985–86	Sokil Kiev	Soviet	35	15	8	23	12	—	—	—	—	—
1986–87	Sokil Kiev	Soviet	17	4	1	5	6	—	—	—	—	—
1986–87	ShVSM Kyiv	Soviet2	32	12	3	15	34	—	—	—	—	—
1987–88	Sokil Kiev	Soviet	44	8	3	11	20	—	—	—	—	—
1988–89	Sokil Kiev	Soviet	41	10	3	13	12	—	—	—	—	—
1989–90	1. EHC Hamburg	Germany2	33	37	39	76	16	—	—	—	—	—
1990–91	EV Füssen	Germany2	35	40	36	76	36	—	—	—	—	—
1991–92	EV Füssen	Germany3	33	44	54	98	40	—	—	—	—	—
1992–93	EV Bozen 84	Italy3	—	—	—	—	—	—	—	—	—	—
1992–93	Sokil Kiev-2	Russia2	2	1	2	3	2	—	—	—	—	—
1993–94	Heilbronner EC	Germany3	39	54	40	94	22	11	12	11	23	16
1994–95	EC Stuttgart	Germany3	30	53	22	75	74	—	—	—	—	—
1995–96	Heilbronner EC	Germany2	14	9	10	19	10	1	0	0	0	0
1996–97	Heilbronner EC	Germany2	17	5	12	17	14	2	2	2	4	10
1997–98	Heilbronner EC	Germany2	10	1	0	1	10	—	—	—	—	—
1998–99	Heilbronner EC	Germany2	9	0	0	0	2	—	—	—	—	—
1999–00	Heilbronner EC II	Germany4	—	—	—	—	—	—	—	—	—	—
Soviet totals			463	154	103	257	231	11	6	4	10	6
