= Sokil Kyiv =

Ukrainian professional hockey team

- City: Kyiv, Ukraine
- League: UHL
- Founded: 1963
- Home arena: Kyiv Palace of Sports
- Colours: Blue, white
- Head coach: Oleh Shafarenko
- Captain: Dmytro Nimenko
- Website: hcsokil.com.ua

Franchise history
- 1963–1973: HC Dynamo Kyiv
- 1973–1992: HC Sokil Kyiv
- 1992–1993: HC Sokil-Eskulap Kyiv
- 1993–present: HC Sokil Kyiv

Hockey Club Sokil Kyiv (Ukrainian: ХК Сокіл Київ, lit. 'Falcon Hockey Club'), commonly known as Sokil Kyiv, HC Sokil, or HC Sokol Kiev, is a Ukrainian professional ice hockey team based in Kyiv. While their home arena is located in the city, the team also plays out of Brovary, still within the Kyiv region.

They are a founding club of the Professional Hockey League of Ukraine, and have formerly competed in the national leagues of Belarus, Russia, and the Soviet Union. Until 2014 Sokil remained the oldest and most accomplished team in Ukrainian hockey, winning 12 of the 19 Ukrainian Hockey Championships held since 1992. The club's senior team was inactive from 2014 to 2020.

The club was founded in 1963 as part of the Dynamo sports society, and adopted its current moniker in 1973. They are the second major-professional ice hockey team to represent the city of Kyiv, preceded only by its short lived predecessor, also named Dynamo (founded in 1953). They are the most successful Ukrainian team to have competed in the Soviet Championship, finishing as high as third in the highly competitive circuit (1985) and producing several award-winning players. In 1986, Sokil managed to become the first and only Ukrainian-based team to compete in the Spengler Cup ice hockey tournament, where they would finish 2nd. They also became the first Ukrainian team to win an international league championship, doing so in the Eastern European Hockey League consecutively in 1998 and 1999.

Sokil is accredited with developing a majority of the country's top young hockey players, producing NHL All Stars such as Dmytro Khrystych and Oleksiy Zhytnyk, and Stanley Cup Champions Ruslan Fedotenko and Anton Babchuk.

== Franchise history ==
=== 1963–1973: Dynamo ===
The team was founded in the summer of 1963 by the Deputy Chairman of Sports of Ukraine, Adrian Miziak, under the name of Dynamo Kyiv. 1963 may be the official birth year of the team, but it was a decade earlier that a Dynamo team from Kyiv would play in the Soviet Cup, making it as far as the second round of the playoffs. The current incarnation, however, would begin its hockey operations in the second tier of Soviet ice hockey, holding its first game on 27 October 1963 against SKA Kuybyshev. The team's first head coach was Dmitri Boginov. Forward Viktor Martinov would score the first goal in club history two minutes into the match, and the team would go on to win the game at a score of 4:1. Martinov would go on to lead the team in goals that season with 16. Though the team would finish 6th in its inaugural season, they would go on to have the best record in their division the following year; earning a promotion to the top level of competition in the Soviet leagues. To open the 1965–66 season, Kyiv would boast the second largest arena in the Soviet Union. However, while competing at the top level, Dynamo struggled. During its five years of competition in the league, which included playoff qualification each year, the team would exhibit sub-par play. Sokil's Soviet Cup playoff run in 1968 would prove to be a highlight in otherwise disappointing campaigns. Their elimination by SKA Leningrad in the quarterfinals would be the furthest the team would finish in the tournament for nearly a decade. In the following season, Sokil would finish the first round of competition in 10th place of 12 teams, resulting in a temporary demotion to the second-tier of competition. This would last the remainder of the season. They would finish 6th in this group of 18, and 12th of 24 in the record books. This poor showing would not prove a motivator for the following year, though the departure of coach Boginov would not help either. He would be replaced by Igor Shichkov, the team would finish dead last in the 1969–70 season, and once again become subject to outright relegation. The final three years under the Dynamo name would show gradual, albeit slow improvements; each season finishing one place higher in the standings.

=== 1973–1996: The Falcons ===
For the club's 10th anniversary in 1973, the club would drop the Dynamo moniker, a move which would have a lasting legacy. The historical white and blue colors of the Dynamo sports society would be kept intact, but the team would adopt the name of the "Falcon", or "Sokil" in Ukrainian. Though Sokil's play would remain inconsistent throughout the 70s, the hiring of Anatoli Bogdanov as head coach in 1976 would have an immediate impact on the team's fortunes. By the 1978 season, the team would finish 2nd overall and re-ascend to the top of the Soviet league. In their first season back, great goaltending by Konstantin Gavrilov managed to overcome a poor offense, and ultimately allowed the team squeak into the playoffs, bypassing Avtomobilist Sverdlovsk by a mere point. This foray into Soviet Cup playoffs would prove to be one of the best runs in the team's history, making it as far as the semifinals where they would ultimately fall to the legendary CSKA Moscow team. Unfortunately for the team, the Cup playoffs would not be held again for another 8 years. During this period of emphasis on regular season performance, several stars would begin to emerge from the team's ranks. Between 1981 and 1990, six players would be named to the league's 34 man All Star selections, 5 of whom were multiple time recipients.

1984–85

Sokil would remain competitive, but the addition of homegrown forward Dmytro Khrystych and defenseman Oleksandr Hodyniuk in 1985 and 1986, respectively, would elevate the team to new heights. Their 3rd-place finish in 1985 would remain a franchise best, Ramil Yuldashev would claim the league award for most hat-tricks this year with 2, and Nikolai Narimanov would lead the league in goals with 26. The following year in 1986, Sergei Davydov would follow up on Yuldashev's success and win the hat-trick award. Sokil would be invited to the Spengler Cup tournament where they would continue their success as finalists, succumbing only to Team Canada.

Winning the Tampere Cup in 1989 marked a turning point for the franchise, which would be a victim to the Soviet Union's collapse. The coming down of the Iron Curtain would allow the Los Angeles Kings of the National Hockey League to draft rising local talent and Kyiv teammate Oleksiy Zhytnyk 81st overall in the 1991 NHL draft. Zhitnik would remain the highest drafted professional Sokil player to this day. Not all talent was affected, however, as Yuldashev would lead the league in goals in 1990 along with points in 1991, and Valeri Shyriaiev would be named the league's top defensemen in both years as well. Following a 15th-place finish in 1992, the lowest in team history, the team and coach Bogdanov would part ways. This would also mark a change in the team's official name to accommodate a new sponsor; the club competed under the name Sokil Eskulap (Ukrainian: Сокіл-Ескулап) for only the 1992–93 International Hockey League (IHL) season. Bogdanov's dismissal did little to curtail the franchise's downward spiral, with the team reaching new record lows with head coach Alexander Fedeev at the helm. He would hold the position until 1996, which also marked the team's parting of ways with the newly formed Russian Hockey League.

In 1996, Stanley Cup winner and Future Olympian Ruslan Fedotenko left the team. Later, Anton Babchuk and Nikolai Zherdev, who participated in the Sokil junior development program, would later be recruited by Elektrostal scouts in the Russian Major League.

=== 1996–2009: transitions ===
With the dissolution of the IHL, orphaned teams from the Soviet Bloc found a home in the newly formed Eastern European Hockey League. Benefiting from a lower level of competition than that of the Russian league, and new head coach Oleksandr Seukand, the team would find renewed success. Sokil would finish 1st overall in 4 of the league's 8 seasons, and become league champions in both 1998 and 1999. Sokil players like Valentyn Oletsky (1997, 2000) and Dmitri Markovskiy (1998) would secure scoring titles, Konstantin Kasyanchuk was awarded league forward MVP in 2001, and Vadim Seliverstov was named top goaltender in 2003. From 2004 through to the 2006–07 season, the team would also compete in the Open Championship of Belarus, the EEHL's spiritual successor. Here they would continue their success until hitting a metaphorical wall in 2006–07, allowing more than twice as many goals against than for, and ultimately not qualifying for the playoffs. It would be the first time they would not qualify for a league playoff in over a decade. In spite of government cuts to hockey programs in the city, the team would realign its franchise with Russia, though this time with the more modest Russian Major League. Here, they received relative success. In their first season, Sokil would finish 5th in the division, 8th overall in wins. On top of these improvements, they would carry the 4th most potent offense in the league. The newly revived team was met with continued success in the Russian league, finishing with the best regular season record that year; 4th overall in points percentage. They would qualify for a bye in the first round, handily defeat Ryazan in the secondaries, but would ultimately fall to Yugra Khanty-Mansiysk in a 3–1 lopsided series.

==== Present ====
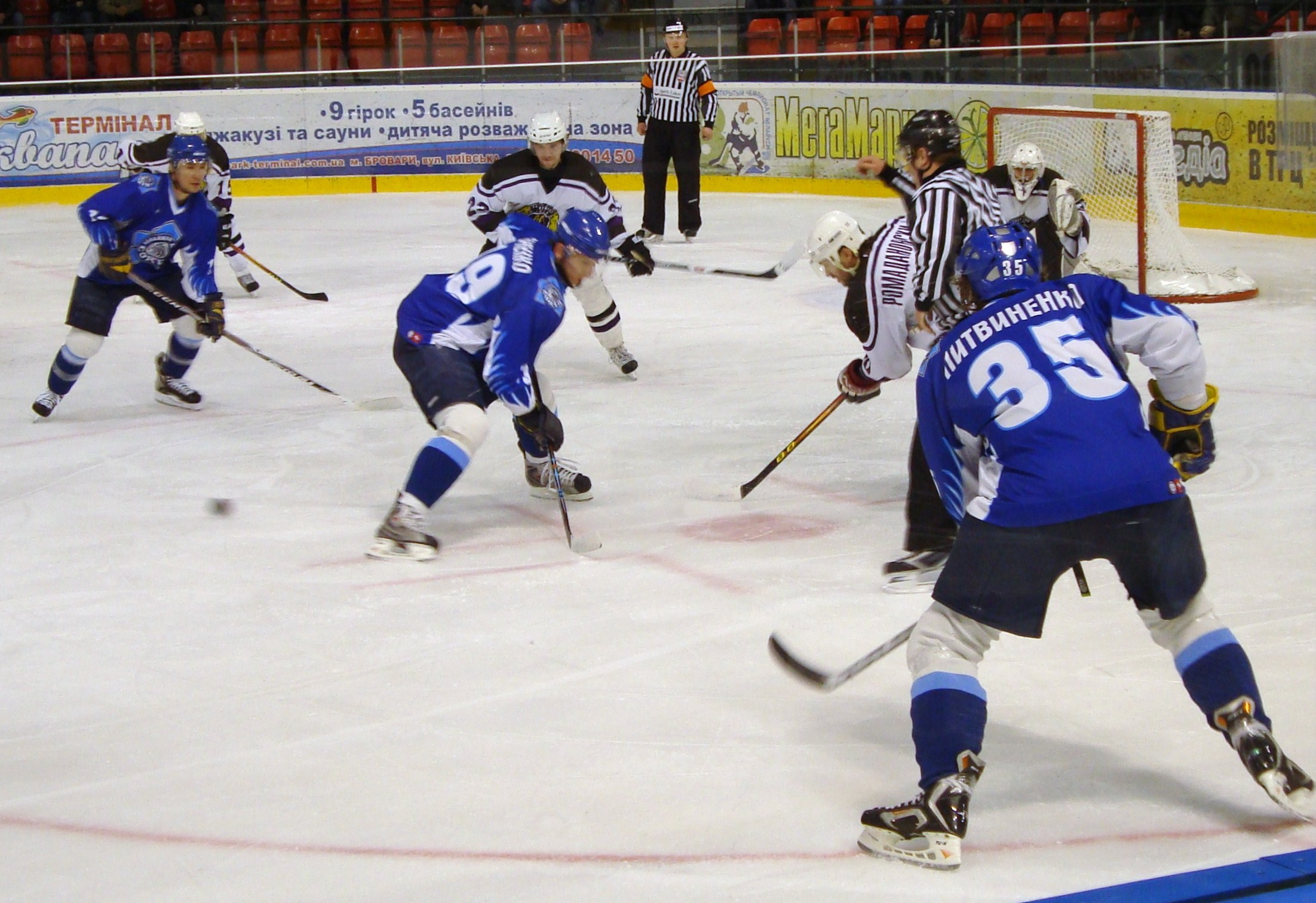
Sokil in the Belarusian Extraleague

Following the 2008–09 season in the Russian league, the club announced they would rejoining the Belarusian Extraleague for the following year. This was a move largely attributed to the financial burdens brought on by the Russian Ice Hockey Federation's (RHF) mandate that foreign teams pay for the travel, accommodations, and meals of visiting teams. The RHF also demanded that foreign teams pay an annual fee of p.1,500,000 (approx €35,000).

Going into the 2009–10 Extraleague season, Sokil elevated team expenditures and signed several Ukrainian players who had been in the Kontinental Hockey League, bolstering the roster with professional names such as Kostiantyn Simchuk, Serhiy Varlamov, and Serhiy Klymentiev. They would face further financial difficulties, losing players along the way (including Varlamov), and finish 4th in the Belarusian league's standings, ultimately falling to Yunost Minsk in the semifinals. Sokil would continue their winning streak in the Ukrainian Championship, however, winning their 12th championship. The team's financial issues continued in the 2010–12 season, however, and apart from losing many key players, the team missed the Belarusian league's playoffs and their streak in the Ukrainian Championship was broken, when they lost to HC Donbas in the finals. For the 2012 season, Sokil withdrew from the Belarusian league and joined the newly formed Professional Hockey League of Ukraine.

During its first two years in the PHL, Sokil forfeited its streak of Ukrainian Championships, with rival HC Donbas-2 becoming the new national standard. To make matters worse, the team was mired in financial difficulties, with players alleging that they were not being paid by the team.

In December 2013, players on the team went on strike due to not being paid their salaries, which stemmed from sponsorship issues. The team was forced to forfeit games.

== Team colours and mascot ==
=== Logo ===
The team's original colors as Dynamo were, hence the nickname that has held to this day ("white-blues"), white and blue. When the Sokil name was adopted, the team changed their colors to red and blue, the same colors of the Kyiv coat of arms of the time. The team would eventually return to its white and blue roots, along with the addition of a darker accent of blue, as well as black. Sokil's primary logo has, since 1973, featured a horse-chestnut leaf, the symbol of the city. This element has remained constant on both the chest piece as well as the shoulder patches throughout the team's history since adopting the "Sokil" name. The adding of a profile image of a falcon was added later on, and the team would return to its white and blue roots. To mark their 45th anniversary, Sokil updated their classic team logo for the 2008–09 season. The re-branding saw a modernization of the team's crest; with a new and more aggressive falcon centerpiece, while retaining the classic, albeit broadened, chestnut leaf backdrop.

Original logo, 1973

Sokil jersey hem logo, used briefly

Logo,until 1990

Classic logo used until 2008

2008–present

=== Jerseys ===
Current jersey

The team's original jerseys were white with horizontal blue striping. In 1973, the primary color of red was added, and the body striping was eliminated for a more contemporary look. When the sponsor's name ("Eskulap") was added briefly in 1992, the team logo was changed to a tryzub. Also, the Coca-Cola logo was added to the front of the team's jerseys for a period of time. Aside from this, when the blue and white colors came into use, the jerseys went through a series of design changes, running a gamut of styles containing variations of arm and hem striping, shoulder yolks, and design coloring. The contemporary jersey features a body and arm design that has a graphic of feathers rather than traditional hockey striping. It is the same design used by Avangard Omsk of the Kontinental Hockey League. The jerseys are made by the Russian company Lutch.

== Team awards ==
=== Leagues ===
- Eastern European Hockey League winners (2): 1998, 1999
- Ukrainian Hockey Championship winners (14): 1993, 1995, 1997, 1998, 1999, 2003, 2004, 2005, 2006, 2008, 2009, 2010, 2023, 2024
- Soviet Championship League third place (1): 1984–85

=== Other tournaments ===
- Cup of Eastern European Hockey League winners (2): 1998, 1999
- Ukrainian Hockey Cup winners (1): 2007
- Ukrainian Federation Cup winners (1): 2010
- Tampere Cup winners (1): 1989

== Players ==
=== Honored members ===
==== Honored numbers ====
Retired jerseys as they appear hanging from the rafters

Sokil Kyiv has officially honored five numbers in their history. All of the honorees were born in Ukraine.

Sokil Kyiv retired numbers
No.	Player	Years
8	Dmitri Khristich	6
11	Anatoly Stepanischev	12
13	Alexei Zhitnik	2
14	Valeri Shyriaiev	9
22	Yuri Shundrov	12

_{*Both Zhitnik and Shyriaiev are also members of the Soviet Hockey Hall of Fame}

=== Individual awards ===
Soviet Championship All Stars
- Yuri Shundrov: 1980–81, 1987–88
- Sergei Gorbushin: 1981–82, 1982–83
- Mikhail Tatarinov: 1983–84, 1985–86
- Anatoly Stepanischev: 1985–86, 1989–90
- Valeri Shyriaiev: 1987–88, 1988–89, 1989–90
- Dmitri Khristich: 1989–90

Soviet League Knight Attack award (most hat-tricks)

- Ramil Yuldashev: 1984–85, 1989–90
- Sergei Davydov: 1985–86

Soviet League Sniper award (most goals)

- Nikolai Narimanov: 1984–85
- Evgeni Shastin: 1987–88
- Ramil Yuldashev: 1990–91

Soviet League Total Points award

- Ramil Yuldashev: 1990–91

Soviet League Top Defenseman award

- Valeri Shyriaiev: 1989–90, 1990–91

=== Team leaders ===
Head coaches
- Dmitri Boginov, 1963–69
- Igor Shichkov, 1969–74
- Vladimir Egorov, 1974–76
- Anatoly Egorov, 1976–77 (until November 1977)
- Anatoli Bogdanov, 1977–91
- Alexander Fadeev, 1991–96
- Alexei Boginov 1996–97
- Oleksandr Seukand 1997–99
- Oleksandr Kulikov 1999–2001
- Oleksandr Seukand 2001–11
- Oleksandr Hodyniuk 2011–2013
- Serhiy Lubnin 2013–present
Team captains
- Valentin Utkin, 1963–
- Yuri Pavlov,
- Vladimir Andreyev, 1978–80
- Anatoly Demin, 1980–82
- Oleg Islamov, 1984–85
- Vasyl Bobrovnikov 2003–04
- Yuri Hunko, –2010
- Serhiy Klymentiev 2010–12

=== Drafted players ===
The following are players who have been drafted in the National Hockey League (NHL) Entry Draft and played the season prior to the draft for the Sokil ice hockey organization. There have been 11 players drafted in the NHL Entry Draft from the Sokil hockey club.

The most notable players drafted from Sokil are defenseman Alexei Zhitnik, who played more the 1000 regular season games in the NHL, and forward Dmitri Khristich, who scored over 250 goals and 500 points.

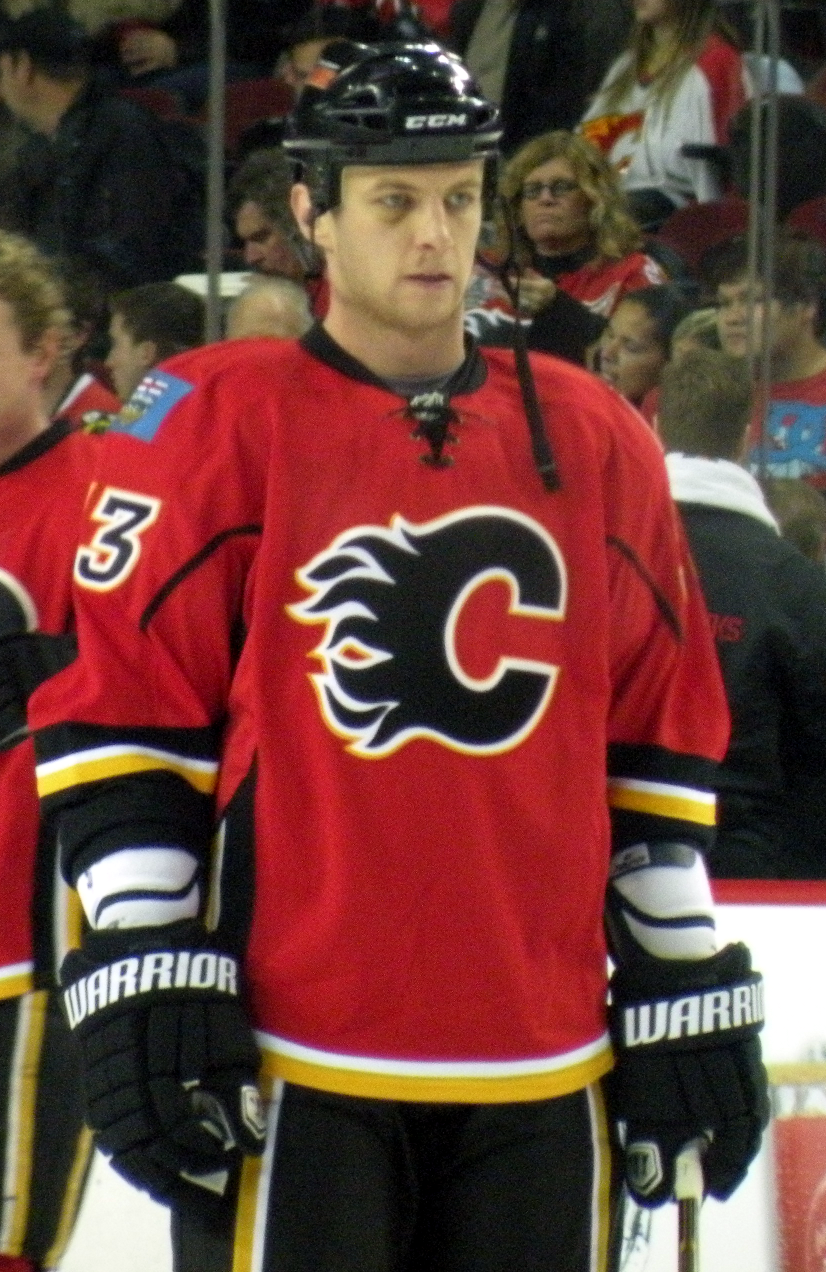
Anton Babchuk was drafted 21st overall

= Played in NHL	= NHL All-Star	= Hall of Famer

	Player	Hometown	Origin	Drafted by	Year	Round	Overall
D	Mikhail Tatarinov	Angarsk	Russian SFSR	Washington Capitals	1984	11	225
RW	Dmitri Khristich	Kyiv	Ukrainian SSR	Washington Capitals	1988	6	120
D	Alexander Godynyuk	Kyiv	Ukrainian SSR	Toronto Maple Leafs	1990	6	115
C	Alexander Kuzminsky	Kyiv	Ukrainian SSR	Toronto Maple Leafs	1991	6	120
D	Alexei Zhitnik	Kyiv	Ukrainian SSR	Los Angeles Kings	1991	4	81
RW	Ivan Vologjaninov	Kyiv	Ukraine	Los Angeles Kings	1992	11	254
D	Yurii Hunko	Kyiv	Ukraine	St. Louis Blues	1992	10	230
D	Aleksandr Alekseyev	Kyiv	Ukraine	Winnipeg Jets	1992	6	132
D	Andrei Buschan	Kyiv	Ukraine	San Jose Sharks	1993	5	106
G	Igor Karpenko	Kyiv	Ukraine	Mighty Ducks of Anaheim	1995	8	185
LW	Anatolii Koveshnikov	Kyiv	Ukraine	Dallas Stars	1995	8	193

==== Junior program NHL alumni ====
The following pupils of Sokil's hockey school have gone on to be drafted into the NHL.

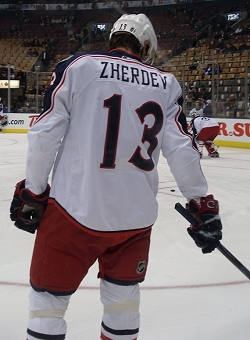
Nikolay Zherdev is the highest drafted player in the city of Kyiv's history

	Player	Hometown	Origin	Drafted by	Drafted from	Year	Round	Overall
D	Serhiy Klymentiev	Kyiv	Ukraine	Buffalo Sabres	Medicine Hat Tigers	1994	5	121
D	Maxim Linnik	Kyiv	Ukraine	St. Louis Blues	St. Thomas Stars	1998	2	41
LW	Alexei Ponikarovsky	Kyiv	Ukraine	Toronto Maple Leafs	Krylya Sovetov	1998	4	87
LW	Alexei Mikhnov	Kyiv	Ukraine	Edmonton Oilers	Lokomotiv Yaroslavl	2000	1	17
D	Anton Volchenkov	Moscow	Russia	Ottawa Senators	CSKA Moscow	2000	1	21
D	Anton Babchuk	Kyiv	Ukraine	Chicago Blackhawks	Elemash Elektrostal	2002	1	21
C	Andriy Mikhnov	Kyiv	Ukraine	St. Louis Blues	Sudbury Wolves	2002	2	62
LW	Nikolai Zherdev	Kyiv	Ukraine	Columbus Blue Jackets	CSKA Moscow	2003	1	4
C	Daniil Sobchenko	Kyiv	Ukraine	San Jose Sharks	Lokomotiv Yaroslavl	2011	6	165
