= HC Kryzhynka Kyiv =

Kryzhynka Kyiv
- City: Kyiv, Ukraine
- League: Ukrainian Hockey League
- Founded: 1991
- Colours: Blue, White

Franchise history
- 1991-1999: Kryzhynka Kyiv
- 1999-1999: Irbis Kyiv

HK Kryzhynka Kyiv (Ukrainian: ХК Крижинка Київ) was an ice hockey team in Kyiv, Ukraine. The team played in the Ukrainian Hockey League, the top level of Ukrainian ice hockey.

They were founded in 1991. Name changes

- from 1991 to 1999: Kryzhynka Kyiv
- from 1999 to 1999: Irbis Kyiv

== Achievements ==
- (silver) 1996–97 Ukrainian Hockey Championship
