= Narimanovsky District =

Narimanovsky District Наримановский район (Russian)
- District
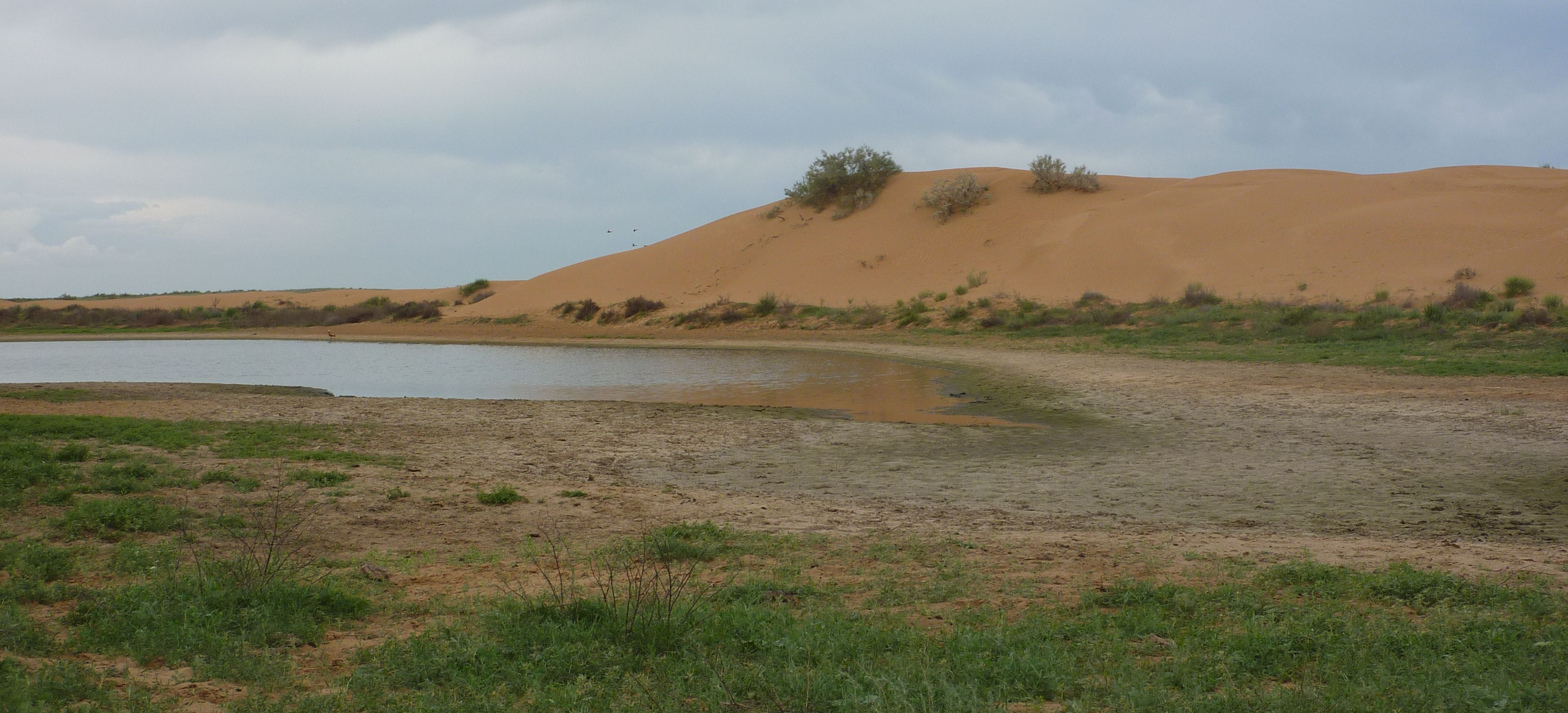
- Landscape of Narimanovsky District

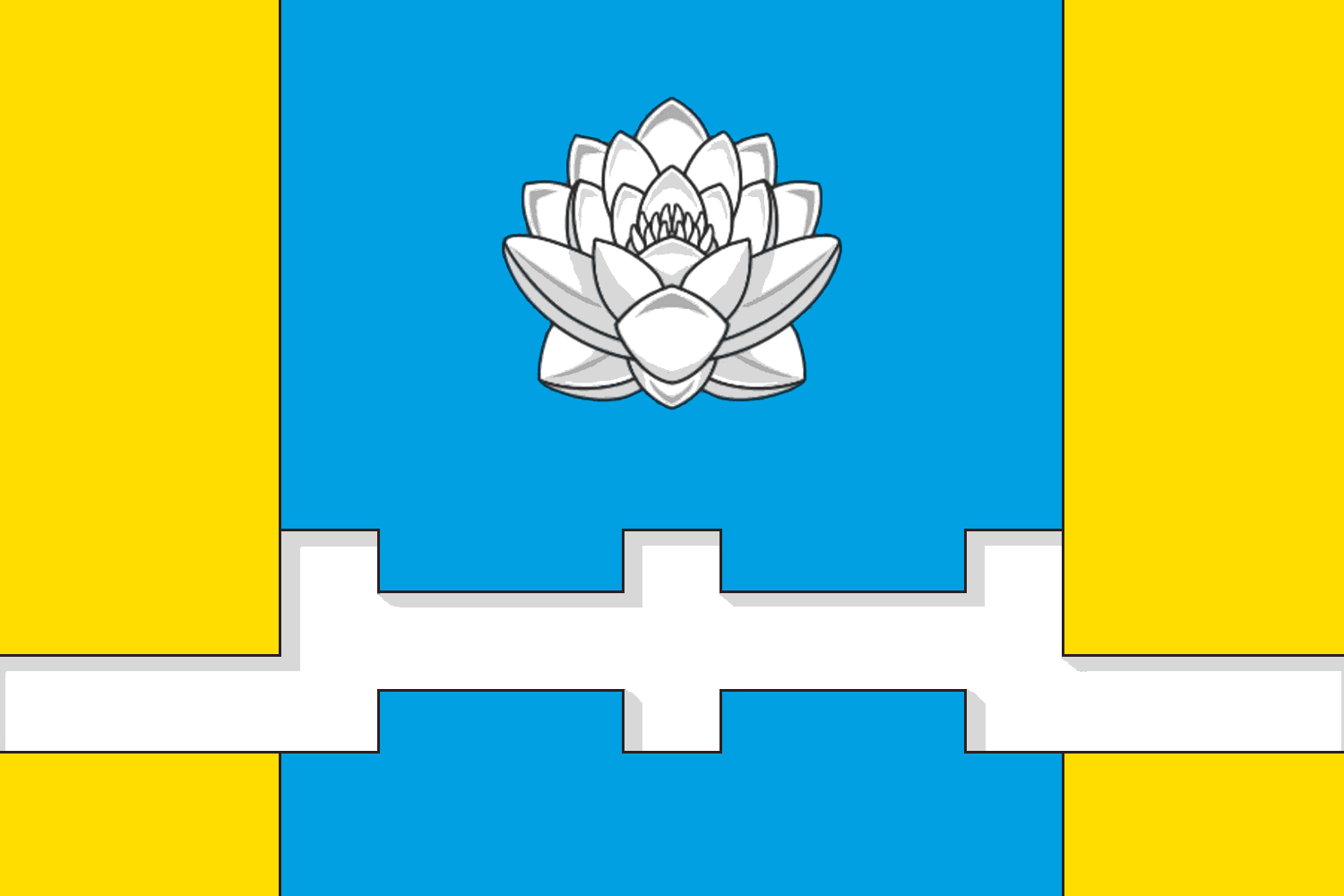
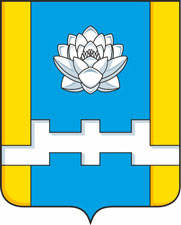
- Flag Coat of arms
- Location of Narimanovsky District in Astrakhan Oblast
- Coordinates: 46°41′N 47°51′E
- Country: Russia
- Federal subject: Astrakhan Oblast
- Established: 1931
- Administrative center: Narimanov

Area
  - Total: 6,100 km^{2} (2,400 sq mi)

Population (2010 Census)
  - Total: 45,457
  - Density: 7.5/km^{2} (19/sq mi)
  - Urban: 25.3%
  - Rural: 74.7%

Administrative structure
  - Administrative divisions: 1 Towns of district significance, 11 Selsoviets
  - Inhabited localities: 1 cities/towns, 44 rural localities

Municipal structure
  - Municipally incorporated as: Narimanovsky Municipal District
  - Municipal divisions: 1 urban settlements, 11 rural settlements
- Time zone: UTC+4 (MSK+1)
- OKTMO ID: 12640000
- Website: http://narimanov.astrobl.ru

Population of Narimanovsky District
- 2010 Census: 45,457
- 2002 Census: 44,077
- 1989 Census: 43,332
- 1979 Census: 69,282

Narimanovsky District (Russian: Нарима́новский райо́н) is an administrative and municipal district (raion), one of the eleven in Astrakhan Oblast, Russia. It is located in the southwest of the oblast. The area of the district is 6,100 square kilometers (2,400 sq mi). Its administrative center is the town of Narimanov. As of the 2010 Census, the total population of the district was 45,457, with the population of Narimanov accounting for 25.3% of that number.

== Population ==
Ethnic Russians are the biggest ethnic group in the district and make up around 41% of its population. Ethnic minorities include Kazakhs (25%), Tatars (20%) and the Roma (2%).

Ethnic composition (2010):

- Russians – 41.6%
- Kazakhs – 24.9%
- Tatars – 20.4%
- Roma – 2.1%
- Dargins – 2%
- Turks – 1.6%
- Kalmyks – 1.6%
- Chechens – 1.3%
- Others – 4.5%
