= Narimanov, Astrakhan Oblast =

Town in Astrakhan Oblast, Russia

Narimanov Нариманов
- Town
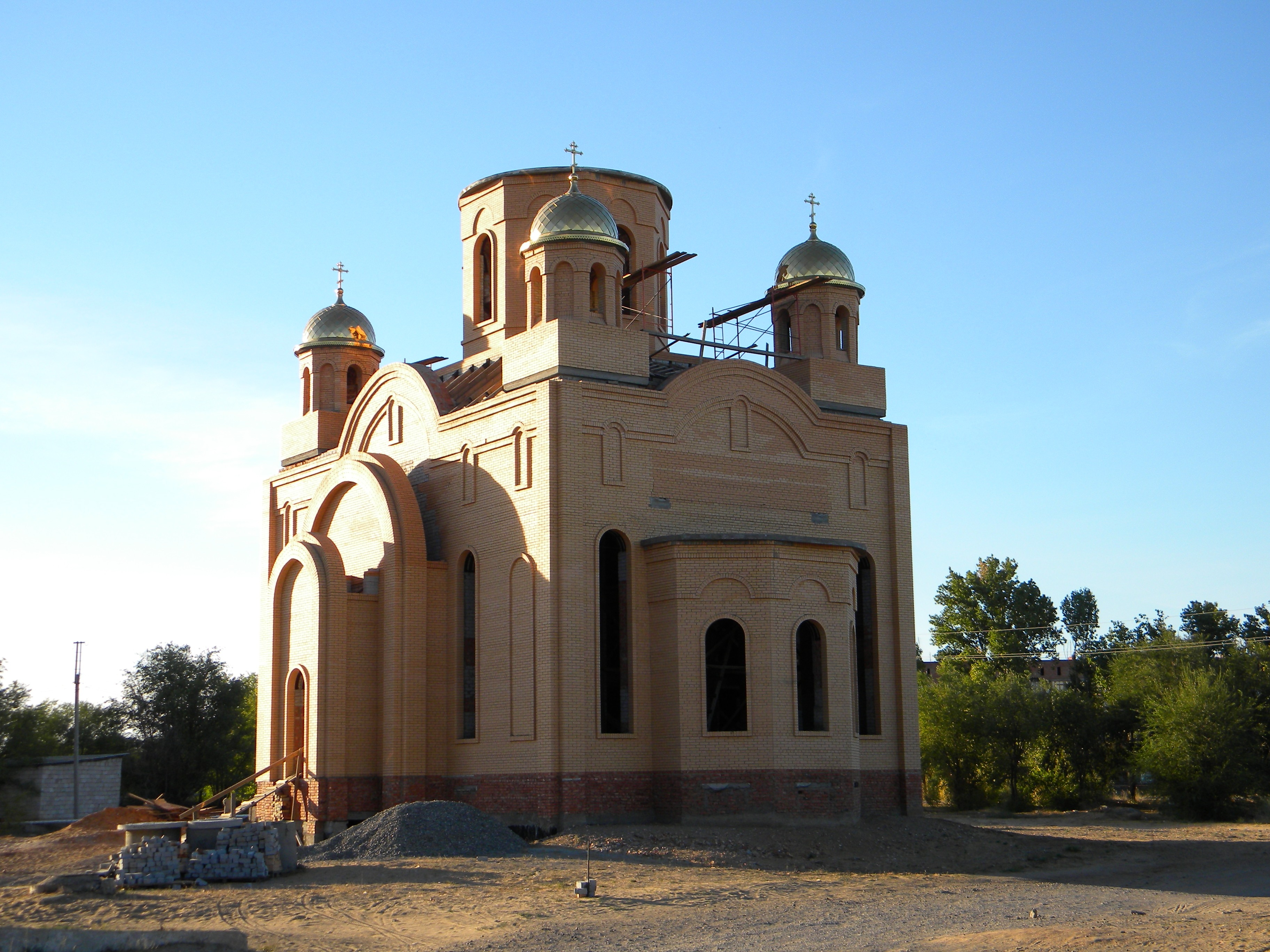
- Church in Narimanov

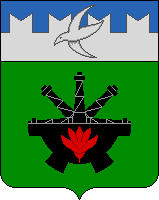
- Coat of arms
- Interactive map of Narimanov
- Location of Narimanov Narimanov (Astrakhan Oblast)
- Coordinates: 46°41′N 47°51′E
- Country: Russia
- Federal subject: Astrakhan Oblast
- Administrative district: Narimanovsky District
- Town of district significanceSelsoviet: Narimanov
- Founded: 1963
- Town status since: 1984
- Elevation: 0 m (0 ft)

Population (2010 Census)
  - Total: 11,521
  - Estimate (2021): 11,104 (−3.6%)

Administrative status
  - Capital of: Narimanovsky District, town of district significance of Narimanov

Municipal status
  - Municipal district: Narimanovsky Municipal District
  - Urban settlement: Narimanov Urban Settlement
  - Capital of: Narimanovsky Municipal District, Narimanov Urban Settlement
- Time zone: UTC+4 (MSK+1)
- Postal code: 416111
- OKTMO ID: 12640101001
- Website: mo.astrobl.ru/gorodnarimanov/

Narimanov (Russian: Нарима́нов) is a town and the administrative center of Narimanovsky District in Astrakhan Oblast, Russia, located on the western bank of the Volga River, 40.3 kilometers (25.0 mi) northwest from Astrakhan, the administrative center of the oblast. Population: 11,521 (2010 census); 11,202 (2002 census); 11,084 (1989 Soviet census); 3,400 (1979).

Sadovska (presumably part of Narimanov today) is just about four miles east of the easternmost and farthest point that German troops both occupied in the Soviet Union during World War II, and fought against Soviet troops in a battle, in September 1942. There is no monument about this historic event near Narimanov today.

== History ==
=== Easternmost location reached by German troops and site of a battle during WWII ===
The village of Sadovska, located on the banks of the Volga River in the Astrakhan Oblast, which no longer seems to exist, is presumably part of Narimanov today. Sadovska (and today Narimanov) are located about 25 miles northwest of Astrakhan.

On or around 16 September 1942, during the Case Blue, after miles of passing through a desert, a small German Wehrmacht army unit led by Lieutenant Euler, heading both for Sadovska and the shores of the Volga River, stopped about four miles west of Sadovska after discovering that both the village of Sadovska and the river shores were heavily surrounded by Soviet bunker lines, anti-tank obstacles, and ditches set up by the Soviet soldiers.

The German army unit also discovered that Soviet Red Army soldiers were stationed near the village. When the Soviet soldiers saw the German soldiers approaching, they ran to a nearby bunker and began shooting at them, obviously causing a small battle between the German and Soviet soldiers. The Germans forced the Soviet soldiers to retreat after firing at them constantly. Two Soviet soldiers who were said to be tramautized, surrendered to the Germans and let themselves be captured. The German soldiers then returned west to Khulkhuta, with the captured Soviet soldiers becoming their "valuable prisoners".

The battle near Sadovska is believed to be the easternmost location reached and occupied by German troops in the Soviet Union on the Eastern Front, as well as presumably the easternmost location where the German troops fought against the Soviet troops in a battle.

=== History of Narimanov ===
Originally known as the selo of Nizhnevolzhskoye (Нижнево́лжское), it was granted urban-type settlement status and renamed Nizhnevolzhsk (Нижнево́лжск) in 1967. In 1984, it was granted town status and renamed Narimanov, after the Azerbaijani Soviet revolutionary Nariman Narimanov.

== Administrative and municipal status ==
Within the framework of administrative divisions, Narimanov serves as the administrative center of Narimanovsky District. As an administrative division, it is incorporated within Narimanovsky District as the town of district significance of Narimanov. As a municipal division, the town of district significance of Narimanov is incorporated within Narimanovsky Municipal District as Narimanov Urban Settlement.

== Economy ==
The town is home to the Lotus shipyard. In addition to building and repairing ships, the shipyard also builds block modules for large constructions for floating oil production platforms (oil rigs).
