= CH Sevilla =

Spanish ice sports club

The Club Hielo Sevilla or CH Sevilla, is an ice sports club founded in April 1976 in Seville, Spain, and continued its activities until April 1978. The primary sports supported by CH Sevilla were ice hockey and figure skating, however, the club also maintained others such as judo, horse riding and kart racing. CH Sevilla was the first ice club in Andalusia to provide sporting licenses to figure skaters and ice hockey players.

Official picture of CH Sevilla (senior team) for the 1976/77 season

Sporting activities were developed in what was the first permanent Andalusian ice rink with regulation dimensions and known by the name "HIELOTRON". This sport arena was considered a futuristic, spectacular building and won the national prize of architecture in 1975.

The ice hockey team participated in the Spanish official competitions of the highest level in both senior Liga Nacional de Hockey Hielo and junior categories. Several figure skaters participated in the 1978 Spanish Championship in different categories.

On February 23, 1978, a storm with high winds destroyed the sports arena's cover causing significant damage to the building, nevertheless, no personal injury occurred. The club's members supplied temporary repairs which allowed ice sporting activities to continue outdoors. The temporary fixes were short-lived because it was impractical to keep the facility open after the month of April without a covering. Funds were not available to make the necessary permanent repairs, and the facility closed, halting ice club activities. Unfortunately, while the facilities were in good condition, with exception of the roof, no other private or public organization was interested in maintaining the sports facility.

== History of the first Andalusian ice hockey team ==
The first members of the senior ice hockey team came mainly from Sevillian teams of roller hockey. Some additional players also came from other Spanish ice hockey teams who came to live in Seville for work or school. The remainder of the players were young Sevillians who started ice hockey locally.

During the first months after the public opening of the ice rink, ice hockey players from USA, who were serving in the Naval Base of Rota (Cádiz), began to rent the ice rink to train and play unofficial matches. The team was led by Capt. Mike Westrick and Asst. Capt. John Roche. A few of these players ending up in the Spanish National Hockey League. After a few weeks, a team named "Rota Flying Wings" was formed to play matches against CH Seville. Every Saturday during the summer, the two teams squared off in matches that continued until the start of the National League.

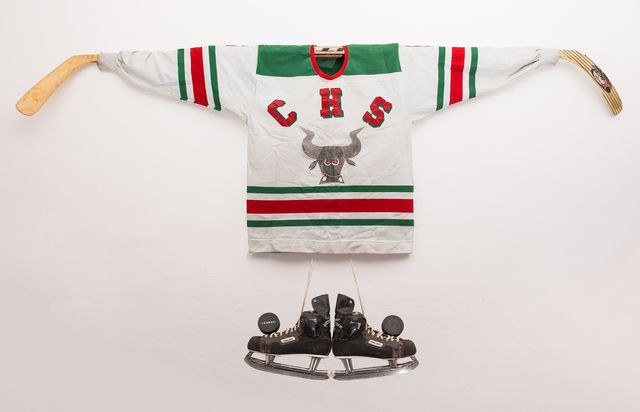
Official jersey of CH Sevilla of the 1976/77 and 1977/78 seasons

The ice rink was opened, uninterruptedly throughout the hot Sevillian summer without ice problems. In a display of patriotism, the American team "Rota Flying Wings" put a small USA flag on their jerseys, giving rise to a good-natured international rivalry. Players used the matches to train and improve skills as well as increase awareness of hockey in their area. The matches also helped prepare the CH Seville team for the imminent start of the National League.

The first official match of an Andalusian ice hockey team took place on December 5, 1976, in Barcelona, when the CH Seville played as visiting team against CH Barcelona-Catalonia.

The first official ice hockey game in Andalusia, with the participation of an Andalusian team, was on December 12, 1976, against CH Casco Viejo Bilbao. However, this match was not the first official ice hockey game held in Andalusia, since shortly after the ice rink public opening was held in Seville the final phase of the Copa Rey de Hockey sobre hielo. The first match was held in Seville on May 25, 1976, between FC Barcelona and CHH Txuri Urdin of San Sebastian. The FC Barcelona won the Championship final, held on May 27 and broadcast by TVE, after defeating the CH Casco Viejo Bilbao with the end score of 7–6.

The outstanding results achieved by the CH Seville, despite its inexperience in their first League, include the following wins:

- against CH Jaca at home (5–4)
- against CH Barcelona-Catalonia at home (7–4)
- against al CH Portugalete at home (4–3)
- against CG Puigcerdà (5–2) as visiting team.

Due to late arrival of their opponent, the CHH Txuri Urdin de San Sebastian, CH Sevilla won two additional points for forfeit at home.

During the short time the CH Sevilla played in the second season of the National League (1977–1978), it won at home to CH Las Palmas.

The CH Sevilla managed to form four youth teams to play in local competitions, demonstrating the ability of the club to foster a new generation of athletes before the ice sport facility was closed unfortunately.
