= 1972–73 Liga Nacional de Hockey Hielo season =

Liga Nacional 1972–73
- League: Liga Nacional
- Sport: Ice hockey
- Duration: January–April
- Teams: 6
- League champions: Real Sociedad
- Runners-up: Madrid

Liga Nacional seasons seasons
- 1973–74 →

The 1972–73 Superliga Espanola de Hockey Hielo season was the first season of the Superliga Espanola de Hockey Hielo, the top level of ice hockey in Spain. Six teams participated in the league, and Real Sociedad won the championship.

== Teams ==
- FC Barcelona
- CH Jaca
- CH Madrid
- CG Puigcerdà
- Real Sociedad
- CH Valladolid

== Standings ==
#	Club
1st	Real Sociedad
2nd	Madrid
3rd	FC Barcelona
4th	Valladolid
5th	Jaca
6th	Puigcerdà

1972–73 Liga Nacional de Hockey Hielo winners
(Basque Country (autonomous community))
Real Sociedad
First title
