= 1976–77 Liga Nacional de Hockey Hielo season =

Spanish ice hockey season

The 1976–77 Superliga Espanola de Hockey Hielo season was the fifth season of the Superliga Espanola de Hockey Hielo, the top level of ice hockey in Spain. Nine teams participated in the league, and CH Casco Viejo Bilbao won the championship.

== Standings ==
	Club	GP	W	T	L	Goals	Pts
1.	CH Casco Viejo Bilbao	16	15	1	0	156:40	31
2.	FC Barcelona	16	14	0	2	204:41	28
3.	CH Txuri Urdin	16	9	2	5	148:52	20
4.	CH Jaca	16	8	0	8	104:93	16
5.	CH Las Palmas	16	6	1	9	68:104	13
6.	CH Barcelona-Catalonia	16	5	1	10	87:122	11
7.	CH Portugalete	16	5	0	11	53:154	10
8.	CH Sevilla	16	5	0	11	52:130	10
9.	CG Puigcerdà	16	2	1	13	42:178	5
