= 1973–74 Liga Nacional de Hockey Hielo season =

Liga Nacional 1973–74
- League: Liga Nacional
- Sport: Ice hockey
- Teams: 5
- League champions: Real Sociedad
- Runners-up: FC Barcelona

Liga Nacional seasons
- ← 1972–73 1974–75 →

The 1973–74 Superliga Espanola de Hockey Hielo season was the second season of the Superliga Espanola de Hockey Hielo, the top level of ice hockey in Spain. Five teams participated in the league, and Real Socieded won the championship.

== Competition format ==
- 2 points for a win
- 1 point for a win
- 0 points for a loss

== Teams ==
- FC Barcelona
- CH Jaca
- CH Madrid
- CG Puigcerdà
- Real Sociedad (champion)

== Final standings ==
	Team	Pld	W	D	L	GF	GA	Dif	Pts
1	Real Sociedad	8	8	0	0	52	8	44	16
2	FC Barcelona	8	6	0	2	36	16	20	12
3	Madrid	8	3	0	5	20	28	−8	6
4	Puigcerdà	8	2	1	5	12	38	−26	5
5	Jaca	8	0	1	7	14	44	−30	1

Source: El Mundo Deportivo

Champion

1973–74 Liga Nacional de Hockey Hielo winners
(Basque Country (autonomous community))
Real Sociedad
Second title
