= Real Sociedad HH =

Spanish ice hockey team

- City: San Sebastián
- League: Superliga Espanola de Hockey Hielo
- Founded: 1972
- Folded: 1976
- Home arena: Txuri Urdin Izotz Jauregia
- Colours: Blue, white

Real Sociedad HH was an ice hockey team based in San Sebastián in the Basque Country of northeastern Spain. The team played in the Superliga Espanola de Hockey Hielo (Spanish Ice Hockey Superliga) from 1972–1976, where they won both the Spanish Championship and the Copa del Rey in 1973, 1974, and 1975.

The club’s home arena was Txuri Urdin Izotz Jauregia (Spanish: Palacio del Hielo Txuri Urdin).

== History ==
In 1972, the sports club Real Sociedad established a new section for ice hockey, called “Real Sociedad Hockey Hielo (HH).” The team was one of the six founding teams to compete in the newly created Superliga Espanola de Hockey Hielo.

Real Sociedad HH were a strong team and they saw immediate success, winning the inaugural Superliga Espanola de Hockey Hielo Championship in 1972–73 and the 1973 Copa del Rey de Hockey Hielo. They remained dominant in the following two seasons, winning both the Superliga Championship and the Copa del Rey in 1973–74 and 1974–75 seasons.

In the 1975–76 season, Real Sociedad HH was not the powerhouse it had been in the previous three seasons and finished fifth in the Superliga. CHH Txuri Urdin IHT, which had originally been created in 1972 as the reserve team for Real Sociedad HH, played in Superliga for the first time in the 1975–76 season and finished first in the league. Finnish coach Jorma Thusberg who had been the head coach of Real Sociedad became the head coach of Txuri Urdin, with whom he won the league that season.

.As a result, the Real Sociedad HH team was merged with CCH Txuri Urdin IHT and the hockey section of Real Sociedad was dissolved before the 1976–77 season.

Though both teams played in the Superliga for the 1975–76 season, the Spanish Ice Sports Federation (RFEDH) lists both teams as one franchise when discussing the total Superliga/Liga Championships and Copas del Rey won.

== Achievements ==
- Superliga Española de Hockey Hielo
  - Champions (3) : 1973, 1974, 1975
- Copa del Rey de Hockey Hielo
  - Winner (3) : 1973, 1974, 1975

== Season by season ==
Season	Tier	Division	Pos.	Notes
1972–73	1	Liga Nacional	1st	League/Cup champion
1973–74	1	Liga Nacional	1st	League/Cup champion
1974–75	1	Liga Nacional	1st	League/Cup champion
1975–76	1	Liga Nacional	5th	
