= 1974–75 Liga Nacional de Hockey Hielo season =

Spanish ice hockey season

The 1974–75 Superliga Espanola de Hockey Hielo season was the third season of the Superliga Espanola de Hockey Hielo, the top level of ice hockey in Spain. Eight teams participated in the league, and Real Sociedad won the championship.

== Teams ==
- FC Barcelona
- FC Barcelona II
- Nogaro Bilbao
- CH Jaca
- CH Madrid
- CG Puigcerdà
- Real Sociedad
- CH Txuri Urdin

== Standings ==
#	Club
1	Real Sociedad
2	FC Barcelona
3	Txuri Urdin
4	CH Jaca
5-7	?
8	Nogaro Bilbao
