= Nogaro Bilbao =

- City: Bilbao, Spain
- League: Superliga Espanola de Hockey Hielo
- Founded: 1974

Nogaro Bilbao was an ice hockey team in Bilbao, Spain. They played in the Superliga Espanola de Hockey Hielo from 1974 to 1975.

== History ==
Hockey was popular in Spain in the 1970s, and they were the first ice hockey team to come to the city of Bilbao. The team finished last (8th place) in the Superliga Espanola de Hockey Hielo in 1974–75, and ceased operations after the season.

They were replaced by the more successful CH Casco Viejo Bilbao for the 1975–76 season.
