= CH Valladolid =

- City: Valladolid, Spain
- League: Superliga Espanola de Hockey Hielo
- Founded: 1972

CH Valladolid was an ice hockey team in Valladolid, Spain. They participated in the Superliga Espanola de Hockey Hielo.

== History ==
The club was founded in 1972 as one of the six founding members of the Superliga. Due to issues with their ice rink, they played in the Superliga during the 1973 season only, before folding.
