= CH Las Palmas =

- City: Las Palmas de Gran Canaria, Spain
- League: Superliga Espanola de Hockey Hielo
- Founded: 1975
- Colours: Blue, Yellow

CH Las Palmas was an ice hockey team in Las Palmas de Gran Canaria, Spain. They participated in the Superliga Espanola de Hockey Hielo from 1976–1979.

== History ==
The club was founded in 1975, but fielded only a junior team in their inaugural season. For the 1976-77 season, the club entered the Superliga, in which they finished fifth. Las Palmas finished eighth in the Superliga in the 1977-78 season. Due to financial reasons, and poor results, the club folded in 1979.
