= CH Barcelona-Catalonia =

- City: Barcelona, Spain
- League: Superliga Espanola de Hockey Hielo
- Founded: 1975
- Colours: Red, Yellow

CH Barcelona-Catalonia was an ice hockey team in Barcelona, Catalonia, Spain. They played in the Superliga Espanola de Hockey Hielo from 1975–77.

== History ==
This team was founded in 1975 as the farm team of FC Barcelona Ice Hockey. The team lasted two years in the Superliga Espanola de Hockey Hielo, before folding in 1977.

== Results ==
- 1976 - ?
- 1977 - 6th place
